= List of alumni of the Accademia di Brera =

This is a list of the alumni of the Accademia di Brera, also known as the Accademia di Belle Arti di Brera or Brera Academy, the state art school of the city of Milan, in Lombardy, Italy.

- Felice Abrami, artist
- Tilake Abeysinghe, painter, sculptor
- Angiolo Achini, artist
- Valerio Adami, artist
- Luigi Ademollo, artist
- Carlo Paolo Agazzi, artist
- Agostino Aglio, artist
- Achille Alberti, artist
- Martina Amati, filmmaker
- Giuseppe Amisani, artist
- Aldo Andreani, architect, artist
- Attilio Andreoli, artist
- Andrea Appiani, artist
- Carlo Arienti, artist
- Giulio Cesare Arrivabene
- Enrico Baj, artist
- Carlo Balestrini
- Contardo Barbieri
- Donato Barcaglia
- Sara Battaglia, fashion designer
- Leonardo Bazzaro
- Vanessa Beecroft, artist
- Giovanni Bellati
- Giorgio Belloni
- Luca Beltrami, architect, art historian and restorer
- Daniela Benedini
- Giacomo Benevelli, sculptor
- Riccardo Beretta
- Arduino Berlam
- Ruggero Berlam
- Giuseppe Bertini
- Cesare Bertolotti
- Mosè Bianchi, artist
- Remo Bianco
- Mario Biazzi
- Emilio Bisi
- Luigi Bisi
- Leonardo Bistolfi
- Guido Boggiani, ethnographer, photographer, painter
- Aroldo Bonzagni
- Pompeo Borra, artist
- Timo Bortolotti
- Giuseppe Bossi, painter and writer
- Enrico Braga
- Fernando Brambila
- Ermocrate Bucchi
- Anselmo Bucci
- Carlo Bugatti
- Leopoldo Burlando
- Amerino Cagnoni
- Stefano Cagol, artist
- Sergio Calatroni, artist
- Ercole Calvi
- Innocente Cantinotti
- Filippo Carcano
- Aldo Carpi, artist and writer
- Carlo Carrà, artist
- Raffaele Casnedi, artist
- Achille Castiglioni
- Achille Cattaneo
- Vincent Cavallaro
- Loris Cecchini, artist
- Riccardo Cessi, painter
- James Coleman, artist
- Augusto Colombo
- Joe Cesare Colombo
- Virginio Colombo
- Mauro Conconi
- Luigi Corbellini, painter and sculptor
- Cherubino Cornienti, painter
- Michele Cusa
- Guido Daniele
- Sebastiano De Albertis
- Francesco De Lorenzi
- Francesco De Rocchi
- Cristina Donà
- Emilio Giuseppe Dossena, painter
- Leonardo Dudreville
- Giovanna Battaglia Engelbert, creative director
- Gian Maurizio Fercioni, set and costume designer
- Francesco Filippini
- Dario Fo, actor, writer
- Alessandro Focosi
- Lucio Fontana, artist
- Achille Formis
- Piero Fornasetti
- Donato Frisia
- Michelangelo Fumagalli
- Achille Funi, artist
- Giuseppe Gabellone, artist
- Silvio Gazzaniga, artist
- Tommaso Geraci
- Eugenio Gignous
- Lorenzo Gignous
- Achille Glisenti
- Zvi Goldstein
- Pietro Gualdi
- Domenico Induno
- Gerolamo Induno
- Angelo Inganni
- Samuele Jesi
- Carlo Jotti
- Vénera Kastrati, artist
- Emilio Lazzari
- Trento Longaretti
- Emilio Longoni, artist
- Serafino Macchiati
- Emilio Magistretti, artist
- Pietro Magni, artist
- Miltos Manetas, artist
- Pompeo Marchesi
- Iela Mari, artist
- Carlo Martini, artist
- Arrigo Renato Marzola
- Pietro Marzorati
- Denis Masi, artist and academic
- Giuseppe Mazza, artist
- Marco Mazzoni
- Pietro Michis
- Lorenzo Milani
- Giusseppe Modorati
- Federico Moja
- Giuseppe Molteni
- Battista Mombrini
- Giulio Mongeri
- Giuseppe Montanari
- Carlo Montuori
- Angelo Morbelli
- Giuseppe Novello
- Eleuterio Pagliano
- Mario Palanti
- Antonio Pasinetti
- Achille Peretti
- Matteo Pertsch, architect
- Domenico Pesenti
- Giovanni Pessina
- Paola Pivi, artist
- Carlo Pizzi
- Lodovico Pogliaghi
- Ambrogio Preda
- Luigi Premazzi
- Gaetano Previati
- Constantino Prinetti
- Attilio Pusterla
- Federico Quarenghi
- Camillo Rapetti
- Enrico Ravetta
- Angelo Ribossi
- Virgilio Ripari
- Remo Rossi
- Medardo Rosso, artist
- Abbondio Sangiorgio
- Rinaldo Saporiti
- Mario Sarto, artist
- Bartolomeo Schermini painter
- Luigi Secchi
- Giovanni Segantini, artist
- Jeffrey Shaw
- Roberta Silva, artist
- Antonio Soldini
- Giuseppe Solenghi
- Giuseppe Sommaruga
- Giovanni Sottocornola
- Giovanni Spertini
- Anita Spinelli
- Eugenio Spreafico
- Giovanni Strazza
- Cesare Tallone
- Parviz Tanavoli
- Arturo Tosi
- Angelo Trezzini
- Ezechiele Trombetta
- Grazia Varisco, artist
- Spartaco Vela
- Baldassare Verazzi, artist
- Adolfo Feragutti Visconti
- Ornela Vorpsi
- Bettina Werner, artist
- Giuseppe Zannoni
