= Alberto Malaspina =

Alberto Malaspina may refer to:

- Albert Malaspina (1162–1206), troubadour
- Alberto Malaspina (painter) (1853–1903), Italian painter
