= Solenghi =

Solenghi is an Italian surname. Notable people with the surname include:

- Giuseppe Solenghi (1879–1944), Italian painter
- Tullio Solenghi (born 1948), Italian actor, voice actor, director, comedian, television personality and impressionist

== See also ==
- Solenga
