= Balestrini =

Balestrini is an Italian surname. Notable people with the surname include:

- Alberto Balestrini (born 1931), Argentine fencer
- Alberto Balestrini (1947–2017), Argentine politician
- Carlo Balestrini (1868–1922), Italian painter
- Carlos Balestrini (1880–1972), Argentine sport shooter
- Giulio Balestrini (1907–?), Italian soccer player
- Nanni Balestrini (1935–2019), Italian poet
