= Oronzo Mario Scarano =

Italian composer and conductor

- Born: 1 June 1847; Mottola, Italy
- Died: 28 December 1901 (aged 54); Naples, Italy
- Occupation: composer

Oronzo Mario Scarano (1 June 1847 – 28 December 1901) was an Italian composer and conductor. He composed several operas and operettas, the majority of which premiered in Naples.

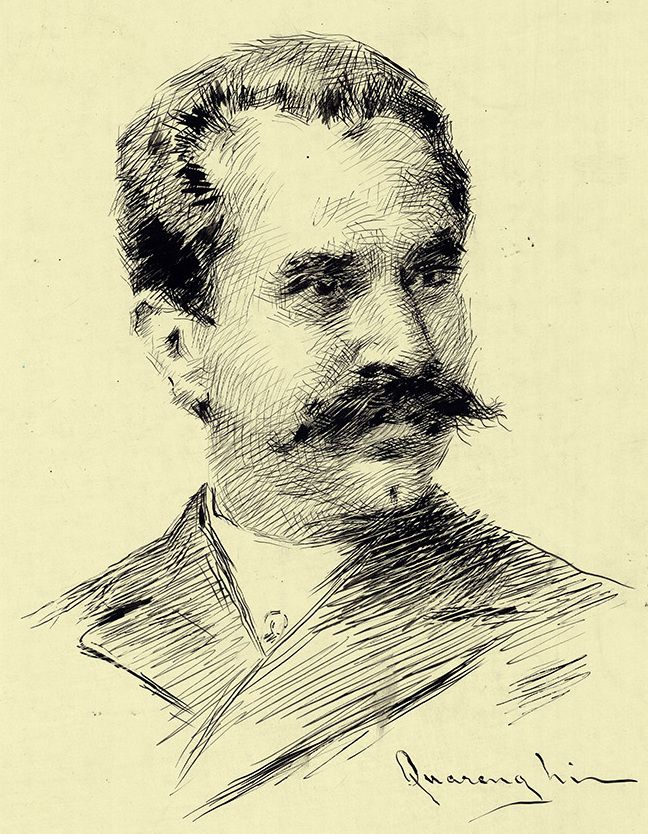
Oronzo Mario Scarano portrayed by Federico Quarenghi

Scarano was born in Mottola, a small town in southern Italy. Until he was 20 he worked with his father who was a carpenter but he also studied music with the local bandmaster. His talent for music led to his father sending him to the Naples conservatory at considerable financial sacrifice. There he studied composition under Giorgio Miceli.
