= Quarenghi =

Quarenghi is an Italian surname from Bergamo. Notable people with the surname include:

- Antonio Querenghi or Quarenghi (1546–1633), Italian lawyer, theologian and poet
- Federico Quarenghi (1858–1940), Italian painter
- Giacomo Quarenghi (1744–1817), Italian-Russian architect
- Guglielmo Quarenghi (1826–1882), Italian composer and cellist

== See also ==
- 32807 Quarenghi, a minor planet
