= Macchiati =

Macchiati is a surname. Notable people with the surname include:

- Mario Macchiati (born 1999), Italian artistic gymnast
- Serafino Macchiati (1861–1916), Italian painter

== See also ==
- Macchiato (disambiguation)
