= Trombetta =

Trombetta is a surname. Notable people with the surname include:

- Antonio Trombetta (1436–1517), Italian educator and philosopher
- Cristian Trombetta (born 1986), Argentine footballer
- Edward J. Trombetta (died 2008), American politician
- Ezechiele Trombetta (1834–1903), Italian sculptor
- Luigi Trombetta (1820–1900), Italian cardinal
- Mattia Trombetta (born 1974), Italian rower
- Maurizio Trombetta (born 1962), Italian former football player
- Michael J. Trombetta (born 1966), American racehorses trainer
- Michele Trombetta (born 1994), Italian footballer
- Otello Trombetta (born 1915), Italian professional football player
- Waldemar Trombetta (born 1954), Brazilian rower
