= Saporiti =

Saporiti is a surname. Notable people with the surname include:

- Cayetano Saporiti (1887–1954), Uruguayan footballer
- Rinaldo Saporiti (1840–1913), Italian painter
- Roberto Saporiti (born 1939), Argentine footballer
- Teresa Saporiti (1763–1869), Italian operatic soprano and composer
- Vincenzo Saporiti (1606–1664), Italian Roman Catholic prelate

== See also ==
- Palazzo Saporiti
