= Ambrogio di Predi =

Ambrogio di Predi may refer to:

- Giovanni Ambrogio de Predis, (c. 1455 – c. 1508), Italian Renaissance artist active in Milan
- Ambrogio Preda (1839 - 1906), Italian painter
