= Calatroni =

Calatroni is a surname of Italian origin. Notable people with the surname include:

- Attilio Calatroni (born 1950), Italian fencer
- Sergio Calatroni (born 1951), Italian artist and architect
