= Pessina =

Pessina is an Italian surname. Notable people with the surname include:

- Giorgio Pessina (1902–1977), Italian fencer
- Giovanni Pessina (1836–1904), Italian painter
- Jean Pessina, Swiss slalom canoeist
- Massimo Pessina (born 2007), Italian footballer
- Matteo Pessina (born 1997), Italian footballer
- Stefano Pessina (born 1941), Italian-born Monegasque billionaire
