= Roberto Cessi =

Italian historian and politician

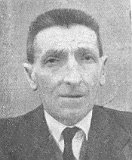
- Born: 20 August 1885; Rovigo, Kingdom of Italy
- Died: 19 January 1969 (aged 83); Padua, Republic of Italy
- Education: University of Padua
- Occupations: Historian, politician, writer
- Writing career
- Genre: History
- Subjects: Republic of Venice, Veneto, Martin Luther

Roberto Cessi (20 August 1885 – 19 January 1969) was an Italian historian and politician, specializing in Venetian history.

== Biography ==
He was born in Rovigo, to painter Riccardo Cessi and Clementina Moretti. He studied at the University of Padua, graduating in law. He specialized in historiographical research of an economic and legal nature. Politically active, he wrote in several newspapers, including Avanti! and the democratic Paduan newspaper La Libertà. In 1908 he was hired at the State Archives of Venice, where he remained until 1920. At the end of the First World War. between 1919 and 1920 he was sent to Austria, where he dealt with the restitution of a series of documents which, following the end of Austrian rule over the Veneto had remained in the Austrian archives.

In 1920 he was moved to Bari as a history teacher; from 1922 to 1927 he held the same post in Trieste and from 1927 to 1955 he was professor of medieval and modern history at the University of Padua.

After the Second World War he was elected deputy of the PSI in the first legislature: from 1 June 1948 to 1951 he presented six bills; he actively collaborated with the Encyclopedia Treccani, was a member of the Accademia dei Lincei and president of the Venetian Deputation of Homeland History (Deputazione di Storia Patria per le Venezie). He studied and published volumes dedicated above all to the history of Venice and the Veneto, from the Middle Ages to the Risorgimento. Between 1944 and 1946 he published his Storia della Repubblica di Venezia ("History of the Republic of Venice") in two volumes. He also devoted himself to other topics: at the request of Delio Cantimori, in 1954 he published a biography of Martin Luther.

His personal library was donated to the Biblioteca Universitaria di Padova by his heirs in 1991.

== Works ==
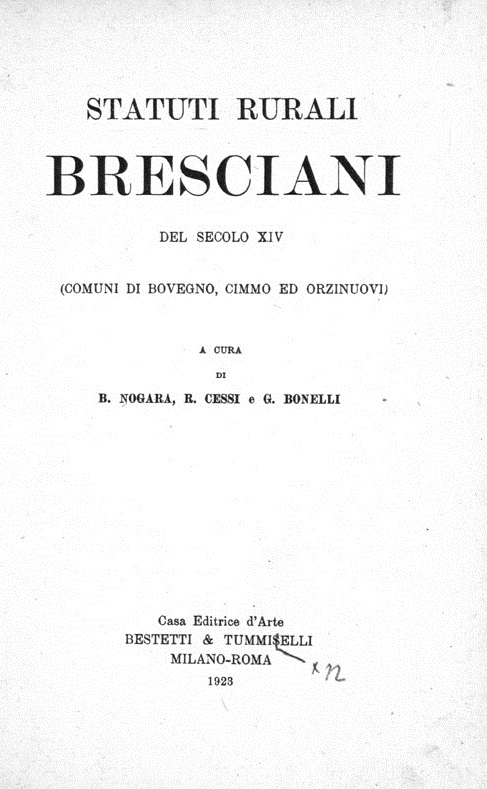
Statuti rurali bresciani del secolo XIV, 1923

- Un passo dubbio di Ennodio, Padova 1905.
- Statuti rurali bresciani del secolo XIV. Milano-Roma. 1923 – via Bestetti e Tumminelli.
- Theodoricus inlitteratus, in: Miscellanea di studi critici in onore di V. Crescini, Cividale 1927, p.. 211–236.
- Dispacci degli ambasciatori veneziani alla corte di Roma presso Giulio II (25 giugno 1509 - 9 gennaio 1510), Venezia 1932.
- Documenti relativi alla storia di Venezia anteriori al Mille, 2vol., Padova 1940 e 1942 (ND Venezia 1991).
- La Repubblica di Venezia e il problema adriatico, Edizioni Scientifiche Italiane, Napoli 1953.
- Martino Lutero, Einaudi, Torino 1954.
- Storia della Repubblica di Venezia [nuova edizione riveduta ed ampliata], Casa Editrice Giuseppe Principato, Milano / Messina 1968 (Biblioteca Storica Principato; 26).
