= Mottola =

Mottola Mòtele (Neapolitan)
- Comune
- Comune di Mottola
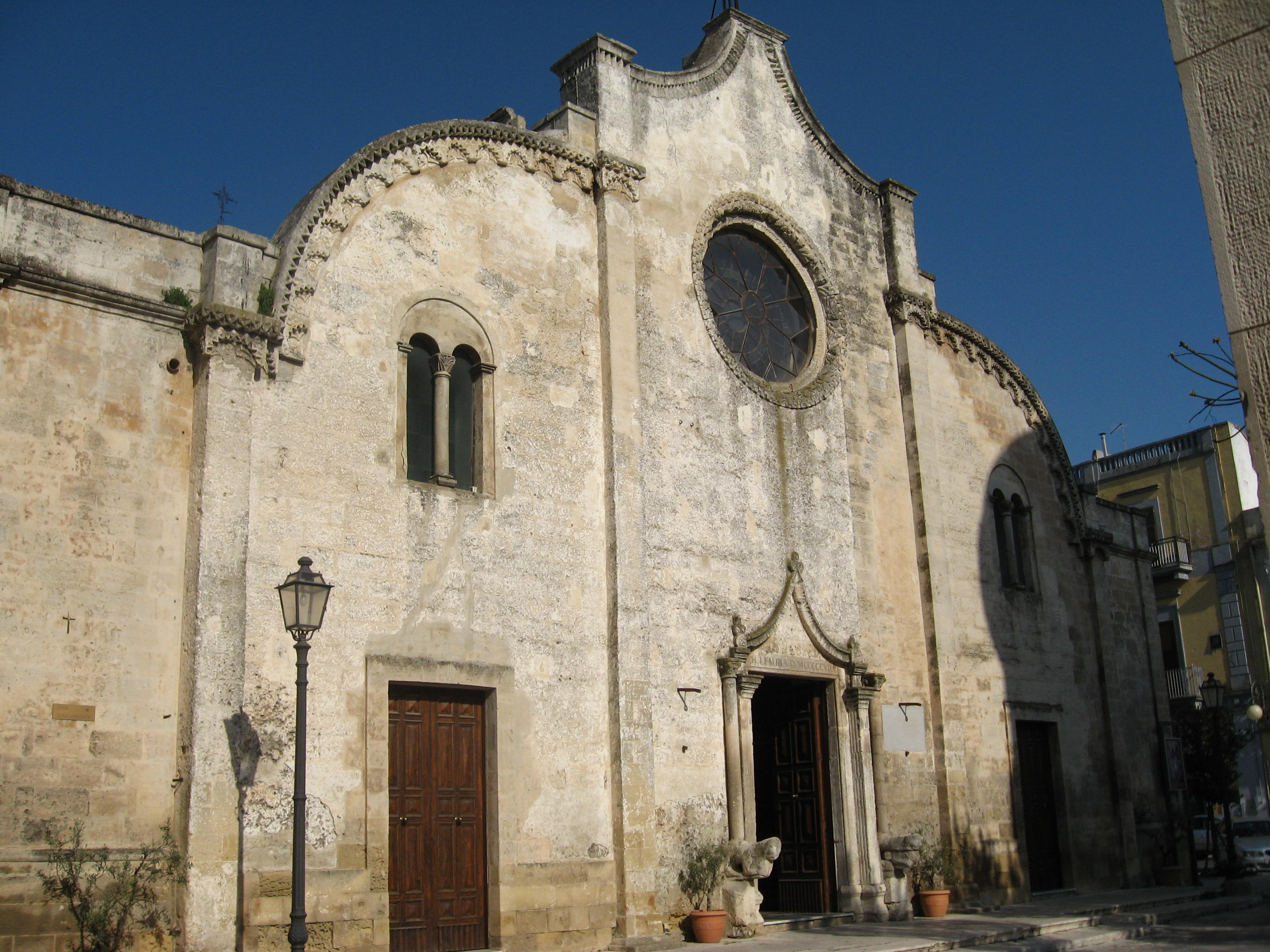
- Church of Santa Maria Assunta in Mottola
- Nickname: Spia dello Ionio
- Location within Italy Location within Apulia
- Coordinates: 40°38′N 17°02′E
- Country: Italy
- Region: Apulia
- Province: Taranto
- Founded: 1300 BC

Government
  - Mayor: Giovanni Piero Barulli

Area
  - Total: 213.96 km^{2} (82.61 sq mi)
- Elevation: 387 m (1,270 ft)

Population (31 December 2017)
  - Total: 15,842
  - Density: 74.042/km^{2} (191.77/sq mi)
- Demonym: Mottolesi
- Time zone: UTC+1 (CET)
  - Summer (DST): UTC+2 (CEST)
- Postal code: 74017
- Dialing code: 099
- Patron saint: San Tommaso Becket
- Website: Official website

Mottola (Mottolese: Mòtele, IPA: [ˈmɔːtələ]) is a town and comune in the province of Taranto and region of Apulia in southeast Italy.

It stands on a hill 387 metres (1,270 ft) above mean sea level in the sub-region of Murgia. It is also called "The Ionian Spy" for its strategic geographical position. From various points of the town all of the Gulf of Taranto can be seen. The economy is based mostly on agriculture and food production (olives, wine, citrus fruits, vegetables). Tourism and the manufacture of wooden fixtures are also being developed.

== History ==
Mottola's hill was inhabited since prehistory, as testified by several findings from that age.

In 1023, a castellum was built here by Byzantine catapan Basil Boioannes. During the subsequent Norman domination, the town became a diocese until 1818, when it lost the title for Castellaneta.

In 1653 the fief was sold to Francesco Caracciolo, Duke of Martina Franca. After the Italian unification, Mottola was a center of Brigandage.

== Geography and climate ==
Mottola enjoys a typical Mediterranean climate, with the greatest amounts of precipitation mainly occurring from mid-October to mid-April; any precipitation is sparse during summer and it generally takes the form of showers and/or thunderstorms. The average temperature varies from a low of 5 °C (41 °F) in January to a high of 28 °C (82 °F) in July and August. The wettest months are December and March averaging between 15 and 20 centimetres (5.9 and 7.9 in). Fog is highly usual in the town centre but it is less frequent in the outskirts, specially in the south part. Spring and fall (autumn) are considered ideal seasons for sightseeing and various outdoor activities. Summers can be particularly hot.

Climate data for Mottola
Month	Jan	Feb	Mar	Apr	May	Jun	Jul	Aug	Sep	Oct	Nov	Dec	Year
Mean daily maximum °F (°C)	54 (12)	54 (12)	58 (14)	63 (17)	71 (22)	78 (26)	83 (28)	83 (28)	78 (26)	70 (21)	61 (16)	56 (13)	68 (20)
Mean daily minimum °F (°C)	41 (5)	41 (5)	44 (7)	48 (9)	55 (13)	62 (17)	67 (19)	67 (19)	62 (17)	56 (13)	48 (9)	43 (6)	53 (12)
Average precipitation inches (mm)	1.9 (48)	1.9 (48)	2.8 (71)	1.2 (30)	1.3 (33)	1.9 (48)	0.8 (20)	1.2 (30)	2 (51)	2.3 (58)	2 (51)	2.8 (71)	17.49 (444)
Source: weatherbase.com

== Main sights ==
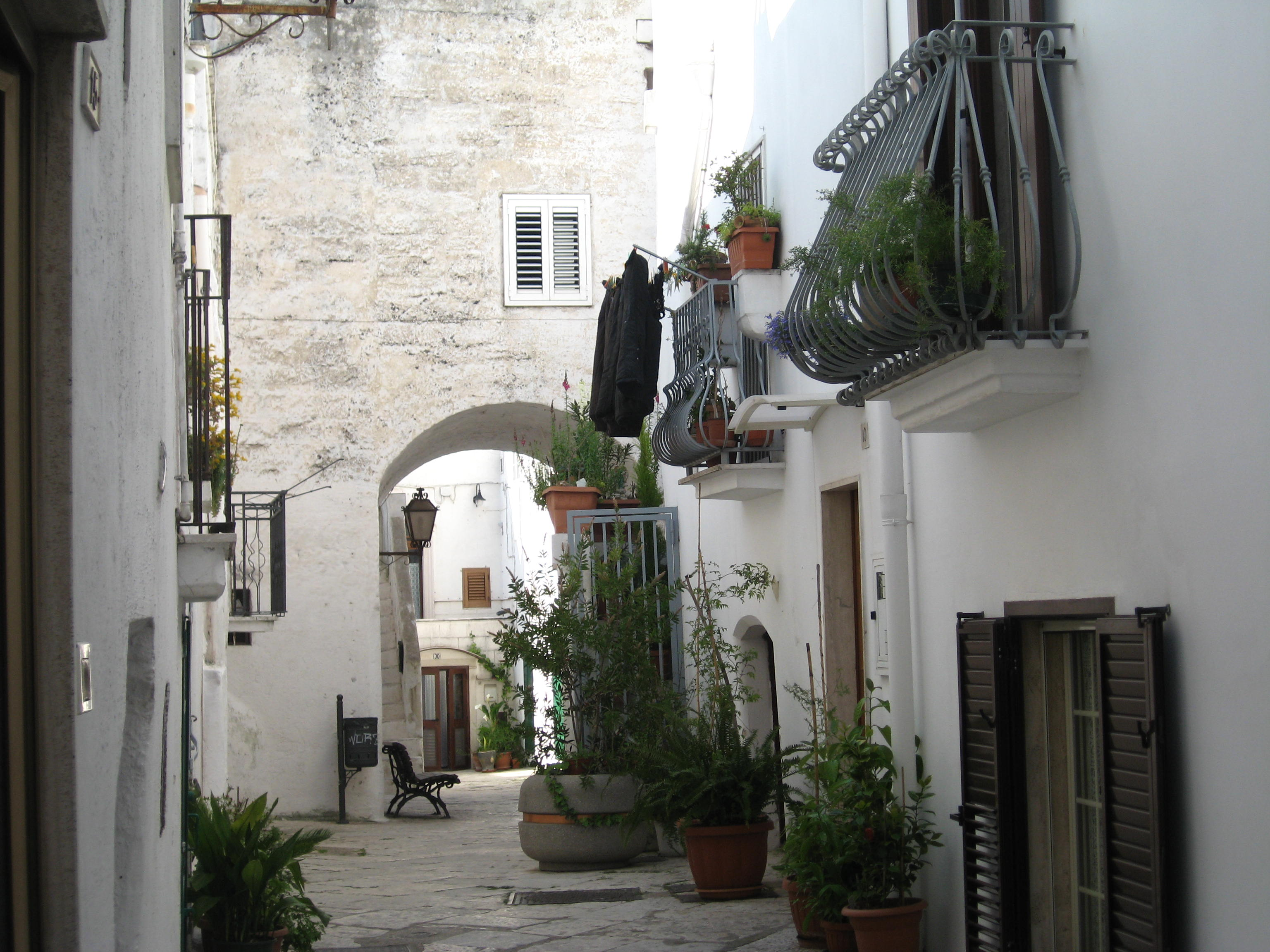
A narrow street of the historical centre.

- The cathedral (13th century, enlarged in 1507) and the Byzantine cave churches, dates from the medieval period, among which the most important are Saint Nicholas, Saint Margaret and Saint Angelus situated in frazione Casalrotto.
- The town has a particularly beautiful "old city" surrounded by stone walls with prominent Baroque gates leading to piazzas and winding, tiny streets. The Piazza XX Settembre is the largest open space in the city, with a greenspace in the center of a largely rectangular place.
- In the historic centre are present the Saint Mary ex-cathedral (12th century), Our Lady of Mount Carmel church (17th century), Immaculate church (17th century), Saint Mary of Constantinople chapel (16th century), and a part of Hellenistic wall (6th–4th century BCE). At the end of historic part of the town, is located a roundabout, from which can be viewed the landscape of the western part of the Province of Taranto.

== Archaeological sites ==
Mottola country is rich of karsts called "gravine", usually situated in the south side of the town. The most important are Forcella, San Biagio, di Capo Gavito and Petruscio. The last one is certainly the most predominant.

== Holy Week rites ==
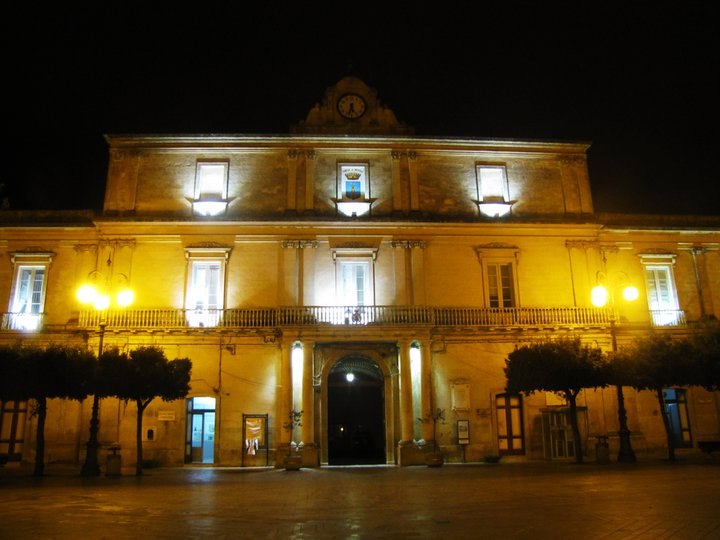
Mottola City Hall

There are numerous religious events during the Holy Week in Mottola. These events are characterized by typical processions, celebrating the Passion, made by hooded faithfuls called "paranze" in the last days of the week. The processions take place through the streets of the historical centre and end in the Our Lady of Mount Carmel church, that is also the organizer church.

== Notable people ==
- Nicola Legrottaglie (footballer, born 1976)
- Luigi Mastrangelo (volleyball player, born 1975)
- Antonella Palmisano (racewalking, born 1991)
- Giovanni D'Onghia (volleyball coach, born 1963)
- Oronzo Mario Scarano (composer, 1847–1901)
- Lorenzo Semeraro (composer and professor at Conservatorio Luigi Cherubini in Florence, 1914–89)

== See also ==
- Karst topography
- Murgia
- Terra d'Otranto
