= Sebastiano De Albertis =

Italian painter

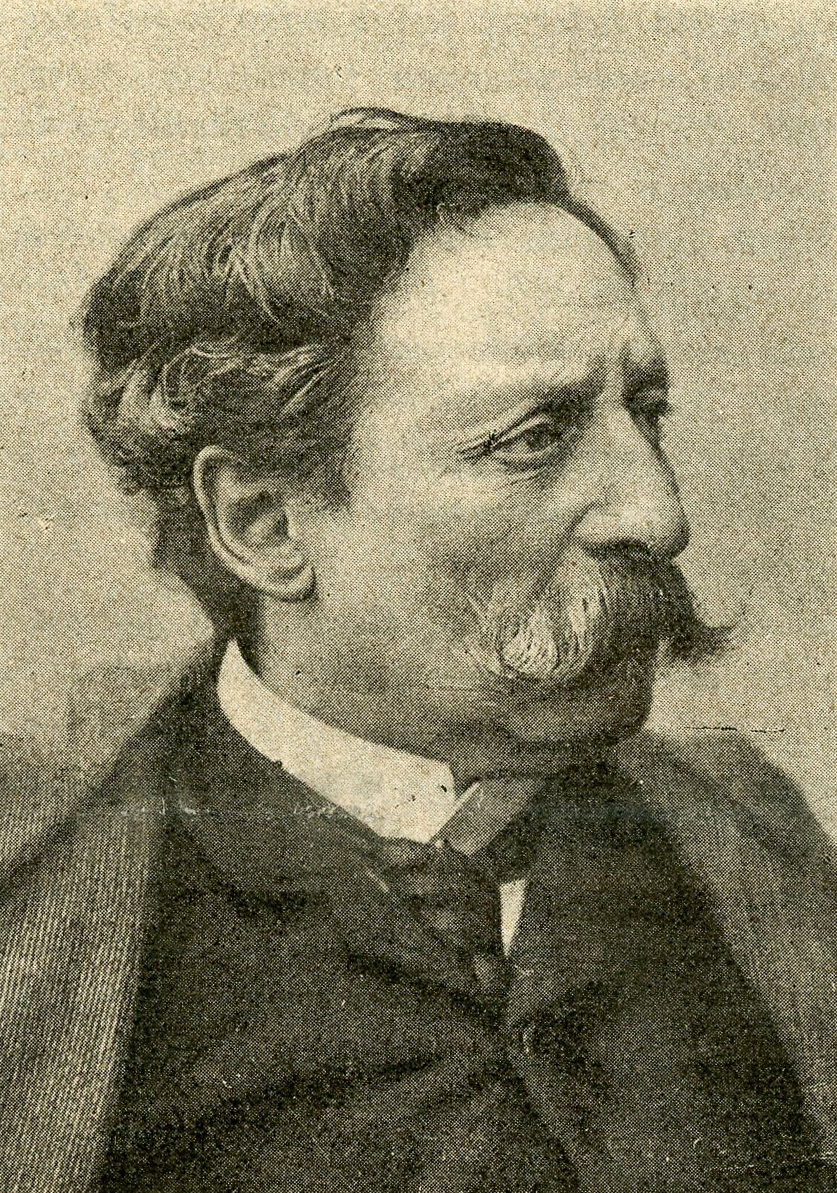
Portrait of Sebastiano De Albertis

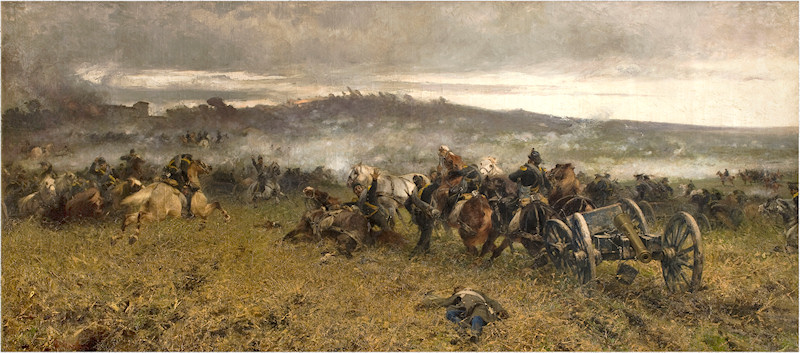
The Artillery of the IIIrd Division attacking during the Battle of San Martino, 1887 (Fondazione Cariplo)

Sebastiano De Albertis (14 January 1828 – 29 November 1897) was an Italian painter.

== Biography ==
De Albertis was born in Milan, Austrian Empire. He worked in the studios of the history painters Domenico and Gerolamo Induno and Roberto Focosi while studying at the Brera Academy of Fine Arts. His participation in the Brera exhibitions with works of social commitment on historical subjects was initially irregular because of his involvement as a volunteer in the nationalistic uprisings and wars of independence. His work focused as from 1855 on the military and patriotic genre with a rich repertoire of battle scenes repeated in a range of variations, which gradually became his speciality. On returning to Milan, he joined the Società della Confusion – which took institutionalised form as the Circolo degli Artisti in 1875 – together with Tranquillo Cremona and Eleuterio Pagliano.

This cultural climate gravitating around the Scapigliatura movement was the background to the artist's first watercolours and works of a less committed nature characterised by events and aspects of contemporary life, including the celebrated horse-racing scenes. The premature death of his only son Enrico in 1874 was followed by a return to painting of a patriotic character and marked social commitment. The recipient of numerous official awards, he was appointed a member of the committee for the creation of Milan's Museo del Risorgimento in 1884. His Work Scena militare, 1887, is by Museo Cantonale d'Arte of Lugano.

One of his pupils was Emilio Gola.

== Other projects ==
Media related to Sebastiano De Albertis at Wikimedia Commons
