= Macchiato =

Macchiato is an Italian word meaning 'stained', and may refer to:

- Caffè macchiato
- Latte macchiato

== Other uses ==
- Wey Macchiato, a compact luxury crossover SUV
- Macchiati, surname
