= Emilio Gola =

Italian painter (1851–1923)

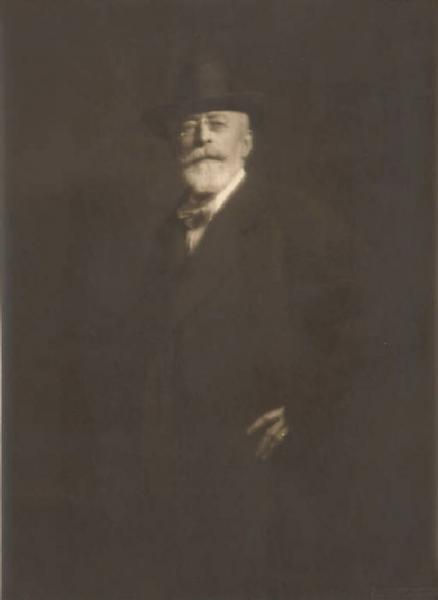
- Emilio Gola
- Born: 22 February 1851; Milan, Kingdom of Lombardy–Venetia
- Died: 21 December 1923 (aged 72); Milan, Kingdom of Italy
- Known for: Painting
- Movement: Impressionism

Emilio Gola (22 February 1851 – 21 December 1923) was an Italian Impressionist painter.

== Biography ==
Born in Milan, then part of the Austrian Empire, into a noble family, Gola was encouraged to develop his interest in art in his adolescence by his father, a dilettante painter. He graduated in industrial engineering from the Polytechnic University of Milan in 1873. He did not enrol at the Brera Academy, but took private lessons from Sebastiano De Albertis. At the same time he became interested in the works of Tranquillo Cremona and Daniele Ranzoni. His wealthy family background enabled him to make a series of visits to France, the Netherlands and England where he encountered the work of foreign artists.

Gola made his artistic début at the Brera Annual Exhibition in 1879 with a Study from Life and Head: Study from Life. His early work was already noted for its strong colour combinations and vigorous brushwork, as in the portrait of Contessa Gola, Mother of the Artist (c. 1882). Gola participated regularly in national exhibitions, but obtained his greatest official recognition at the European level. By the 1880s he was an esteemed portrait who depicted women of the Milanese nobility in their fashionable, worldly dimension but with a vigorously naturalistic approach. His portraits were accompanied by a rich repertoire of views of Milan and the countryside of Brianza in bright colours that were to constitute his stylistic hallmark. Active in the region of Liguria and Venice, he focused in his late period on seascapes distinguished by great formal synthesis and expressive intensity. One of his pupils was Alberto Malaspina.

== Work ==
Gola’s oeuvre can be divided principally by subject-matter: landscapes with figures, mostly executed in Brianza, such as Washerwoman (1898; Galleria d'Arte Moderna, Milan) and Landscape: The First Thaw (1892; priv. col.); the Milanese canals (St. Christopher’s Canal, c. 1890; Milan, Nuovo Banco Ambrosiano); seascapes, particularly of Alassio and the Venetian lagoon (Beach at Alassio, 1915–18; Milan, Galleria d'Arte Moderna, Milan); and portraits (Marchesa Emilia Sommi Picenardi, c. 1900, Rome, Galleria Nazionale d'Arte Moderna).

Gola was influenced by the work of the Scapigliati, particularly by their use of juxtaposed or superimposed brushstrokes to attain certain effects of light and colour. However, his subject-matter was different, his colours more brilliant, his brushwork freer, occasionally virtually ignoring form, and at times his figures seem carelessly positioned on the canvas. At his most successful, however, he could produce such splendidly original works as his several interpretations (in oil and watercolour) of the theme Washerwomen at Mondonico (e.g. ex-Chiesa priv. col., Milan).

== Selected paintings ==
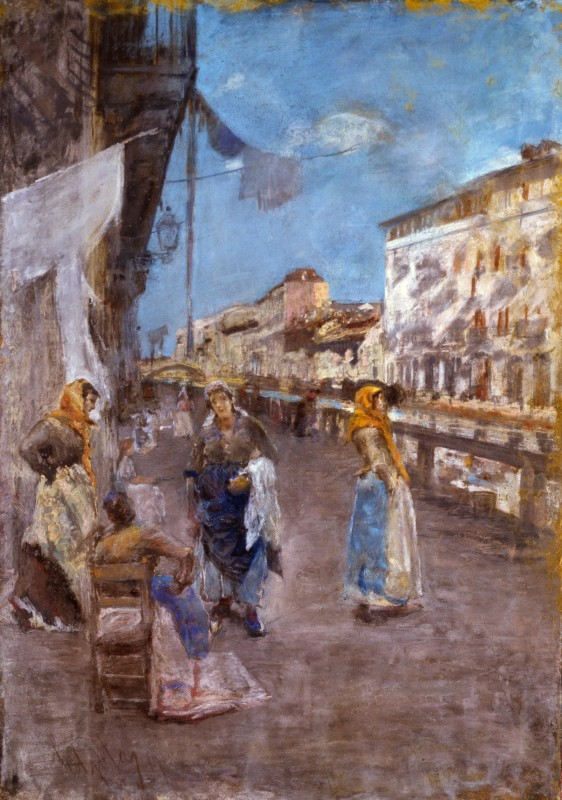
Washerwomen along the Naviglio (c. 1894-99)

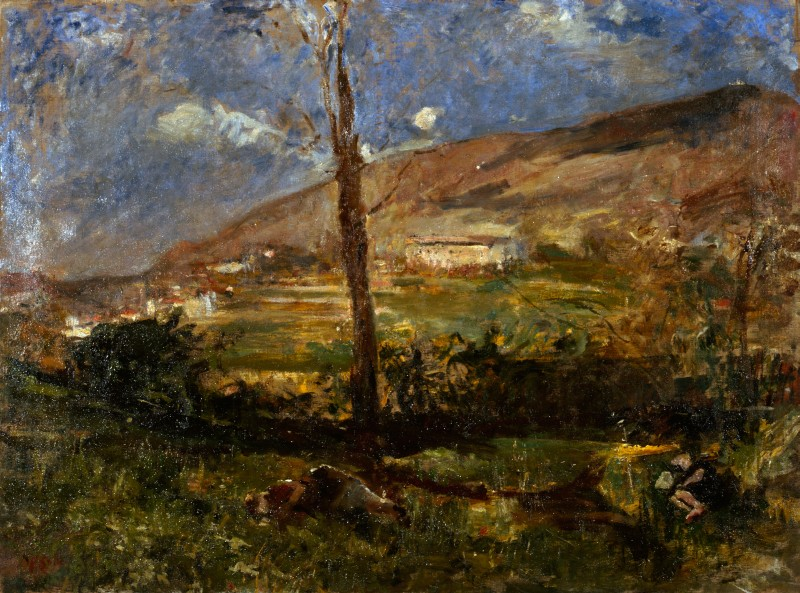
Meriggio (1922)

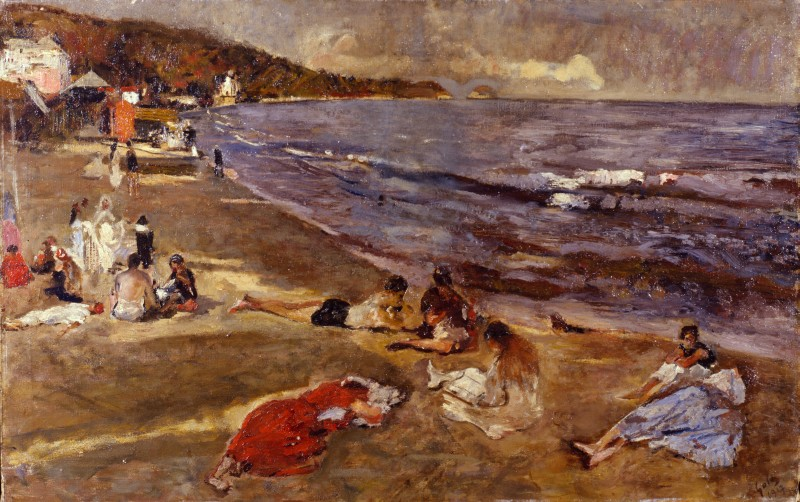
Sulla spiaggia di Alassio (1917)

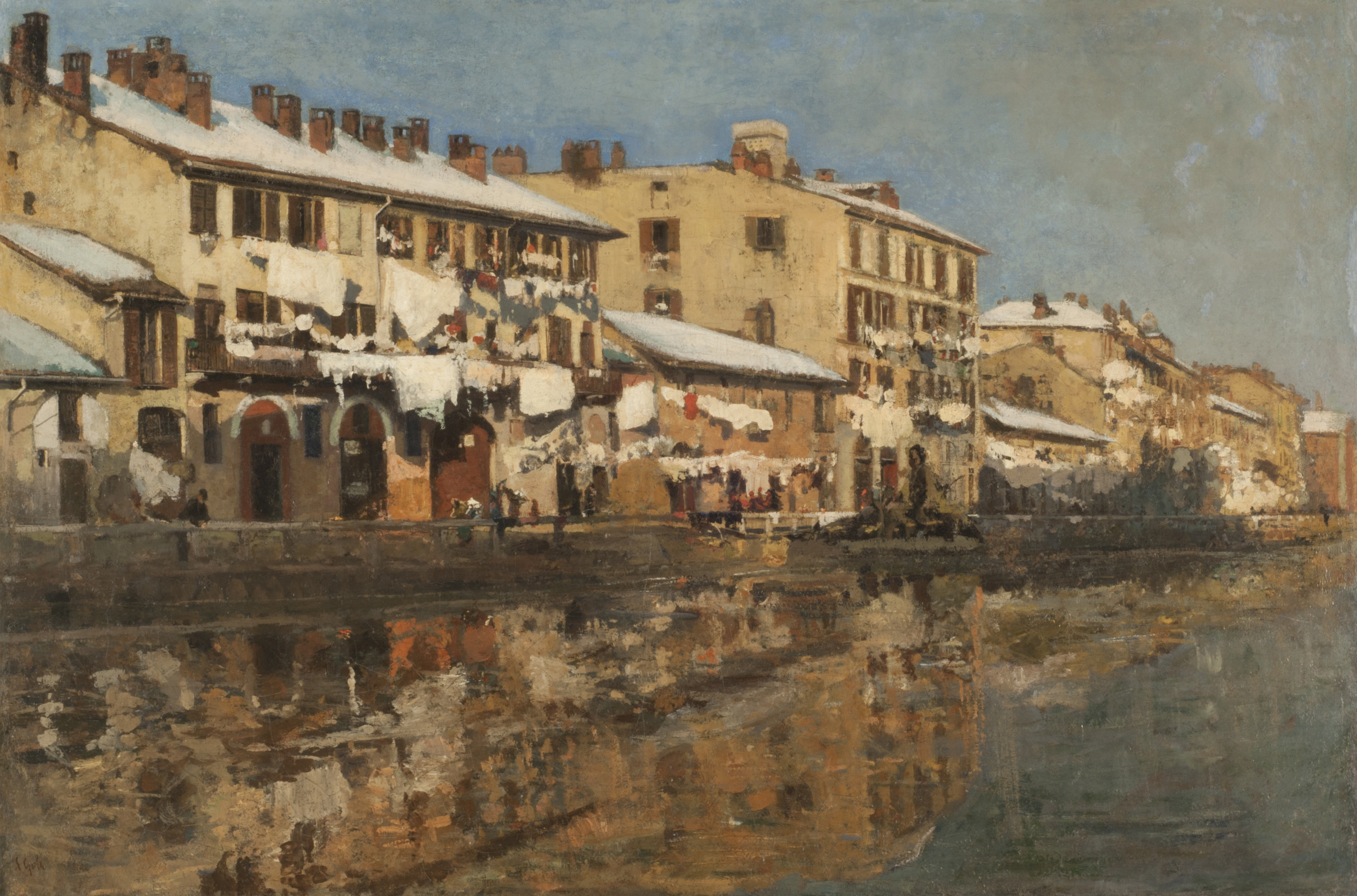
The Naviglio of Milan

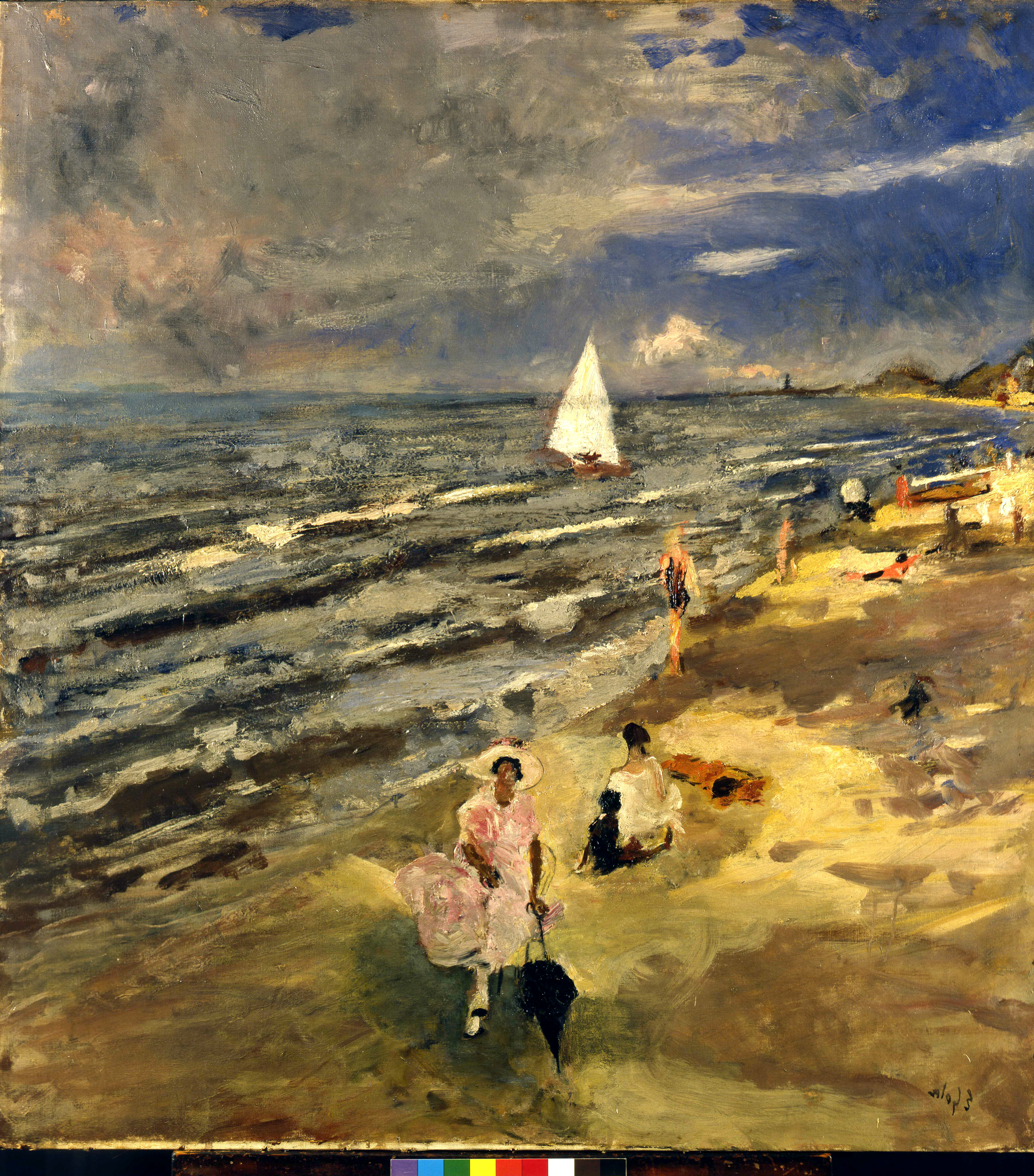
Seaside

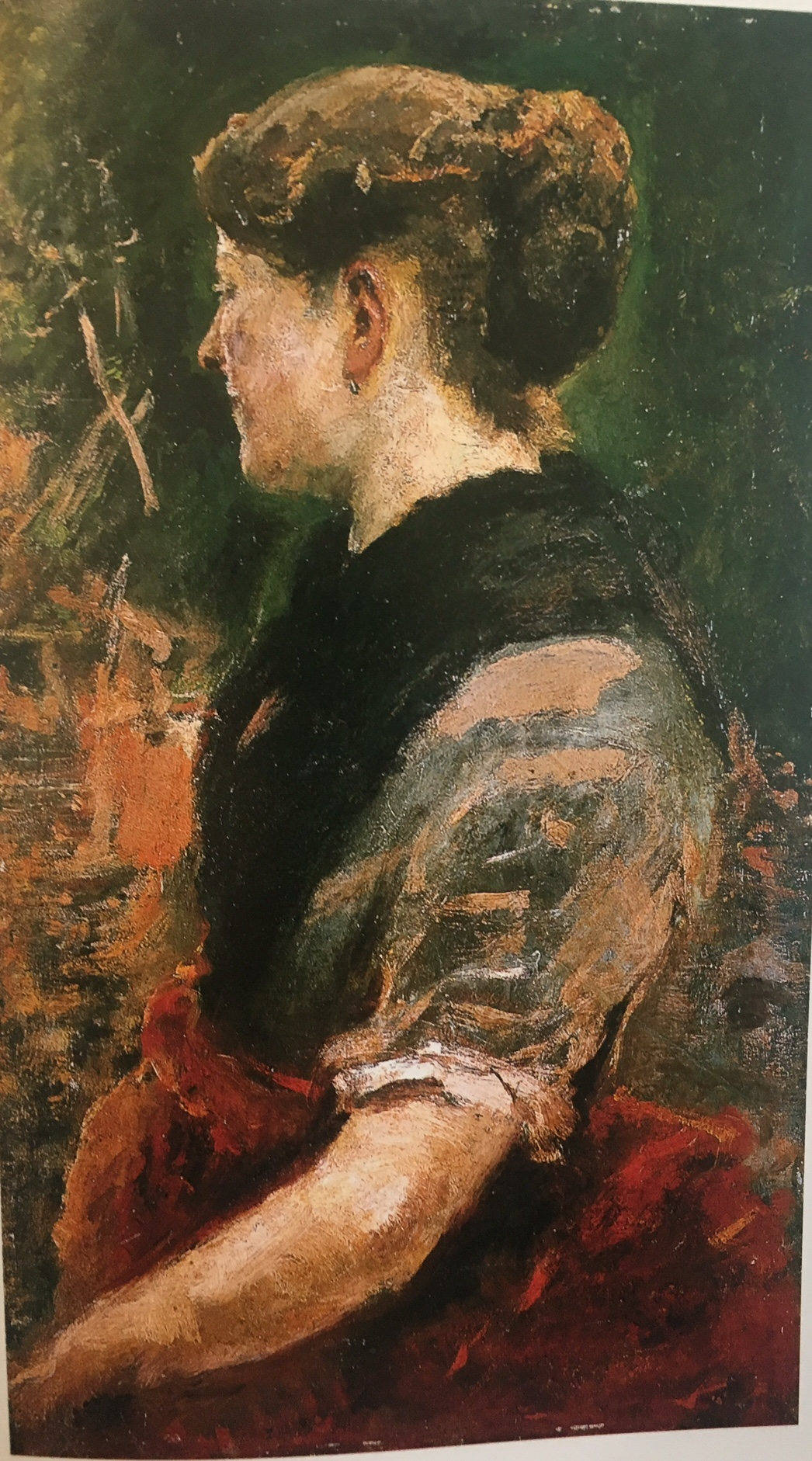
Young woman

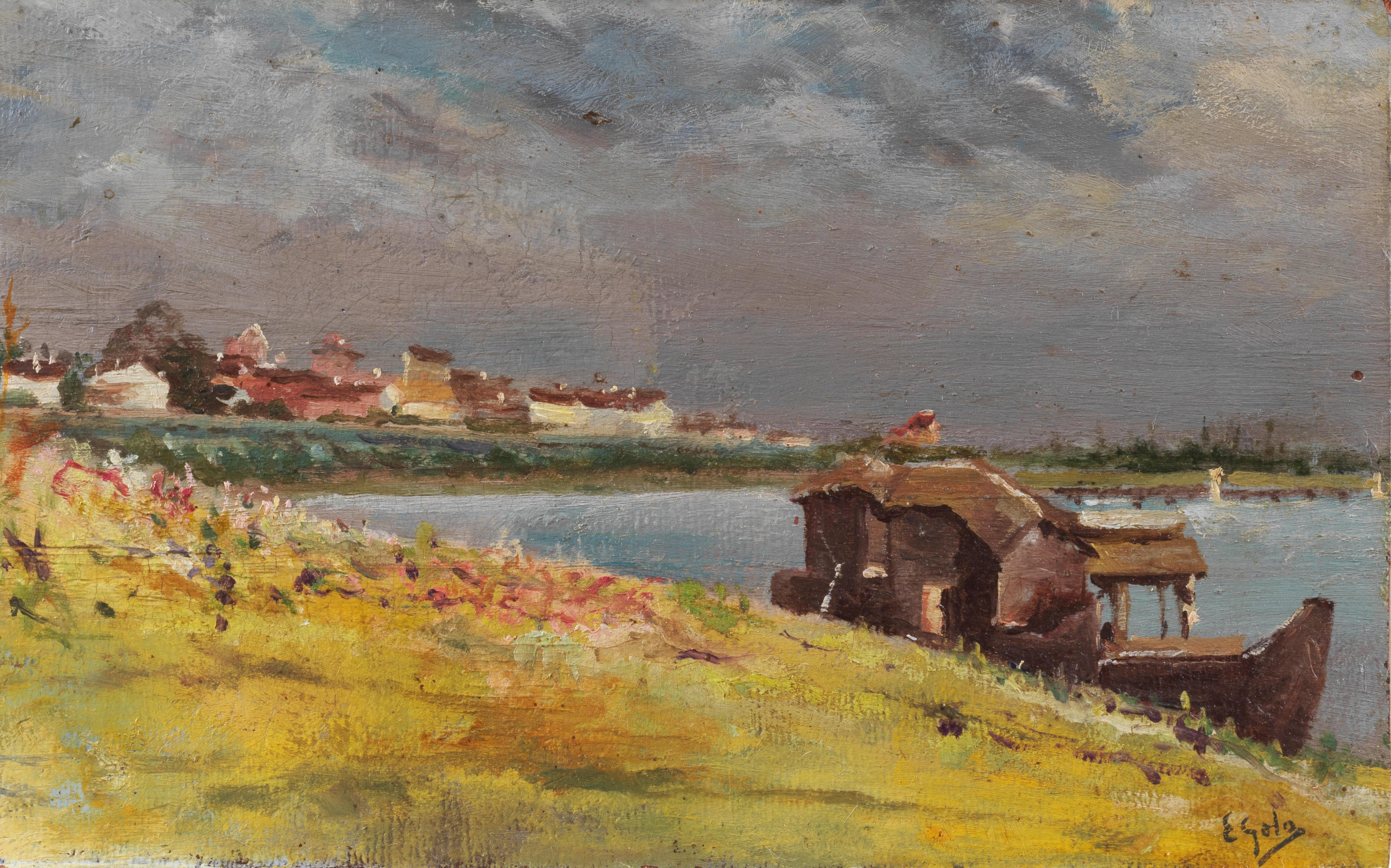
View of the Naviglio (1923)

== Bibliography ==
- Elena Lissoni, Emilio Gola, online catalogue Artgate by Fondazione Cariplo, 2010, CC BY-SA (source for the first revision of this article).
