= Remo Rossi =

Swiss sculptor (1909–1982)

- Born: 27 September 1909; Locarno, Switzerland
- Died: 30 December 1982 (aged 73); Bern, Switzerland
- Education: Accademia di Belle Arti di Brera, École des Beaux-Arts
- Known for: Sculpture, painting

Remo Rossi (27 September 1909 – 30 December 1982) was a Swiss sculptor, who lived in Locarno in Ticino, Switzerland.

== Early life and family ==
Remo Rossi was born on 27 September 1909, in Locarno, Switzerland. Both Ettore, his father, and Gualtiero, his grandfather, came from Arzo (Ticino, Switzerland) and were active as marble artisans and sculptors (called marmorini). Remo's mother was from the Jacometti family living in Intra (a small town on the Italian shores of Lago Maggiore.)

Nesto Jacometti, graphic designer and collector, an uncle on his mother's side, became an important link for Remo with the French cultural world. In the main church of Arzo, built in 1600, Remo's great-grandfather Antonio had sculpted the Pulpito marmoreo. Records indicate that Antonio died in Locarno in 1898, thus suggesting that the family had already moved from Arzo in the early 19th century. Remo's grandfather Gualtiero was born in Locarno in 1852, where he died in 1930. Ettore, Remo's father, built his first Atelier (workshop) just below his house located in Piazza Castello. Since he needed more space to work on large stone blocks, Ettore built another Atelier in the Saleggi area of Locarno. Later on, these two buildings became the headquarters of the Casetta architectural studio.

== Education ==
After finishing the obligatory schools in 1924, Remo continued his studies at the high school of Sankt Michael in Zug. In 1925 he was a pupil of professor Joseph von Moos at the Kunstgewerbeschule of Lucerne (or Lucerne School of Arts and Crafts). The essential phase of his training was during his studies in Milan from 1926, where he enrolled at the Accademia di Brera where in 1926 he followed the drawing courses of Contardo Barbieri and the anatomy courses of professor Biaggi, but refused to follow the sculpture lectures of Wildt. At the same time, he worked in the private workshop of Ernesto Bazzaro in Milan, and followed courses at the architectural high school at the Castello Sforzesco under the guidance of professor Mariani. His first works were evidently impregnated by an academic style: first of all the large sculpture Memento mori (1930).

After several study travels to Bologna, Florence, Rome, Naples, and Venice he settled for one year in Paris in 1932. Here he encountered Alberto Martíni and Gino Severini with whom he shall later collaborate in 1950 for the decoration of the Church the Capucins of Sion.

While in Paris, Remo followed the courses of Paul Landowski at the Académie Nationale des Beaux-Arts as well as the lectures of Charles Despiau at the Académie Scandinave. Despiau invited Remo to work in his own atelier. Fruit of that period were the works exhibited at the Salon de Printemps in 1933.

== Career ==
=== Back to Locarno ===
In 1934 Remo came back to Locarno and elected his birthplace as the preferred place for his activity, interrupting it by frequent but rather short study travels to Munich, Nürnberg, Berlin and Paris (académie Scandinave and Académie Nationale des Beaux-Arts).

Among the works influenced by his time in Paris, particularly by Aristide Maillol, are sculptures of bathing women with generous proportions, as well as several funerary works depicting young women in poses of prayer and mourning. These include Donna che accende un lumino (1933–34), Meditazione (now located in Ascona), and other works in the cemeteries of Bellinzona and Locarno.

In 1943 Remo married Bianca Bernasconi. Their son Giancarlo was born in 1944.

The works of that period have profoundly marked the public space of the Cantone Ticino, such as the Minerva (1941) placed at the Cantonal library of Lugano; the Monument to Giuseppe Motta close to the railroad station of Bellinzona; the Foca (1945, sea lion) located in the centre of the fountain facing the governmental building in Bellinzona, and the Pegaso, a several tons sculpture posted in 1956 at 100 feet height on the governmental building itself.

=== Representative works ===
In the Giardini Rusca of Locarno we can still admire the Toro (bull, 1953) donated to the city in 1975 to commemorate the 50th anniversary of the Locarno's Pact.

Close to the Toro we find also the Bagnante (bathing woman, 1954) placed in the corresponding fountain. Besides the above two sculptures that characterize his native city, we shall cite also the San Carlo Borromeo a cavallo of the year 1980, placed at the entrance of the public retirement home in Via Vallemaggia.

In the municipal building of Locarno, the sculpture Concerto (1956) was donated from the foundation Remo Rossi in September 2009 to commemorate the 100th anniversary of the birth of the artist. Another copy of the bronze Concerto is displayed at the Palazzo dei congressi in Lugano.

Just outside the railroad station of Chiasso, one can admire Remo's Acrobata (1958) which stays in equilibrium on a single hand. On the gardens along the lake shore of Lugano, we can admire a copy of the Pavone in filigrana style, analogously adopted for the Storie della vita della Vergine in the Chapel of Villa Erica in Locarno. The cemeteries of the main towns of the Cantone Ticino host a great number of stone or bronze sculptures of Remo Rossi, and in several cases, there are replicas of an initial project.

In the period between 1950 and 1972, Remo Rossi accomplished several study travels in Spain, Greece, Belgium, England, Turkey, France, Austria, Hungary and Russia.

Here below is a list of the works of Remo Rossi that are publicly visible outside the territory of Ticino: - Place, Title, Year - List to be completed

=== The Ateliers ===
In 1959 Remo Rossi began constructing his complex of Ateliers in via Nessi. These ateliers became the gathering point of local and international artists and hosted famous names who became close friends of Remo such as Jean Arp, Otto Charles Bänniger, Jacob Probst, Hans Richter Fritz Glarner, Italo Valenti, Ingeborg Lüscher, Gudrun Müller, Marco Gurtner, Pedro Pedrazzini, Ernesto Ornati and many others.

=== Public duties ===
From 1962 to 1972 Remo Rossi assumed the duty of general officer for Switzerland at the Biennale di Venezia. In 1965 he promoted the Contemporary arts museum at the Castello visconteo, a museum of which he became curator. This museum was started also thanks to the donation by the Arp's to whom Remo was bound by a profound friendship. The works displayed at that museum represent one of the highest points in the city's art collection.

In 1966 Remo Rossi became a member of the Board of the foundation Pro Arte and in 1969 he became also a member of the Board of the foundation Gottfried Keller. In 1948 Remo became a member of the Swiss federal commission for fine arts, a commission of which he became vice-president in 1954 and then president from 1969 until 1979. Some of his critical circles have defined that presidency period as conducted with a "dictatorial" attitude by Remo Rossi. Knowing the robust character of Remo, this definition is not that much surprising.

=== Exhibitions ===
Remo Rossi participated in a very large number of collective exhibits, both in Switzerland and abroad, and he was granted numerous awards in his over fifty years of artistic career. The last exhibit in chronological order was at the Villa Malpensata in Lugano just after his death (1983).

== Death ==
Remo Rossi died in Bern in 1982 and was buried in the cemetery of Locarno in the family tomb that is graced by the Croce fiorita (flowering cross, 1968) sculpted by Remo himself. A redimensioned version of the Croce fiorita was an official gift of the Swiss Confederation to Pope Paul VI when he visited Geneva in 1969.

== Style and impact ==
The style of Remo Rossi was modified over the years from the pure academic level of the 1930s and 1940s which was maximally expressed in the feminine nudes and with the rounded shapes of large animals. Remo then progressed to more geometric and rigid shapes in several Opere di arte sacra, in the Acrobati, and in scenes portraying humans and animals. The de-materialisation observable in the latest works seems to be inspired by the shapes typical of Alberto Giacometti in which the plasticity loses compactness and where the empty spaces prevail over the filled spaces.

Rossi was mostly appreciated for his cemeterial art as well as for his highly visible art pieces that decorated several public buildings in Ticino and in Switzerland and ultimately also for the numerous commemoration coins that were mandated to him by the Federal, Cantonal and Communal public authorities.

Several artists have corresponded with Remo Rossi or were close friends, visited him in his Ateliers or at his house in Locarno. His wife Bianca often had to cook risotto or spaghetti even late at night for the guests. In fact, Remo Rossi has been part of the attraction for intellectuals and artists of the region of Locarno over the years 1930-1980.

== Foundation Remo Rossi ==
The Foundation Remo Rossi is a non-profit association with the purpose of promoting and valorising the work and the artistic heritage of Remo Rossi.

The FRR has also the intention to offer to young artists who have been granted Swiss federal fellowships or to Ticino's students who have accomplished their studies at the Brera's academy (or with analogous training), the possibility of residing and working in the ateliers of the Saleggi, once these latter will be conveniently restructured.

The purpose is to revive the spirit of the ancient "Via dei marmi" (today "Via A. Nessi"). With this, one should be able to recapitulate the artistical-cultural ambiente which rotated around the character and charisma of Remo Rossi towards the beginning of the sixties.

The Foundation has opened a provisory Museum (Museo Remo Rossi) and in the mid-term term will also make accessible the Art collection of Remo and a Documentation centre. All these shall be situated in the family house of Remo Rossi in Via Rusca in Locarno.

The foundation was started by following the will of Remo's son Giancarlo, who died in 2008.
