= Riccardo Cessi =

Italian painter (1840–1913)

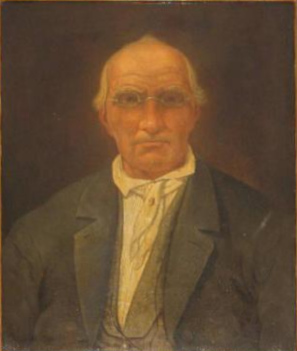
Portrait of Carlo Montecchi, late 19th century

Riccardo Cessi (1840 – 27 February 1913) was an Italian painter, mostly active in Veneto.

== Biography ==
Of Mantuan origin, he was born in 1840 in Dosolo. He studied at the Brera Academy, and in the late 1870s moved to Rovigo, where he reached the peak in his career.

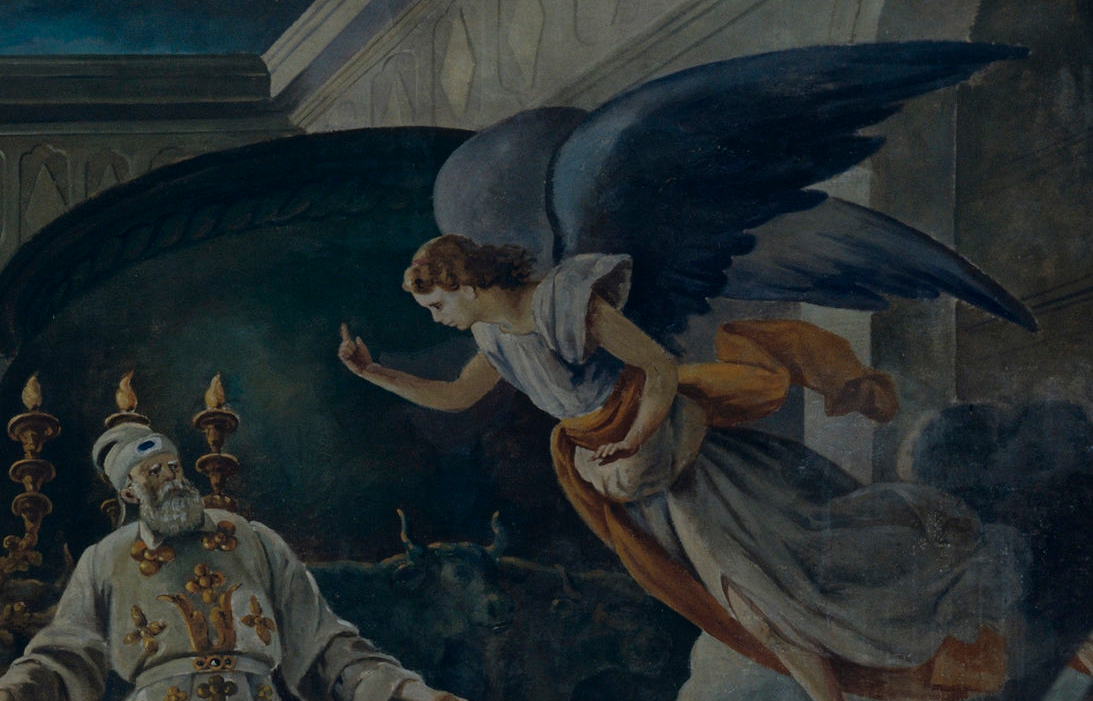
Detail of The Annunciation to Zecheriah, 1892

He painted choirs and chapels in Rovigo, painting the frescoes of, among others, the Church of San Michele and the Church of Saint Dominic in the city. Other works include the frescoes at the parish of Pincara, and the Church of San Martino in Venice. He was also a portrait painter, and painted, among others, a portrait of Alessandro Manzoni, now belonging to the painter's descendants. He almost completed an illustration of the Divine Comedy in watercolor. Another portrait of Manzoni, in pen, is at the Liceo Manzoni in Milan. A pen portrait of Ludovico Ariosto is now at the Municipio of Ferrara.

It has been said that he was able of "combining illustrative fidelity and lyricism". He had mostly ecclesiastical commissions, painting Biblical scenes. It was with the works painted for the Church that he reached his greatest achievements, being able to combine his modern academic knowledge to the classics.

He founded a drawing school in Lendinara in 1868, and another one in Polesella. He was able to group a large number of followers, and went on painting many churches in the area.

He married Clementina Moretti. Their son, Roberto, born in 1885 in Rovigo, became a noted historian.

He died in Padua, on 27 February 1913.

== Gallery ==
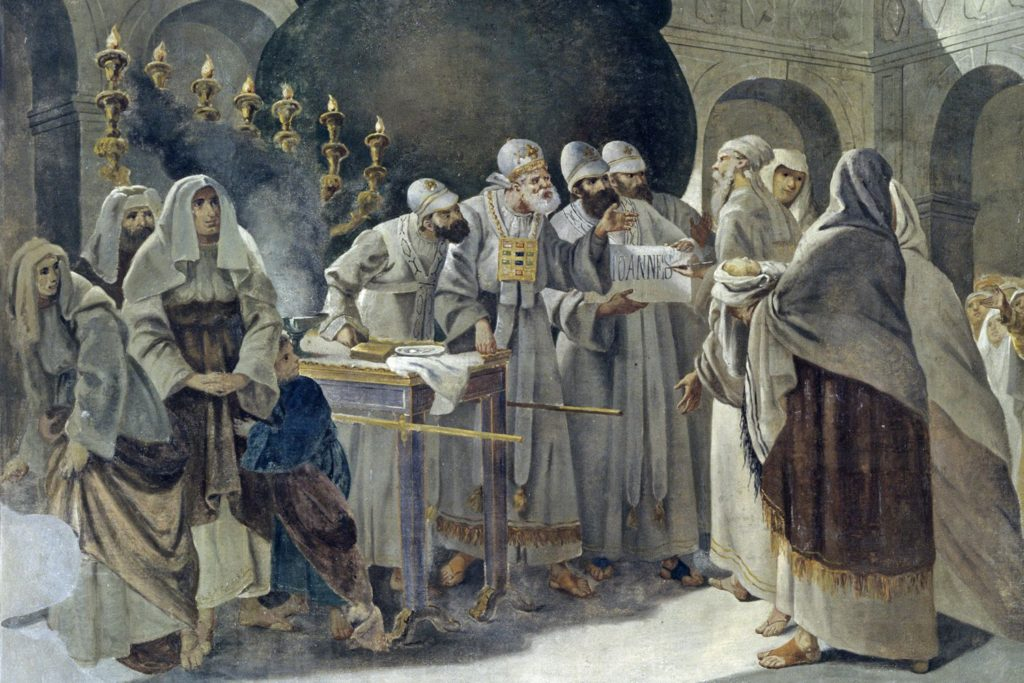
Zechariah Gives Name to John the Baptist (1892)

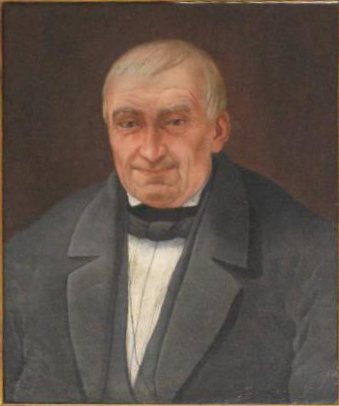
Portrait of Pietro Montecchi (19th century)

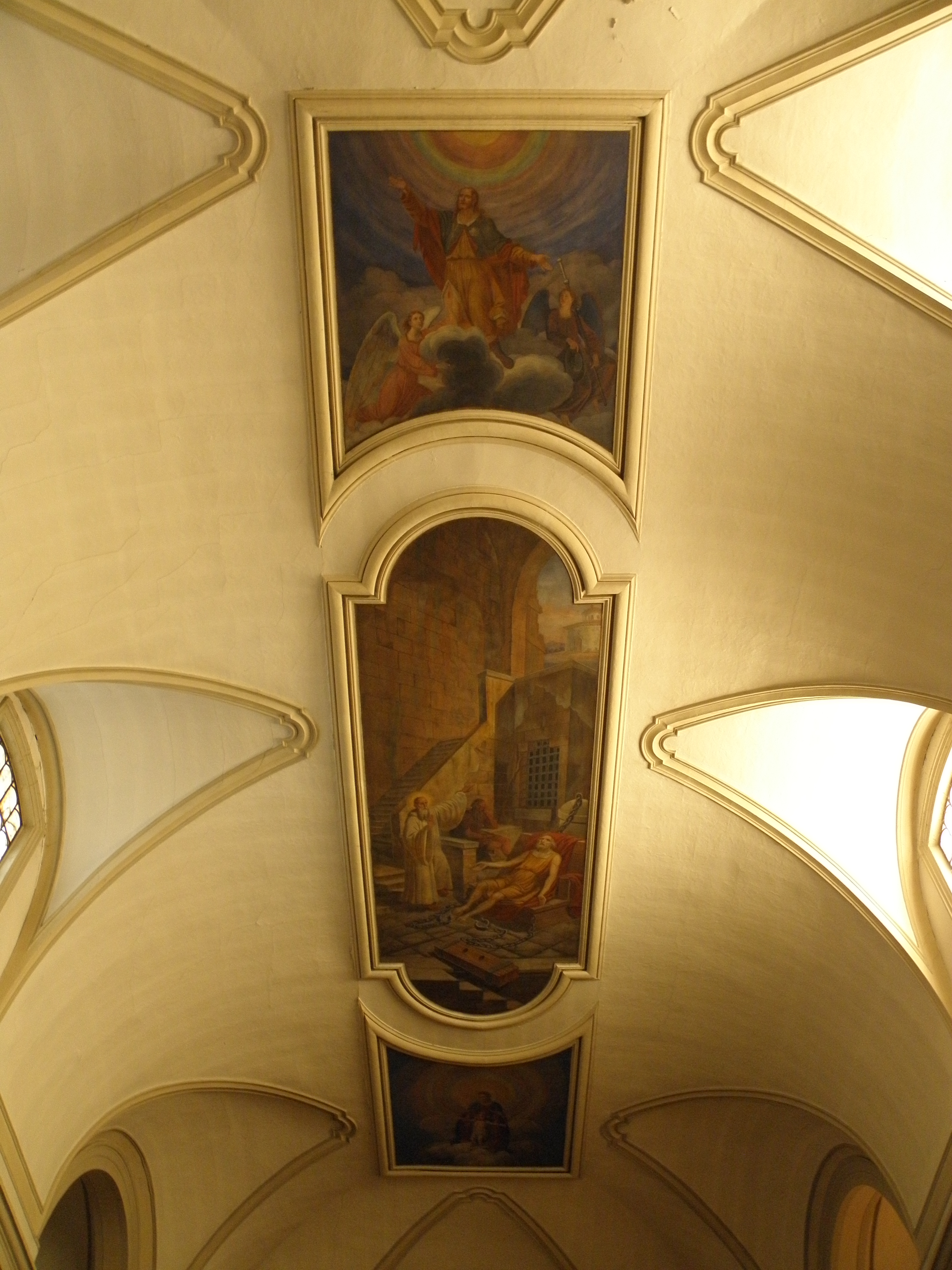
Villadose, Veneto, Italy, chiesa parrocchiale di San Leonardo (parish church of Sant Leonard): interior, ceiling

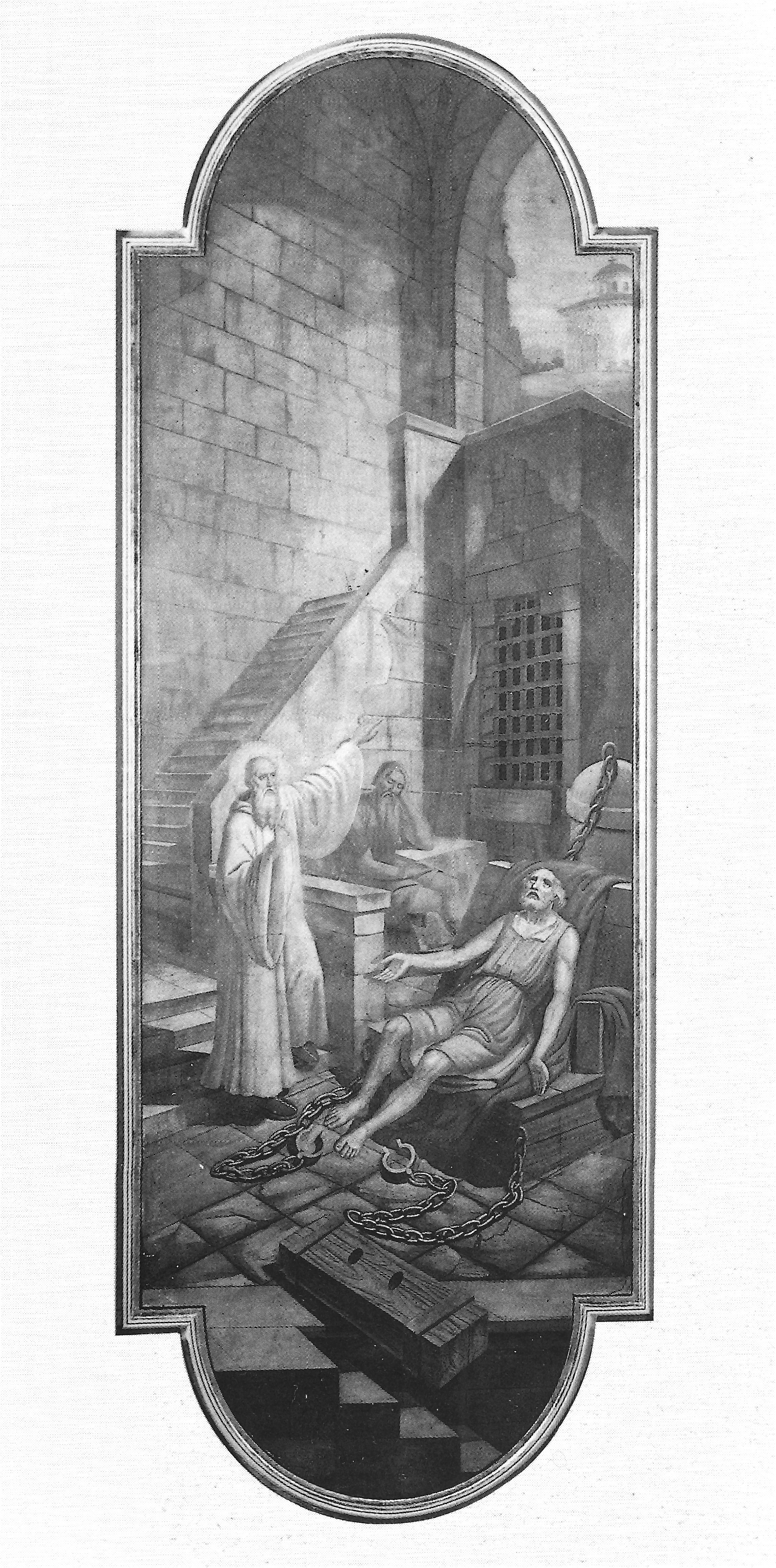
Villadose, chiesa parrocchiale di San Leonardo: interior, ceiling, Il Patrono San Leonardo libera un prigioniero, oil on canvas (1880)
