= Bartolomeo Schermini =

Italian painter (1841–1896)

Bartolomeo Schermini (1841 in Brescia – 1896) was an Italian painter, mainly of genre scenes and costume pieces.

Schermini was a resident in Brescia, Italy, and he studied at the Brera Academy under Giuseppe Bertini.

He exhibited at the Exposition of Fine Arts, in 1872, in Milan. The painting he exhibited depicted: Una sillaba moderna; Scherzo infantile; Libertà; and in 1881 in the same city, he exhibited a painting titled:, S'ingioiella la sposa; and in Rome, in 1883, he exhibited a painting of costume scene.
