= Riccardo Beretta =

Italian artist

Riccardo Beretta is an Italian artist born in 1982 in Mariano Comense, Como, Italy. He lives and works in Milan.

In 2007 he wrote his graduation thesis, Ricordare tutto Dimenticare tutto ("Remembering Everything Forgetting All"), for the Academy of Fine Arts of Brera, (Milan), using Wikipedia to publish texts, sidestepping the necessary restrictions one has to follow for graduating in Italy.

He collaborates with the contemporary art project Lucie Fontaine (Milan).

== Work ==
Beretta’s work has been defined as “conceptual handicraft” and “hypertextual handicraft”, due to the production methods and to the highly refined execution of his manufacture, where different historical periods and artistic moments appear as synchronous.

In 2009 he had his first one-man exhibition, entitled Ti manco a Milano? (“Do You Miss Me in Milan?”), in Lucie Fontaine gallery, (Milan). From this experience, and a contribution for Call for Proposal: Ri-formare Milano (“Call for Proposal: Re-forming Milan”), MiArt Magazine#02, a collaboration with the Pianissimo gallery in Milan started, in the form of a three-day exhibition (May 21–23, 2009), where the artist showed his desire to open an hostel, called Ostello Universale (“Universal Hostel”), in the centre of Milan.

With Valerio Carubba he worked on the poster design for Performat, the limited edition, long-playing record, composed by Marcella Vanzo for the festival Performa 09 in New York City.

In 2010 he took part in the group exhibition IBRIDO (“Hybryd”) at the PAC, Pavilion of Contemporary Art (Milan), curated by Giacinto Di Pietrantonio and Francesco Garutti. In 2010 he also exhibited in Low Déco show, curated by Alessandro Rabottini, inside the Villa Necchi Campiglio (Milan), producing a special work for the Villa’s garden. Beretta leaned against a tree a wooden inlay sculpture which imitates a marble surface. The work wanted to evoke the research on the surfaces made by the architect Piero Portaluppi, who built the Villa in the years 1932-1935, experiencing a synthesis between Art Deco and Modern architecture.

== Ricordare tutto Dimenticare tutto (Remembering Everything Forgetting All) ==
Ricordare tutto Dimenticare tutto ("Remembering Everything Forgetting All") is Riccardo Beretta’s graduation thesis, discussed at the Academy of Fine Arts of Brera, in Milan, on July 16, 2007. The texts, of which the thesis was composed, had been previously put into and developed within the Italian version of the Wikipedia project. Since 22 January 2007 he has created Alighiero Boetti’s entry, composed another entry on the architect Ettore Sottsass in Wikiquote and “reviewed” five movies directed by Werner Herzog: Fata Morgana, Land of Silence and Darkness, The Great Ecstasy of Woodcarver Steiner, La Soufrière and Lessons of Darkness. Wikipedia has been adopted as a platform where he puts study material, revealing the tautology between the processing procedures and collective updating of the entry Alighiero Boetti and some of his works characterised by a collaborative aesthetic. Moreover, a comparison has been made between assertions of design policy by Sottsass and Herzog’s aesthetic research.

Beretta has worked outside of the guidelines which are commonly used for graduating in Italy; he wrote a thesis that is not the work of a single author, it is published in real time and it is in the public domain. Therefore, the text has never been published as a book and is not an object, but it might one day become one. On July 14, 2007 he used the Italian Wikipedia:Bar, two days before the thesis discussion, to start a comparison with other Wikipedians on the specifics of his own thesis and on the possibilities, consequences and potential of Wikipedia and similar websites as tools in the process.

The thesis supervisor was professor and Director at GAMeC, The Gallery of Modern and Contemporary Art (Bergamo), Giacinto Di Pietrantonio. The course teacher was artist Alberto Garutti.

== Exhibitions ==
Solo exhibitions

2009

Ti manco a Milano?, Lucie Fontaine, Milan

Group exhibitions

2010

L'Archivio Storico: quattro interpretazioni, curated by Francesca Pagliuca, UniCredit Banca Branch, Milan, Italy

Low Déco, curated by Alessandro Rabottini, Villa Necchi Campiglio, Milan, Italy

IBRIDO, curated by Giacinto Di Pietrantonio and Francesco Garutti, PAC, Milan, Italy

2009

Thanksgiving, curated by Vincenzo de Bellis, Bruna Roccasalva, Anna Daneri, Peep-Hole, Milan, Italy

STUDIO VISIT, GC.AC, curated by Andrea Bruciati, Stefano Coletto, Nemanja Cvijanovic, Marco Tagliafierro, Monfalcone, Gorizia, Italy

New Italian Epic, curated by Andrea Bruciati, Brown project space, Milan, Italy

2008

Rough Tape N° 5, curated by Mobeel (with Spectacular Synthesizer), Atelier Bevilacqua La Masa, Venice, Italy

2007-2008

Maestros y discípulos II, Museum of Modern Art Genaro Perez, Cordoba; Casa de Cultura, Salta; Museum of Contemporary Art, Mendoza, Argentina

2007

Alberi d’artista, GAMeC, Bergamo

Rundgang 2007, class of Lothar Baumgarten, Universität der Künste, Berlin, Germany

ArtMeeting 2007, curated by Daniela Ehemann, Universität der Künste, Berlin, Germany

2005

35 X 35, curated by Katia Anguelova, Stecca degli Artigiani, Milan, Italy

Un minuto per la Stecca, curated by Alessandra Poggianti, Katia Anguelova and Bert Theis, Stecca degli Artigiani, Milan, Italy

2004

Salon Primo 2004, Museo della Permanente, Milan, Italy

21/12, independent exhibition, Milan, Italy

== Bibliography ==
- Low Déco, Lucia Borromeo, Michele D'Aurizio, Alessandro Rabottini, Milan, KALEIDOSCOPE, 2009
