= Enrico Ravetta =

Italian painter (1864–1939)

Enrico Ravetta (1864 in Milan – 1939) was an Italian painter, mainly of portraits.

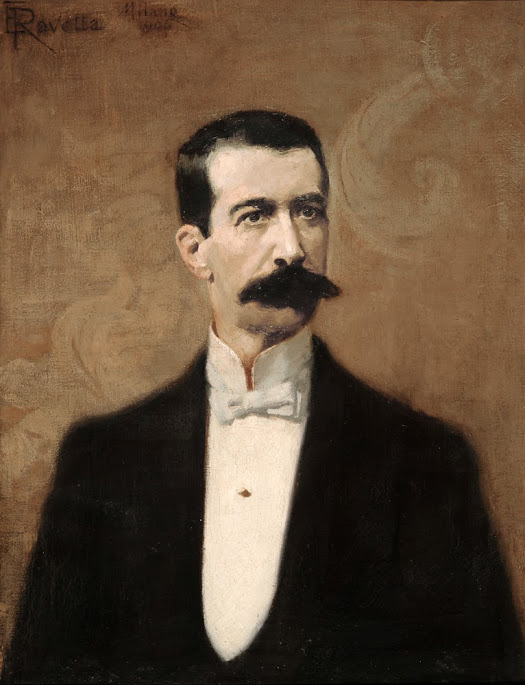
Portrait of Dr Borges de Medeiros in Museum of Porto Alegre, Brazil.

He was a resident of Milan. He studied at the Brera Academy under Raffaele Casnedi and Giuseppe Bertini. Among his portraits is one of Amilcare Ponchielli. His self-portrait is at the Galleria d'Arte Moderna, Milan.
