= Eugenio Spreafico =

Italian painter

Eugenio Spreafico (2 April 1856 in Monza – 7 January 1919 in Magreglio) was an Italian painter, mainly of landscapes and genre works.

== Biography ==
While he was born and resident in Monza, he trained at the Brera Academy in Milan, where he trained with Francesco Hayez and Giuseppe Bertini. He first exhibited at the Brera in 1880. His landscapes mainly depicted the Lombard countryside and the area around Magreglio in Lago di Como.

Among his works, he exhibited in 1881 at Milan: April; Pioggia di foglie autunnali; I fiori del Sagrestano; Tramonto; Bosco; and a genre canvas titled In processione,. In the same city, in 1883, he displayed: Quanto sa di sale, lo pane altrui; Benedizione delle case; Love in the Studio. In 1883 at Roma: Return to Cascina and In a Park of Monza. At the 1884 Exhibition of Fine Arts at Turin: Nozze paesane; L'Ave Maria del mattino; Saturday. In 1886, at Milan: In Cascina; Puerpera; Idyl; and Dal mercato. In 1887 at Venice: Gioie; Dolori; andLavoro. The painting Mamme contadine coi bimbi in collo in giorno di festa was exhibited at the Fumagalli of Milan. At the 1988 Exposition of Fine Arts of Bologna, he had two paintings illustrating verses of Dante: A fulgore et a Tempestate and Libera Nos Domine, also exhibited at Milan.

Angelo De Gubernatis was to say of him that:

His brush has an extraordinary sensibility of impressions, and responds, interprets with a surety of his guiding hand and mind: no uncertainty, no regrets, no fatigue ever reach: whether he wishes to render a feast of light, or allow penumbra to flood the landscape, Spreafico intends to make a canvas to express his feeling as felt, and the mark of the realism emerges always equally, always strong.

He also was known for his portraits. The Galleria d'Arte Moderna of Milan has nearly half a dozen of his works.

The painter Leonardo Spreafico (born 1907) is a direct descendant and pupil of Eugenio.
