= Pietro Marzorati =

Italian painter (1829–1895)

Pietro Marzorati (1829–1895) was an Italian painter, mainly painting land- and sea-scapes.

== Biography ==
He was born and died in Milan. He studied at the Brera Academy under professor Giuseppe Bisi and in 1852, he won a gold medal at the annual contest of the Accademia of Venice. In 1875, he won the second prize at the Internazional Exhibition of Santiago, Chile, and in 1876 he was made honorary associate of the Academy of Fine Arts of Milan.
