= Adolfo Feragutti Visconti =

Italian painter (1850–1924)

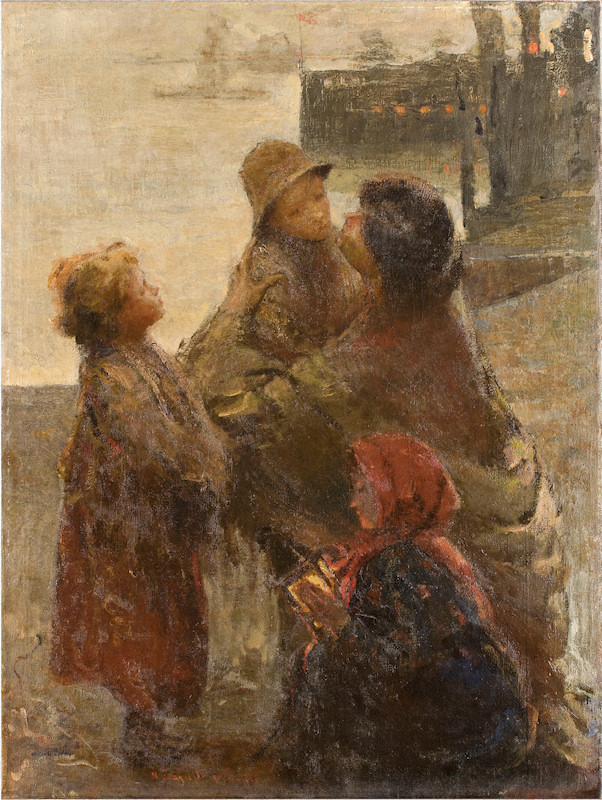
Ricordati della mamma, c. 1903 (Fondazione Cariplo)

Adolfo Feragutti Visconti (25 March 1850 – 10 March 1924) was an Italian Swiss painter, of eclectic styles and subjects, including orientalist themes, genre works, and landscapes.

== Biography ==
Visconti was born in Pura, Canton Ticino. Orphan of father by the age of 16, he enrolled at the Brera Academy of Fine Arts when he was 18, where he studied with Luigi Bisi, and made his debut in 1873 as a perspective painter. Attracted by the work of the Milanese Scapigliatura movement, he was one of the first members of the Famiglia Artistica Milanese. He completed his studies under the guidance of the history painter Stefano Ussi, which brought him into contact with the Tuscan art scene. On his return to Milan, he took part unfailingly in the major national exhibitions, attracting the attention of critics in 1881 with a work on a historical subject. It was in 1883 that he produced the first of his still lifes, which were to earn him a considerable reputation in the 1890s. A portrait of his in an outdoor setting won the prestigious Prince Umberto Prize in 1891, thus launching a renewal of the traditional approach to this genre through the influence of Cesare Tallone's work and the first photographic models. The period between 1907 and 1909 saw a stay in Patagonia, where the artist painted canvases capturing various aspects of the life of the indigenous population. His tree Works Testa di indio della Terra del Fuoco, I funghi, Tordi are in the permanent collection of the Pinacoteca Cantonale Giovanni Züst in Rancate, while two other works, Uva nera and Ritratto di donna, are at the Museo Cantonale d'Arte of Lugano.

== Other projects ==
Media related to Adolfo Feragutti Visconti at Wikimedia Commons
