= Carlo Jotti =

Italian painter (1826–1905)

Carlo Iotti or Carlo Jotti (March 29, 1826 – June 21, 1905 ) was an Italian painter, mainly of landscapes.

He was born in Milan, and resided there after completing his artistic training at the Brera Academy. Many of his works were exhibited in Milan, Turin, Venice and internationally in the various Expositions. He painted the snowy Alps, and its forests, lakes, and farmland; among his works are: Monte Rosa; Madonna del Monte; Varese; Pescarenico (Lecco); and Acquedotto. He painted much at Lago Maggiore, including: Isola Bella sul Lago Maggiore; Isola dei Pescatori; Santa Caterina del Sasso. He also liked to paint the countryside in Lazio, including Tempio di Minerva nella Campagna romana; Campagna a Porta Furba; Veduta degli Acquedotti romani. Other paintings of this artist are: Antica casa e Castello di Scipione a Salsomaggiore; Stazione del Tramvia a Villa Fornaci, Pagan temple and many landscape studies painted on site.
