= Contardo Barbieri =

20th-century Italian painter

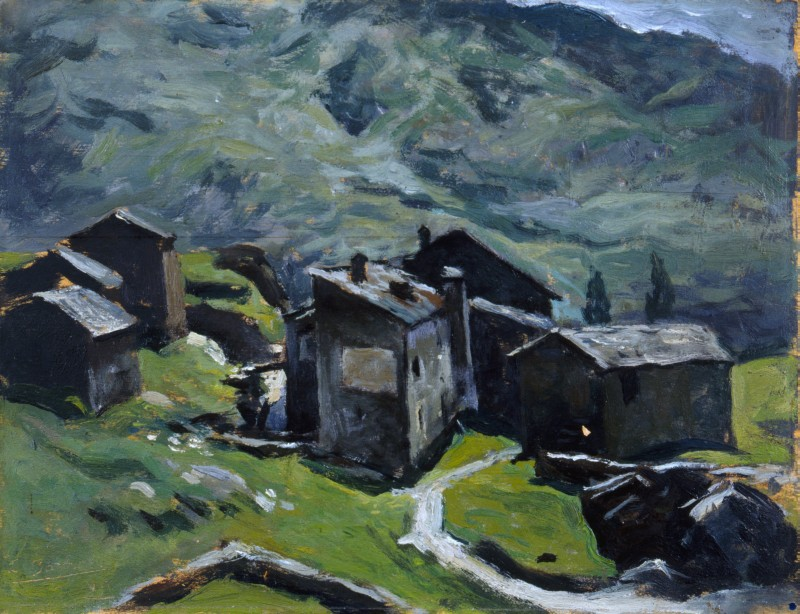
Baite di Caspoggio, 1929 (Art collections of Fondazione Cariplo)

Contardo Barbieri (26 November 1900 – 7 March 1966) was an Italian painter.

Barbieri was born in Broni, Pavia. He graduated from the Brera Academy in 1921 and in his youthful works he re-elaborated the late 19th-century Lombard figurative tradition, attracted by the researches into light and colour carried out by Emilio Gola, Daniele Ranzoni and Emilio Longoni. Without abandoning his realist style of painting, during the 1920s, he developed a more solid and synthetic rendering of form, influenced by the contemporary researches of the Novecento Italiano group, which he joined after the first Milan exhibition in 1926.

After his debut in the Esposizione Nazionale d’Arte, held at the Palazzo della Permanente in Milan in 1927, he began to exhibit regularly from 1928 onwards in the Venice Biennale and all the principal, official exhibitions in Italy and abroad. He gained extensive recognition through his vast repertoire of portraits, female figures and still lifes as well as his notable production of landscapes, in which he combines the severe language of the 20th century with studies from life. After being appointed director of the Carrara Academy in Bergamo in 1931, he played a pivotal role in the cultural renewal of the city and he executed a mural for the Casa Littoria "A. Locatelli" in 1938, which was later destroyed.

In the mid-1930s, he was a volunteer in east Africa. With the collapse of the Fascist ideology, Barbieri went into a deep artistic crisis that culminated in 1942, then he began a new phase in his painting, marked by a return to models and schemes deriving from the art of the past.

He died in Milan in 1966.
