= Angelo Trezzini =

Italian painter (1827–1904)

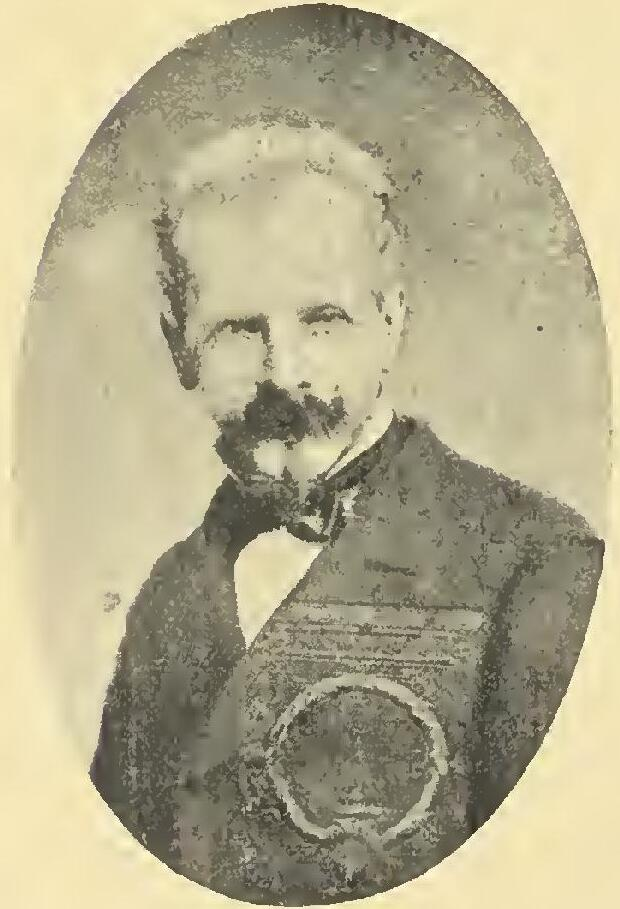
Angelo Trezzini

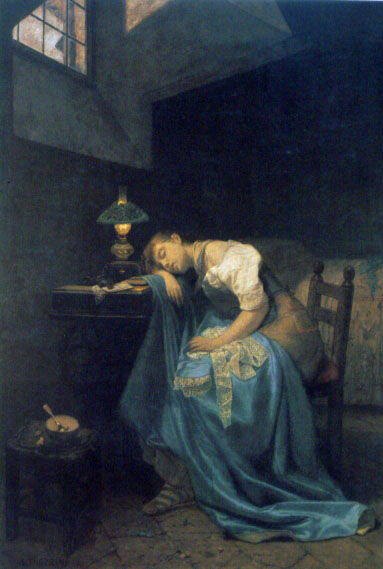
A Tired Seamstress

Angelo Trezzini (28 April 1827 in Milan – 27 May 1904 in Milan) was an Italian painter.

Enrolled at the Brera Academy of Fine Arts from 1844 to 1846, Trezzini served his pictorial apprenticeship in the studio of the Induno brothers, under the guidance of Domenico, his brother-in-law, and in close contact with Gerolamo, his comrade in arms in the First Italian War of Independence.

In order to escape the Austrian army during the riots in Milan (1848), he took refuge with his grandparents in Astano, Switzerland, where he welcomed the Indunos, who had also fled. In 1859, he fought with the Hunters of the Alps, led by Giuseppe Garibaldi. In 1861, he won the Mylius Prize for genre painting.

He then focused on military subjects and established himself as a painter of battle scenes in the 1860s. The following decade saw the introduction of anecdotal themes of a patriotic character, treated in a domestic and sentimental style, reflecting the models developed by the Induno brothers, the constant point of reference for all his work as a painter.

Trezzini obtained a teaching post at a professional training school for young women in Milan in 1876 and was commissioned by various charitable institutions to paint portraits of their benefactors. A lithographer and illustrator, he also drew satirical cartoons for humorous journals.
