= Virgilio Ripari =

Italian painter (1843–1902)

Virgilio Ripari (1843 – 11 April 1902) was an Italian painter, mainly depicting genre scenes of women and flowers. His style is described as a late Romantic, often depicting nuns and scene galanti (antique costume genre).

== Biography ==
Ripari was born in Bozzolo, but moved to Asola, Province of Mantua as an infant. He was born to a peasant family so financially constrained that they had to place him in an orphanage. Aided by local figures, the town of Asola granted him a stipend to attend the Brera Academy, where he won a number of medals. There he studied under Giuseppe Bertini and Raffaele Casnedi.

In 1866, he volunteered for the Italian armies under Garibaldi, and fought in the Tyrol. After the war, he displayed at the Exhibition una prima volta and two portraits painted al vero, and a larger than life canvas: Il bagno pompeiano (The Pompeian Bath). He resided in Milan as an adult. He painted a number of paintings in oil and watercolors for the Queen of the United Kingdom. In 1872 at the Exposition of Milan, he displayed: Passeggio nel giardino; Le rose; and a portrait. In 1883 at Milan, he exhibited: Buon giorno; I fiori for the sacra; Prima neve (First Snow); and Per l'onomastico of the padrona. In 1884 at the Exposition of Turin, he displayed Peccato e preghiera. Ripari sent to the 1886 Exhibition of Milan: Studio; Venditori di frutta; Pittrici moderne; Furto innocente. To the 1887 Exposition of Venice, Ripari sent: Prima of the Scuola; Fiori per tutti (Flowers for All). At the 1889 Exposition of Fine Arts in Milan, he displayed: Dalle valli al monte; Al fonte; Amenità; and Portrait of a young Girl. The Galleria d'Arte Moderna of Milan has a number of his works, including Alla finestra (At the Window) 1850; Il mese di Maria (1875); Il getto dei fiori (1850); Linda e Peo (1850); Peccato e preghiera (1882); Ricordi (1850); Il giorno (1850); Fiori (1850).

The contemporary critic Virgilio Colombo noted in Ripari the influence of Tranquillo Cremona, but with less iridescence and a more delicate brushstroke, and sharing more with Mosè Bianchi. Later in life he focused on painting portraits. A retrospective of his work and influences was held in 2018-2019 in Asola and titled VIRGILIO RIPARI. Un pittore a Milano nel secondo Ottocento.

He died in Milan on 11 April 1902.
