= Pompeo Borra =

Italian painter (1898–1973)

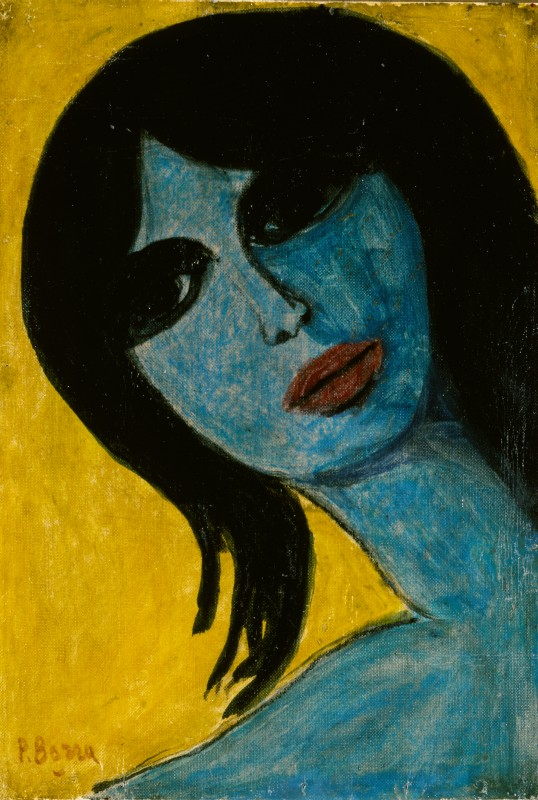
Face, 1972 (Art collections of Fondazione Cariplo)

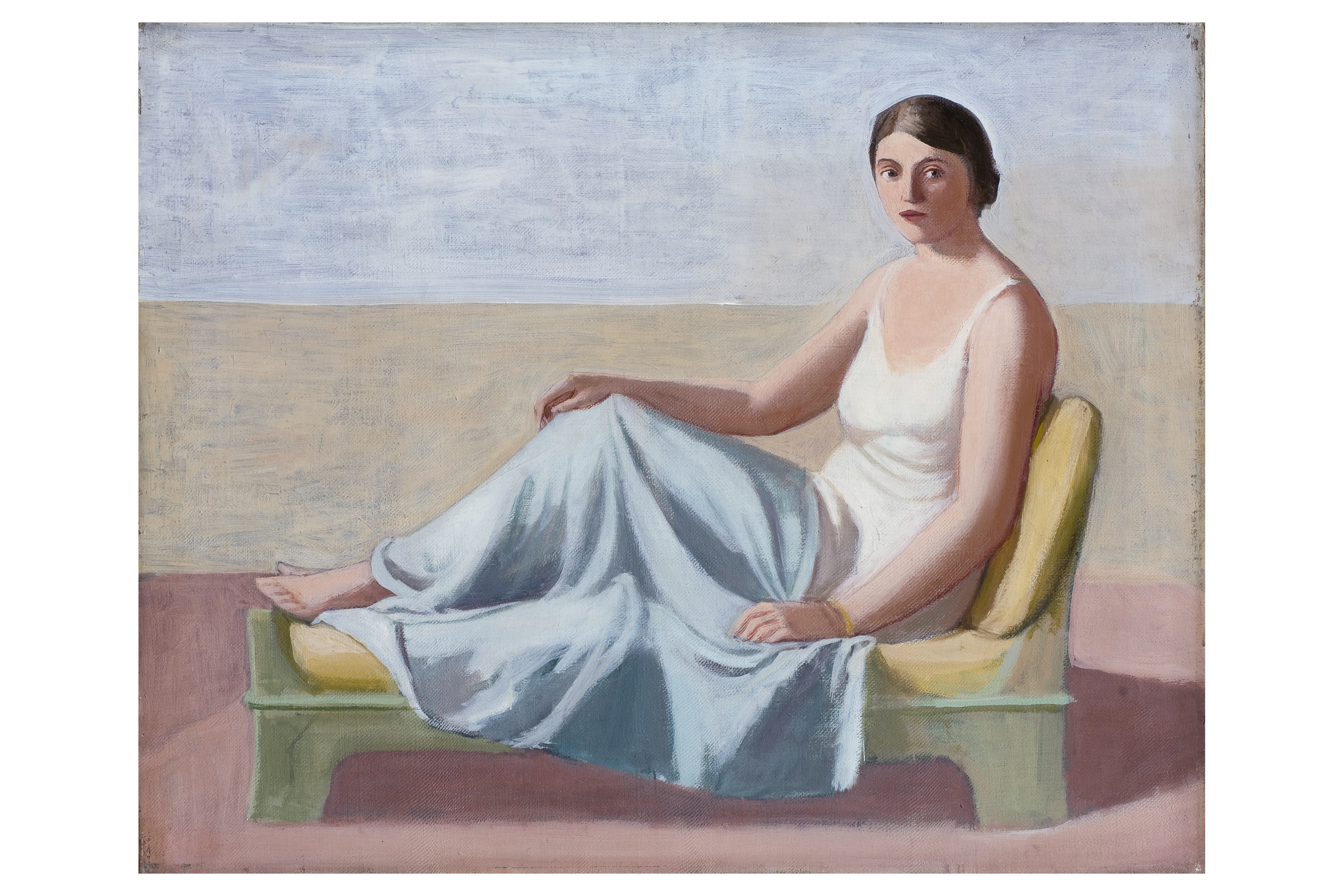
Figura femminile su dormeuse, 1930, Museo Civico di Modena

Pompeo Borra (1898 – 1973) was an Italian painter.

== Biography ==
Pompeo Borra was born in Milan His studies were varied: first he attended technical schools and then, briefly, the course in decoration at the Scuola degli Artefici at the Brera Academy. After fighting as a volunteer in World War I, he returned to Milan, where he made his debut at the Famiglia Artistica in 1920.

In 1924, he participated in the Esposizione Internazionale d’Arte in Venice arousing the critics’ interest with his severe language deriving from the Quattrocento characterised by solid volumes and suspended, unreal atmospheres. His archaic style drew him to the Novecento Italiano and from 1926 on he took part in all the group’s shows. In 1928, he showed works in the major exhibition of Italian art, curated by Franz Roh, the theorist of Magical Realism and German Neue Sachlichkeit.

During the 1930s, he renewed his pictorial language by adopting a lighter and more luminous range of colours, without, however, abandoning the solid volumes of his figures. With the paintings of this period, his reputation as an artist became firmly established and he won the Principe Umberto Prize in 1934.

Between 1936 and 1939, he made frequent stays in Paris where he came into contact with the art dealer Léonce Rosenberg, director of the gallery L’Effort Moderne and promoter of Pablo Picasso and Georges Braque. At this time his painting was influenced by contemporary researches on abstract art resulting in a limited number of geometric works. This was followed by a vast output in which the artist did not abandon figuration and painted mainly female portraits and landscapes. Different variations on these subjects were frequently produced throughout his mature period, which is distinguished by an intense research on colour, applied in broad flat fields using tones that deliberately clash, and on the simplification of the form within a two-dimensional space. He began teaching art in 1948, first at a secondary school and then at the Brera Academy, where he was appointed director in 1970.

He died in Milan in 1973.

== Bibliography ==
- Elena Lissoni, Pompeo Borra, online catalogue Artgate by Fondazione Cariplo, 2010, CC BY-SA (source for the first revision of this article).
