= Enrico Braga =

Italian sculptor

Enrico Braga (1841–1919) was an Italian-Swiss sculptor, active in Neoclassical and Romantic styles.

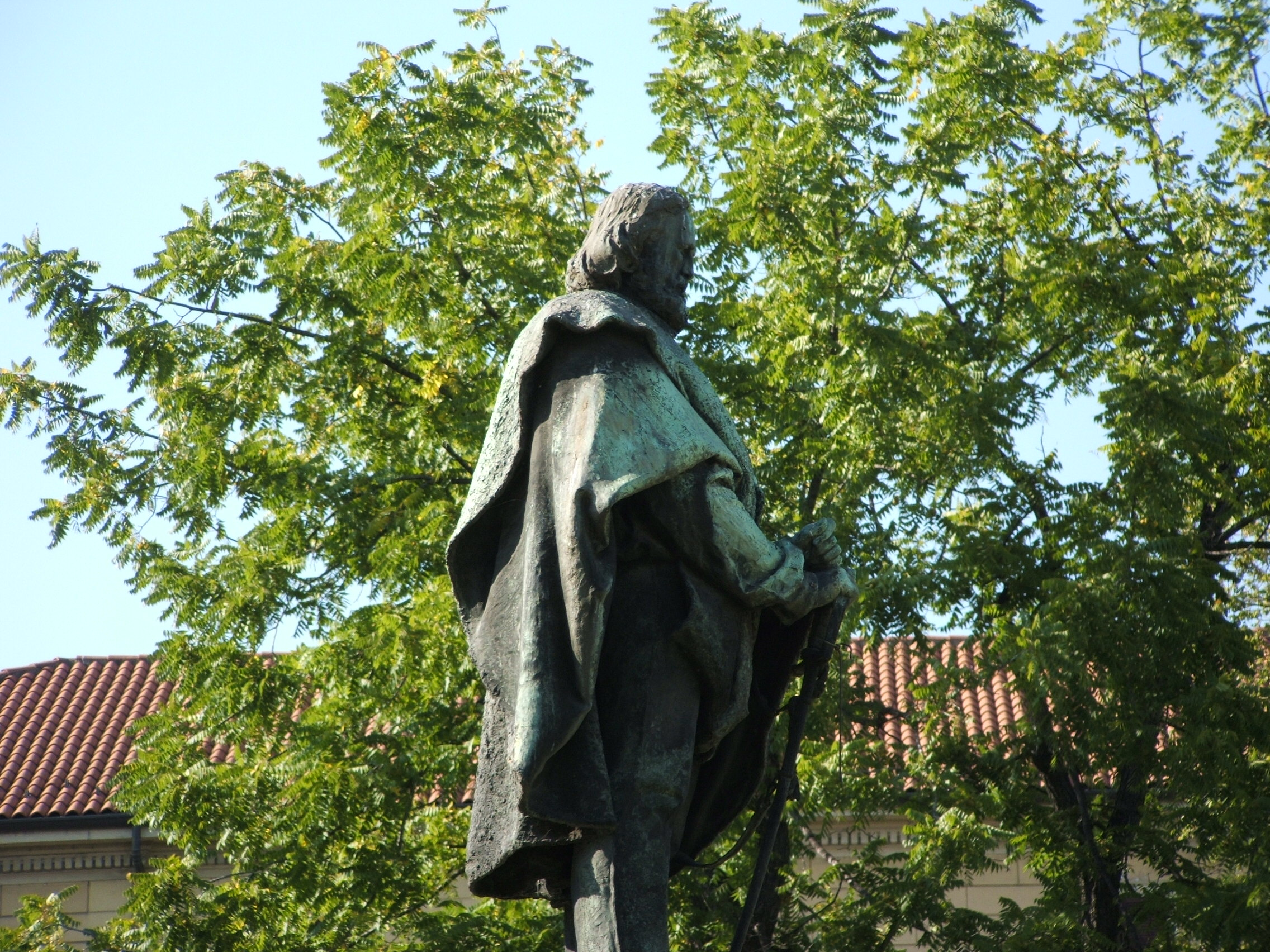
Monument to Garibaldi, Novara.

== Biography ==
He was born in Canton Ticino and studied in the Brera Academy. At the 1880 National Exposition of Fine Arts of Turin, he displayed a series of statues, including Rataplan; Per l'Onomastico; Il premio; and Cleopatra. At the 1883 Roman Exposition, he displayed two female statues: a Daughter of the Sea and La Rèverie. He also displayed a Bacchus, and a Garibaldi on July 25, 1866, and La Touriste. A monument to Garibaldi by Braga is standing in Novara. His Cleopatra and Bacchus were also exhibited in Paris in 1878. The former was also displayed at the 1876 Centennial Exposition in Philadelphia, Pennsylvania as part of the Egyptian Hall. The statue was felt to be the sculpted representation of a figure painted by Gérôme. he became an Associate member of the Royal Academy of Fine Arts in Milan and of St Petersburg, Russia.

== Sources ==
- Belyaev, N. S. (2018). Honorary Free Associates of the Imperial Academy of Arts. Brief biographical guide (PDF). St Petersburg: Russian Academy of Sciences. p. 42. ISBN 978-5-336-00234-8.
