= Giuseppe Modorati =

Italian painter (1827–1923)

Giuseppe Modorati (1827–1923) was an Italian painter.

He was a resident of Milan, and studied at the Brera Academy. He later served as custodian of the Museum galleries of the Brera. In that role, he often performed restorations.

He was prolific and eclectic, painting history, sacred, and genre subjects, as well as portraits. In 1880 at Turin, he exhibited: Christ at Gesthemane. In 1883 at Milan, he exhibited: The Garibaldini and the Bersaglieri of Manara defend the Breach of Rome in 1849, and a half-figure titled: Pensierosa. In 1886 at the National Exposition, he exhibited: Troppo tardi; Rifugio d'amore; Placido sonno, and Le sirene, a charcoal drawing.
