= Ambrogio Preda =

Italian painter (1839–1906)

Ambrogio Preda (Milan, 25 December 1839 - Davesco Soragno, Lugano, 5 June 1906) was an Italian painter, mainly of landscapes of the alpine mountains and valleys.

Born in Lombardy, he studied at the Brera Academy, and was a resident of Milan and Lugano. In 1860, he won a Mylius prize at the Brera Academy. He painted impressions of alpine landscapes including Ottobre, exhibited at Turin in 1884, Lago di Lugano, exhibited at Milan in 1881; Davesio exhibited at Turin in 1880; and a Veduta nella Svizzera Italiana exhibited at Milan, in 1872.
