= Sergio Calatroni =

Italian designer

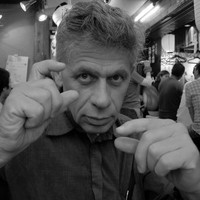
- Born: 1951 (age 74–75)

Sergio Maria Calatroni (born 1951) is an Italian artist living in Kamakura, Japan. Although he graduated from Accademia delle Belle Arti di Brera in set design, he is also known as an architect, industrial designer, interior designer, graphic artist, creative director, and journalist.

As an architect, he has worked all over the world. This is a short list of buildings he designed.

- Roux di Perfe, Osaka (1989), Japan
- N.O.Z. Building in Shizuoka, Japan (1992)
- Japanese Embassy in Damascus, Syria (2004),
- Yammine Center in Lebanon (2008)
- Galleria Etica in Shizuoka, Japan (2009)

As a fashion designer, he has organized shows and installations for Luciano Soprani, Gillette Italia, GFT and others.

As an Industrial designer he has created for Pallucco srl, Zeus, Barovier & Toso, Pozzi & Figli, Vilca, Sisal, Metals, Alessi, Glass Design, Nippon Alumi, Crassevig, Museo Alchimia, Memphis, Gabbianelli.
