= Giovanni Pessina =

Italian painter (1836–1904)

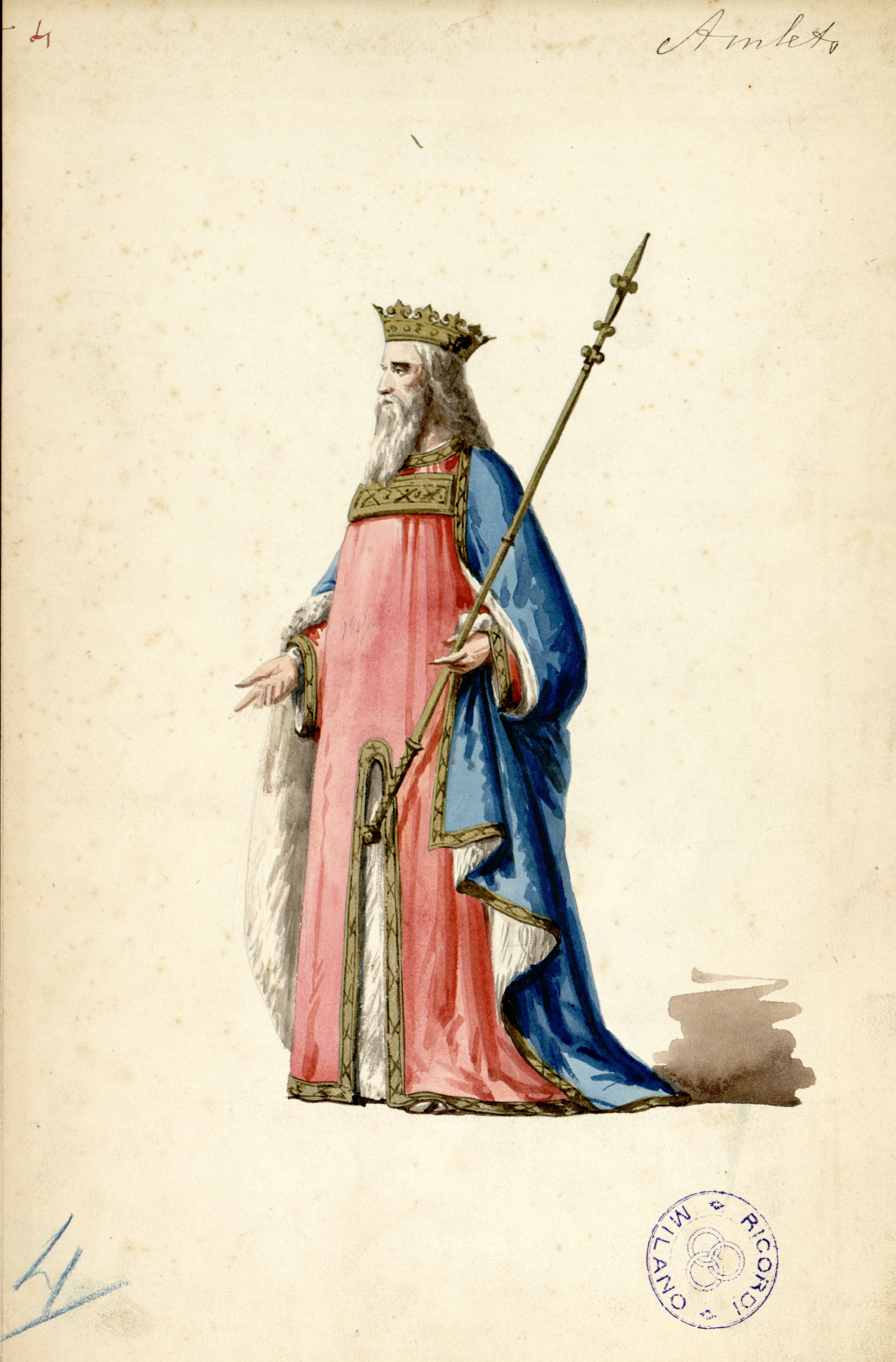
Re (baritone), model by Giovanni Pessina for Amleto (1871)

Giovanni Pessina (1836—1904) was an Italian painter. Described in contemporary documents as a painter of perspective and an internista (interior painter), he specialized in vedute of interiors in a precise, realist style.

== Biography ==
Pessina was born in Bergamo, Austrian Empire. He studied at the Brera Academy and was a pupil of Luigi Bisi.

In 1872, at Milan, he exhibited a canvas depicting Choir of the church of the Monastero Maggiore in Milan, and the interior of Sacristy of the church of San Vittore al Corso. At the Esposizione of Fine Arts at Turin, in 1880, he displayed the interior of the Abby of Chiaravalle. The Galleria d'Arte Moderna of Milan has two paintings by Pessina: Interno del Duomo di Milano (1862) and Interno della sagrestia di San Vittore Grande a Milano (1865). A painting of the 4 September 1864 ceremony awarding honorary membership in the Pio Istituto Tipografico of Milan to Alessandro Manzoni was located in said institute.
