= Ezechiele Trombetta =

Italian artist

Ezechiele Trombetta (September 13, 1834 in Como – 1903) was an Italian sculptor.

He was a resident in Como. He studied at the Brera Academy in Milan, and won some prizes. He exhibited La mèsse and Incitazione, at the Mostra Nazionale of Naples of 1877, and in 1880 to Milan, he sent a marble group titled: Good Morning, and two puttini: Titubante e Impermalito. The same group and one of two putti were exhibited again in 1881 in Milan. At the 1883 Mostra in Rome, he exhibited Da Galileo a Volta, a bronze group; and in Turin, the next year, a statue in marble, Scienza e Allegoria (Allegory of Volta's experiment) won a silver medal at the 1883-84 International Exhibition at Nizza. Other works del Trombetta are the thousands of graceful putti in all manner of expression. He often worked in clay. The Modern Art Gallery of Milan displays a relief titled Dante and Casella (1869) He completed the wooden statue of the title saint for the church of San Donnino in Como he completed the bust of Garibaldi for the Asilo Garibaldi in Como.
