= Giuseppe Solenghi =

Italian painter (1879–1944)

Giuseppe Solenghi (Milan, 1879 - Cernobbio (Province of Como), 1944) was an Italian painter, depicting mainly landscapes and cityscapes (vedute).

== Biography ==
From 1841 to 1867, he was a pupil at the Brera Academy, studying painting under Cesare Tallone, sculpture and engraving under Ernesto Bazzaro, and perspective under Giuseppe Mentessi. In 1895–1900, he dedicated himself to illuminated manuscripts. He began exhibiting his landscapes after the First World War. It is said that Leonardo Bazzaro influenced his choice of landscape and vedute. Rather than the sunlit pastoral views, he preferred to depict the humid panoramas of the canals of Milan and Venetian lagoons. He had a posthumous exhibition in the Galleria Boito of Milan, sponsored by the Fondazione Cariplo
