= Rinaldo Saporiti =

Italian painter (1840–1913)

Rinaldo Saporiti (1840–1913) was an Italian painter.

He was born in Milan into an aristocratic family, and studied at the Brera Academy in Milan, where among his mentors were Giuseppe Mazzola and Luigi Bisi. He was eclectic in his themes, which included both landscapes and figures, using both oils and watercolors. In 1861, he exhibited at the Brera: Mattino and Un mercato. In 1863, he exhibited some works based on a trip to Tunisia, including Una via a Tunisi; followed in 1867 by La Goletta-Laguna di Tunisi. He also exhibited subjects from Sardinia and Liguria. In 1870 at the Parmesan Mostra Italiana of Fine Arts, he submitted three paintings representing Caneto (Lake Maggiore); The Alps; Valle di Sitsa, and a fourth watercolor: Quassa (Lake Maggiore). Also at the Exposition of Turin, in 1880, were two paintings representing la Riviera di Genoa and The Adriatic. Four years later at the same Turin exhibition, he exhibited: Caccia nelle canne e la Pesca; and he exhibited once more, in 1886, at the Exhibition of Fine Arts in Milan.
