= Serafino Macchiati =

Italian painter (1861–1916)

Serafino Macchiati (17 January 1861, Camerino, Italy – 12 December 1916, Paris, France) was an Italian painter.

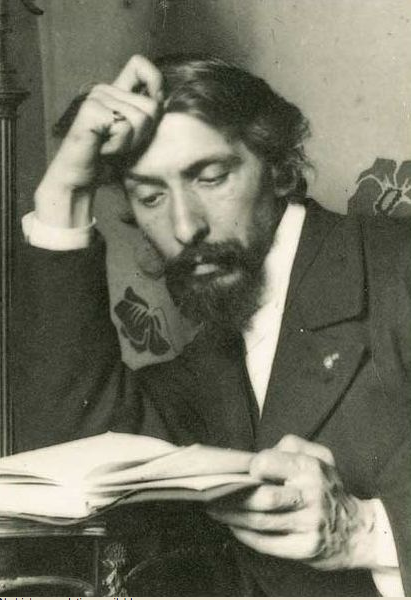
Serafino Macchiati portrait

== Biography ==
He first studied at the Accademia Clementina of Bologna, and in 1880 moved to Rome, where he was an illustrator for the journal “La Tribuna illustrata”. In 1898, the editor Lemerre invited him to Paris to illustrate the Romance series of Paul Bourget and other periodicals. Vittore Grubicy and Giacomo Balla also hosted him at Fontenay in 1900, where he painted divisionist impressions of Paris and its surroundings. He had an individual exhibition at the 1922 Venice Biennale.

Macchiati was knighted into the Order of the Crown of Italy. He illustrated an edition of Dante's Divine Comedy , and also painted two canvases on Spiritualist experiences, Le visionnaire and Scena spiritica.
