= Carlo Balestrini =

Italian painter (1868–1922)

Carlo Balestrini (March 24, 1868 – February 10, 1922) was an Italian painter. His best-known works are Impressionist landscapes with animals, especially horses.

== Biography ==
Born to a wealthy family in Albese near Milan, Carlo Balestrino studied at the Brera Academy under Giuseppe Bertini.

Among his works are: Cavallanti di ritorno; Paesaggio (1900, Milan mostra dell’Ottocento Lombardo); Abel (symbolist work which gained the premio Gavazzi prize at the 1897 Triennale of Milan); Portrait of Emilia Rizzi vedova Daccò; La calata della neve (1905, Biennale of Venice); Impressione invernale - Darsena di Milano (1906, National Exposition of Milan); Il “Porto di Milano” - Effetto di neve (1914, Biennale of Venice); Le slitte (1908, Brera); Stalla di vacche alla fattoria (1910, National Exposition of Milan). Balestrini also painted for the parish church of Santo Redentore and San Francesco of Cortenuova.

The author Erminia Mimma Viganò has published a novel titled Note nell’aria, whose protagonist's life intersects with that of the painter.
