= Alberto Malaspina (painter) =

Italian painter

Alberto Malaspina (1853 – 1903) was an Italian painter, depicting landscapes and seascapes.

== Biography ==
He was born in Pisa and died in Milan. In 1884 at Milan, he exhibited: Bogliasco, nella riviera di Levante, and Nervi.

His paintings Un mercante di cose mitiche (1875) and After the questua (1873) were awarded medals at the exhibitions of Toledo and Vienna respectively. To the Paris Salons of 1876 and 1878, he exhibited a watercolor: The Baptism and Before the baptism, in the island of Ischia. His Lo Porta del Popolo was exhibited in Munich, where it was decorated with the Order of first class of San Michele. In 1877, he won a medal worth 1000 lire at Naples, for the painting After the Benediction. At the first Exposition of Rome of 1883, he displayed the canvas: Flight of Pope Eugenius IV. Also he displayed two small canvases: Lo scrivano pubblico and Pastime in Garden (1887), were acquired by the National Gallery of Budapest. He also made many portraits. He was also illustrator for journals. He was also a knighted into the Order of the Crown of Italy in 1876, honorary member of the Society of Water Color Artists of Brussels, Aix, and Rome; and Professor corrispondente of various academies.

In 1873 he left the military and moved to Milan, where he frequented the cultural salons. After 1880, encouraged by Emile Gola he specialized in marine landscapes.

Albert Malaspina also refers to a 13th-century troubadour.
