= Federico Quarenghi =

Italian painter (1858–1940)

Federico Quarenghi or Federigo Quarenghi (Milan, November 24, 1858 - Milan, 1940) was an Italian painter.

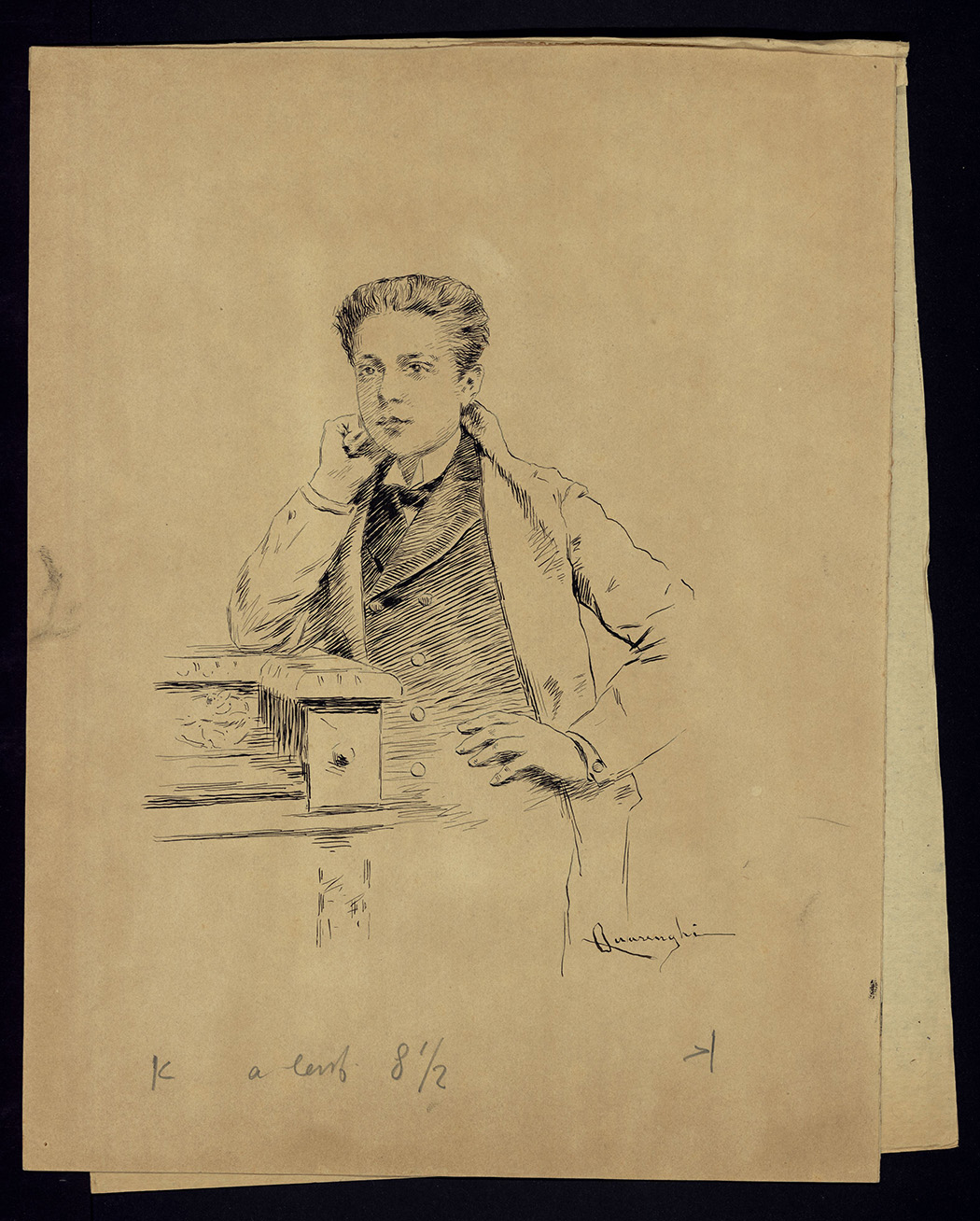
Portrait of a young man by Federico Quarenghi

== Biography ==
He studied at the Brera Academy under Giuseppe Bertini. His style was influenced by Tranquillo Cremona, and was mainly known for his elegant portraits. He exhibited commonly at the Brera, and among his paintings are portraits of Giacobbe Colombo and of the painter Attilio Pusterla.
