= Achille =

Achille (French: [a.ʃil], Italian: [aˈkil.le]) is a French and Italian masculine given name, derived from the Greek mythological hero Achilles. It may refer to:

== People ==
=== Artists ===
- Achille Beltrame (1871–1945), Italian painter
- Achille Calici (c. 1565–?), Italian painter
- Achille Castiglioni (1918–2002), Italian designer
- Achille Cattaneo (1872–1931), Italian painter
- Achille Devéria (1800–1857), French painter and lithographer
- Achille Duchêne (1866–1947), French garden designer
- Achille Empéraire (1829–1898), French painter
- Achille Formis (1832–1906), Italian painter
- Achille Funi (1890–1972), Italian painter
- Achille Glisenti (1848–1906), Italian painter
- Achille Granchi-Taylor (1857–1921), French painter and illustrator
- Achille Lega (1899–1934), Italian painter
- Achille Leonardi (c. 1800–1870), Italian painter
- Achille Locatelli (painter) (1864–1948), Italian painter
- Achille Mauzan (1883–1952), French illustrator, painter and sculptor
- Achille Etna Michallon (1796–1822), French painter
- Achille Mollica (1832–1885), Italian painter
- Achille Peretti (artist) (1857–1923), Italian painter, sculptor and anarchist
- Achille Petrocelli (1861/62–1896), Italian painter
- Achille Pinelli (1809–1841), Italian painter
- Achille Solari (1835–1884), Italian painter
- Achille Valois (1785–1862), French designer and sculptor
- Achille Vertunni (1826–1897), Italian painter
- Achille Vianelli (1803–1894), Italian painter
- Achille Zo (1826–1901), French painter

=== Musicians, composers and singers ===
- Achille Baquet (1885–1955/1956), American jazz clarinetist and saxophonist
- Achille De Bassini (1819–1881), Italian baritone
- Achille Campisiano (1837–1908), French pianist and composer
- Achille Mouebo (1971–2025), Congolese singer-songwriter
- Achille Rivarde (1865–1940), American-born British violinist and teacher
- Achille Simonetti (1857–1928), Italian violinist and composer
- Achille-Claude Debussy (1862–1918), French impressionistic composer and pianist

=== Politicians ===
- Achille Le Tonnelier de Breteuil (1781–1864), French politician
- Achille Casanova (1941–2016), Swiss journalist and politician
- Achille Corona (1914–1979), Italian socialist politician, lawyer and journalist
- Achille Joseph Delamare (1790–1873), French senator
- Achille Larue (1849–1922), Canadian lawyer and politician
- Achille Mapelli (1840-1894), Italian politician and journalist
- Achille Enoc Mariano (1933–2025), Italian politician
- Achille Occhetto (born 1936), Italian politician
- Achille Peretti (1911–1983), French politician
- Achille Serra (politician) (born 1941), Italian politician
- Achille Starace (1889–1945), Italian fascist leader before and during World War II
- Achille Totaro (born 1965), Italian politician

=== Religious figures ===
- Achille Grassi (1456–1523), Italian Roman Catholic bishop and cardinal
- Achille Gagliardi (1537–1607), Italian ascetic writer and Jesuit
- Achille Glorieux (1910–1999), French Catholic prelate, archbishop and diplomat
- Achille Harlay de Sancy (1581–1646), French diplomat, linguist, orientalist and Catholic bishop
- Achille Liénart (1884–1973), French Roman Catholic cardinal and bishop
- Achille Ratti (1857–1939), Italian Roman Catholic bishop and cardinal, later Pope Pius XI
- Achille d'Étampes de Valençay (1593–1646), French military leader, a Knight of Malta and Catholic cardinal

=== Scientists and mathematicians ===
- Achille Allier (1807–1836), French archaeologist, writer and art critic
- Achille Costa (1823–1899), Italian entomologist
- Achille Ernest Oscar Joseph Delesse (1817–1881), French geologist and mineralogist
- Achille Pierre Dionis du Séjour (1734–1794), French astronomer and mathematician
- Achille Marie Gaston Floquet (1847–1920), French mathematician
- Achille Gerste (1854–1920), Belgian Catholic priest, Jesuit, philologist and linguist
- Achille Griffini (1870–1932), Italian zoologist and high school teacher
- Achille Guenée (1809–1880), French entomologist and lawyer
- Achille Loria (1857–1943), Italian Jewish political economist and sociologist
- A. E. Meeussen (1912–1978), Belgian philologist
- Achille Müntz (1846–1917), French agricultural chemist
- Achille Ouy (1889–1959), French philosopher and sociologist
- Achille Urbain (1884–1957), French biologist
- Achille Valenciennes (1794–1865), French zoologist

=== Sportsmen ===
- Achille Anani (born 1994), Ivorian footballer playing in France
- Achille Colas (1874–1954), French road racing cyclist
- Achille Campion (born 1990), French footballer
- Achille Compagnoni (1914–2009), Italian mountaineer and skier
- Achille Coser (born 1982), Italian football goalkeeper
- Achille Emaná (born 1982), Cameroonian footballer
- Achille Fould (bobsleigh) (1919–1949), French bobsledder
- Achille Varzi (1904–1948), Italian Grand Prix race car driver

=== Other ===
- Achille Ballière (1840–1905), French architect
- Achille Boitel (died 1944), French businessman and Nazi collaborator
- Achille Jubinal (1810–1875), French medievalist
- Achille Leclère (1785–1853), French architect and teacher of architecture
- Achille Majeroni (1881–1964), Italian film actor
- Achille Maramotti (1927–2005), Italian fashion designer and founder of Max Mara, an Italian fashion company
- Achille Marozzo (1484–1553), Italian fencing master
- Achille Mbembe (born 1957), Cameroonian philosopher and political theorist
- Achille Millien (1838–1927), French poet and folklorist
- Achille Millo, stage name of Italian actor, voice actor and stage director Achille Scognamillo (1922–2006)
- Prince Achille Murat (1801–1847), eldest son of Joachim Murat
- Achille St. Onge (1913–1978), American publisher of miniature books
- Achille Vogliano (1881–1953), Italian classical scholar, archaeologist and papyrologist
- Achille Zavatta (1915–1993), French clown, artist and circus operator

== Fictional characters ==
- Achille Poirot, the "brother" of Agatha Christie's detective Hercule Poirot (actually Hercule in disguise) in the novel The Big Four
- the title character of Achille Talon, a comic book series
- the title character of Achille in Sciro, a 1737 opera
- Rodrigue Achille Fraldarius, a character in Fire Emblem: Three Houses

== See also ==
- Achilles (disambiguation)
