= Birkwood Castle =

Country house in Lanarkshire, Scotland

Coordinates: 55.633°N 3.889°W

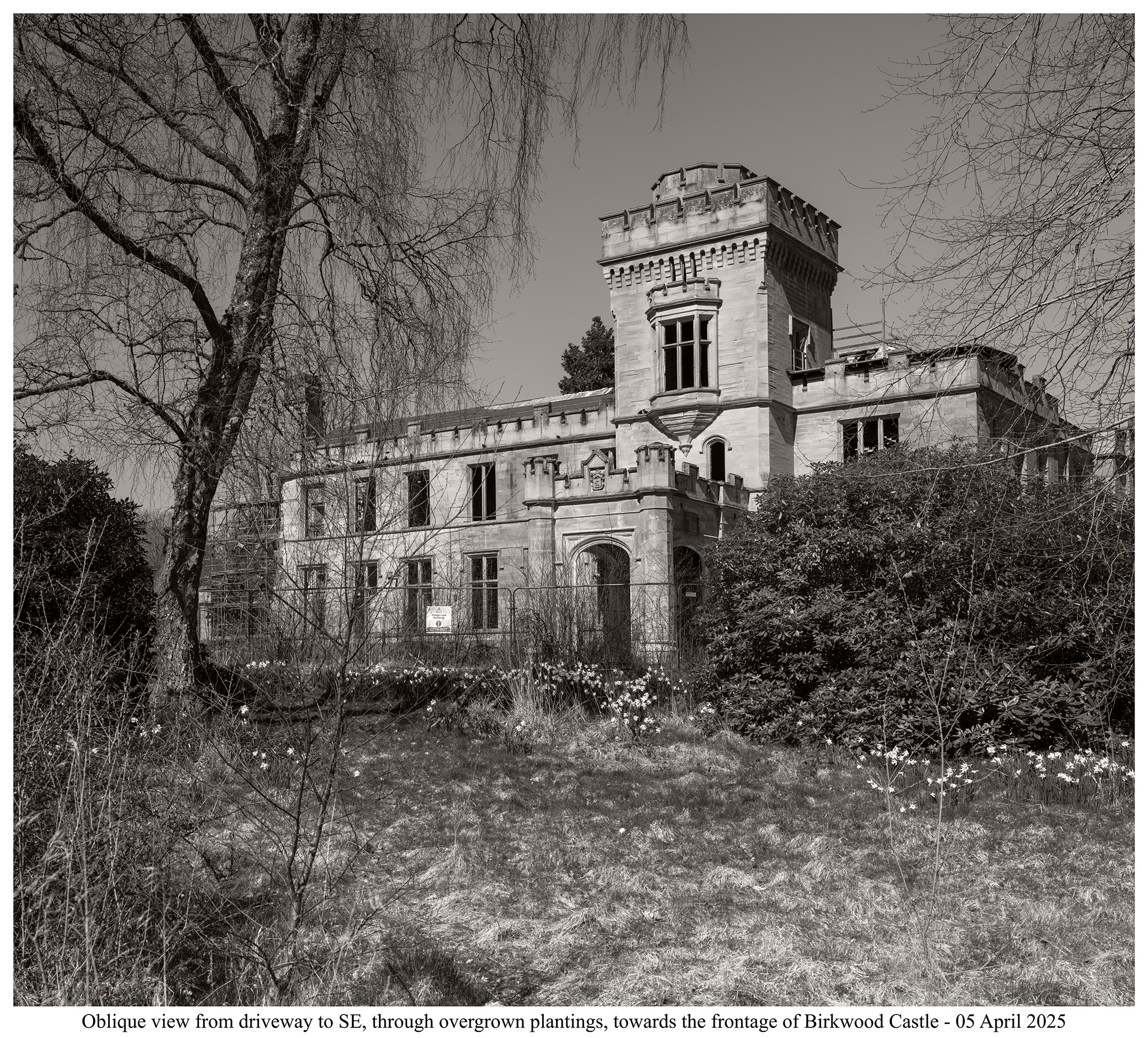
- Oblique view N from driveway to SE, through overgrown plantings towards frontage of Birkwood Castle - 05 April 2025

- Location within South Lanarkshire
- Former names: Murthirgill
- Alternative names: Birkwood House

General information
- Architectural style: Castellated Gothic Revival architecture
- Location: Greenholm, Lesmahagow, South Lanarkshire, Scotland
- Construction started: late-18th-century, or 1810
- Completed: 1890
- Demolished: Partly (consolidation) in 2015

Design and construction
- Architect: John Baird primus (mid-1850s) James Thomson (1890)

Birkwood Castle, also known as Birkwood House, is a castellated Gothic Revival country house situated in the Greenholm village area of Lesmahagow, South Lanarkshire, Scotland. Built originally as a small Georgian manor, it was greatly expanded by the McKirdy family in the mid-1800s and later 1800s to create the better known 'Birkwood Castle'. In 1923 the building and its policy grounds were purchased by a department of the local authority for use as a hospital. Following closure of the institution, attempts have been made to redevelop the building. The house, now in ruin, is on the Buildings at Risk Register, and is the subject of numerous, recent ghostlore associations.

== Origins and construction history ==
The first house called Birkwood on the present site is a Georgian villa traditionally believed to have been built in the late 18th century, and this element now forms the northern wing of the later extended house. However, later accounts from the house's proprietors and its architect, written in the year 1890, make clear reference to the first house on-site dating to 1810 instead. (Note: It is unclear whether the 1810 structure reflects an addition to an older house or instead refers to the Georgian House itself, whose ruins are still in-situ.)

The name Birkwood already applied historically to farming divisions of a large older estate, broadly comprehending an upper (High) and lower (Nether) Birkwood - apparently named after their associated birch woodlands along the Nethan Water in these climes. This estate formed a pendicle of the wider estate of Blackwood. The lower portion of the Birkwood estate was the earlier seat of the estate, with a mansion and an older still 'Castlehill' that marked a previous fortification site. This estate was long held by the Weirs of Birkwood. Eventually, the lower portion was sold to a James Tod Esquire, whereas Upper Birkwood came into the hands of the McKirdy family. The Upper portion centred on the property of Old Birkwood and its attendant Birkwood Mains, which stood west of the present policies. The older Roy Military Map, of mid-18th century date, also identifies a small property called Birkwood on the eastern bank of the Nethan Water, approximately east of the present Birkwood policies.

The present Birkwood mansion was built on or near the site of the earlier habitation of Mirthirgill (various spellings), whose name translates as the 'murder gill'; a gill being a term for a small stream that flows through a steep sided ravine. The gill in question appears to be the now unnamed burn which flows past the western side of the mansion. The lands of the Birkwood policies anciently comprised church lands attached to Lesmahagow Priory. The property came into the possession of the McKirdy/Mackirdy family around the late-1700s.

In connection with the Georgian house, it is recorded that on 22 February 1813, strong winds ripped off a lead platform which measured 11 x 42 feet, and weighed some 2,500 lbs. It perhaps formed a part of the roofing and was carried 130 feet away from the house. Several window panes were also broken by the winds.

Birkwood was greatly expanded in a castellated form of the Gothic Revival style in the period 1856-1859; incorporating some 'tenemental' and Tudor Revival elements linked to that style. This extension was designed by John Baird I, also known as John Baird primus.

Explicit newspaper coverage and visible datestones corroborate 1856 as the year of the original extension's commencement and 1857 as the year of its apparent completion, and this would seem to imply that more recent sources stating 1858 could be mistaken. The same may be said for sources such as McLeish's essay, which asserts 1856 as the date of completion - possibly reckoned on the datestone marked 1856 which, in fact, nods to the year of commencement. However, and somewhat paradoxically, a grand event was held in April 1859 to mark 'the completion of Birkwood House'. This event consisted of a sumptuous dinner for upwards of one hundred people, laid out in the house's lower corridor. Various festivities also took place at the event, including group singing of chosen songs, a ballroom dance that lasted into the early hours, and tables loaded with every delicacy that could be obtained, to the extent they groaned beneath their load.

The conflicting dates offered for the house's construction may be reconcilable if Birkwood represented a closely phased two-stage extension, with structural completion dates in 1857 and 1858, and fitting and décor finalisation in 1859. Indeed, an event in September 1857 noted that the new mansion house of Birkwood had been thrown open for a visit by the Lesmahagow Band of Hope. Then, in August 1858, 800 people embarked on a procession which took in the 'magnificant mansion of Birkwood', all the while being watched from its balcony by the proprietors Mr and Mrs McKirdy.

The chronicle of the dinner celebration in April 1859 records that the main contractor for the masonry work was a Mr Summers, a builder based in Hamilton. The foreman involved in the execution of this 1850s building work was a Mr Alexander Hamilton. The joinery work in the mansion appears to have been undertaken by a Mr Hamilton of Lanark, whose foreman for the project was a Mr William Gibson. The painter of the rooms was a Mr Bowie of Glasgow, whose foreman was a Mr Walker.

Reflecting on the construction of the mansion, the Rev. Dr McNaughton said the following at the same dinner event, he:

"alluded to the splendid building which had been erected at great cost; take it in view from every approach to the village, it has a most commanding appearance--its castellated towers appearing above the beautiful old trees, like those we read of in ancient times ..."

He believed there was nothing to compare it with in the Upper Ward of Lanarkshire.

A focal point of the mid-1850s extension is its square-block tower surmounted by an octagonal 'bell tower' on its western side. This tower was struck by lightning during a violent thunderstorm which occurred on 12 August 1884. This incident caused 'considerable damage'.

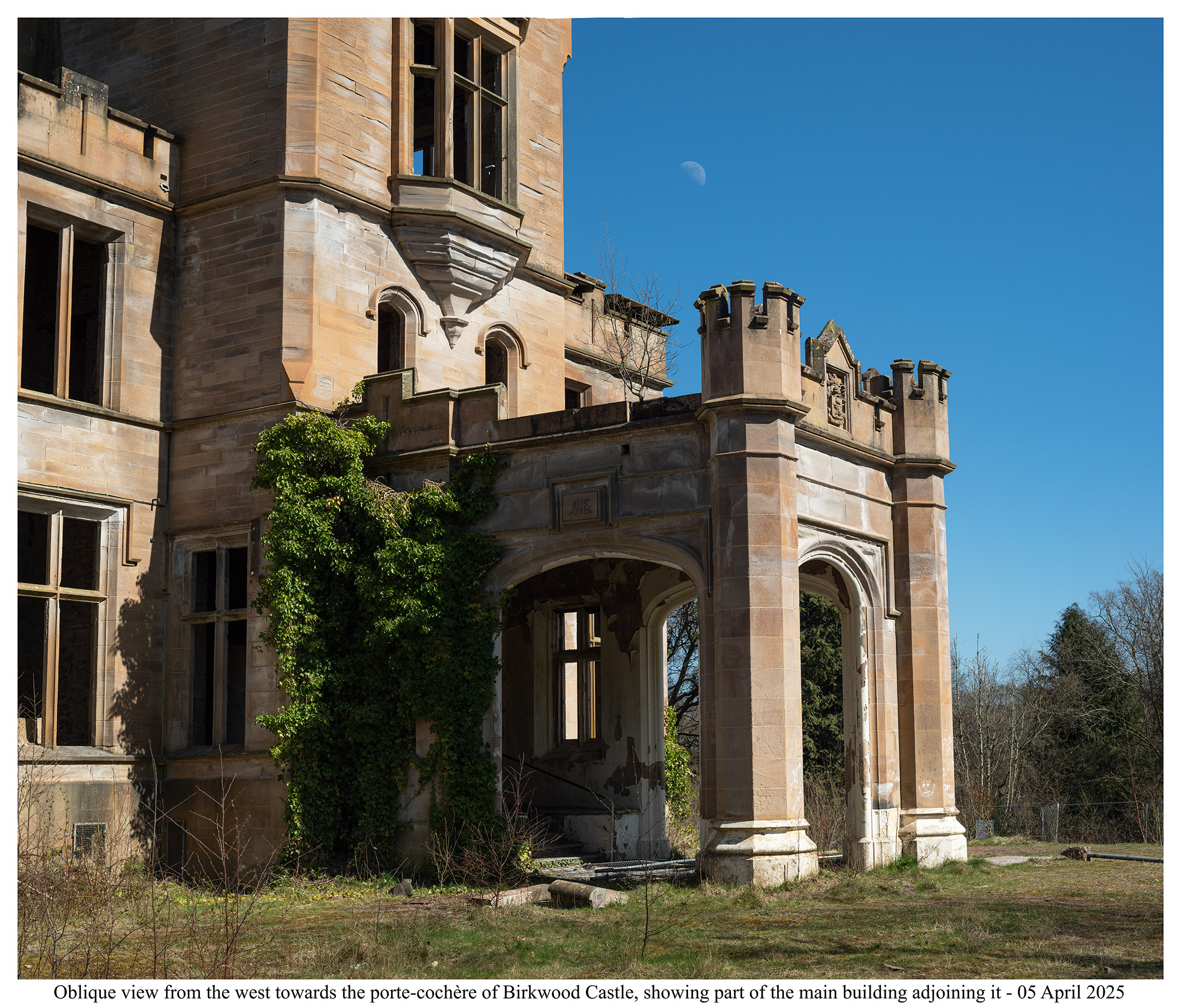
Oblique view from the west towards the porte-cochère of Birkwood Castle, showing part of the main building adjoining it - 05 April 2025

== Later extension ==
The mansion was again extended in a matching style in the early 1890s when the architect James Thomson of Glasgow designed a large west wing. This involved some remodelling of the frontage and entrance area of the mid-1850s work. James Thomson was a partner of the late architect behind the first extension. The ceremony for laying the foundation stone for the newer extension took place on Tuesday, 08 July 1890, with the architect, clerk of works, and various contractors all present. During this event, Mr James Thomson, the architect responsible, delivered a speech in which he provided a historical sketch of the mansion's development; stating that the oldest part of the house was built in 1810 on the instruction of the late John McKirdy. The late John Gregory McKirdy then instructed John Baird to undertake designs for the extension in 1856. The construction of the latter mostly occupied the years 1856-1857. Mr Thomson also communicated that his own extension, begun then in 1890, was commissioned from him by General McKirdy in 1889. This newer extension, once completed, had its own octagonal tower which rose to around 30 feet higher than its similar predecessor.

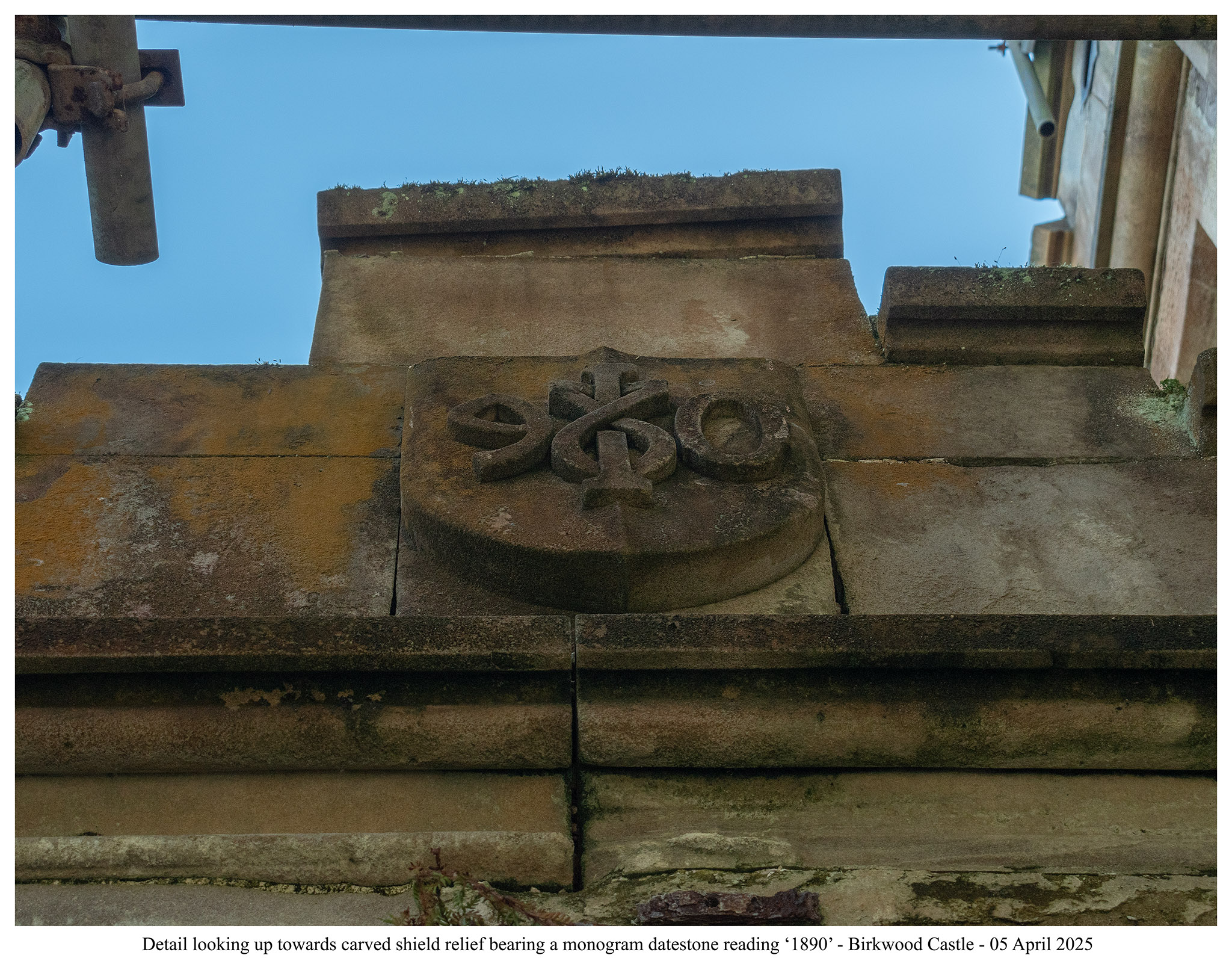
Detail looking up towards carved shield relief bearing a monogram datestone reading ‘1890’ - Birkwood Castle - 05 April 2025

== Architectural contentions ==
Although the architectural style of the building has been generally classified as Gothic Revival, this idea has been challenged, especially in regard to John Baird primus not being associated with such work, while his main aesthetic interests inspired Jacobethan and Tudor Revival trends instead. It has been recently argued that Birkwood represents an interesting Castellated transition style that occupies a space between late Romantic trends and early Victorian eclectic taste, but where the dominant structure is plainly vernacular and quite tenemental in form. The interesting fusion of architectural elements has also been put forward as a contributing factor towards the haunting aesthetic of the building:

"... Whatever the case, the reason the building is probably so intriguing if not unsettling, is because it takes an austere Neoclassical borrowing (the tenemental element) and marries it with a High Romantic form of Neo-Gothic. Whether to the trained eye or not, the overall effect is arguably insidious. It is akin to a mask of vanity concealing something much more austere, possibly even threatening. The great scale does the rest. So the sense of 'spookiness' is perhaps a semi-conscious perception of this incongruity. It is haunted by its contradictions."

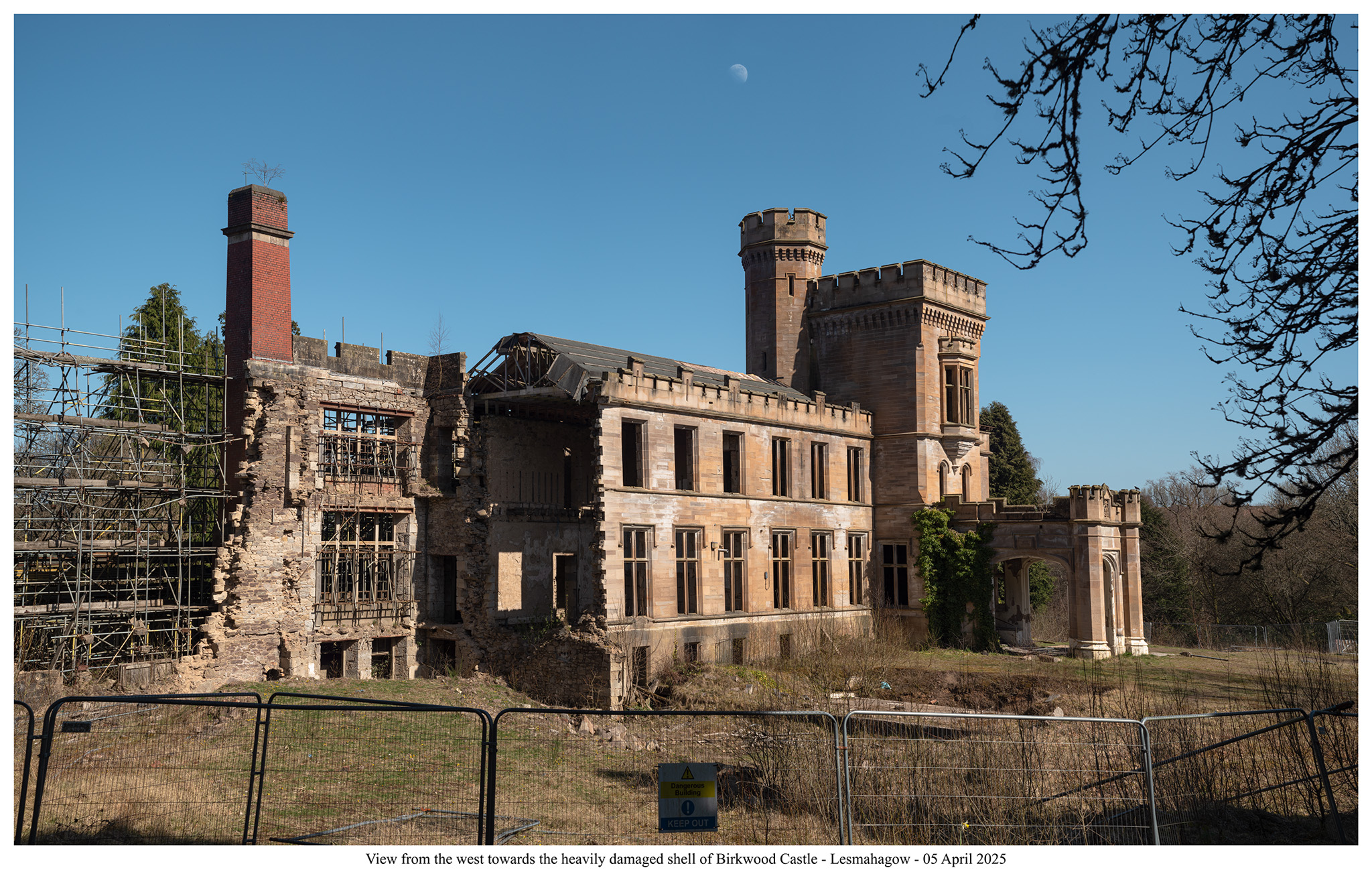
The heavily ruined shell of Birkwood Castle, viewed from the west. 05 April 2025. C. Ladds

== Sale ventures ==
In 1920 the house was marketed by the Mackirdy family using the agent Messrs Castiglione & Scott. At that time the estate with its mansion and policy grounds, extended to 1,124 acres, 673 of which were classed as agricultural land, grass parks, woodland and policies, and 451 acres as 'grouse moor'. The estate included four farms and various cottages as well. The sale was finalised to take place in Glasgow in late September 1920, with a revised acreage of 1,115 acres. The estate stretched westwards towards Blackhill, inclusive of the Tower of Beacon Woods. It extended south of the St. Brides burn and included the historic dwelling of Monkstable - associated with the sumpter horse and mule accommodation of the medieval monks of Lesmahagow Priory. The policies at that time included a walled garden, curling pond, and a tennis court.

In early October 1920, it was reported that no bidding interest was shown for the mansion or estate as a whole, but some of its farms and small cottages were sold as individual lots. Thereafter, Captain Elliot Mackirdy instructed the same agents to try and sell the remaining lots, and some coverage at the time promoted the house and policies as being ideally suited for the establishment of a residential school, a convalescent home, or a hydropathic institution. By mid December 1920, much of the estate had been sold, but the mansion, estate offices and policies, all extending to around 129 acres, still remained unsold. The Auchtykirnal grass parks measuring 129 acres also remained unsold. The mansion remained unsold throughout January 1921 when its marketing material also suggested it would be suited for use as a hotel or sanatorium.

Many months went by with little serious interest shown, and in the meantime, Captain MacKirdy instructed the auction house Wylie & Lochhead Ltd to sell the extensive and opulent contents of the mansion. This two-day sale took place within the mansion itself, on the days of Wednesday 02, and Thursday 03 November, 1921. The lots, which provide a detailed impression of the historic interior, numbered over 1,060 and included the following:

Paintings in oil and watercolour by the artists Horatio McCulloch, James Docharty, Joseph Noel Paton, Gourlay Steell, James Cole, Andrew Brown Donaldson, James Coutts Michie, James Francis Danby, James May, Alexander Miller, Alexander Green, D. Alexander, Tintoretto, Luca Giordano, G. Rossano, Emanuele Mollica, Onorio Marinari, Andrea Solari, Fausto Giusto, Enrico Sartori, Guido Reni, Nicolo Nemiri, August Le Gras, and Philip Duval. In addition to these paintings were sold numerous smaller works in the form of engravings, prints and photogravures.

Other lots included crystal items; fine China; Electro-plated items; carpets; rugs; hangings; and approximately 1,000 books. The furniture included a massive carved oak sideboard with assistant sideboard; a heavy oak extending dining table of 16 feet length; a set of twelve oak dining chairs in Morocco finish; an 'expensive' 13-piece carved mahogany dining room suite finished in green Morocco; a Capital three-piece suite in green Morocco; a substantial 9-piece oak library suite finished in crimson stamped velvet; a 'massive' pair of covered Sevres vases with painted panels and ormolu mounts; three marble-topped gilt console tables surmounted by 'handsome' pier glasses; upright Georgian wall-glass with black and gold mounts and a gilt frame; numerous mantel clocks in gilt and marble cases; three antique mahogany barometers with inlaid cases; several carved marble busts set on pedestals; a 50-inch inlaid Coromandel table on tapered legs; a 10-piece Capital carved rosewood suite finished in crimson Utrecht velvet; a gilt Louis XV open-armed occasional chair finished in a modern Beauvais tapestry; a nine-piece Capital walnut lounge suite finished in crimson floral damask; an 'expensive' full-size billiard table in mahogany frame, made by Hopkins & Stephens of London; various bedsteads and bedroom furniture in ash, mahogany, etc., and associated bedding materials; a five-foot hall cabinet with carvings of 'old oak figures' and panels applied and enclosed by five doors; a Burmese gong; three large oak palm stands; the full plenishings of the estate offices and outbuildings in the grounds; a large assortment of toys and games; a number of military uniforms; a hammerless sporting gun made by J. D. Dougall & Sons of Glasgow; a hammer gun by Allan of Glasgow; and various other smaller items, including saddles and other horse-riding equipment.

Also included was a notable set of ten 17th century painted Flemish glass window panels, the associated story of which read, that they were earlier purchased at Soleure from a Jew who had become possessed of them following the destruction by fire of the church at Coire Grisons, in which they had formed portions of the painted windows.

In addition to the household and office contents, various items related to the management of the estate and policies were also offered for sale, including wood waggons; draining, fencing and quarrying tools; liquid manure tanks; pheasant hoops; chicken rearers; pheasant feeders; a [river] bathing chair; wheelbarrows; potato scales; creosoting tank and shed; a water-driven mill-wheel with 75 ft of shafting and gear wheels; eight pairs of curling stones; field hen houses on wheels; wooden field sheds; corn bins, morticing machines; ferret boxes, and much more. This section of the sale also included some more extraordinary items such as Mr Mackirdy's A-size 'Improved New Volunteer Steam Fire Engine' capable of discharging 200 gallons of water per minute to a height of 140 feet. Also included was the octagonal stone summer house of 9ft 6 inches x 7 ft 6 inches, with door and windows, which stood on a promontory overlooking the confluence of the St. Brides Burn with the Nethan Water. It is unclear to what extent all or some of these items and structures were sold, but some items were retained by the auctioneer and continued to be offered for sale until at least early 1922.

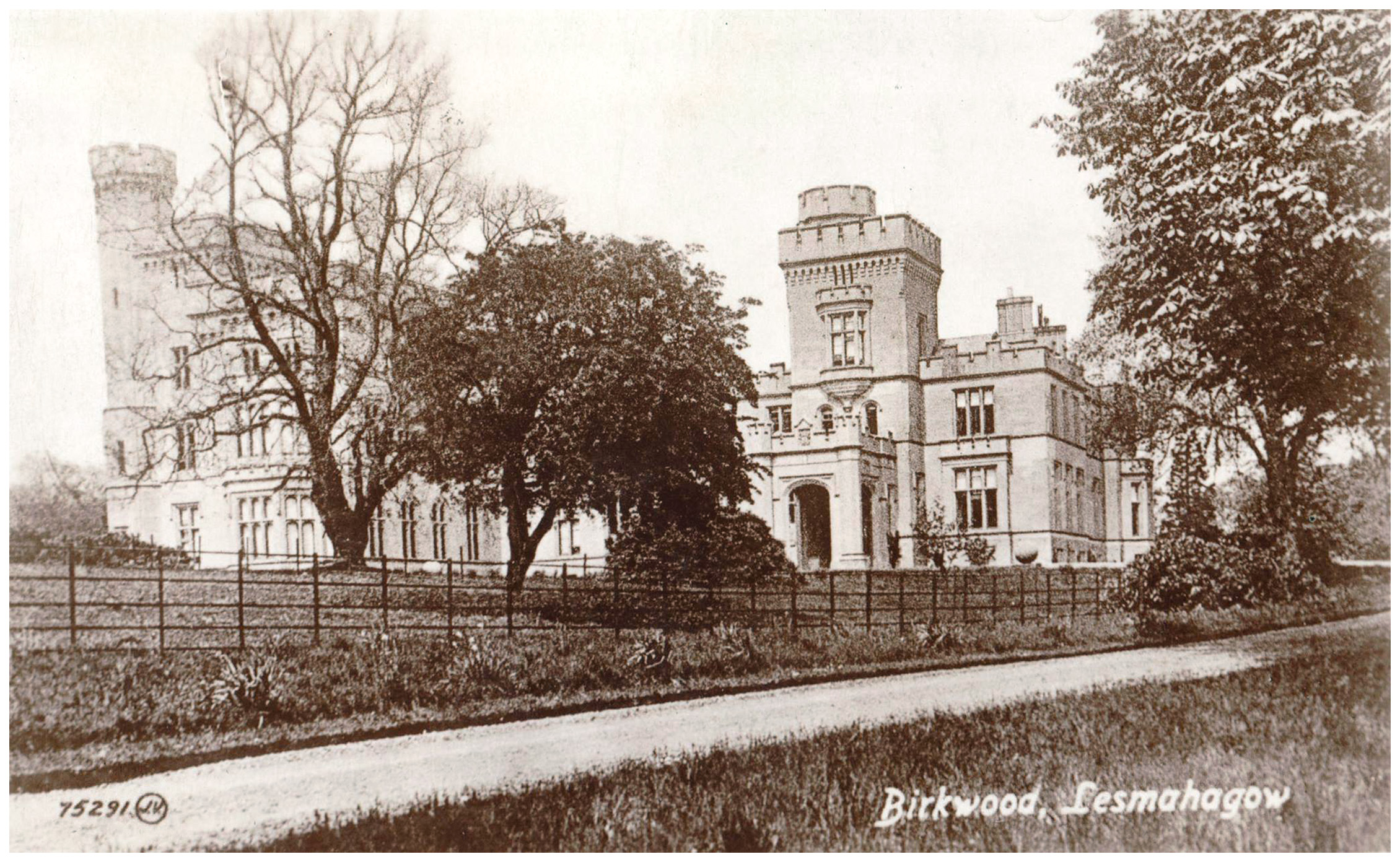
Birkwood from the south - An early 1900s postcard view (ex-copyright)

== Final house sale and institutional repurposing ==
A lack of interest continued to be shown in offers for the mansion house and policies. By September 1922 the owner was still marketing the property, but was using Lesmahagow's Royal Bank manager, T. D. Allan, as his agent. In the months before July 1923, Captain MacKirdy finally negotiated to sell the remainder of the estate and mansion for £10,000 to the County Council of Lanark's 'District Board of Control', for use as a residential clinic for mental defectives. Prompted by the sale, Captain MacKirdy arranged further auctions to sell off the remaining contents of the mansion and policies that he had retained for his own use. These sales took place on 01 and 02 August 1923, and mostly comprised the contents of the mansion's drawing room, dining room, library, bedrooms, and some other areas. The auctions were handled by Lawrie & Symington Ltd of Lanark. These sales offered many of Mackirdy's reserved items but also some that had remained unsold in previous years. They included various carpets, quilts, paintings, engravings, nearly 1,200 books, plate silver, crystal, armour, curios, and much else.

It is unclear when the Lanark District Board of Control took physical occupation of the house and policies, but they intimated as early as 29 October 1923 that they were then "in a position to receive a limited number of juvenile mental defectives in Birkwood Institution, Lesmahagow, the rate of board being £1 1s per week". The property was licensed for such use earlier in May 1923. Thus, it is clear that some more recent sources asserting July 1923 as the date of opening are quite mistaken, and possibly confused with the month in which the Board took physical possession. The position by mid December 1923 was more solid: the same Board reported that the Birkwood Institution was open, and the chairman of the Board provided an outline of the property's acquisition, its cost, and details of his official visit to determine its suitability for the care of juvenile mental defectives. In review of the price paid, the chairman suggested it was 'practically a thief's bargain'. At its time of opening, and for some years afterwards, the staff member heading the institution was a Ms Davidson. By November 1924 the institution had some inmates, but it was still being 'gradually equipped and furnished so as to provide for up to 100 cases'. At that time there were just 27 patients.

By 1927 the building had an associated school building erected in its grounds by Lanark County Council's Education Department. It was equipped along 'modern lines' and had a decoration scheme created by a young Wishaw artist named Mr Harry Taylor.

By May 1927 the Birkwood Institution had 125 patients in residence.

On 11 July 1927, flash floods wreaked havoc along the banks of the Nethan Water which flows through the estate. This included the partial destruction of Birkwood Bridge at the Greenholm side of the policies.

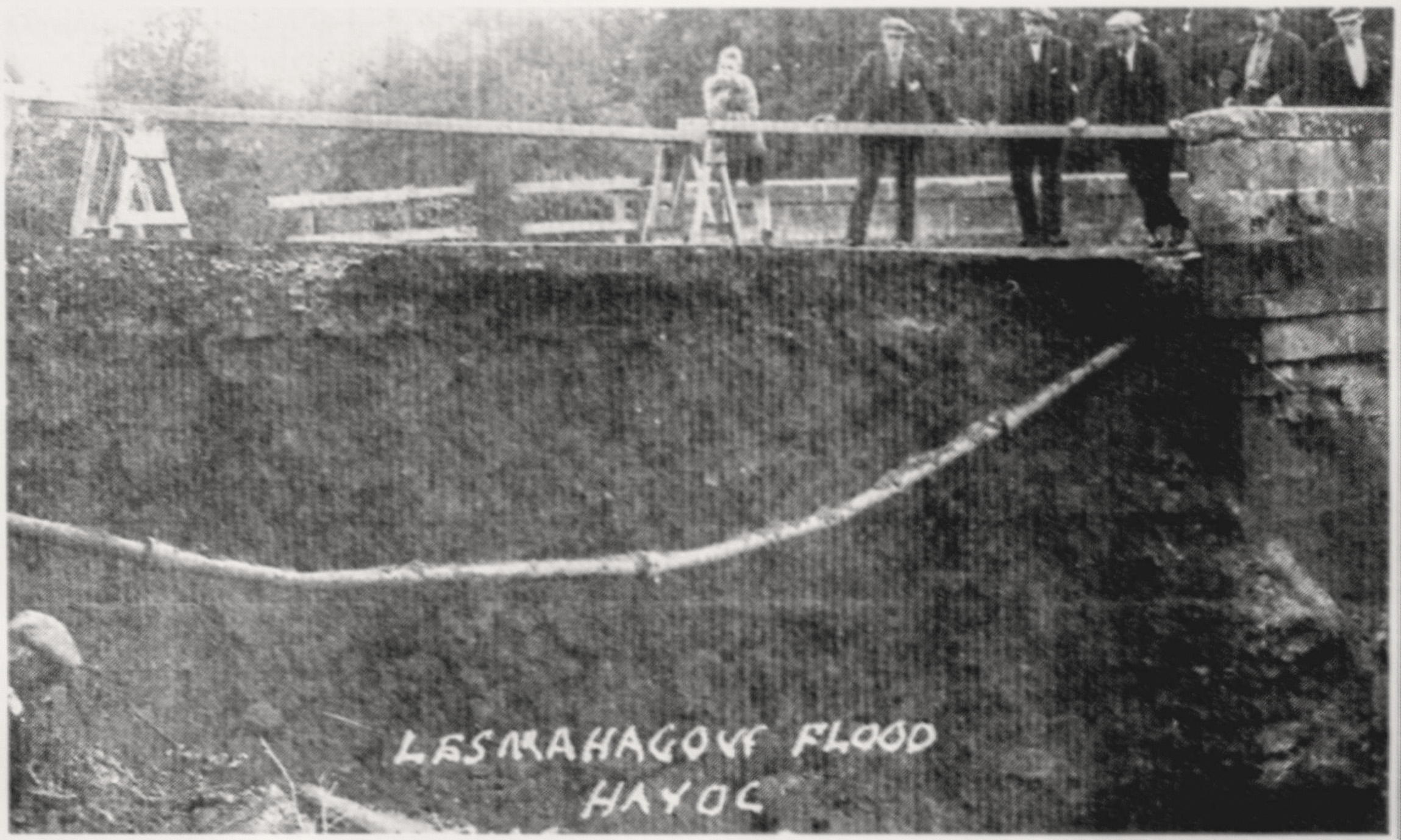
The Lesmahagow Flood, showing damage caused to Birkwood Bridge - July 1927 (ex-copyright image)

Some insight into the activities and perceived role of child patients at Birkwood is provided in published coverage of Lanark Education Authority's candidates in March 1928: It was observed that 'mentally defective' children at Birkwood were very suitably catered for, and one visiting candidate had viewed rugs and certain kinds of sewing produced by the children. It was suggested that the authority was doing good work in spending time and money on fostering those skills because the training of such children could better their chances for earning a living when they grew up, thereby encouraging greater independence and an industry that would benefit the county. the burden of ongoing care paid by ratepayers was a pressing part of the context. Another visit to the institution in June 1928 by a party of parish councillors, lent the impression that the children at Birkwood were 'quite at home' and 'well cared for'. In a later report charting the progress of the institution's school between May 1929 and May 1930 - reported publicly under the subtitle 'How the mentally weak are maintained' - it was noted that:

"The progress made by some of the children who attended school proves the wisdom of erecting and equipping such a modern type of building. Handwork was given a prominent place in the school curriculum with very satisfactory results." However, the institution's superintendent Ms Davidson reported that of the many children resident, only three were classed as 'educable' and even those were "of lower mentality that the average educable admissions of former years".

At that time an additional hospital block was also in the course of construction within the grounds. This building was intended for 'a very helpless type of defective'. It was sited sufficiently close to the main building to ensure efficient transit and supervision. In additions to the additions described, it is also recorded that other 'extensions' to the facilities were erected in 1921, 1946 and 1958. The new wing 1958 completed in cost £94,000 and accommodated up to 80 additional patients. The wing was designed by Mr Lockhart W. Hutson, O.B.E., F.R.I.B.A. of 199 Cadzow Street, Hamilton. The tenders for contractors were advertised in the summer of 1955. The building features copper roofing features, linoleum flooring, and various tile and terazzo works.

In the year 1967, it was reported that the Birkwood Hospital had 316 mental deficiency beds. It was also reported at that time that a new kitchen and stores block had recently been built in the grounds.

A canteen on the site was taken over in May 1962 by the Lesmahagow branch of the Women's Royal Voluntary Service (W.R.V.S.), which operated it for many years, mostly on Saturdays, until its final closure on 29 May 1999. In fact, it was the need for such a service that led to the 'rebirth' of the W.R.V.S. in Lesmahagow. The facility operated as a visitors canteen, but there was also a tuck shop section. The presence of the W.R.V.S. in the hospital soon led to the development of other services, mostly to cater for the needs of patients. These included hairdressing, chat time for patients, and various fundraisers to buy equipment for patients, such as television sets and record players. By the 1970s-80s these efforts extended to securing medical and leisure equipment for the hospital. The success of the W.R.V.S. at Birkwood led to so much fundraising that they were able to support the needs of several other hospitals and healthcare centres, care homes, and establish a mobile 'Meals on Wheels' service.

Of note, is that prior to 1970, a number of the cattle shows of the Lesmahagow Farmers Society took place in the grounds of Birkwood. Previously the society showed at the Kerse and the Village Glebe, and after Birkwood it relocated its events to Auldton Farm. Another key public event was the annual Birkwood Garden Fete, which also took place for many years in the grounds. It tended to feature stalls operated by the local police and fire brigade services. These fetes consisted of the usual numerous trade stalls, face-painting, wet sponge throwing, raffles, and silver band performances, to name a few.

== Hospital demise ==
Following the reorganisation of mental health care in the 1990s, the hospital's scope and facilities were deemed quite outdated. Birkwood was eventually closed in stages, with full locking up of the building allegedly occurring in 2005.

The anticipation in the late 1990s that closure would eventually come to Birkwood prompted South Lanarkshire Council to explore the site's potential for housing, elements of which they incorporated into the draft of the published Lower Clydesdale Local Plan. Following consultation, the Council formally advised that they would prepare specific guidance for Birkwood's redevelopment, and would not permit any high density 'suburban' type housing on the site.

After some years of speculation about Birkwood's future, it was announced around mid-June 2000 that the final decision had been made to close Birkwood Hospital within five years. The decision came after the Scottish Executive stated that "institutionalised care is no longer suitable for people with learning difficulties". This followed upon older discussions and changes in policies in the early 1990s which led to Birkwood being earmarked for a provisional closure by the year 2000. The proposed closure was part of a programme of closure that would affect all long-stay hospitals catering for people with learning difficulties. Thereafter, the closure of Birkwood went out for public consultation, with a deadline set for 30 September 2000. It was communicated by the NHS Trust that well over 100 former patients of the hospital had been settled into the community with appropriate support in recent years, and their intention was to do the same with the patients planned for discharge.

The main period of institutional wind-down and staff departure occurred in late September 2002. In the lead-up to this closure, many of the hospital's contents such as lamps, books, desks and chairs, were sold off using special on-site 'silent auctions', intended so as not to disturb remaining patients. The Lesmahagow service of the Key Housing Association was established in June 2002 to provide high quality care and housing support to people who had left Birkwood Hospital in the previous year to move into their own homes.

It was during this period that a local volunteer initiative was set up, headed by Heritage Officer, Robert McLeish, to create a Birkwood Heritage Project. This was intended to collate the history of Birkwood Hospital and was to form the basis of a publication and an exhibition towards the end of 2002. This reflected the tail-end of earlier heritage efforts in connection with Birkwood: In May 1999, mainly owing to the drive and persistence of Lesmahagow Parish Historical Association and the said archival researcher Robert McLeish, members of the Scott MacKirdy family (the originally owners of Birkwood), made an official visit to their ancestral home. The family were furnished with copies of all the information about Birkwood held in the association's archive.

== Post-closure history ==
Following closure of the hospital, the estate agent Ryden set a closing date on 17 January 2003 for the acceptance of offers for the purchase of Birkwood. By the end of January 2003, it was projected that months would be needed for the LAnarkshire NHS Trust to evaluate the bids received and name the eventual buyer. On this matter, Clydesdale MSP Karen Gillon urged NHS Lanarkshire to ensure that the winning bid would lead to a suitable development at Birkwood that would benefit the local community; be it developing employment opportunities, enhancing the environment, or improving local infrastructure. By August that year the Lanarkshire Primary Care NHS Trust responded to an inquiry to suggest their preferred bidder was the Auchlochan Trust, a charity that supports the relief of those in need by reason of age, ill health, disability, financial hardship or other disadvantages. However progress stalled, and by May 2004 the estate had still not been sold, despite the Auchlochan Trust remaining the preferred bidder. In the meantime, the NHS Trust owners offered Birkwood for various moneymaking opportunities, including its use as a film set for an episode of the BBC's Sea of Souls. Two rooms inside the castle were suitably prepared for the film crews.

Plans were subsequently approved to convert the house to a hotel in 2009, but the developer went into liquidation before work started. On around 21 July 2015, the majority of the 1890s western wing collapsed, with a sound which nearby residents likened to an explosion. The final traces of this wing were demolished to consolidate the ruin as far as its linking wing to the remaining building.

In 2016, South Lanarkshire Council gave planning permission for a £15 million conversion of the house to a hotel. This hotel was part of a planned £80 million redevelopment of the castle and its grounds. In January 2018, the castle was put up for sale after its owners went into administration. Later in the year, it was recommended that Birkwood Castle should be demolished, as it was a "major safety risk". The plan was to keep the bell tower and front entrance, as they were structurally secure.

On the night of 14 May 2025, a large fire occurred on the roof of the mansion under mysterious circumstances, especially given its rapidity of onset and the severely restricted roof access. The incident followed a prolonged period of dry weather. The fire destroyed much of the modern roofing that had been cast over the east and north wings to keep the building's gutted shell watertight and structurally stable. The fire prompted an official statement from Councillor Ross Gowland for Clydesdale South - to seek an update on the situation from the local authority on the building's situation in due course. The incident occurred days after significant public upset was caused online after the remains of a complex Solomonic ritual involving a magic circle were discovered by members of the public in a part of the mansion. This led to local residents casting fears over potentially malevolent witchcraft practices, and the possibility that the genii locorum of the building had responded negatively.

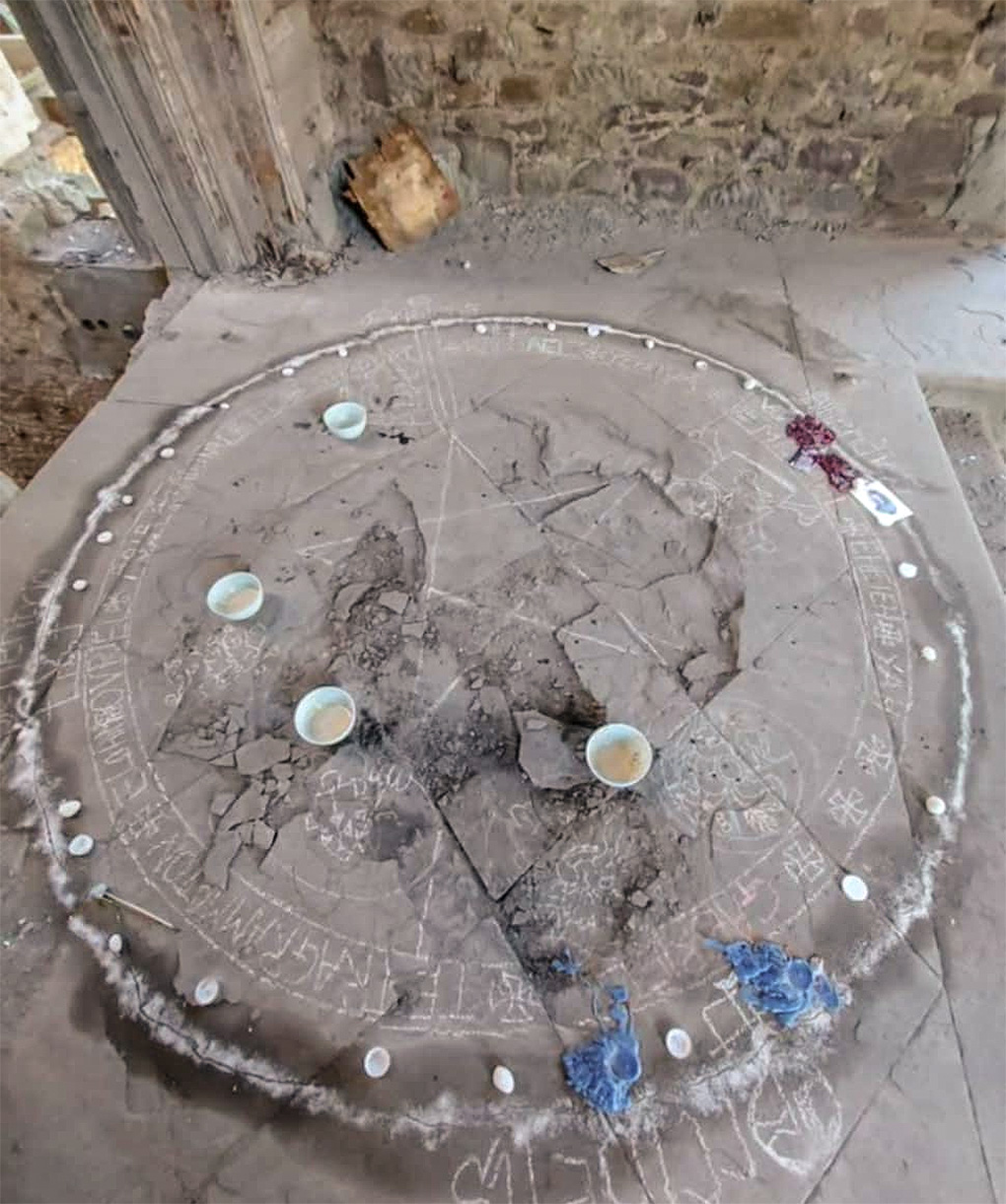
Solomonic 'magic circle' at Birkwood Castle, photographed on 13 May 2025

Originally over 1,000 acres in extent, the present policy grounds and woodland associated with Birkwood now cover an area of approximately 86 acres (35 ha). The mansion ruin is a category B listed building. The building, since its abandonment as a hospital, has long been on the official Buildings at Risk Register maintained by Historic Environment Scotland, with regular entries made to it in twenty years since the building's closure. An entry dated 27 September 2013 noted that:

"External inspection finds all buildings within the former hospital site are disused and derelict. There is widespread dampness evident to the mansion house walls. Downpipes have failed in places, with vegetation growth encroaching. Ground floor windows are mostly boarded over, some internally. Some security fencing has been erected. South Lanarkshire Council's proposed Development Plan, May 2013, noted the former hospital site as one of the area's development priorites. Moved to At Risk."

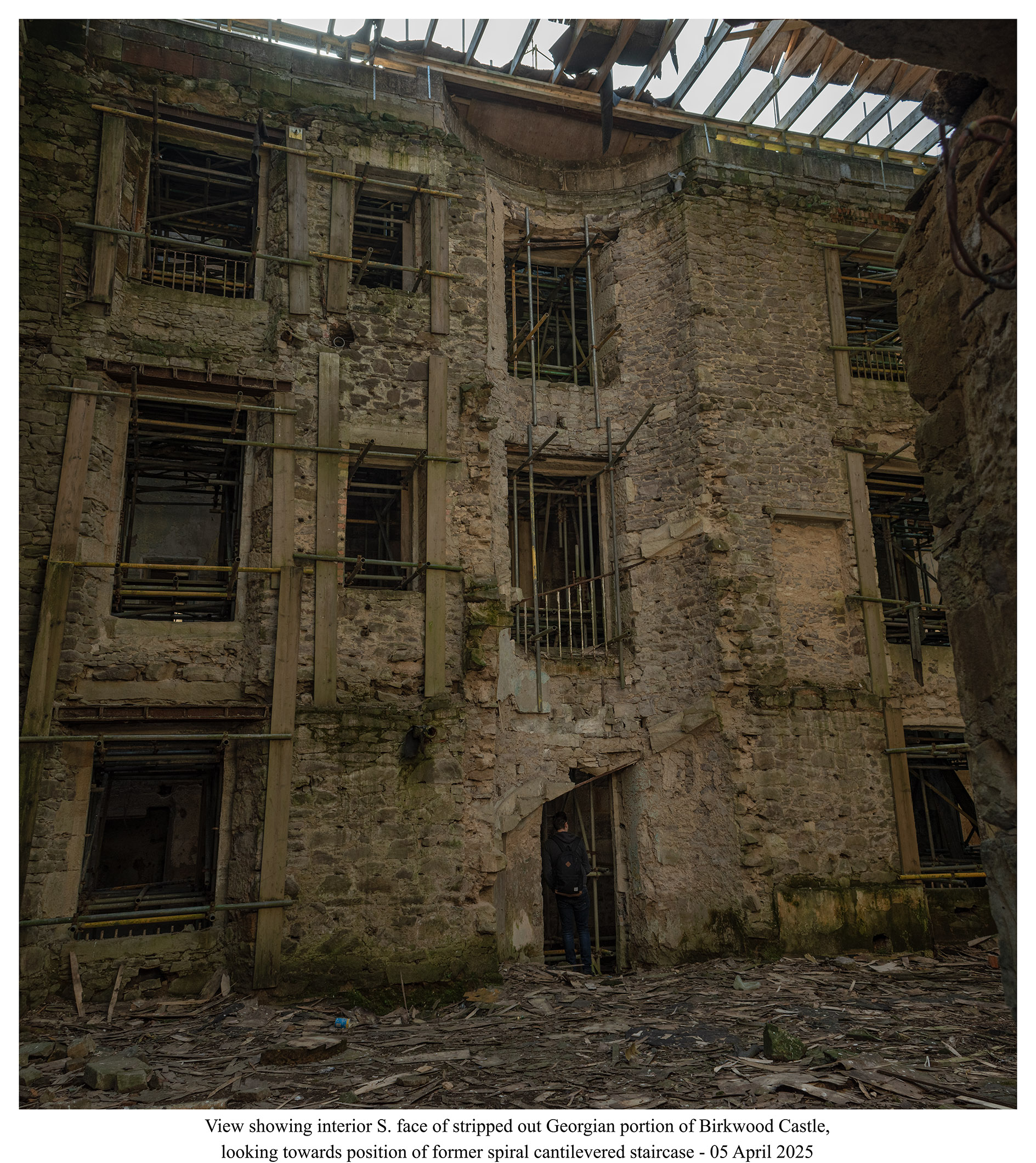
An interior view towards the southern face of the original late-18th century Georgian house incorporated within the mansion of Birkwood. 05 April 2025.

== Landscaping ==
The designed landscape of Birkwood Castle incorporates typical areas of informally tree-planted parkland pasture reflecting the influences of the English landscape style dominant and influential in the 18th and 19th centuries, with many trees dateable to these periods. Some may be older and reflect the earlier tendency to plant specimen trees close to mansions houses. The importance of these trees was recognised by South Lanarkshire Council following public appeals over their contribution to landscape character. This resulted in a potential developer being instructed to undertake a full survey of mature, specimen or veteran trees, the public domain results of which are as follows:

Species Breakdown Pedunculate Oak, Turkey Oak, Sessile Oak, Common Lime, Beech (including two Copper Beech), Silver Birch, Yew, Irish Yew, Sycamore, Goat Willow, Wellingtonia (Giant Sequoia), Lawson's Cypress, Lawson's Cypress cultivars, Noble Fir, Norway Spruce, European Ash, Laburnum, Elm (poss. Wych), Horse Chestnut, and Rowan. The species described comprise several hundred trees surveyed within the parklands and policy woodlands.

In addition to the species listed, some public awareness and concern was raised on the local Lesmahagow forum concerning notable trees missed by the survey, as well as subsequent formal communication with the local authority to resolve the matter. This primarily related to a large, mature specimen of Walnut growing west of the mansion house.

== Ghostlore ==
The house has allegedly been haunted by a cigar-smoking spirit and the ghost of a man stabbed through the throat. When a group of Glasgow paranormal experts filmed at the house in 2013 for their work Haunted Planet TV, they described the house as "one of the most active locations they had ever filmed." In 2015, part of the house's wall collapsed, and there were reports of an explosion. Local paranormal experts attributed this to the house being haunted.

== The name 'Birkwood Castle' ==
Contentions over whether the naming element of 'castle' is justified or not in reference to a Victorian mansion, tend to proceed on the assumption that such a name only legitimately applies to older fortified dwellings, but misses the fact that in Victorian architectural nomenclature, names like 'priory' and 'castle' were intended to evoke their architectural allusions rather than their genuine purpose. As such, it was a deliberate cultural act of associationism, and potted studies of this trend in architectural naming are prominent for some noted examples of Gothic Revival, such as Strawberry Hill House, which its creator Horace Walpole tended to call his 'Strawberry Castle'. Other prominent examples in Scotland include Crawford Priory, Calderwood Castle, Cambusnethan Priory, and Taymouth Castle. A similar philosophy is detected in contemporary accounts of Birkwood in the 1890s, when it was extended to a large enough size that might justify a newer 'castle' allusion:

"It may here be stated that Birkwood House, is one, if not the, most magnificent mansion in Scotland, the present General M'Kirdy having within the last two years added a wing to the house at an enormous cost, so that strangers, viewing the mansion from a distance, never think of asking whose house or whose mansion it is, but who lives in that castle and who does it belong to. In the opinion of the strangers it should no longer be called Birkwood House, but Birkwood Castle."

== Public access to policies ==
The landscape setting of Birkwood enjoys several longstanding rights of access in the form of official rights of way and similar. Following its purchase for use as a hospital, the policies were regarded as the property of the ratepayers of the several parishes which contributed to the institution's upkeep, and so the area was promoted and well-used for scenic walks and similar. Older still is the Right of Way which passed from New Trows to Woodhead, thence to Monstable Bridge over the Nethan, into Birkwood policies, thence towards Pathhead via the Rook Wood, to enter the village of Lesmahagow.. This route in one form or another, remains in use, albeit with detours to avoid the partially collapsed footbridge at the Pathhead end. The legitimacy of the Right of Way had been determined in court cases at least as early as 1850 (McGhie versus Mackirdy), and was reignited in a quarrel over bridge repair responsibilities in 1921. In the 1850 legal dispute, the footpath was determined to have 'immemorial usage', and was for the pursuers: always a 'necessary or valuable right or accommodation'. Earlier, in 1810, the proprietor of Pathhead applied to the trustees under the local Statute Labour Act for Lanarkshire, setting forth that the route was inconvenient to them and the public, and that a better road should be provided by creating a bridge over the Nethan. This was approved, and the father of the defender of the 1850 case - the same proprietor of Pathhead - erected a suitable bridge. Thereafter the section of the older road on the western side of the Nethan Water was shut up, and the new detour via the bridge substituted in its place. Sunsequently the proprietor of Birkwood gained possession of Pathhead, and they used their possession of the same to argue that the great amount of disuse, time and encroachment of undergrowth had removed traces of the older road via Pathhead. It was claimed the newer route via the bridge represented the Right of Way. This was rejected by the court, and so the Right of Way via Pathhead continued to be legally observed in addition to its detour created for road traffic and freight.
