= Mollica =

Mollica is a family name of Italian origin. Notable people with the surname include:

- Achille Mollica (1832–1885), Italian painter
- Emanuele Mollica (1820–1977), Italian painter
- Lauren Mollica (born 1980), American skateboarder
- Massimo Mollica (1929–2013), Italian actor and stage director
- Peter Mollica (born 1941), American stained glass artist
- Richard Mollica (born 1946), American academic and writer
- Ruaridh Mollica, Scottish-Italian actor
