= Séjour =

Séjour is a French surname. Notable people with the surname include:

- Achille Pierre Dionis du Séjour (1734–1794), French astronomer and mathematician
- Victor Séjour (1817–1874), American expatriate writer who worked in France
- Jean Dionis du Séjour (born 1956), French politician
