= Achille Peretti =

Achille Peretti may refer to:

- Achille Peretti (artist) (1850s–1923), Italian-American painter
- Achille Peretti (politician) (1911–1983), French politician
