= Enrico Sartori =

Italian painter (1831–1889)

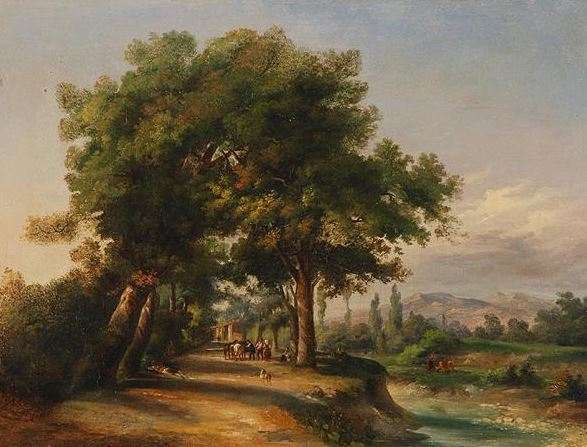
Unititled landscape

Enrico Sartori (4 February 1831 – 25 October 1889) was an Italian painter, mainly of genre subjects, typically peasants, but also battle scenes and troop parades.

== Biography ==
He was born and died in Parma. He first enrolled at the age of 13 years in the Parmesan Academy of Fine Arts, and studied painting under the direction first by Giuseppe Boccaccio, and after 1852 by Luigi Marchesi. In 1858, he won a first prize for his painting titled Pontaccio di Valera and earned a scholarship to travel to Rome. He returned to Parma in 1859, painting mainly rural genre scenes, but developed his skill with military scenes.

He was a prolific. At the 1870 Parmesan Mostra of Fine Arts, he exhibited. La fiera di Bestiame nel campo di Marte in Parma; La raccolta del fieno; Veduta of Ceno near Varsi; Manovra dei Lancieri Novara in the piazza d'armi in Parma; Strada maestra San Michele in Parma nel carnevale 1870; Retreat from Russia on 3 September 1812; Veduta presa dal torrente Parma; Mercato dei Bozzoli nel Cortile della Pilotta in Parma; Manovra dei Lancieri Nizza in the piazza d'armi di Parma; and Manovra di sciaboli del reggimento Lancieri Nizza in the piazza d'armi di Parma. In Turin, in 1880: Passeggiata di cavalleria Monferrato near Parma. In Milan, in 1881: Cavalry Manoevre; Passeggiata del septimo infanteria. In 1882 at Florence, he exhibited: Manovra di cavalleria Monferrato and Istruzioni militari. In Milan, in 1883, he exhibited a painting: Amore allo studio and a studio dal vero. Finalmente in Turin, in 1884: Manovre tattiche and Cavalleria Monferrato in piazza d'armi di Parma.
