= Eugène Müntz =

French art historian

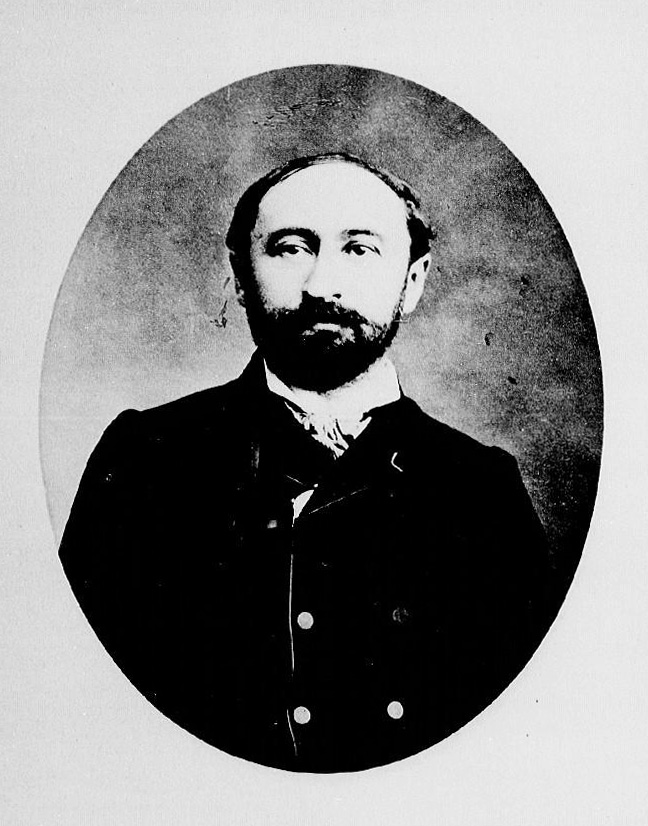
Müntz between 1884 and 1890

Eugène Müntz (11 June 1845 – 30 October 1902) was a French art historian who specialized in the Italian Renaissance art.

== LIfe and career ==
Eugène Müntz was born on 11 June 1845 in Soultz-sous-Forêts, Bas-Rhin. His brother was Achille Müntz, who became an agricultural chemist.

From 1873 to 1876 he was a member of the École française de Rome. He was a professor of art history at the École des Beaux-arts, where he lectured from 1885 to 1893.

In 1893 he became a member of the Académie des Inscriptions et Belles-Lettres, and in 1898 was elected president of the Société de l'histoire de Paris et de l'Île-de-France.

== Literary works ==
- Notes sur les mosaïques de l'Italie, 1874–92.
- Les arts à la cour des papes pendant le XV^{e} et le XVI^{e} siècle, 4 Vols., 1878–1898.
- Les précurseurs de la Renaissance, 1881.
- Raphaël, sa vie, son œuvre et son temps, 1881.
- Histoire de la tapisserie, 1882.
- Etudes sur l'histoire de la peinture et de l'iconographie chrétiennes, 1882.
- Müntz, Eugène (1888). L'Histoire des Arts dans la Ville d'Avignon Pendant le XIVe Siècle. Paris: Ernest Leroux.
- Histoire de l'art pendant la Renaissance, 3 volumes, 1888–1894
- Léonard da Vinci, l'artiste, le penseur, le savant, translated into English in 1899 and published as Leonardo da Vinci, artist, thinker, and man of science.
