= Achille Formis =

Italian painter (1832–1906)

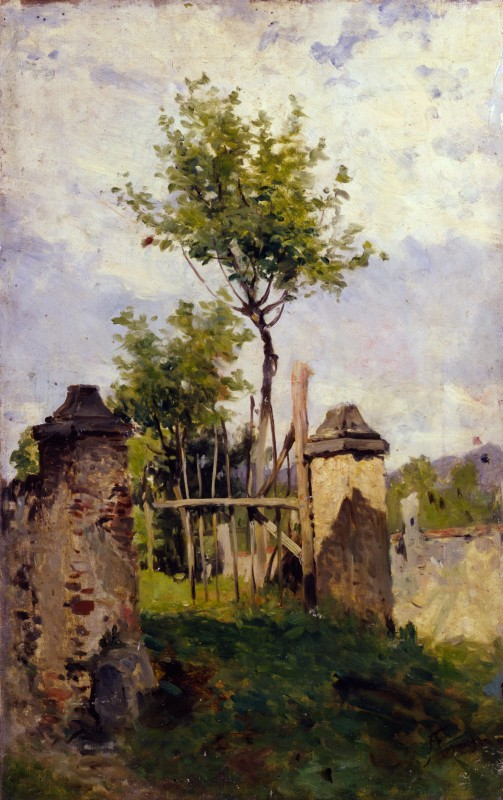
Paesaggio, 1890 ca. (Fondazione Cariplo)

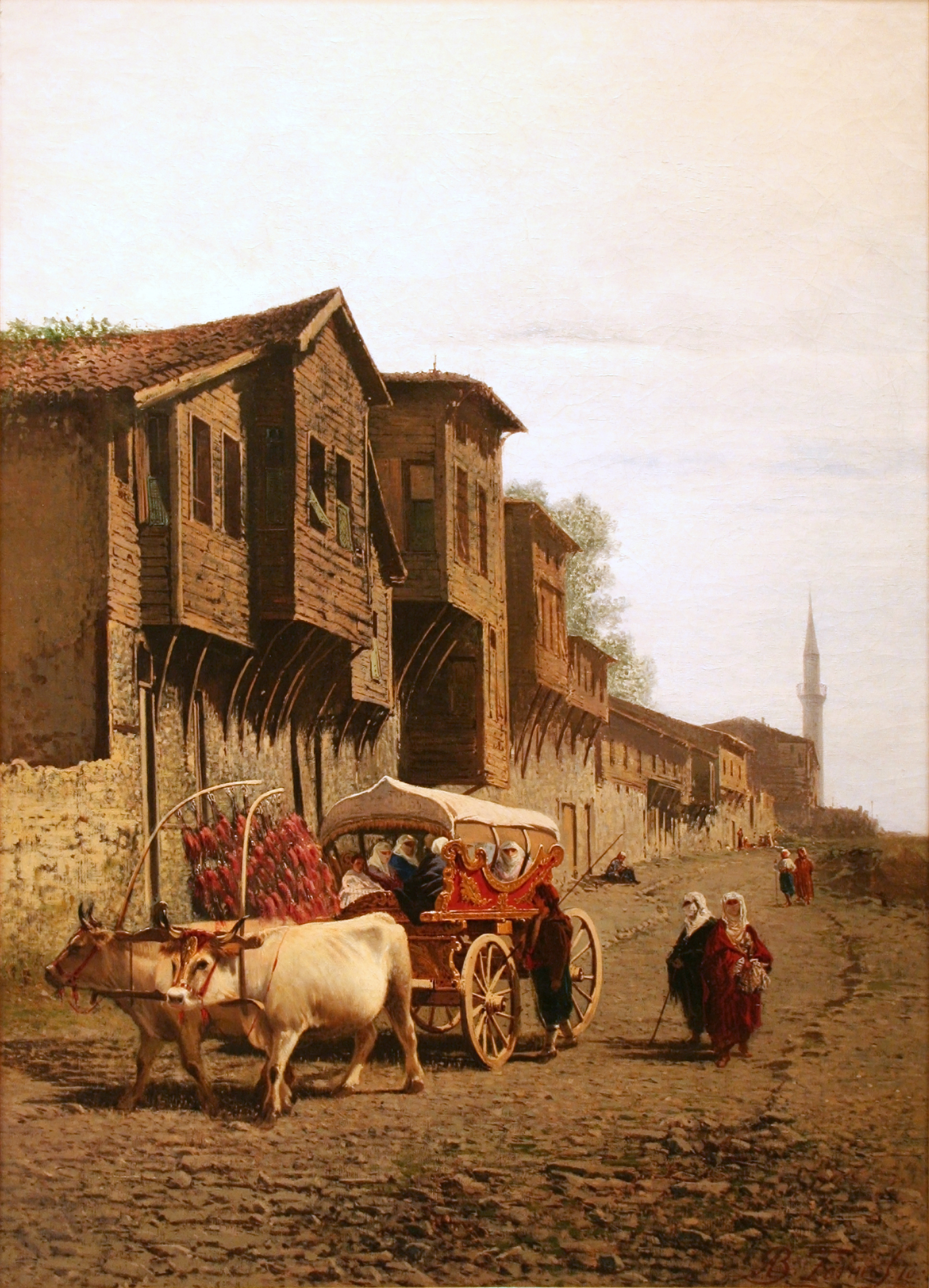
The "Koçu" Cart, 1870, Pera Museum, Istanbul

Achille Formis Befani (1832–1906) was an Italian painter, better known as Achille Formis.

== Biography ==
He was born in Naples and embarked on a singing career there. This was abandoned in the early 1860s when he moved to Milan to attend courses of the Brera Academy of Fine Arts under the pseudonym Formis. The works on Eastern subjects that he painted on his return from repeated travels in the Near East were highly esteemed. These were joined in the 1870s by landscapes set in the Lombard countryside and the area around Lake Maggiore, which made Formis a respected figure in the school of Lombard Naturalism alongside painters like Eugenio Gignous, his friend since the years at the Brera. He took part in the annual Brera exhibitions and the Esposizione Nazionale Artistica of 1887 in Venice, where he returned in 1899 with a view of the countryside around Mantua. He also exhibited work in Berlin (1896) and Munich in 1901 and 1906, the year of his death in Milan.
