= Achille Enoc Mariano =

Italian politician (1933–2025)

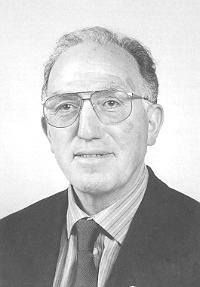
- Achille Enoc Mariano in 1994

Member of the Chamber of Deputies of Italy for Maglie
- In office 7 April 1994 – 8 May 1996

Personal details
- Born: 6 December 1933 Muro Leccese, Italy
- Died: 3 October 2025 (aged 91)
- Political party: AN
- Occupation: Insurance agent

Achille Enoc Mariano (6 December 1933 – 3 October 2025) was an Italian politician. A member of the National Alliance, he served in the Chamber of Deputies from 1994 to 1996.

Mariano died on 3 October 2025, at the age of 91.
