= Achille Granchi-Taylor =

French painter

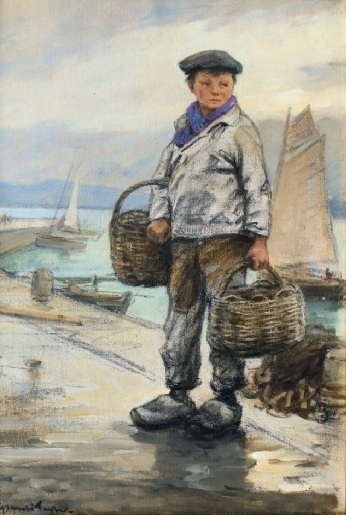
- "Jeune Pêcheur au panier"
- Born: 1857; Lyon
- Died: 1921 (aged 63–64); Asnières
- Known for: Painter and illustrator

Achille Granchi-Taylor (born in Lyon in 1857 and died in Asnières in 1921) was a French painter and illustrator.

== Biography ==
His father was an Italian immigrant and commercial traveller and his mother English. He passed his youth in Paris and when he resolved to follow painting he joined the studios of Fernand Cormon. Between 1886 and 1888 he settled in Pont-Aven. He married a cousin and finally moved to Asnières finding the Breton climate too harsh. The paintings of Achille Granchi-Taylor are full of melancholy and he captured the harsh life endured by the fishing community, painting scenes depicting the return of fishing boats and paintings of Breton women waiting on the quay for their husbands to return. In 1905 he designed a poster for the "La Fête des Filets Bleus", created in that year to help the victims of the crisis which had hit the sardine industry.

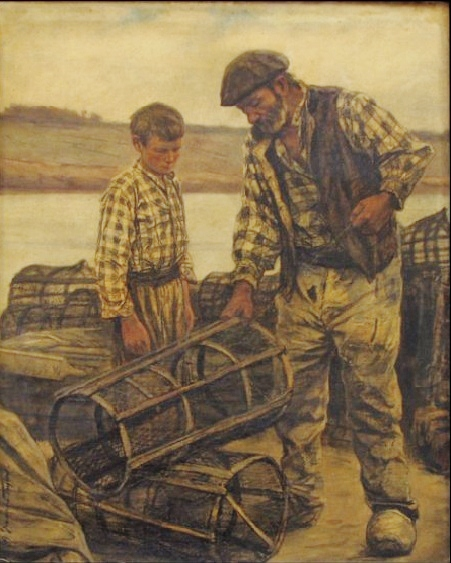
"La Préparation des casiers". A casier is a lobster pot

== Works in public collections ==
- "Mousses mouillant le grappin". A painting dating to 1893 held in the Musée du vieux château in Laval.
- "Les paysans sardiniers". An 1899 painting held in the Morlaix Musée des beaux-arts.
- "Chômage". Shown at the 1891 Salon des artistes français and now held in the Quimper Musée des beaux-arts.
- "L'attente des pêcheurs". Painting held in the Brest Musée des beaux-arts.
- "Pêcheur de raies". An 1880 decorative panel executed for the Château de Trévarez and held in Concarneau's Mairie.
- "Les porteuses de thon". Painting held in Marseille's Musée des beaux-arts.
- "Étude de marin-pêcheur Breton". Painting held in Rennes' Musée des beaux-arts.
- "Gourlaouen, pêcheur de Pont-Aven". Painting held in Rennes' Musée des beaux-arts.

== Paintings exhibited at the Salon des artistes français ==
- "Marâtre" (1888)
- "Dur à fendre" (1889)
- "Tannée des voiles et des filets à Concarneau".

== Illustrations ==
- René Bazin, "Madame Cornentine" (1905)
- Victor Hugo, Les travailleurs de la mer
- Œuvres de Théodore Botrel
- Illustrations pour la presse (notamment pour la revue Mame)
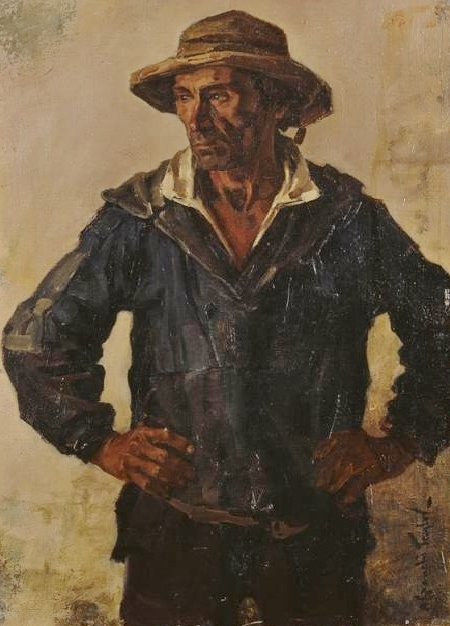
"Gourlaouen, pêcheur de Pont-Aven". Painted around 1911 and held in Rennes' Musée des beaux-arts.

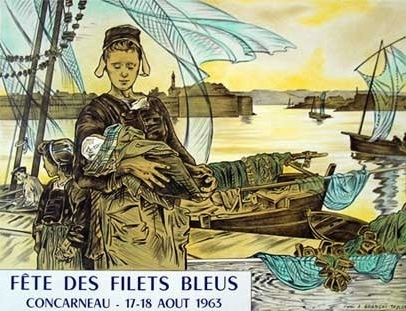
Poster for "la Fête des Filets bleus".

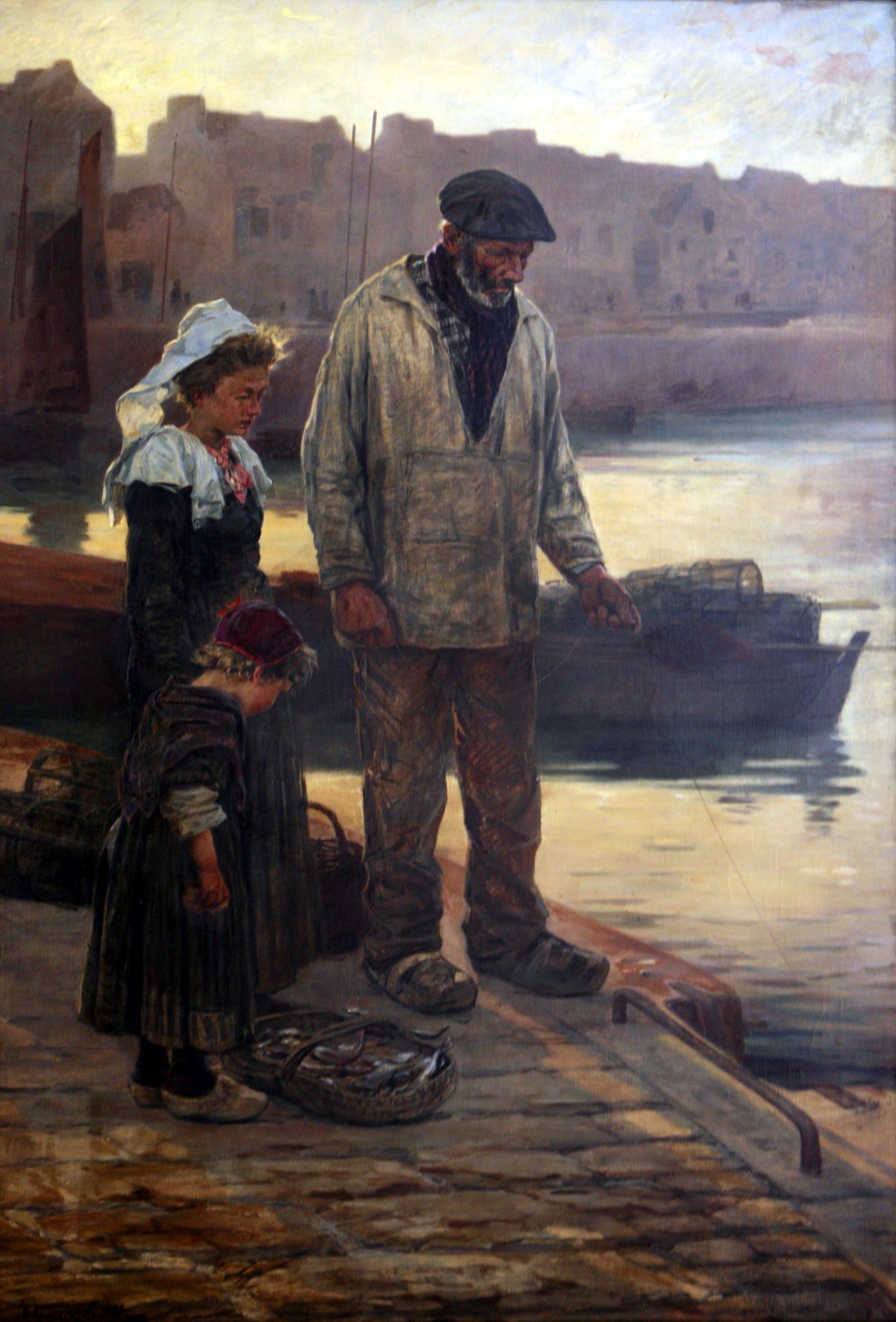
"Pauvre pêcheur de Concarneau". Held in Brest's Musée des beaux-arts.

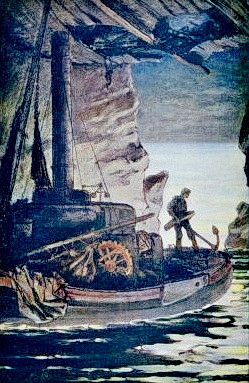
Illustration for the Victor Hugo novel "Les travailleurs de la mer"
