= Achille Solari =

Italian painter (1835–1884)

Achille Solari (October 9, 1835 – 1884) was an Italian painter, mainly of landscapes of the region around Naples.

Born in Naples, he obtained a stipend from the province of Terra di Lavoro to study at the Institute of Fine Arts of Naples, and earned prizes and a stipend in Naples from his province. He painted in oil and watercolor. He exhibited in 1884 in Turin, and in London he exhibited a landscape. He exhibited repeatedly at the Promotrice of Naples and others, watercolors and oils, of land and seascapes, including a Veduta di Santa Lucia in Naples. He painted in a style reminiscent of his rough contemporaries Giacinto Gigante and Gabriele Smargiassi.
