= Achille Cattaneo =

Italian painter (1872–1931)

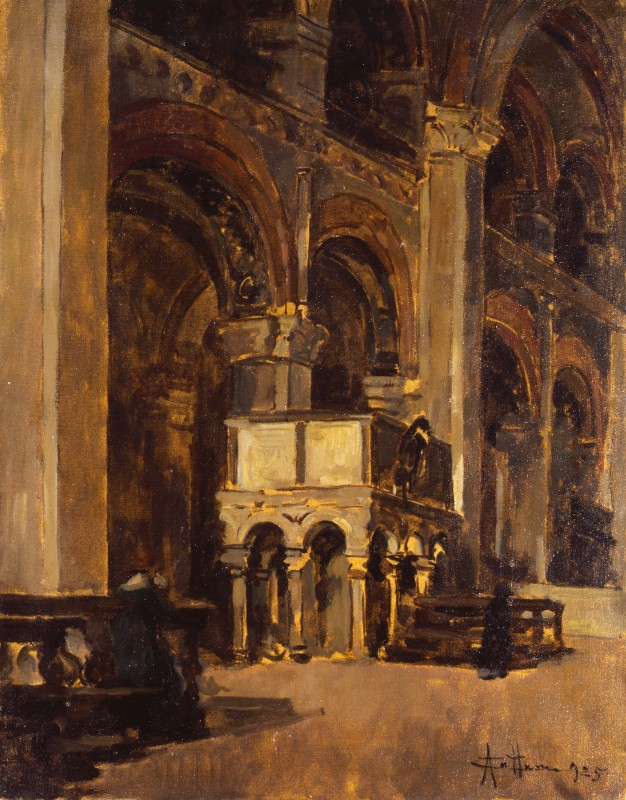
Interno della chiesa di Sant'Ambrogio, 1925 (Fondazione Cariplo)

Achille Cattaneo (1872–1931) was an Italian painter.

== Biography ==
Cattaneo was born in Limbiate, Italy. He attended the courses of drawing and architecture at the Brera Academy, where he was taught by Emilio Gola, from 1888 to 1896. He began to work within the tradition of 19th-century urban painting, producing views of the Milanese canals and especially interiors of churches in Milan and Venice. His work was shown for the first time at the Milan Società delle Belle Arti in 1900 and he achieved fame in the 1920s. He held a solo show at the Bottega di Poesia in 1925 and took part in the first exhibition of the Novecento Italiano movement (Milan, 1926). His works were shown at the Venice Biennale (Esposizione Internazionale d’Arte di Venezia) in 1924, 1926 and 1928 and in Milan (Esposizione Nazionale di Milano) in 1925 and 1927.

== Other projects ==
Media related to Achille Cattaneo at Wikimedia Commons
