= Achille Müntz =

French agricultural chemist

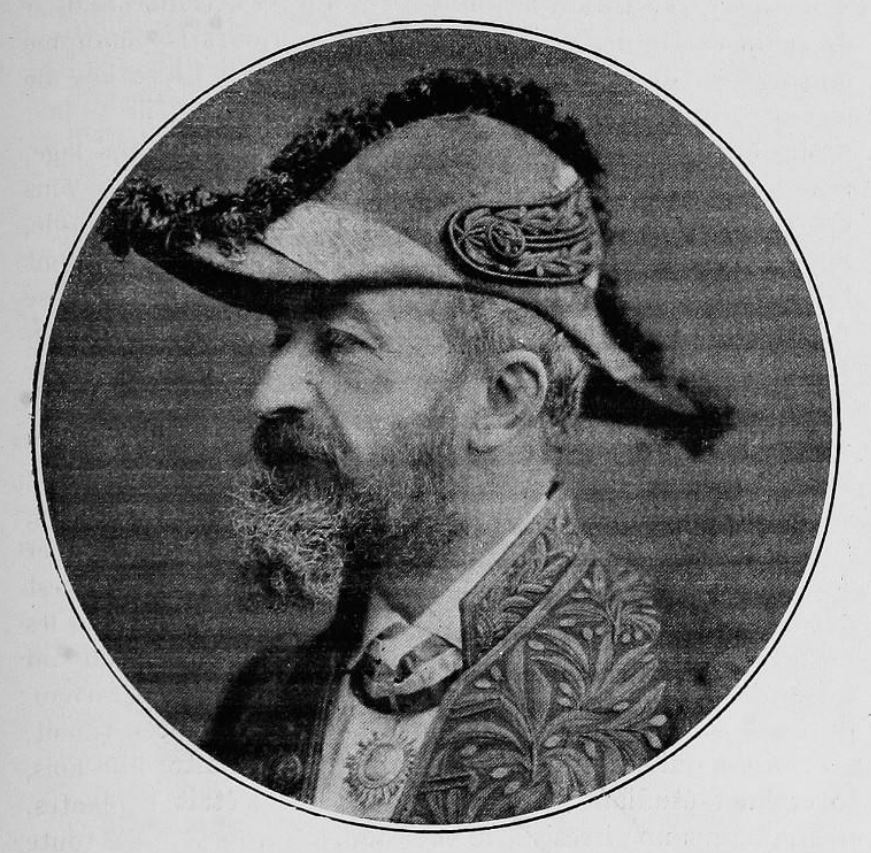
Achille Müntz

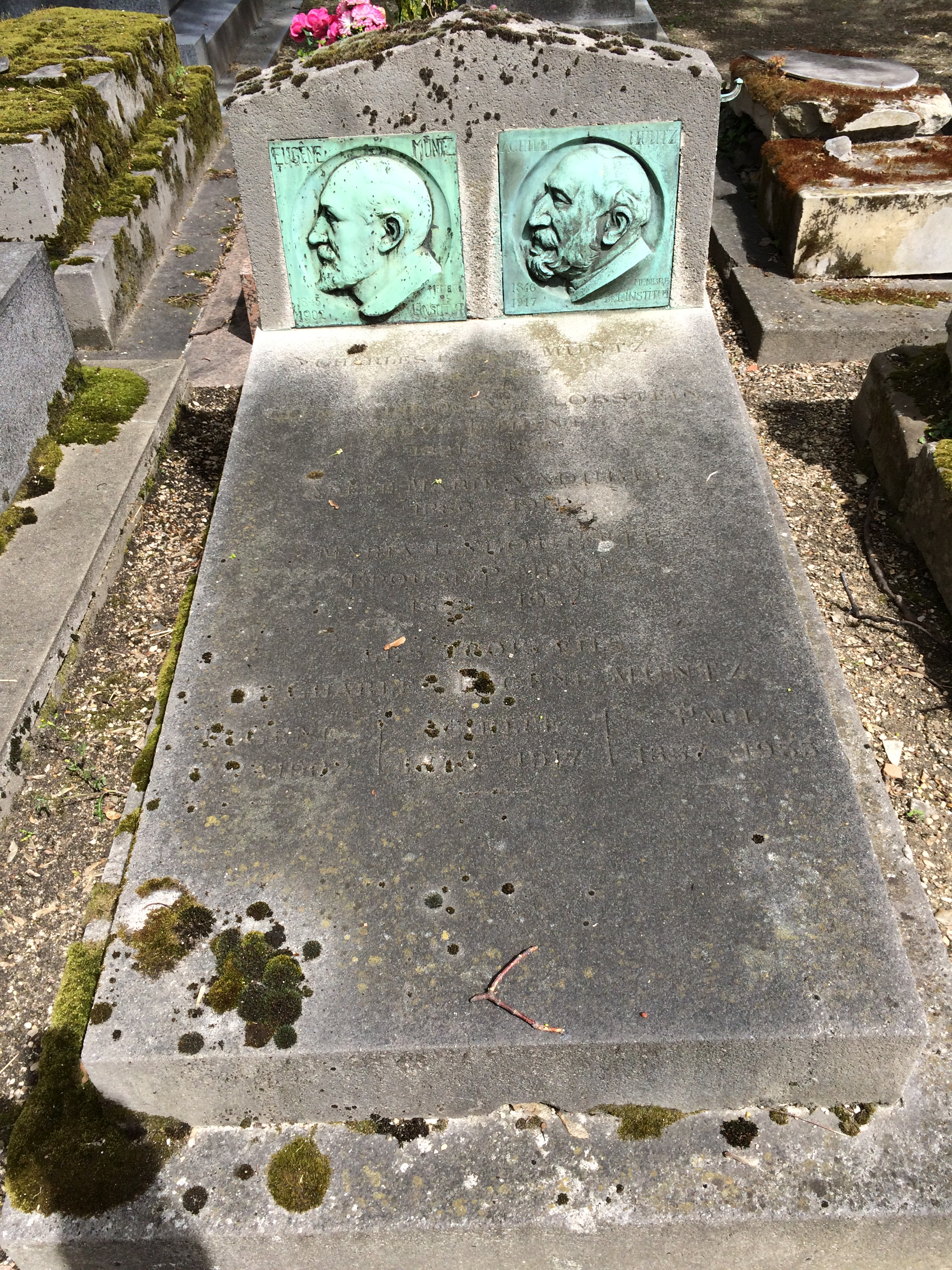
Grave of Achille Müntz in Montmartre cemetery (div. 23), in Paris XVIII

Charles Achille Müntz (10 August 1846 – 20 February 1917) was a French agricultural chemist.

== Biography ==
He was born at Soultz-sous-Forêts, Alsace, studied under Jean-Baptiste Boussingault in Paris, and, after acting as his assistant for ten years, succeeded him as director of the chemical laboratories in the Institut National Agronomique (1887–1914). From 1907 to 1914 he was also director of the research station for plant chemistry at Meudon (Collège de France). He was a member of the Académie des sciences (1896–1917) and the Académie d'Agriculture (from 1915).

Müntz made special research on the feeding of cattle and horses, and, following Boussingault's method, tested his theories by practice on great herds, on Parisian cab horses, and, in the case of his contributions to viniculture, in various vineyards. He served as director of the "Bibliothèque de l'Enseignement Agricole".

In 1877 together with Jean-Jacques Schloesing he proved that nitrification is indeed microbially mediated process.

He died in Paris.

== Writings ==
He published the results of his experiments in the Annales of the Agricultural Institute, and other chemical and agricultural journals, and wrote:

- Recherches sur l'alimentation des chevaux, with Antoine-Charles Girard (1884).
- Les engrais, ("On fertilizer"; 2 volumes, with Antoine-Charles Girard, 1888–91).
- Les vignes. Recherches expérimentales sur leur culture et leur exploitation, (1895).
- Recherches sur la nitrification intensive et l'établissement des nitrières à hauts rendements, ("Research on intensive nitrification and the establishment of niter beds for high yields, 1908).

== Family ==
He was a brother of the art critic Eugène Müntz.
