= Luigi Marchesi (painter) =

Italian painter (1825–1862)

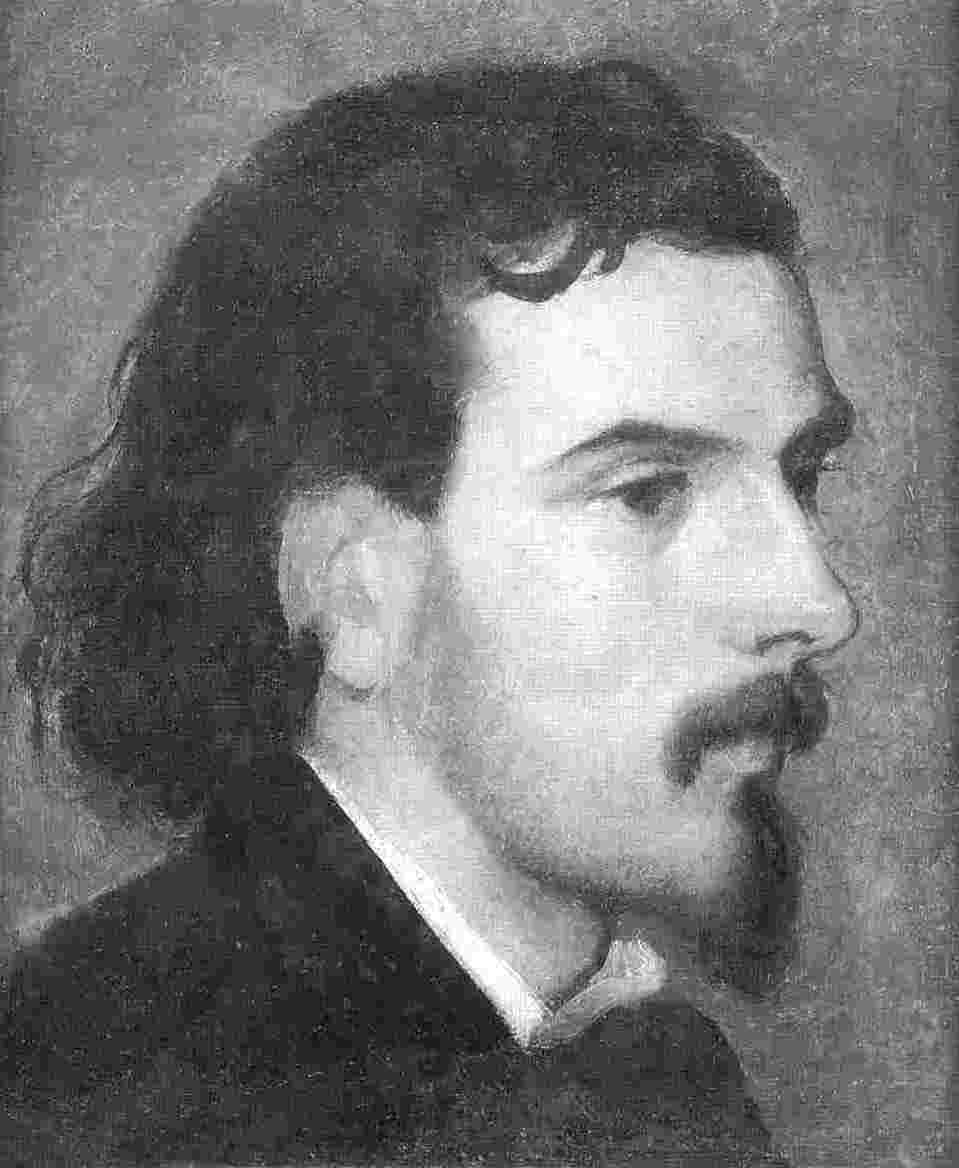
Self-portrait (c.1850)

Luigi Marchesi (Italian pronunciation: [luˈiːdʒi marˈkeːzi]; 6 November 1825, Roccabianca - 3 August 1862, Parma) was an Italian painter who specialized in architectural and interior scenes.

== Biography ==
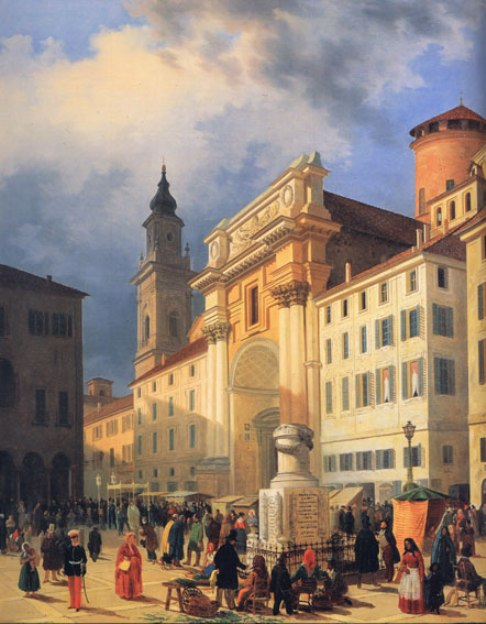
The main plaza in Parma, with the Altar of Friendship.

His father was an elementary school teacher. When he was eight, his family moved to Parma. At the age of twelve, he began to display an affinity for art and his father enrolled him at the Academy of Fine Arts, where he studied with the landscape painter, Giuseppe Boccaccio.

When he was only fifteen, he participated in the annual "Esposizione di quadri di Artisti del Paese", held at the Palazzo del Giardino. He contributed five paintings that caught the attention of Duchess Maria Louisa, who commissioned him to do a painting of the castle at Torrechiara. This was the first in a series of commissions that would continue until her death in 1847.

In 1845, he exhibited some paintings at the "Esposizione delle opere degli Artisti e dei Dilettanti" (Exposition of Works by Artists and Amateurs), held by the Brera Academy in Milan, where he presented "Interior of a Sacristy", the beginning of his fascination with depicting interior scenes. In 1847, he and Erminio Fanti (1821-1888), a former classmate from the Academy, tied for first prize at the "Gran Premio annuale di Paese". The prize was awarded to Fanti by a random drawing.

This left Marchesi feeling bitter, so he enlisted in the Army and fought in the First Italian War of Independence. At the front, he wrote to Paolo Toschi, Director of the Academy in Parma, hoping to get a recommendation that would enable him to become an official battle painter, but the war ended before this was accomplished.

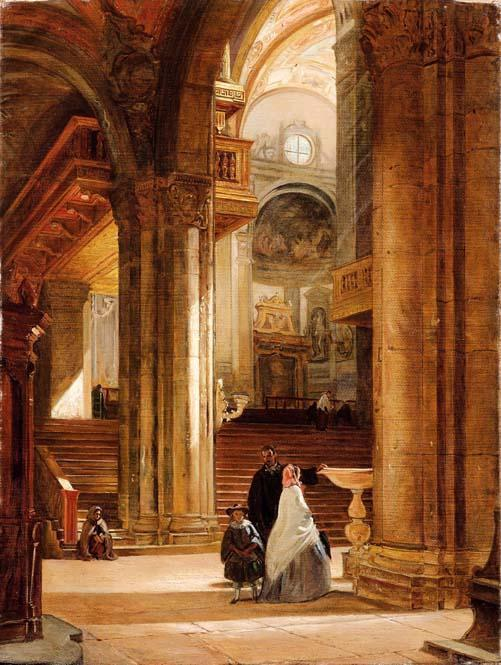
The Interior of Parma Cathedral.

After his return, he obtained a stipend from Duke Charles III to study in Rome and lived there from 1850 to 1852. It was then that his former teacher, Boccaccio, died and he was able to obtain the appointment to replace him, so he went back to Parma and remained in that position for ten years. The following year, he was married and began to display the symptoms of tuberculosis.

In 1861, he exhibited five paintings at the first "Esposizione nazionale di Firenze" (Florence), organized to celebrate the Risorgimento. His interior painting of the sacristy at the church of San Giovanni Evangelista received the only prize awarded to an artist from Parma. Later, he created decorations for the hallway of that church. Five of his works were selected for display at the 1862 International Exhibition in London. Shortly after, he died of his disease at the age of only thirty-seven.
