= Achille Ballière =

French architect

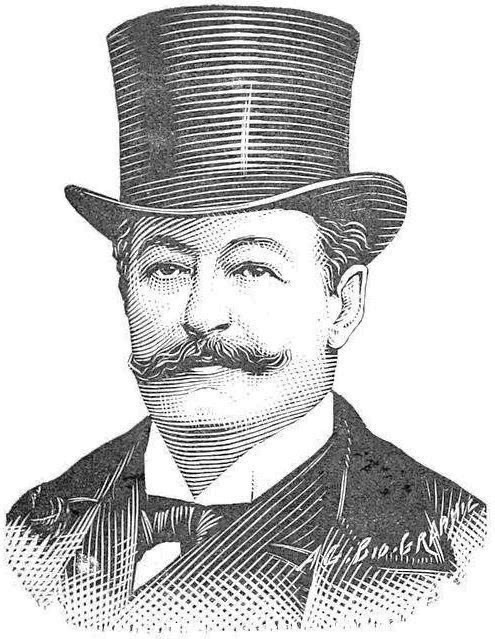
Balliere Achille Portrait

Édouard Achille Ballière (17 October 1840 – 4 November 1905) was a French architect.

Ballière attended the National School of Fine Arts with his sights set on a career in architecture. He participated in the construction of the Dôme des Invalides. In addition to being a Freemason, he was a republican who fought in the Franco-Prussian War, as part of the 173e bataillon. During the Paris Commune, he supported the Freemason attempt at mediation. However, he was arrested in his home on 18 June 1871, and was sentenced on 7 November 1871 to simple deportation. He was incarcerated at Satory camp at Fort d'Issy, before arriving at Fort Boyard and finally at Saint-Martin-de-Ré.

He boarded the Orne in January 1873 for the Isle of Pines, an island in New Caledonia to which simple deportees had been assigned. Ballière was authorised to go to Nouméa on 19 October 1874, where he found a vacancy for a bookkeeper at a lumber company. He also working on a theater project for Nouméa. On 20 March 1874 he escaped from Nouméa with other deportees, François Jourde and Charles Bastien, as well as some from fortified compounds, Henri Rochefort, Olivier Pain and Paschal Grousset.

He arrived in Australia and left his companions, preferring to wait for the Sydney Intercolonial Exhibition where his theater project for Nouméa was to be presented. He then went to Melbourne, from where he expected to travel to England. He arrived in England on 30 July.

After being pardoned, he was able to return to France and resume his work as an architect, which led him, among other things, to become the architect of the city of Thiers.

In the parliamentary elections of September 1889, he ran as a Boulangiste candidate in Draguignan, against the radical Clemenceau and another radical, a lawyer, Louis Martin. The latter withdrew after coming in second behind Clemenceau. Ballière, gracious in defeat, withdrew and did not appear in the second round.
