= Achille Ouy =

French philosopher and sociologist

Achille Ouy (1889—1959) was a French philosopher and sociologist.

Ouy taught philosophy at various lycees, and was involved with the Mercure de France. "A follower of René Worms and Gaston Richard, Ouy "performed many day-to-day tasks that held the R.I.S. and IIS together from 1919 to 1940."

== Works ==
- 'Paracelse, sa vie et son oeuvre', Revue internationale de sociologie, Vol. 27, Paris, 1919.
- Cahier d'études philosophiques, 1924
- 'Paul Szende', Revue Internationale de Sociologie, 1925, p. 79
- 'Nicholas Petrescu: The Principles of Comparative Sociology', Revue Internationale de Sociologie, Vol. 30, No. 5–6, 1925.
- 'René Worms (1869–1926)', Revue internationale de sociologie, Vol. 33 (1925), p. 577-580.
- Georges Duhamel, l'homme et l'œuvre. Les écrivains réunis, 1927.
- 'La méthode sociologique de Durkheim', Revue Internationale de Sociologie, Vol. 35 (1927), pp. 371–383
- Deux études d'esthétique sociologique, 1932
- 'Le scandale et la faute', Revue de Métaphysique et de Morale, Vol. 42, No. 1(1935), pp. 107–115
- 'Les sociologues et la sociologie', R. I. S., Vol. 47 (1939), pp. 245–75
- La Philosophie secrète des alchimistes, Ou le Secret de l'or des philosophes, 1942
