= Achille Locatelli (painter) =

Italian painter

Achille Locatelli (January 1, 1864 – June 20, 1948) was an Italian painter, mainly of landscapes, and writer of art biographies.

He was born in Almenno San Bartolomeo, Province of Bergamo. Among his works were Un paese del Bresciano, Pioggia, Crepuscolo, Diga sul Brembo, Una giornata d'inverno sul Brembo, Un effetto di sole and Antica rotonda di San Tommaso in Almenno. He was probably a relative of the culture writer, Giuseppe Locatelli (born 1856 in Bergamo), who was the father of the art critic Achille Locatelli Milesi (born 1883).
