= Achille Le Tonnelier de Breteuil =

French politician (1781–1864)

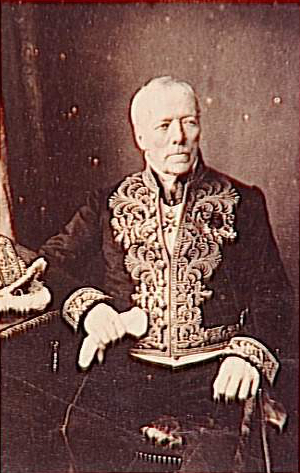
- Born: Achille-Charles-Stanislas-Émile Le Tonnelier de Breteuil; 29 March 1781; Paris, France
- Died: 3 June 1864 (aged 83); Paris, France
- Education: Collège du Plessis; École Polytechnique
- Occupation: Politician

Achille Le Tonnelier de Breteuil (1781–1864) was a French politician.

== Early life ==
Achille Le Tonnelier de Breteuil was born on 29 March 1781 in Paris. He was educated at the Collège du Plessis. He graduated from the École Polytechnique.

== Career ==
Breteuil started his career at the Ministry of Foreign Affairs, first in the cabinet and subsequently in Mainz and Stuttgart. He later served as an auditor in the Conseil d'État.

Breteuil served as the Prefect of Eure-et-Loir from 1820 to 1822, followed by Prefect of Sarthe and Gironde.

Breteuil joined the Senate in 1852.

== Death ==
Breteuil died on 3 June 1864 in Paris.
