= Achille Glisenti =

Italian painter (1848–1906)

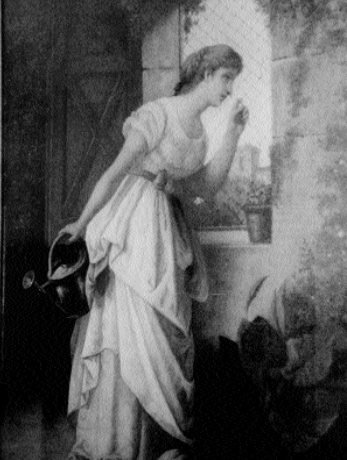
Woman with watering can at the window (1865-70), by Achille Glisenti

Achille Glisenti (October 1, 1848 – December 21, 1906) was an Italian painter, mostly of elegant genre and Orientalist subjects.

== Biography ==
He was born in Brescia and had his first training there under Luigi Campini. He then studied at the Brera Academy of Milan under Eleuterio Pagliano. In 1866 he fought with Garibaldi in the Third Italian War of Independence. He then traveled to Munich in Germany, where he made contact with former members of the Academy of Vienna who often painted in non-conventional styles, including Wilhelm von Dietz of the Munich school, Arnold Böcklin, and Richard Zimmermann and his brothers.

Glisenti returned to Florence to paint and open an antiquarian gallery. He often depicted scena galante in 17th-century garb as well as orientalist themes, which appealed to the American and British buyers. He was active in restoration of antique canvases. He also painted portraits including the King Umberto I and his wife. After the early 1880s, he lost vision due to an ophthalmic malady, and stopped painting.

In 2007–2008, an exhibition of his works was assembled in Brescia.
