= Achille Mapelli =

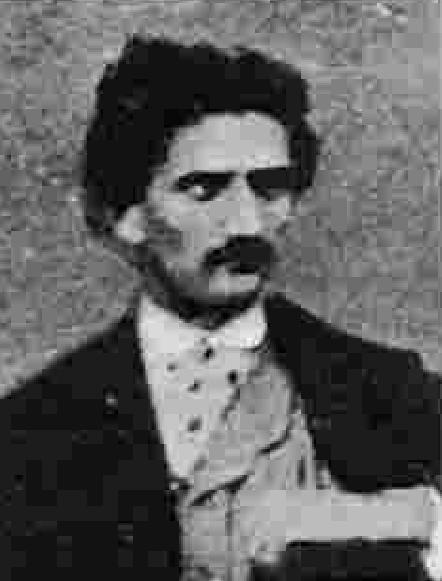

Deputy of the Kingdom of Italy

Personal details
- Education: Law degree
- Alma mater: University of Pavia
- Profession: Lawyer
- Website: Chamber of Deputies Kingdom

Achille Mapelli (Monza, 6 December 1840 – Monza, 3 December 1894) was an Italian politician, lawyer and journalist.

== Biography ==
Son of Defendente Mapelli, he was born in Monza on 6 December 1840. As a law student, he abandoned his university studies at the age of nineteen to enlist with Garibaldi and take part in the Expedition of the Thousand (May 1860).

In the official list of participants in the expedition, published in the Gazzetta Ufficiale del Regno d'Italia on 12 November 1878, he is listed as number 588. After the expedition, he returned to Monza and became a lawyer.

Driven by democratic and radical ideas, from 1866 he was involved in Monza's public administration as a city councilor and later as president of the Mutual Aid Society of Hatters.
Later, Achille Mapelli was elected as a deputy in the Italian Parliament representing the Monza constituency in the XVIII Legislature of the Kingdom of Italy. During his brief tenure in the Chamber, he did not have the opportunity to distinguish himself. During Giolitti's Ministry, he always supported the government's work.
He met Filippo Turati, with whom he became a correspondent for the events in Monza and the Brianza area. On 3 January 1889, he took over the direction of the newspaper "Il Lambro".

He died in Monza on 3 December 1894. He was buried in the San Gregorio cemetery, and a bust in bronze by Ernesto Bazzaro was placed on his grave. Over thirty years later, when the cemetery was closed, the bust was moved, as a cenotaph, to the new Monza Urban Cemetery.
The city of Monza commemorated him by naming a street in the city center after him and, in 1991, a Technical and Commercial Institute.

== See also ==
- Expedition of the Thousand
