= Achille Peretti (artist) =

Italian-American artist (1857–1923)

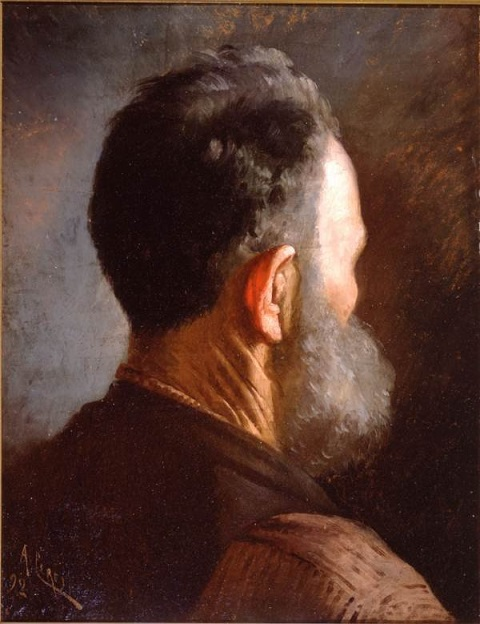
- Born: 1853 or 1857; Italy
- Died: 1923; Chicago, United States

Achille Peretti was an Italian-American painter.

== Biography ==
Peretti was born in 1853 or 1857 in Italy. He attended art school in Rome and Milan's Accademia di Belle Arti. Peretti emigrated to the United States in the early 1880s and settled in New Orleans in 1884, where he stayed through his last year. He became an American citizen in 1890 and died in Chicago in 1923.

Peretti painted in various formats and decorated churches in the Gulf Coast, New Orleans, and Chicago.

== Selected works ==
- Portrait of Hector Berlioz
- Portrait of an Elderly Lady
- The stampede, 1900
- Tree lined street
- Rooster and Chickens in the Barn
- Irish Channel Woman
