= Emanuele Mollica =

Italian painter

Emanuele Mollica (1820–1877) was an Italian painter, mainly of costume genre pieces and Neo-Pompeian themes.

He was born in Naples. Among his paintings are A music concert in Cicero's house in Pompei; Cicero in Pompei; and Pompeian Songstress (exhibited in 1877 at Naples); In the Triclinium at Pompei; Donna napolitano; and Un bagno a Pompei.
