= Achille Mollica =

Italian painter (1832–1885)

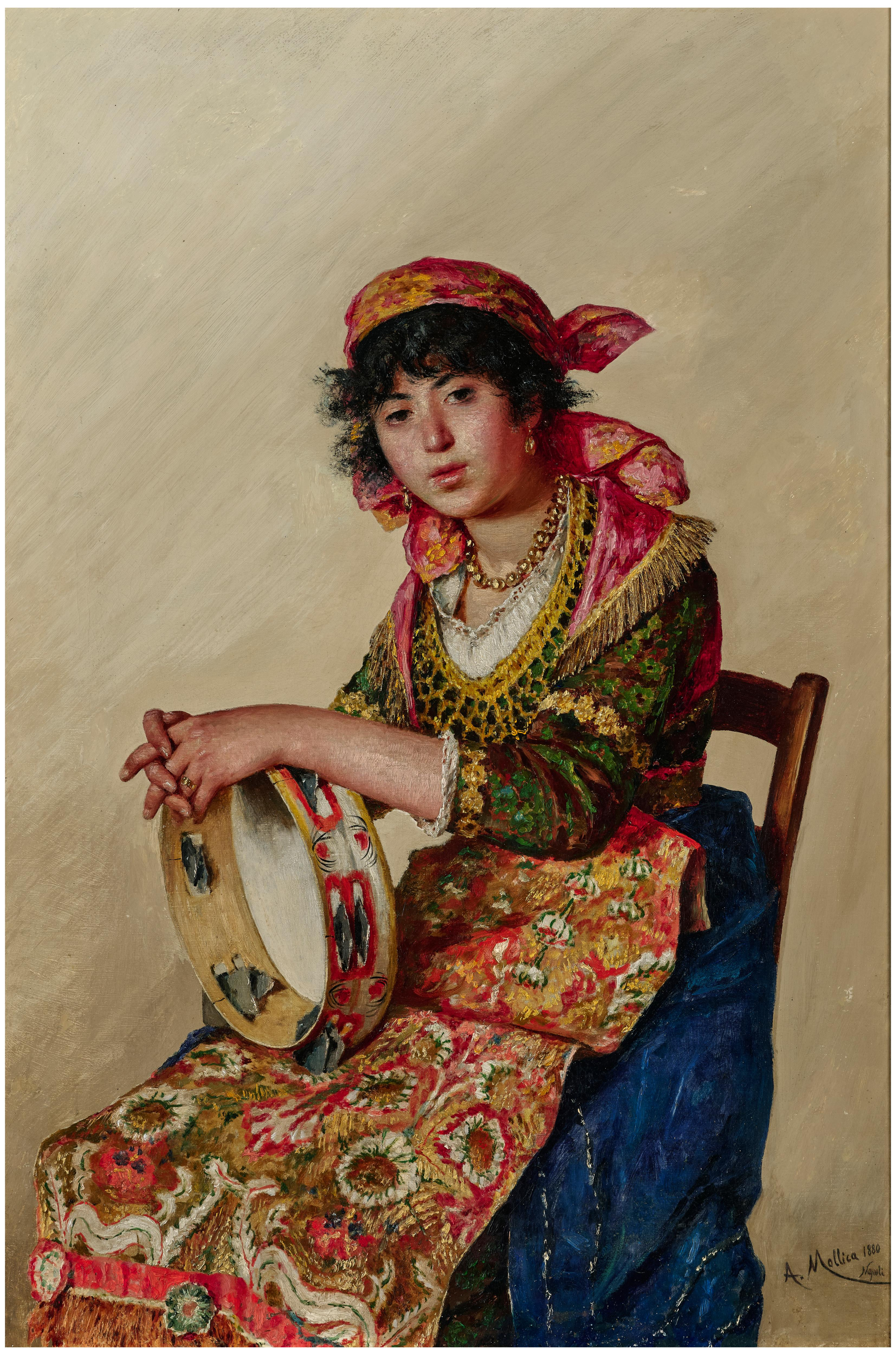
Neapolitean girl with tambourine (1880)

Achille Mollica (1832–1885) was an Italian painter of both canvases and ceramics.

== Biography ==
Achille was born to a family who manufactured maiolica ceramics. His father, Giovanni, had established the factory of "Mollica Ceramiche", which employed Achille's brothers, Ciro and Alessandro. Achille was however the greatest talent, studying ceramics at the Institute of Fine Arts of Naples.

He was a resident of Naples. In 1887 at Naples, he exhibited a terra-cotta Amphora; in 1880 at Turin he exhibited some paintings: Ritorno and Ricordi del ballo; in 1881 at Milan, he exhibited I primi bocconi; Zobeide, bello studio di testa; Clorinda, painted on maiolica; at Rome in 1883: Diversi amori; Prima di un convito : Scala a Posillipo, a Turin, in 1884: Amore e Veduta a Posillipo. He also completed many portraits. He also exhibited in 1874 at Naples: Un tunisino; in 1875, La pesca and in 1876, Lo scacciapensieri. He also participated in the 1988 Esposizione Italiana at London.
