= Achille Pierre Dionis du Séjour =

French astronomer and mathematician

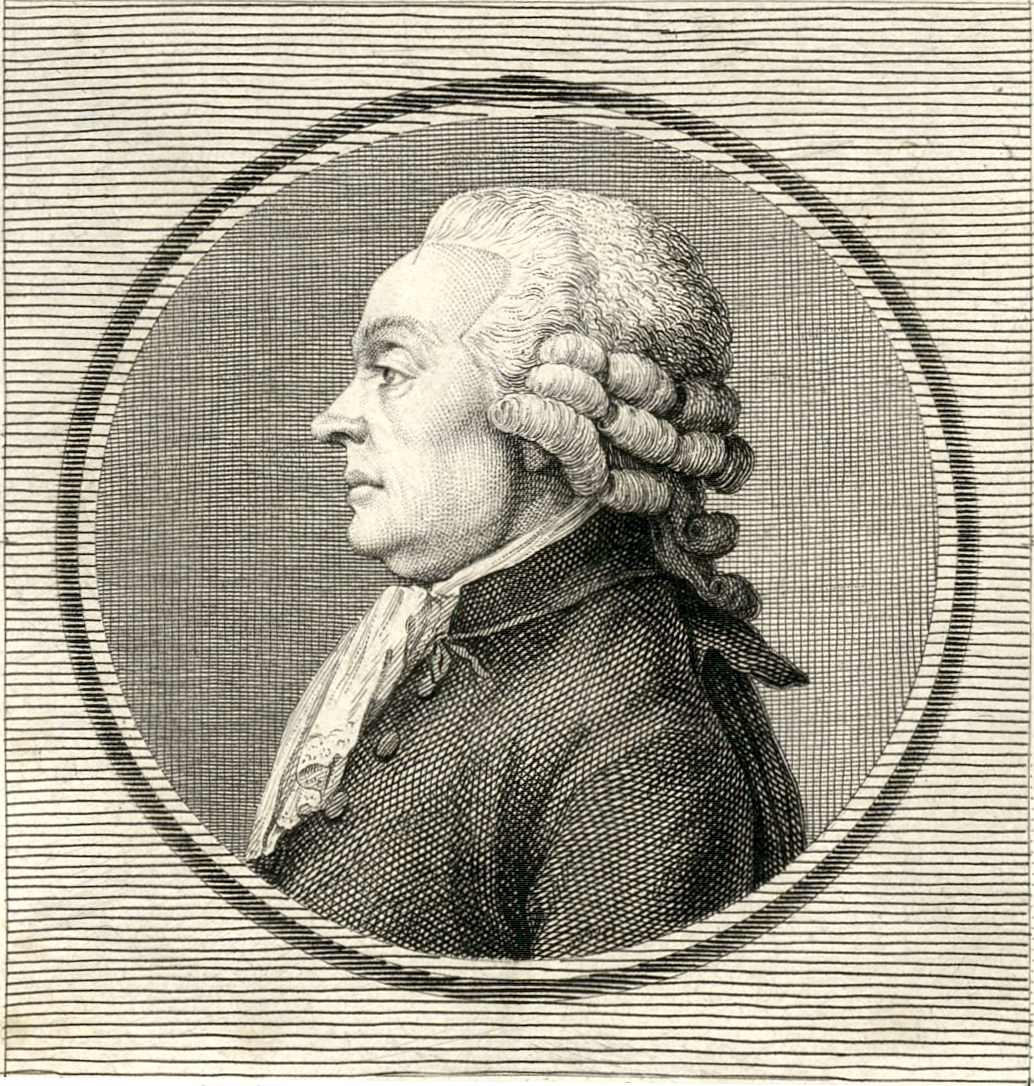
Dionis du Séjour

Achille Pierre Dionis du Séjour (January 11, 1734 – August 22, 1794) was a French astronomer and mathematician.

Dionis du Séjour was born in Paris and was a distant relative of surgeon and anatomist Pierre Dionis. He served as an advisor to parliament before he was appointed to the French Academy of Sciences in 1765. In 1775 he was elected a Fellow of the Royal Society. He was appointed to the Paris group for the Estates-General of 1789 and was one of the 47 who joined the Estates of the Realm that year.

Dionis du Séjour died in Vernou-la-Celle-sur-Seine.

== Publications ==
- Traité des courbes algébriques (Treatise on Algebraic Curves), with Mathieu-Bernard Goudin (1756)
- Recherches sur le gnomonique et les rétrogradations des planètes (Research on sundials and retrograde motions of Planets), (1761)
- Traité des mouvements apparents des corps célestes (Treatise on apparent retrograde motion of celestial bodies), (1774)
- Essai sur les comètes (Essay on comets) (1775)
- Essai sur les disparitions périodiques de l'anneau de Saturne (Essay on the periodic disappearance of the ring of Saturn), (1776)
