= Achille Beltrame =

Italian painter and illustrator (1871–1945)

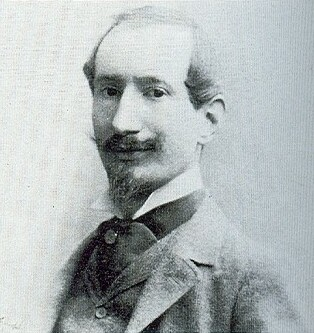
- Achille Beltrame
- Born: 18 March 1871; Arzignano, Vicenza, Kingdom of Italy
- Died: 19 February 1945 (aged 73); Milan, Kingdom of Italy
- Education: Brera Academy
- Known for: Painting, drawing
- Spouse: Giovanna Cocitto (m. 1907; died 1938)
- Parent(s): Giovanni Battista Beltrame and Teresa Beltrame (née Brusarosco)
- Awards: Mylius Prize; 1890 Fracta Virtus
- Patrons: Magno Magni

Achille Beltrame (18 March 1871 – 19 February 1945) was an Italian painter, illustrator and commercial artist. His name is indissolubly tied to the weekly La Domenica del Corriere, the covers of which he drew from the beginning weeks of the twentieth century to the closing weeks of World War II. Beltrame was the official cover-illustrator of La Domenica del Corriere until 1945. He was succeeded in this position by his disciple Walter Molino.

== Biography ==
Achille Beltrame was born in Arzignano, near Vicenza, Italy, on 19 March 1871 to Giovanni Battista and Teresa Brusarosco. As a child, he showed a propensity for drawing; he attended the Collegio Rossi in his hometown and from 1885 the Regia Scuola Tecnica of Vicenza. After completing middle school in 1886, he decided to continue his art studies and moved to Milan where he lived with his brother Oreste, a pharmacist at the Policlinico.

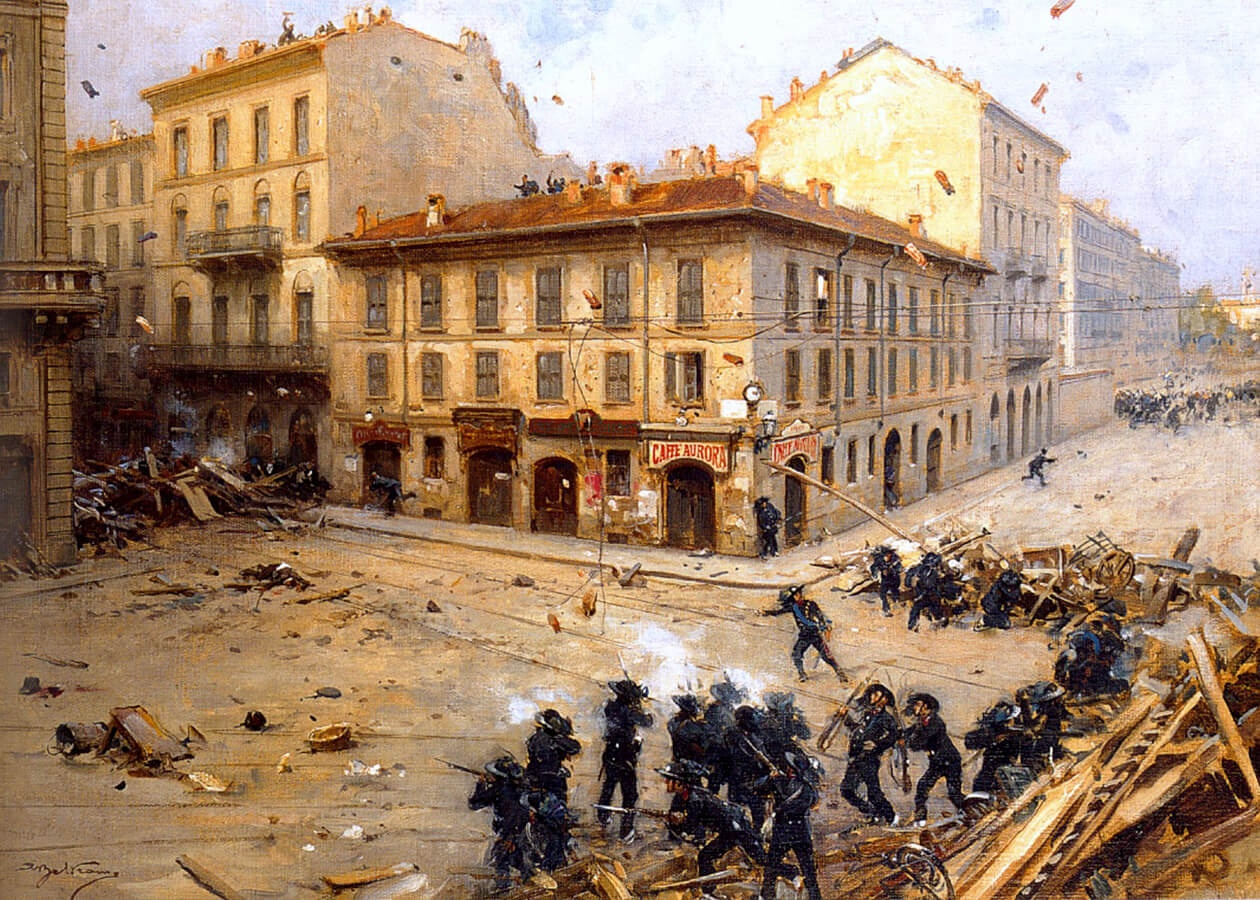
Achille Beltrame, Episodio dei moti rivoluzionari alla Foppa, circa 1900

He attended regular courses at the Brera Academy, gaining entry to the School of Nude Drawing in 1889-1890 and then studying painting with Giuseppe Bertini in the following year. In 1890, he won the Mylius Prize for historical landscape with the painting Fracta Virtus (Milan, Accademia di Belle Arti di Brera), shown the following year at the first Triennale di Brera together with Praeludium (private collection).

After having completed his studies in 1892, Beltrame rejoined his family, which had moved to Vicenza, and then returned to Milan the following year. In 1894, he won the Gavazzi competition at the second Triennale with the painting Canova che modella la Maddalena (lost at sea immediately after its purchase). He painted large canvases with historical subjects, and also completed a few more intimate works, such as portraits of his sisters (Mia sorella Argia, 1894, Arzignano, property of the Town) and of his fiancée Giovanna Cocitto, whom he had met a few years earlier (among these the pastels Giannina, c. 1893 and Ritratto di Giannina 1895, both in private collections).

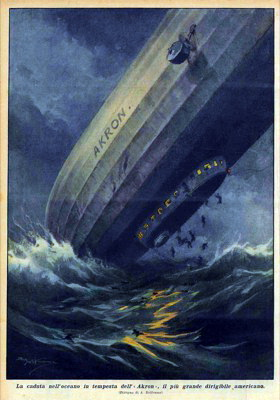
USS Akron disaster, La Domenica del Corriere, 5 April 1933

In 1896, he went to Cetinje to paint the portrait of Elena of Montenegro, the future Queen of Italy. There Beltrame was noticed by Eduardo Ximenes, artistic director of L'Illustrazione Italiana, who convinced him to go to work for the periodical as an illustrator. In 1897, he participated in the third Triennale and in 1898 in the Esposizione Nazionale of Turin. Thanks to his friendship with Magno Magni a businessman from Como, Beltrame received important commissions both as a painter (Ritratto di Edoardo Galbiati, 1894, Toscolano-Maderno, private collection, and Caccia con il falcone, 1907; for Villa Magni-Rizzoli) and as a graphic designer specializing in brand logos and posters. In 1899, he terminated his collaboration with L'Illustrazione Italiana and began to work for La Domenica del Corriere, the weekly supplement of the national daily Corriere della Sera, contributing substantially to its success. He drew the covers of La Domenica del Corriere for the next 45 years. From La Domenica's first issue in 1899 until he retired in 1944, Beltrame turned out 4,652 front and rear covers.

During the early 1900s, while he continued his career as a painter, his drawings were also in great demand for postcards, almanacs and publicity posters. During the same years he frequented the Società degli Artisti e Patriottica. He married his fiancée Giannina on 11 October 1907 and lived with her on via Milazzo 12 before moving to via Legnano 28 in 1910. Over this period, he painted the portraits of Cesarina Miani maritata Riva (1908) and of Antonio Biffi (1909). In 1911, with a few friends including painters Leonardo Bazzaro and Filippo Carcano, he founded the Associazione degli Acquarellisti Lombardi of which he became president. From 1912 to 1919 his contribution to La Domenica del Corriere also extended to the monthly La Lettura. In the following decade he painted murals for the Istituto Sieroterapico di Milano (La Scienza, 1925), for the Bernocchi plant in Legnano (La danza delle ore, 1927) and for the Milan branch of thie Società Generale Elettrica dell'Adamello (La Scienza e il Genio dominano le forze, 1929). He also continued to paint nature and city landscapes.

In the second half of the 1930s, he experienced a serious financial setback due to heavy losses in his investments in the stock market, and in 1938 suffered the loss of his wife.

In 1941, the Ranzini Gallery dedicated a retrospective exhibit to him; the next year, following the air-raids that also hit his studio, he moved to Bressana Bottarone in the province of Pavia. Beltrame continued to paint, inspired by the Pavia countryside, and to work as an illustrator for La Domenica del Corriere, until his last plate appearing on 26 November 1944.

== Critical reception ==
Beltrame died in Milan on February 19, 1945, covered with honors. Newspapers heralded his death with headlines like this one: "For 46 Years He Illustrated the World." At a time when the objectivity of the camera was gradually supplanting the news drawing, Beltrame, instead of giving a detached account of events (assassinations of crowned heads, shoot-outs between bandits and the forces of order, bloody strikes, earthquakes, shipwrecks, trench warfare, etc.), drew them as the public wanted them to appear, adding dignity and virility to the happenings. As writer Dino Buzzati observed in his preface to Trieste e il Carso, a collection of Beltrame's World War I drawings, the artist's truth, often objectively inaccurate, was "truer" than the camera's truth in that it gave the reality of movement where photography only recorded the immobility of things.

== Gallery ==
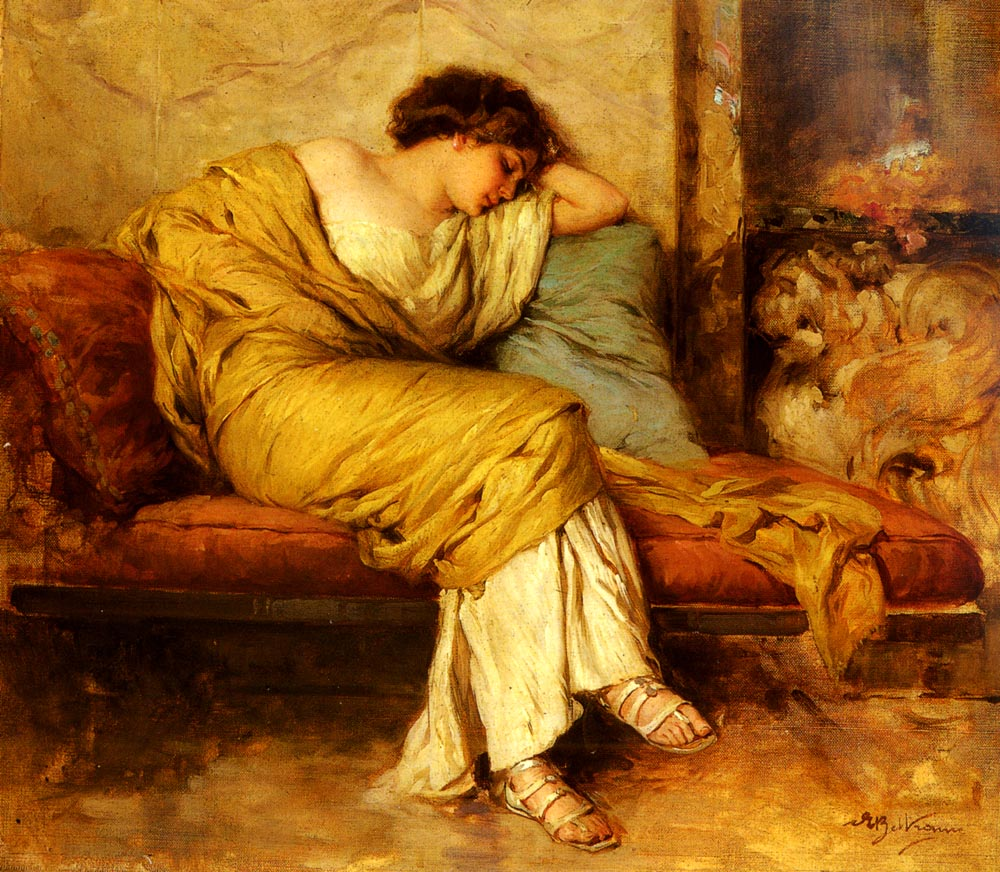
Figura dormiente (1899)

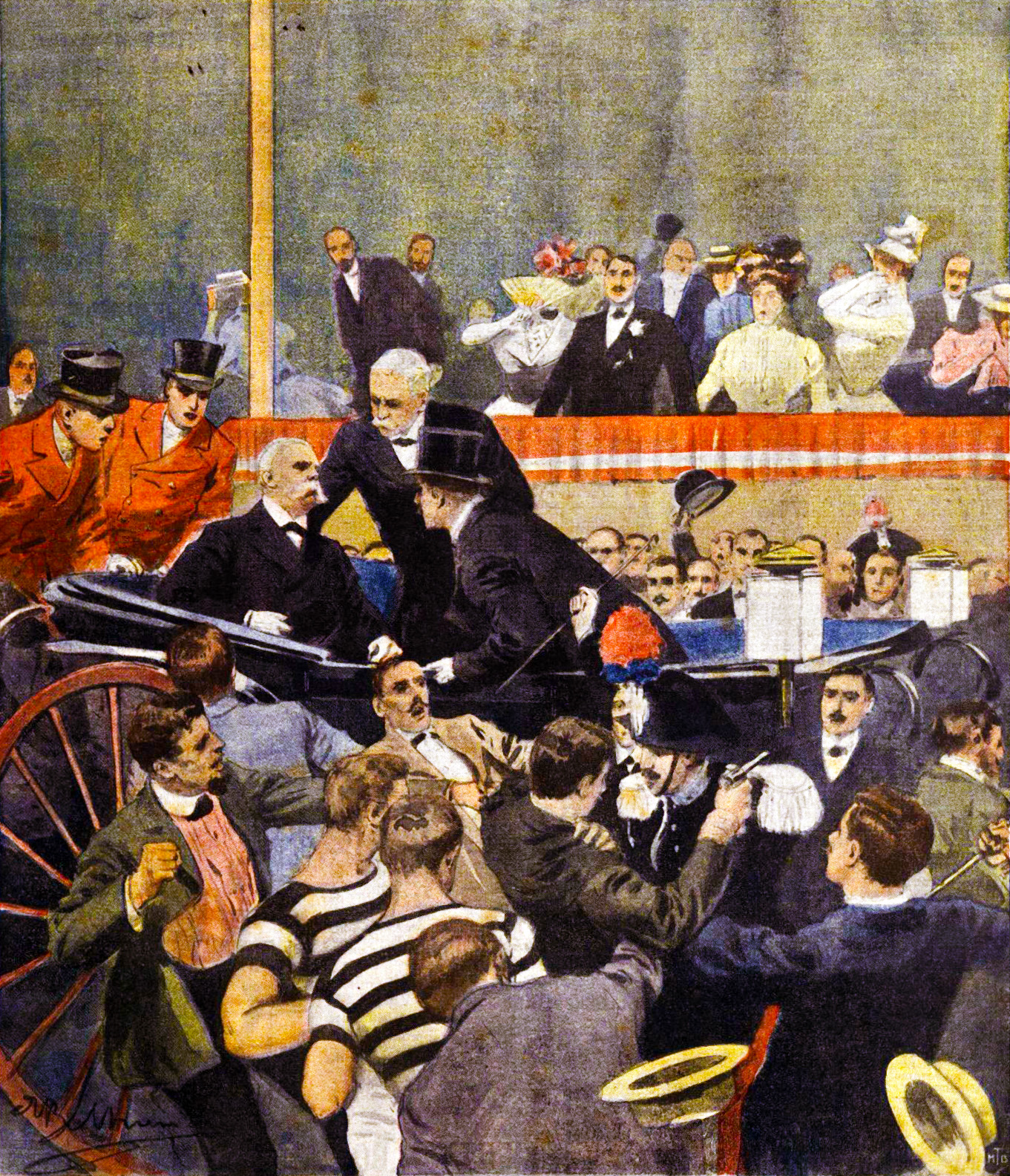
Gaetano Bresci assassinates Umberto I of Italy, cover of La Domenica del Corriere, 5 August 1900

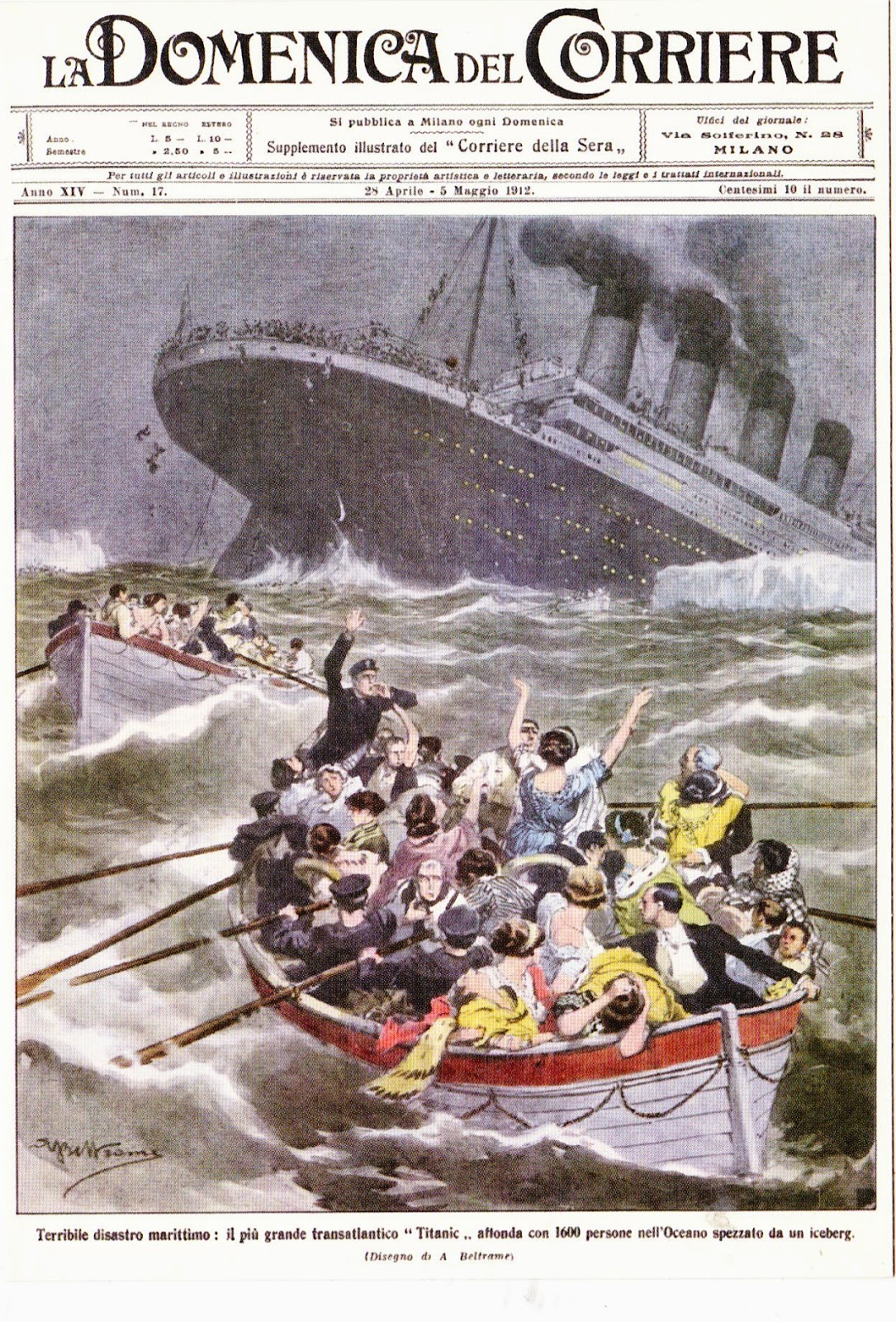
Sinking of the Titanic, cover of La Domenica del Corriere, 28 April 1912

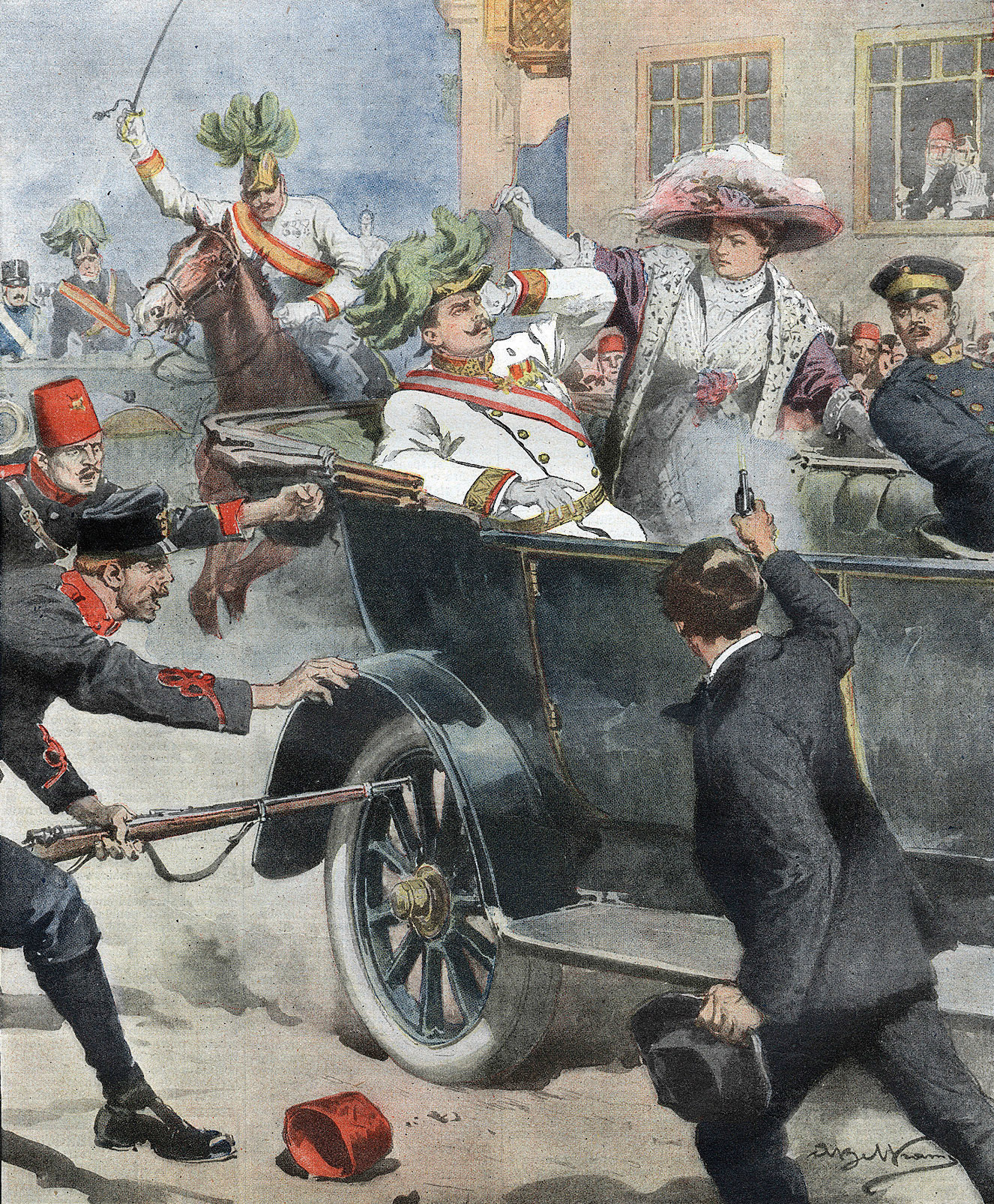
Assassination of Archduke Franz Ferdinand, cover of La Domenica del Corriere, 12 July 1914

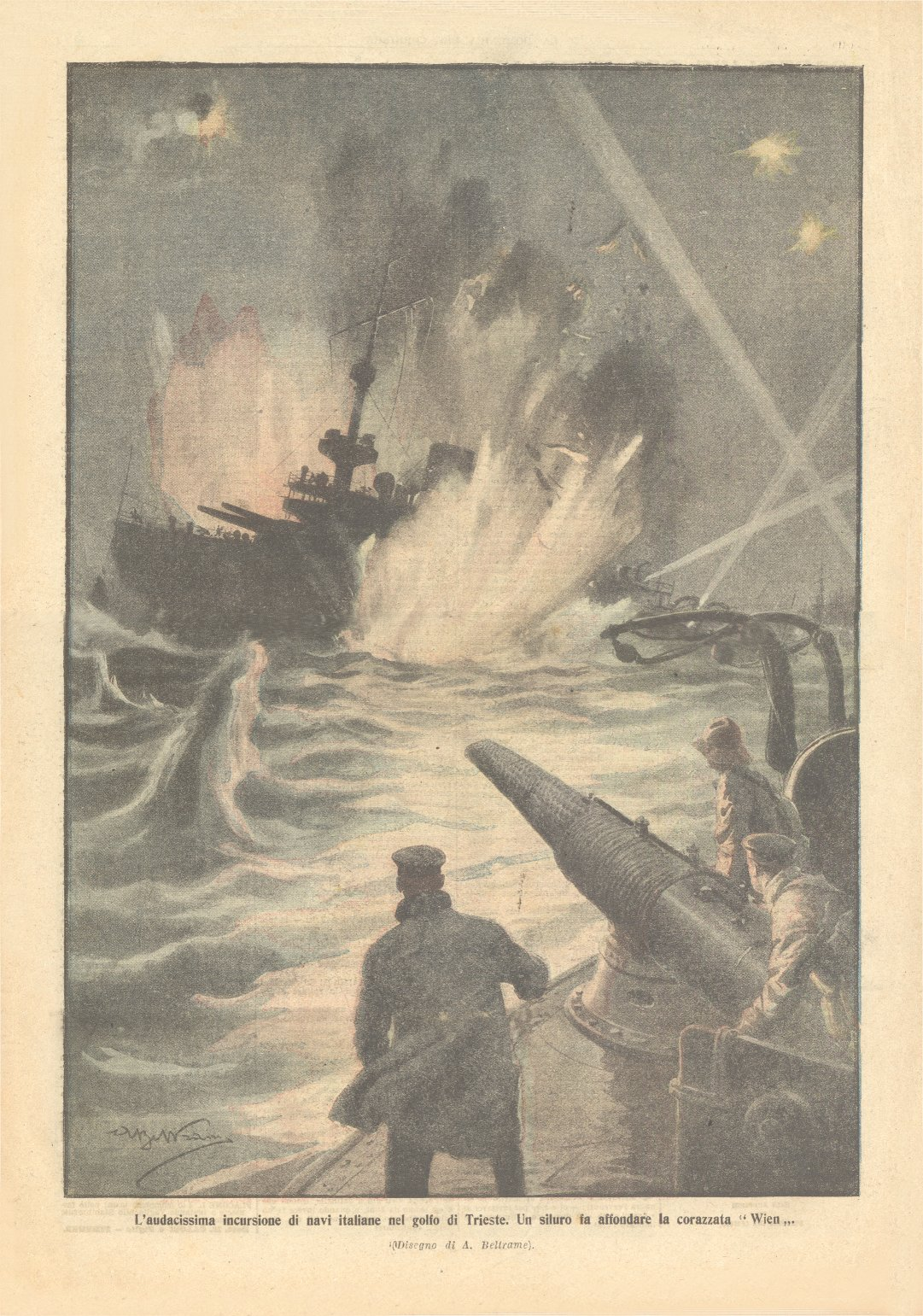
Sinking of the coastal defence ship SMS Wien, cover of La Domenica del Corriere, 1917

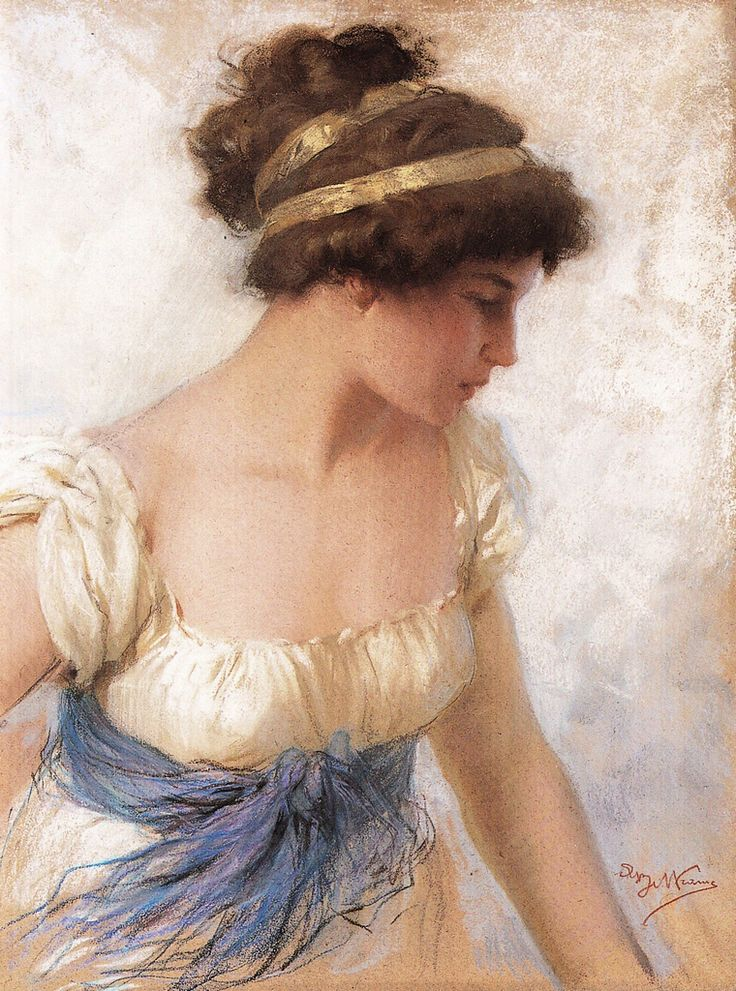
Portrait of a woman (1917)

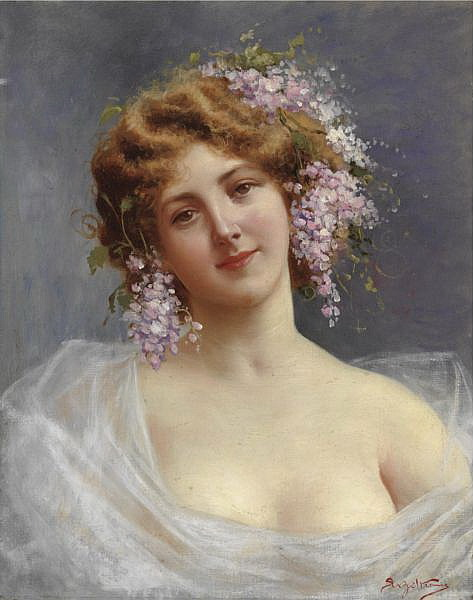
Fanciulla con lillà (1918)

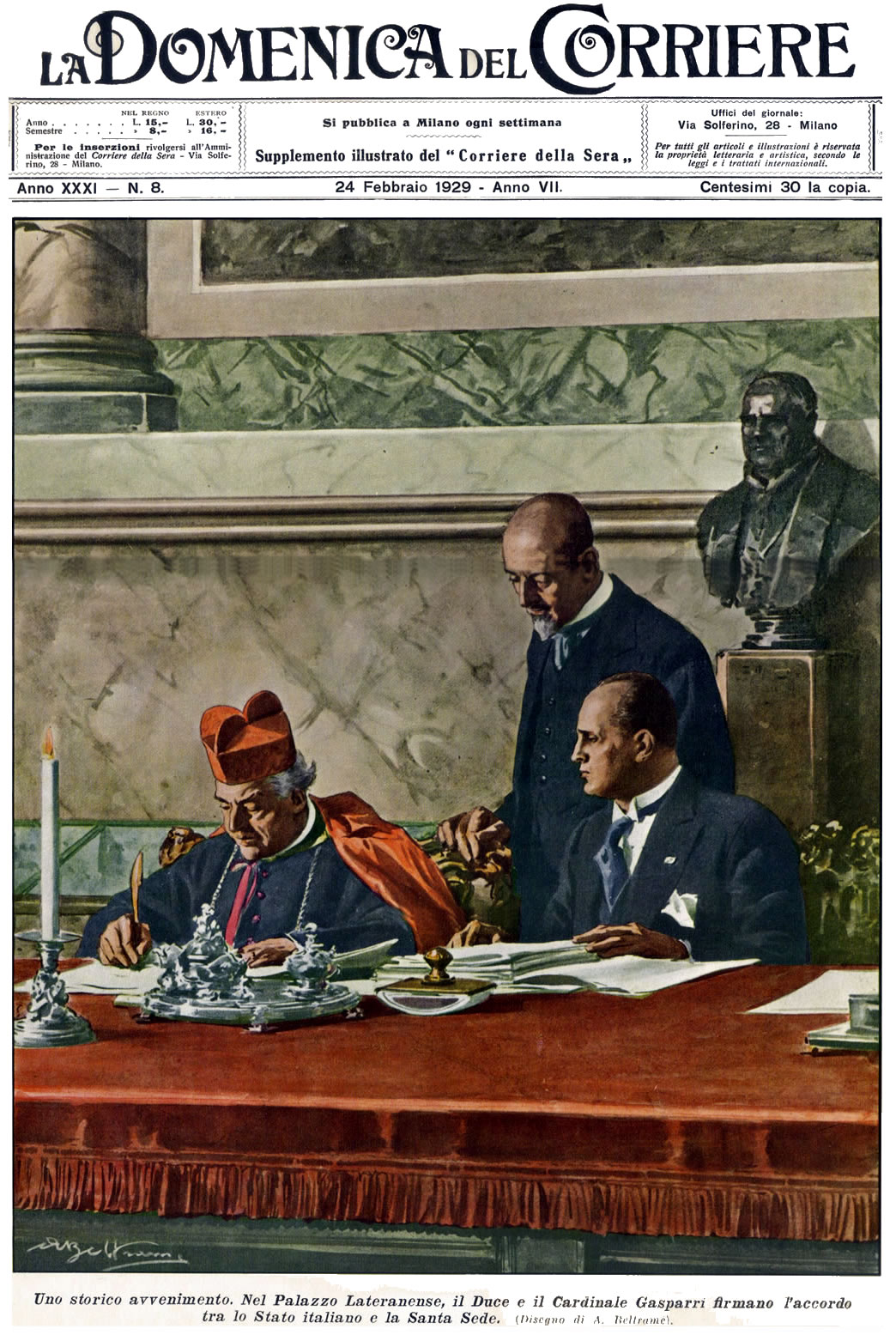
Signing of the Lateran Treaty, cover of La Domenica del Corriere, 24 February 1929

== Bibliography ==
- Buzzati, Dino; Zucconi, Guglielmo; Radius, Emilio (1968). Vanni Scheiwiller (ed.). Trieste e il Carso nelle tavole di Achille Beltrame dalla "Domenica del corriere" (1915-1918). Nuova Serie Illustrata. Milan: All'Insegna del Pesce d'Oro.
- Oliva, Gianni (2012). La Domenica del Corriere va alla guerra. Il 1915-18 nelle tavole di Achille Beltrame. Udine: Gaspari. ISBN 978-8875412784.
- Antonio Lora, ed. (2012). Achille Beltrame ad Arzignano. Catalogo dei dipinti della Collezione Municipale (PDF). Arzignano: Giavedoni. ISBN 978-8898176304. Archived from the original (PDF) on 2023-04-27.
- Lorenzi, Alberto (1966). "BELTRAME, Achille". Dizionario Biografico degli Italiani (in Italian). Vol. 8: Bellucci–Beregan. Rome: Istituto dell'Enciclopedia Italiana. ISBN 978-88-12-00032-6.
