= Carlo Cressini =

Italian painter (1864–1938)

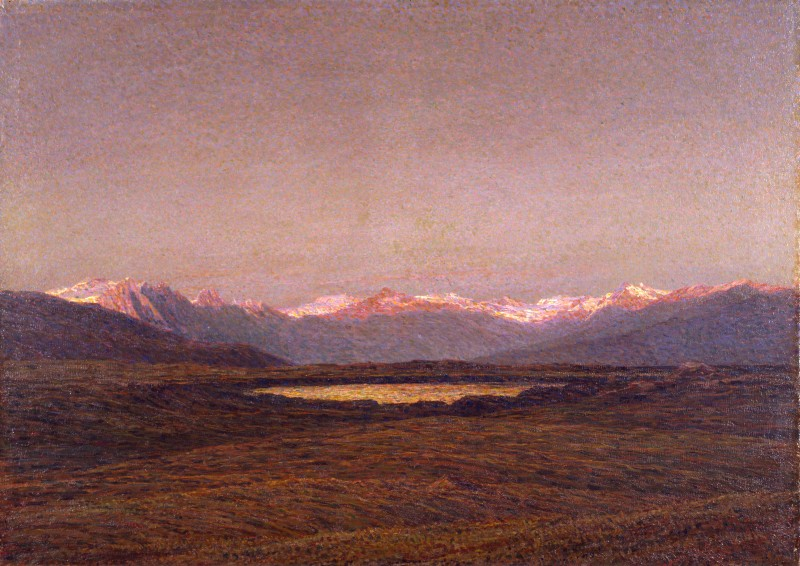
Tramonto sereno (Foscagno - Valtellina), 1920–25 (Fondazione Cariplo)

Carlo Cressini (1864–1938) was an Italian painter.

== Biography ==
Born in Genoa, Cressini moved to Milan with his family and then to Turin, where he enrolled at the Albertina Academy. He returned to Milan in 1884 in order to continue his studies at the Brera Academy, where he was taught by Giuseppe Bertini. A regular participant in the national exhibitions held in Milan and Turin as well as Venice in 1887, he presented work at the Venice Biennale in 1897, 1899 and 1914 as well as the editions of the period from 1920 to 1928. The early portraits and still lifes gave way to a focus on landscape painting in the 1890s under the influence of the naturalistic painter Filippo Carcano and drawing inspiration, like him, from the unspoilt areas of the Italian and Swiss Alps. He began to experiment with Divisionist painting around 1905 and continued in this vein until the last years of his career. He died in 1938 in Milan.

== Other projects ==
Media related to Carlo Cressini at Wikimedia Commons
