= Mylius Prize =

Premio Mylius
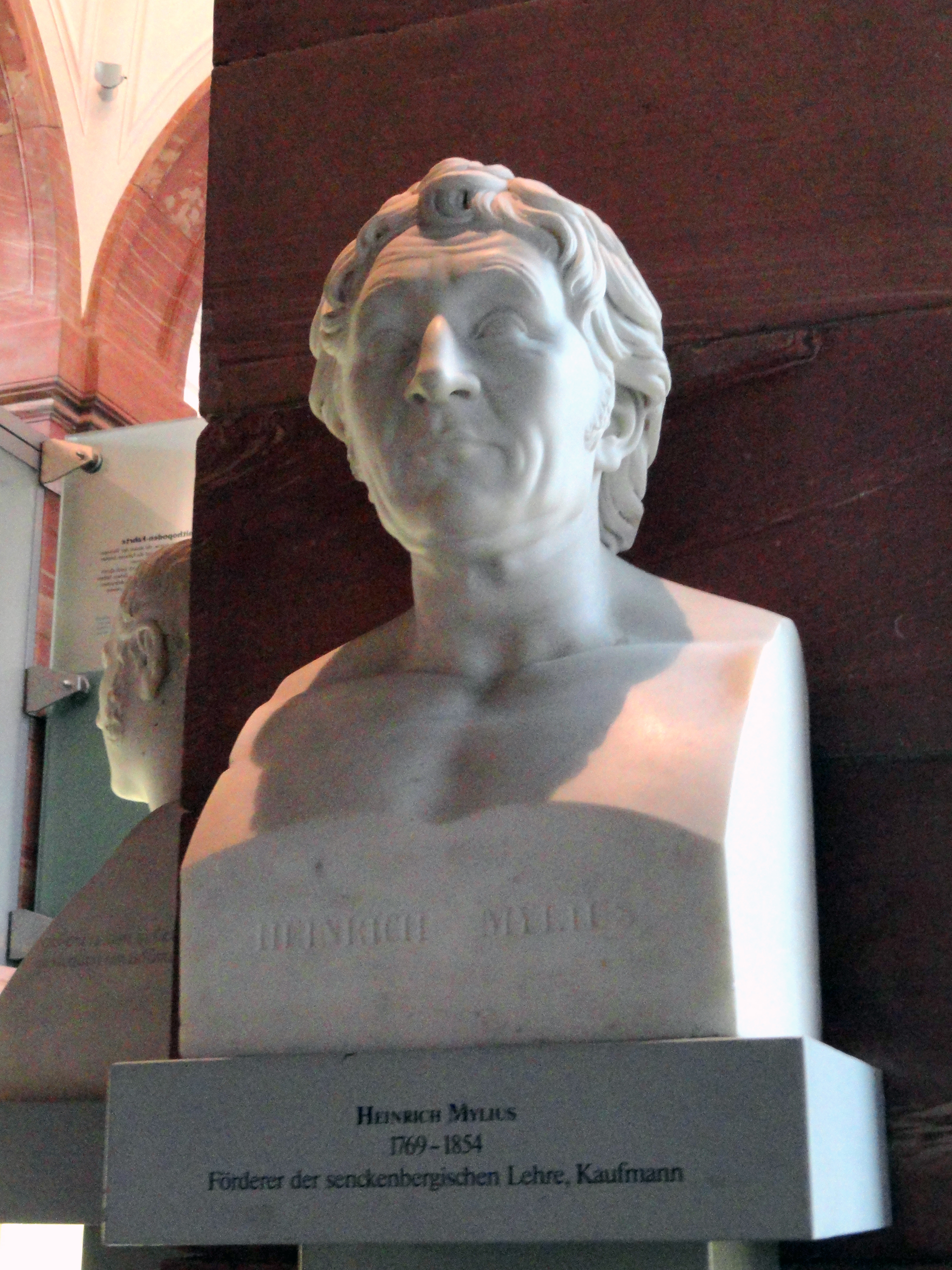
- Heinrich (Enrico) Mylius, founder of the prize
- Awarded for: art prize; awards for painting in oils and for fresco painting
- Date: 1841–1939
- Location: Milan, Lombardy
- Country: Italy
- Presented by: Accademia di Brera, Milan

The Premio Mylius was an Italian prize for painting. It was established by the Austrian industrialist Heinrich Mylius in 1841 and awarded by the Accademia di Brera in Milan, which at that time was under Habsburg rule. In 1856 there were two types of award, an annual prize of 700 Austrian lire for a painting in oils, and a biennial award of 1000 lire for fresco work. It was awarded until the outbreak of the Second World War.

Among the recipients of the award were Salvatore Mazza (1856), Pietro Michis (1868), Vespasiano Bignami (1869), Giovanni Battista Ferrari (1870), Filippo Carcano (1878), Giovanni Beltrami, (1884) Amerino Cagnoni (1886), Francesco Filippini (1890), Egidio Riva (1902), Donato Frisia (1920) and Trento Longaretti (1939).
