= Cagnoni =

Cagnoni is an Italian surname. Notable people with the surname include:

- Amerino Cagnoni (1853–1926), Italian painter
- Antonio Cagnoni (1828–1896), Italian composer
- Luca Cagnoni (born 2004), Canadian ice hockey player
- Romano Cagnoni (1935–2018), Italian photographer
