= Salvatore Mazza =

Italian painter (1819–1886)

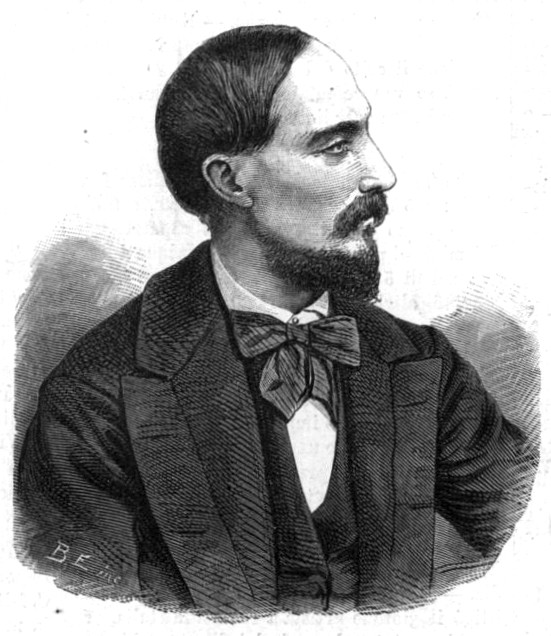
Salvatore Mazza in 1874

Salvatore Mazza (April 19, 1819 – October 24, 1886) was an Italian painter.

He was born and died in Milan. He graduated from studies in law in 1840, but instead dedicated himself to painting. He was influenced by Massimo d'Azeglio and painted mainly landscapes and animals.

He painted battle scenes in the Royal Palace of Milan; and the large canvas of the Universal Deluge. He won the Mylius Prize at the Brera Academy and a medal at the first National Exposition of Florence (1861). He published art criticism: Fantasie artistiche letterarie and Gite d' artista e Studio del vero. He was knighted into the Order of the Crown of Italy, and served as consigliere at the Brera Academy. He was an honorary associate at the Academy of Mantua and Urbino.
