= Umberto Bazzoli =

Italian painter (1860–1887)

Umberto Bazzoli (Verona, 1860 – after 1887) was an Italian painter, mainly of landscapes and portraits.

He first studied under Ercole Calvi; then traveled to study in Rome, Florence, and Milan. In the latter city, he studied at the Brera Academy under Filippo Carcano. At the 1887 Exhibition of Venice, he displayed four lauded canvases: Mountains of Bergamo; Sotto i faggi; Portrait, and Autumn Vespers. He also exhibited in Milan and Munich.
