= La Domenica del Corriere =

Italian weekly newspaper (1899–1989)

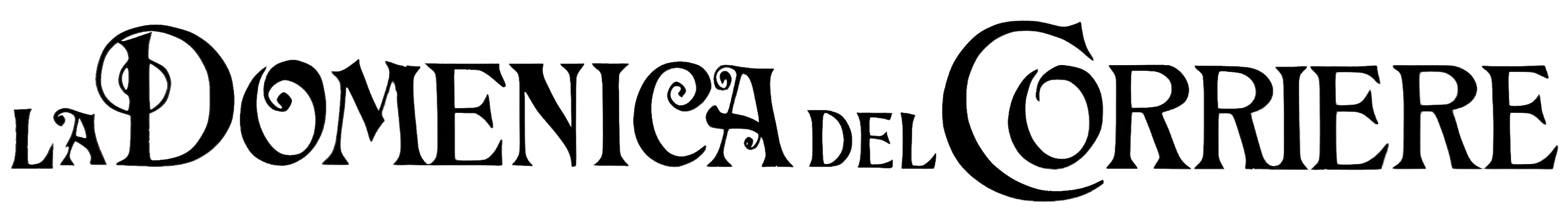

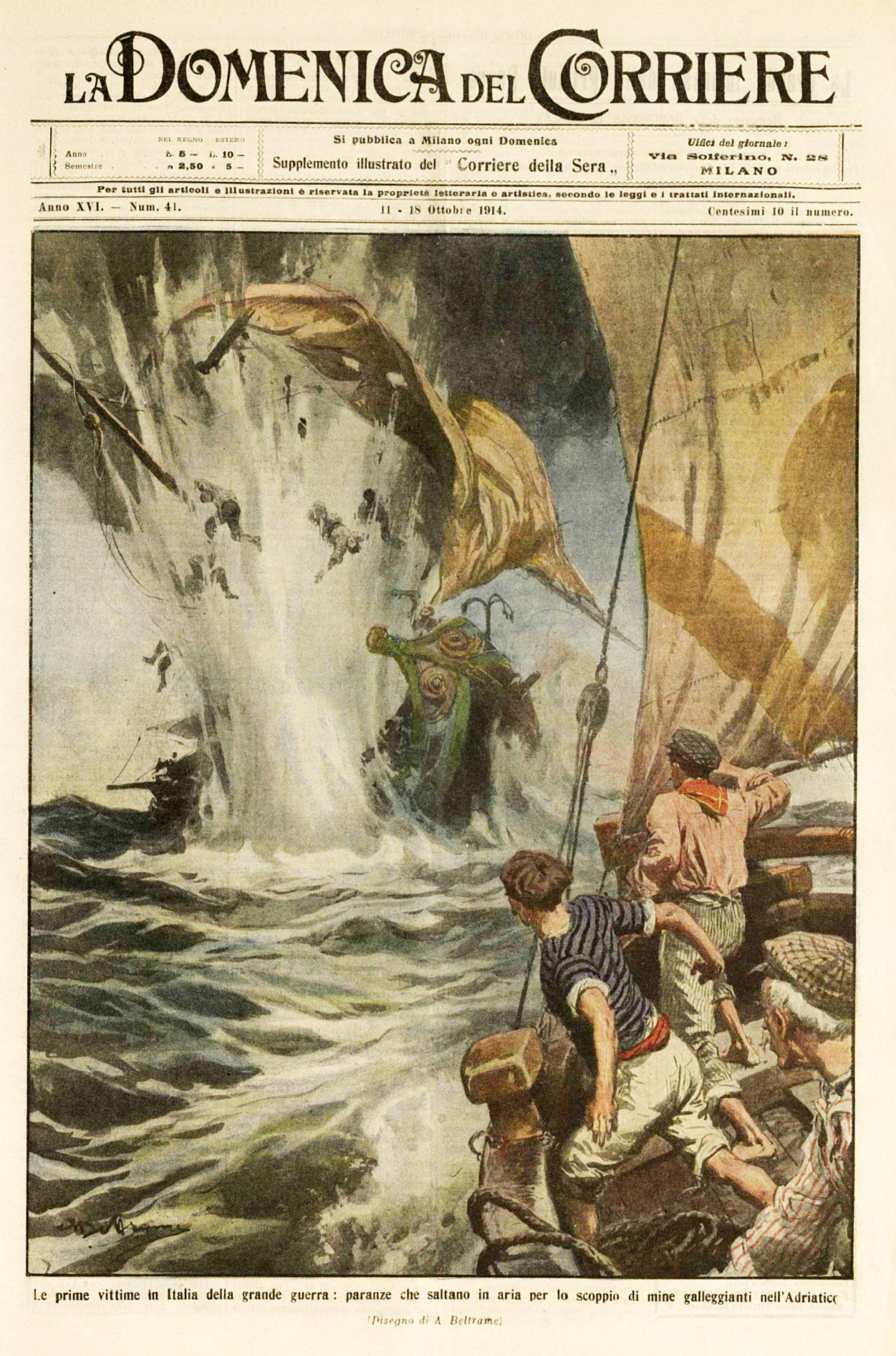
- Type: Weekly newspaper
- Founded: 1899
- Ceased publication: 1989
- Language: Italian
- Headquarters: Milan
- Country: Italy

La Domenica del Corriere (The Sunday Courier) was an Italian weekly newspaper which ran from 1899 to 1989. It came out every Sunday free with Corriere della Sera, but was also sold separately. It was famous for its cover drawings, and its issues are still collected. In the period between 1952 and 1953 its circulation was 900,000–1,000,000 copies.

== History ==
La Domenica del Corriere was founded in January 1899 as an illustrated supplement to Corriere della Sera. Modelled on the Sunday magazine La Tribuna Illustrata, it was printed in a large format and comprised 12 pages. It was distributed free with Corriere della Sera every Sunday, but could also be purchased separately. The front and back covers were always illustrated. Corriere employed the young illustrator Achille Beltrame to depict the most notable event of the week in each issue. Following Beltrame's death in 1945, Walter Molino took over, creating memorable covers in a similar style to his predecessor.

During the 1920s and 1930s, the magazine became a key source of information for the educated bourgeoisie and much of the literate Italian population. During this period, it became Italy's best-selling weekly magazine, with sales reaching 600,000 copies. However, beginning in the 1970s, competition from other weekly news magazines, such as L'Europeo, Panorama and L'Espresso, led to a crisis for the magazine.

Following several failed attempts to relaunch the paper in the 1970s and 1980s, La Domenica del Corriere ceased publication permanently in 1989. In January 2016, at the launch of the Corriere della Sera's new digital archive, it was announced that all issues of La Domenica del Corriere, Corriere dei Piccoli and La Lettura would be digitised.
