= Walter Molino =

Italian comics artist and illustrator

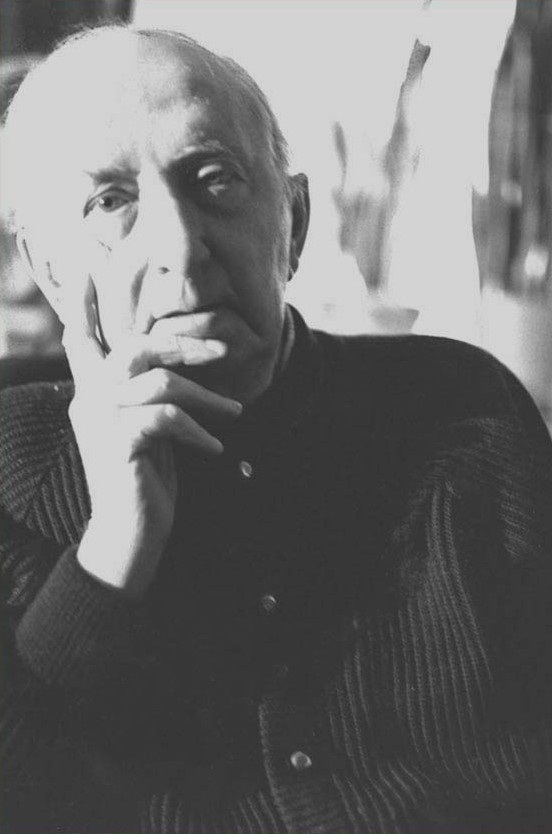
- Born: 5 November 1915; Reggio Emilia, Italy
- Died: 8 December 1997 (aged 82); Milan, Italy
- Occupations: Comics artist, illustrator

Walter Molino (5 November 1915 – 8 December 1997) was an Italian comics artist and illustrator.

== Life and career ==
Born in Reggio Emilia, Molino made his professional debut as illustrator and caricaturist in 1935, collaborating with the newspaper Il Popolo d'Italia and the children's magazines Il Monello and L'Intrepido. In 1936 he started working for the satirical magazine Bertoldo, and in 1938 he debuted as a comic artist with the series Virus, il mago della Foresta Morta, with texts of Federico Pedrocchi.Still with Pedrocchi he created the comics series Capitan l'Audace for the magazine L'Audace, Maschera Bianca, and a number of other characters.

Since 1941 Molino became the official cover-illustrator of La Domenica del Corriere, succeeding Achille Beltrame. Molino's covers for Domenica del Corriere are infamous for their gruesome depictions of horrific accidents. He also collaborated with the women's magazine Grand Hotel, as cover-illustrator and artist of "cineromanzi", i.e. comic stories, generally of romantic or melodramatic genre, whose comic characters resembled famous film actors.

In 2020, his illustration of a speculative "Singoletta" vehicle from a December 1962 article in La Domenica del Corriere went viral due to it being seen as a solution for social distancing. Erroneously, it's frequently cited as a depiction of the year 2022 when the original illustration gives no exact date.
