= Donato Frisia =

Italian painter (1883–1953)

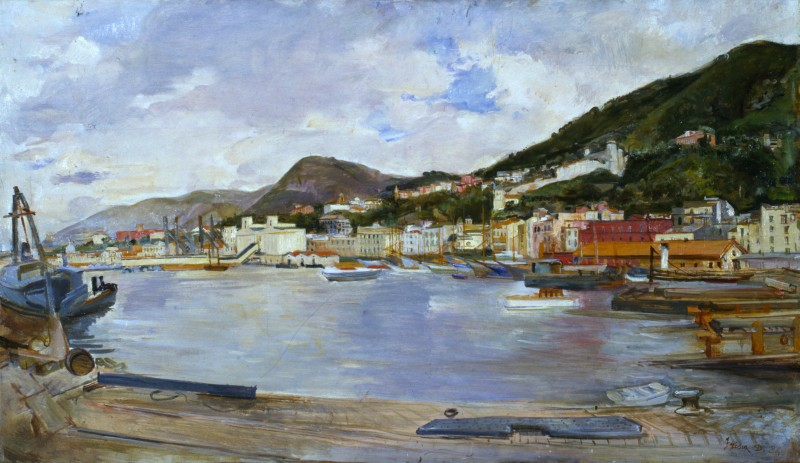
Castellammare, 1934 (Fondazione Cariplo)

Donato Frisia (30 August 1883 – 13 December 1953) was an Italian painter.

== Biography ==
Frisia was born in Merate, Italy. He studied at the Brera Academy in Milan from 1905 to 1910. He was one of Emilio Gola’s circle of friends and took part in the Esposizione Nazionale di Belle Arti at the Società per le Belle Arti ed Esposizione Permanente di Milano for the first time in 1910. Noted for his execution of funerary monuments, he focused primarily in painting on landscapes and still lifes. His participation in the Venice Biennale began with the 11th Esposizione Internazionale d’Arte della Città di Venezia in 1914 and included a personal room at the 23rd Esposizione Internazionale di Venezia in 1942. After serving in World War I he made numerous journeys, above all to Paris. He was awarded the Mylius Prize by the Milan Academy of Fine Arts in 1921 and the Prince Umberto Prize in 1922. His travels continued in the 1930s, including trips to North Africa.

He died in Merate.
