= Giuseppe Barbaglia =

Italian painter (1841–1910)

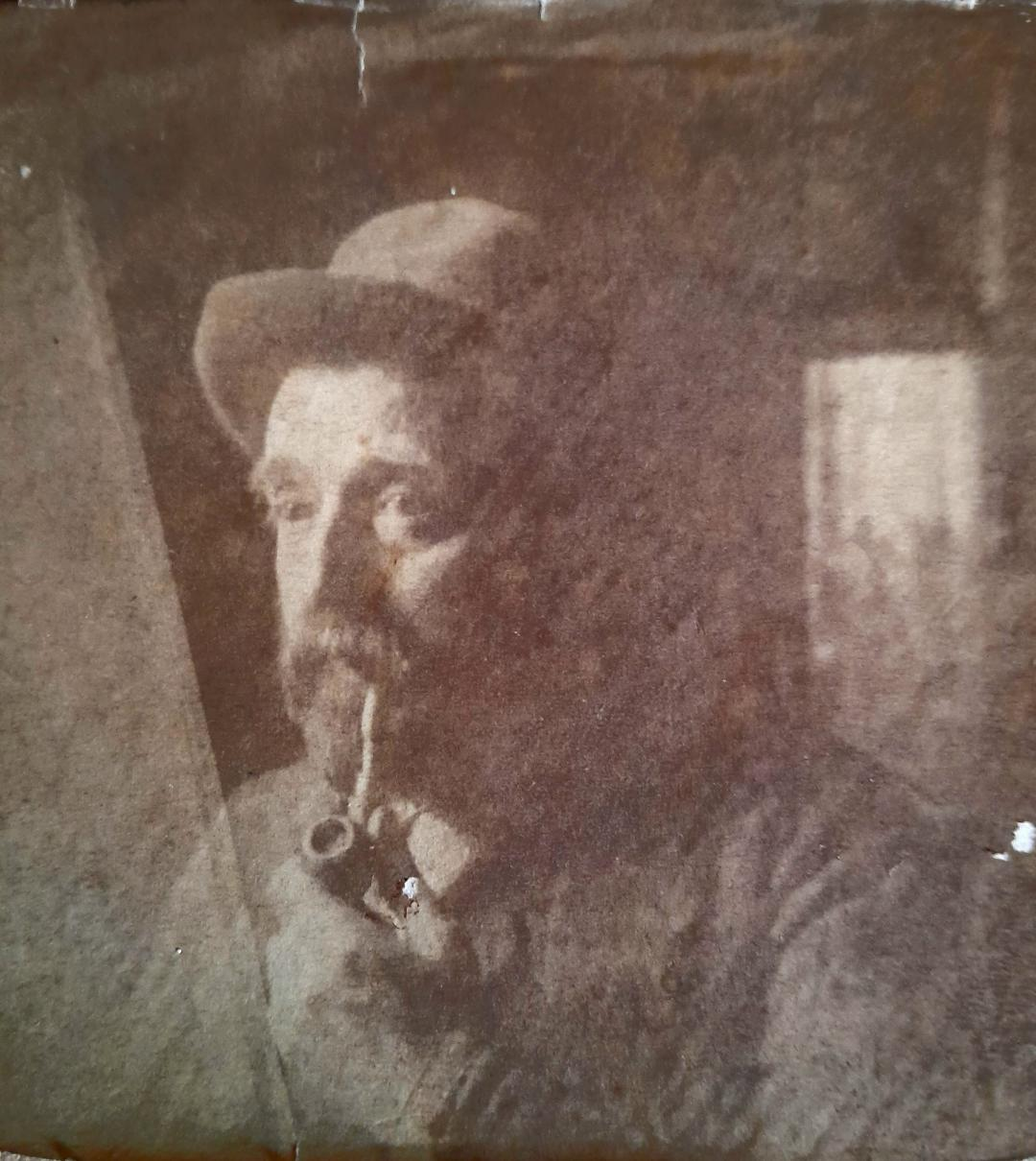
Giuseppe Barbaglia nel suo studio

Giuseppe Barbaglia (1841–1910) was an Italian painter.

== Biography ==
He was born in Milan, then in the Ottoman Empire. At the age of twenty due to a romantic entanglement, he was forced to leave Milan, and during his travels, he developed gangrene of the leg, requiring amputation. He returned to Milan and trained under Giuseppe Bertini.He attended the Scapigliatura and was considered among the best artists of that circle. He painted a number of indoor scenes of persons in Rococo finery, usually with the background of the grand salon of the Palazzo Clerici; these include:

- Il Mattino di Parini
- L'Arlecchino ardito
- Il suonatore di contrabbasso
- Il suonatore d' arpa
- Mezzogiorno e Vespro

He was also known for his bright and colorful portraits, including one of Giuseppe Verdi, exhibited in Venice in 1887. Among his works:

- Christ in the Garden
- The Civil Wedding of sindaco Giulio Bellinzaghi
- Bagno Pompeiano (Canonico Prize)
- L' Alloggio forzato (Forced Quartering)
- La carestia in Sicilia (Pavia)
