= Francesco Filippini =

Italian painter (1853–1895)

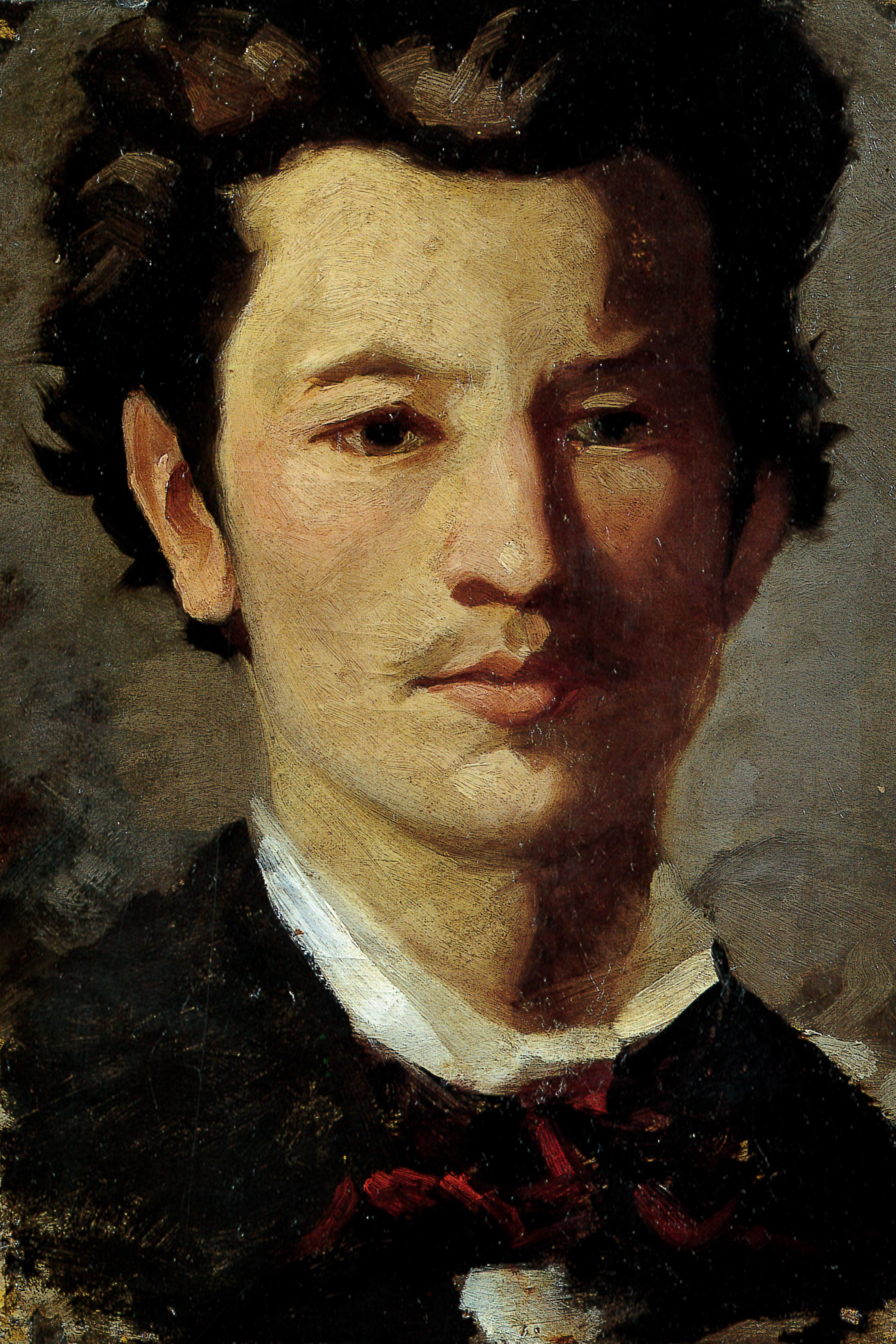
- Self-portrait (c.1875)
- Born: 18 September 1853; Brescia, Austrian Empire
- Died: 6 March 1895 (aged 41); Milan, Italy
- Education: Pinacoteca Tosio; Giuseppe Bertini
- Movement: Scapigliatura
- Awards: Fumagalli Prize (1887); Mylius Prize (1890); Canoninca Prize (1889)

Francesco Filippini (18 September 1853 – 6 March 1895) was an Italian painter from Lombardy. He was much influenced by Tranquillo Cremona.

== Life ==
Filippini was born into a poor family on 18 September 1853 in Brescia, in Lombardy, which at that time was in the Austrian Empire. His father Lorenzo was a carpenter, his mother Silvia Signoria a seamstress. He was soon sent to work, first as a waiter in a pastry shop, later as a clerk to a notary public.

He attended the school of drawing at the Pinacoteca Tosio; from 1872 he received a grant from the city council to continue these studies. In 1875 he received an allowance to study under Giuseppe Bertini in Milan. In 1879 another grant allowed him to travel to Paris to visit the Salon.

Filippini exhibited at the annual shows of the Accademia di Belle Arti di Brera in Milan from 1879, and from 1880 lived in that city. He made his living by teaching, both in schools and privately. He was made an honorary member of the Accademia di Brera in 1878.

He died in Milan on 6 March 1895.

== Work ==
When young, Filippini painted mostly religious or historical subjects, as well as some portraits. In later life he painted mostly landscapes – of the Apennines, of Pegli, of Porto Valtravaglia, of the Val Camonica or of the Valle Seriana – or seascapes in Chioggia, Genova, Naples or Venice. His work shows the influence of the Scapigliatura painter Tranquillo Cremona.

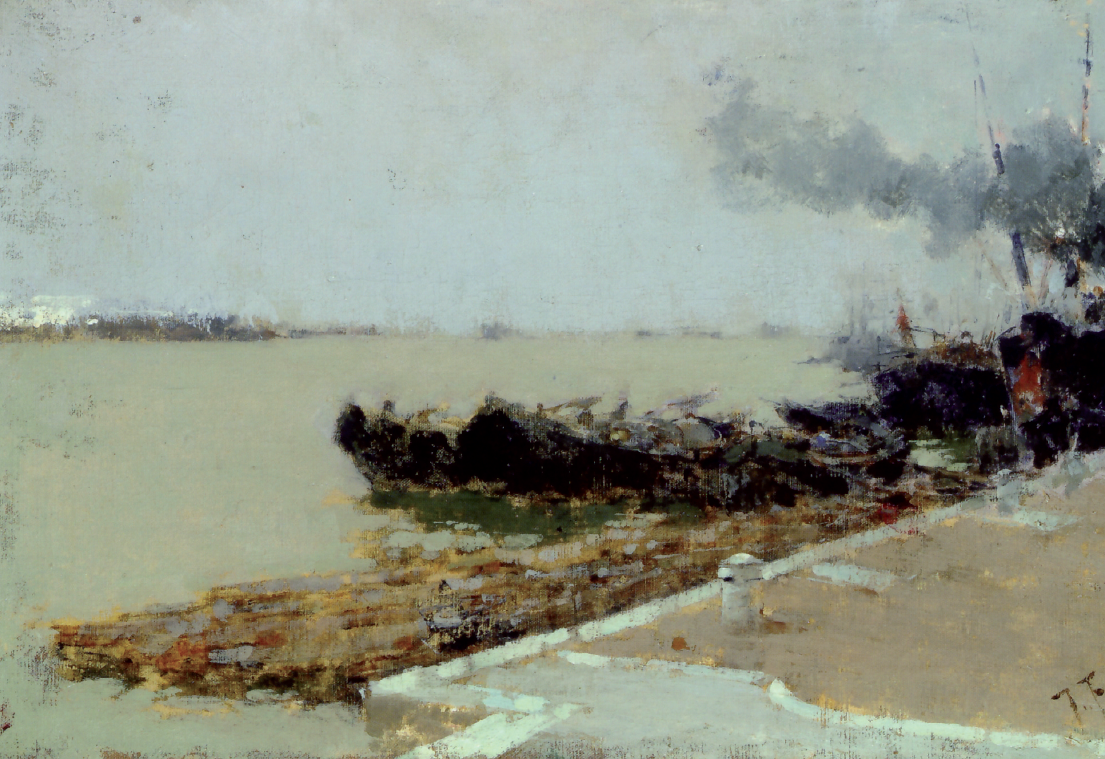
Venetian Lagoon (1877)

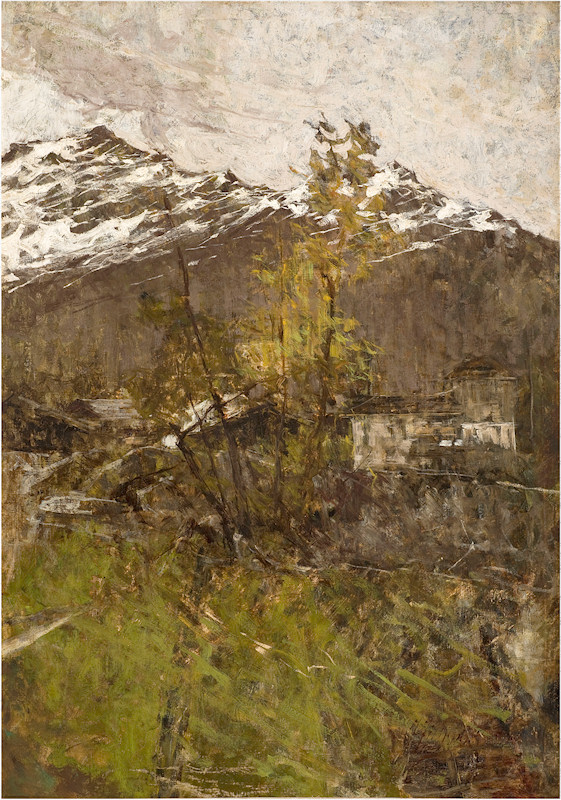
The First Snow (1889)

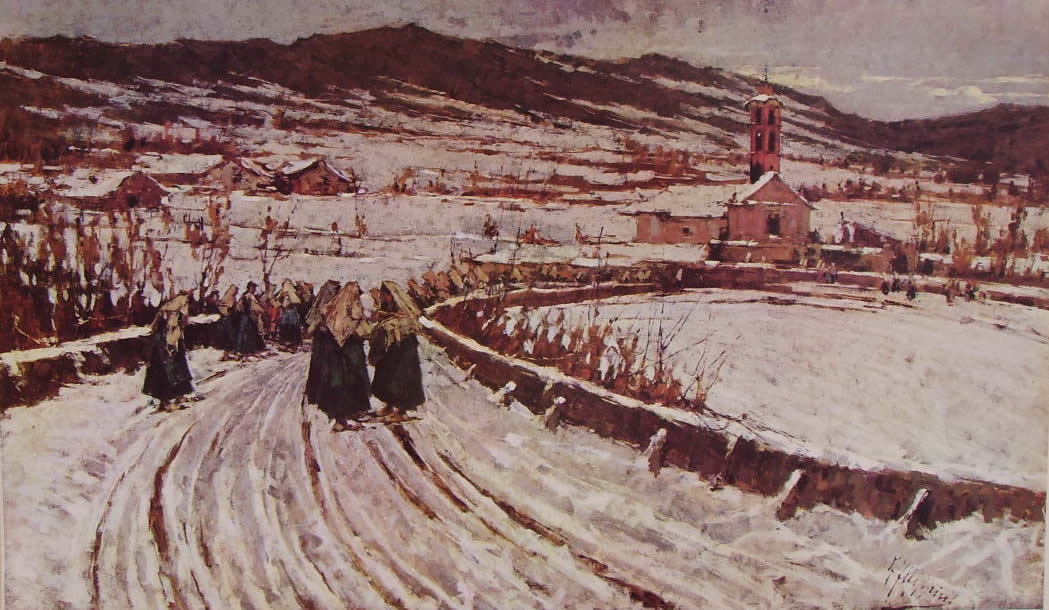
Evening in November (1891)

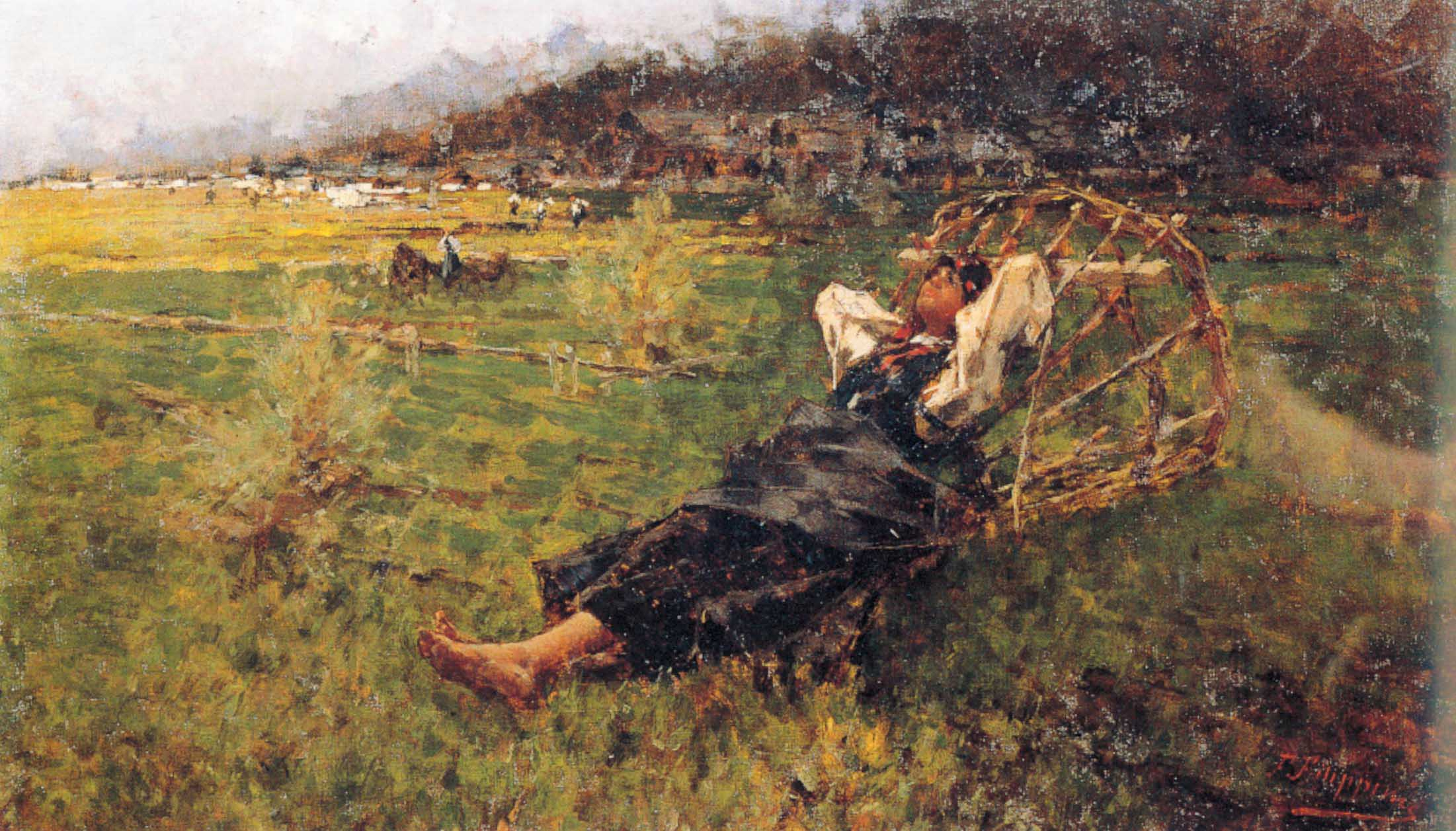
Peasant Girl at Rest (1892)
