= Amerino Cagnoni =

Italian painter (1853–1926)

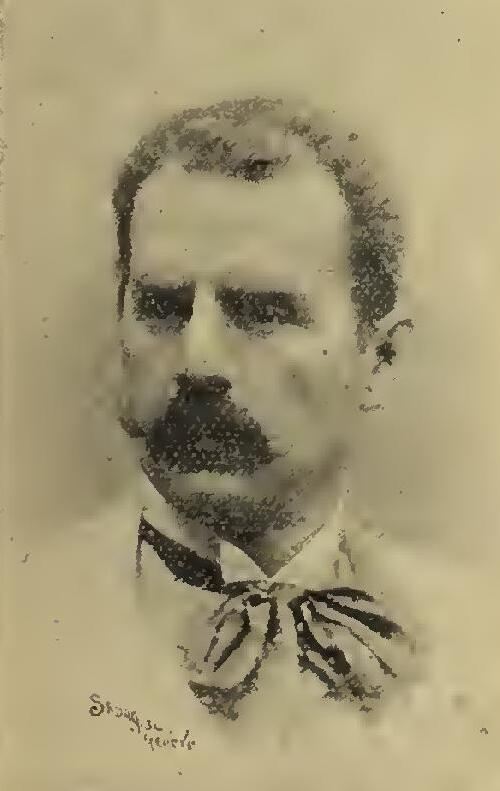
Amero Cagnoni

Amerino Cagnoni (Milan, July 16, 1853 – 1926) was an Italian painter.

== Biography ==
He initially studied classical education, but abandoned studies to take a job as director of a textile mill in Brianza, then moved to Asti as secretary of a wealthy family. At age 19 he enrolled as a student of Brera Academy, where he stayed for seven years. He painted The daughter of Curzio Pichena, a subject from the novel by Guerazzi. His Episode of the War of Italian Independence was awarded honorable mention in a government contest government of 1880 in Rome, and exhibited in 1881 in Milan. His painting Valentina was purchased by the Lottery Commission of Milan in 1881. The same year he executed a portrait of the painter Mantegna, reproduced in fresco for the lunettes of the Brera, a work that won the Mylius Prize. He painted numerous portraits including of Giuseppe Rattazzi, Antonia Longhi, Antonietta Bianchi, Giuseppe Lertora, Luigi Giannetti, Pietro Felice Sales, and Teresa Scaccabarozzi San Pietro
