= Pietro Michis =

Italian painter (1836–1903)

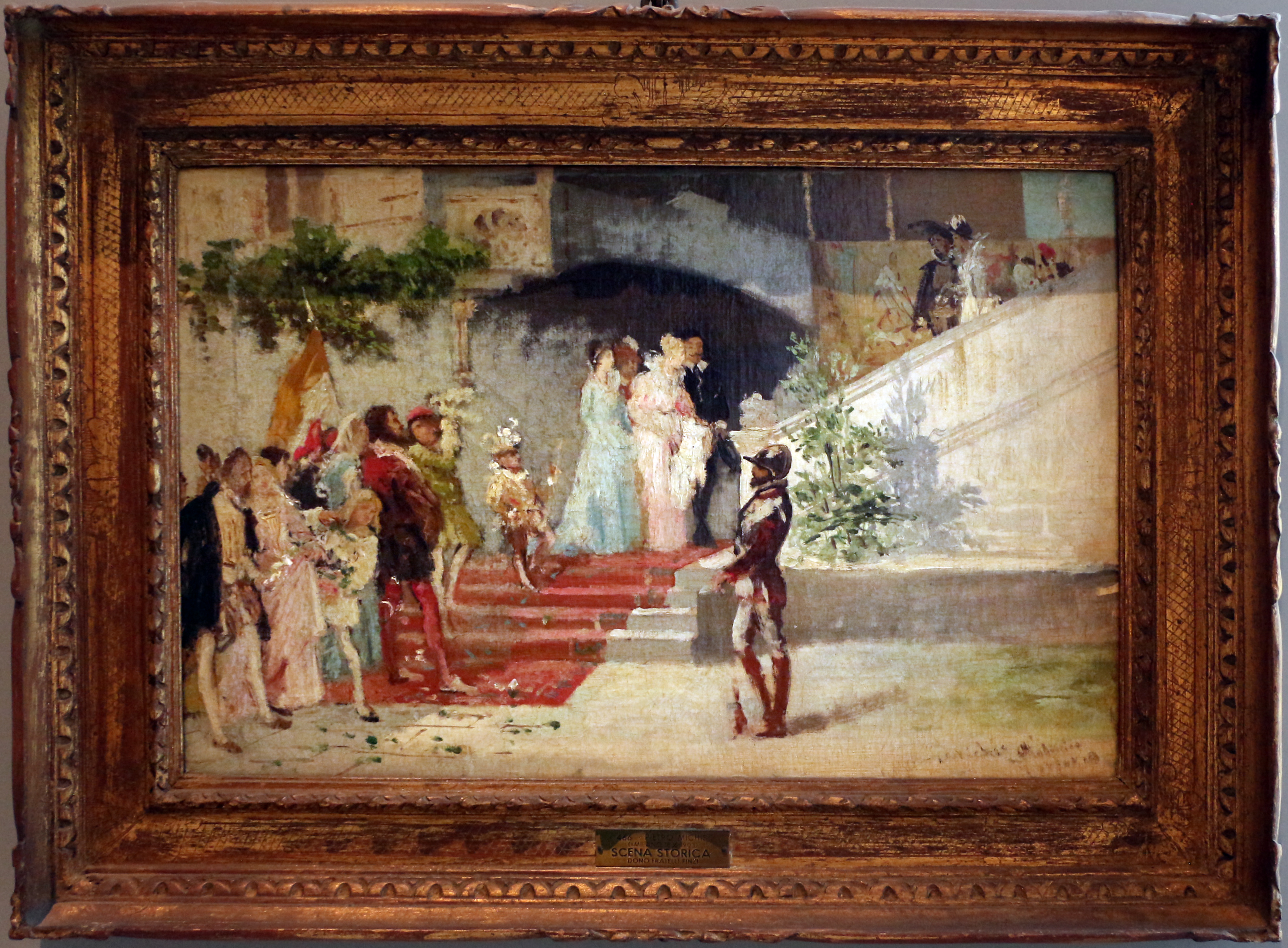
L'addio della sposa (1872)

Pietro Michis (August 12, 1836 – November 24, 1903) was an Italian painter, mostly of genre scenes.

== Biography ==
He was a resident of Milan, the city of his birth. In 1851 he began studies at the Brera Academy under Giuseppe Bertini. He married the painter Maria Cattaneo; they often worked together on canvases. He became director of the school of painting in Pavia.

Michis mainly painted both pure genre and historic subjects, sometimes called genere de costume or costumed genre. Among the main works of Michis: in 1887 at Naples, he exhibited Fruit of a Diverse Education, Vigil for Epiphany, and The modern pilgrim; in 1880 at Turin, he exhibited L'estremo vale di Leone X a Raffaello, The astrologer Cornelius Agrippa predicts to Francis I of France that he will be defeated at Pavia, and Il racconto del naufrago; in 1881 at Milan, Le beghine, Interior of Baptistery of Pisa; in 1883, a portrait of marchese Apollinare Rocca Saporiti della Sforzesca, completed by commission of the Count Marcello Rocca Saporiti della Sforzesca; and in 1884 at Turin, Astio antico and Nel cortile.
