= Filippo Carcano =

Italian painter (1840–1914)

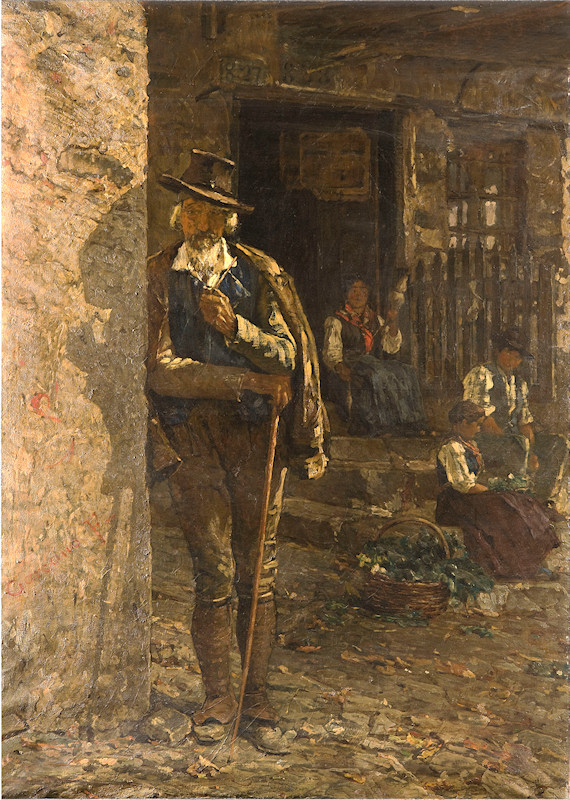
Prototype of a peasant family of the Veneto or Scene of Mountain Life (c. 1885, Fondazione Cariplo)

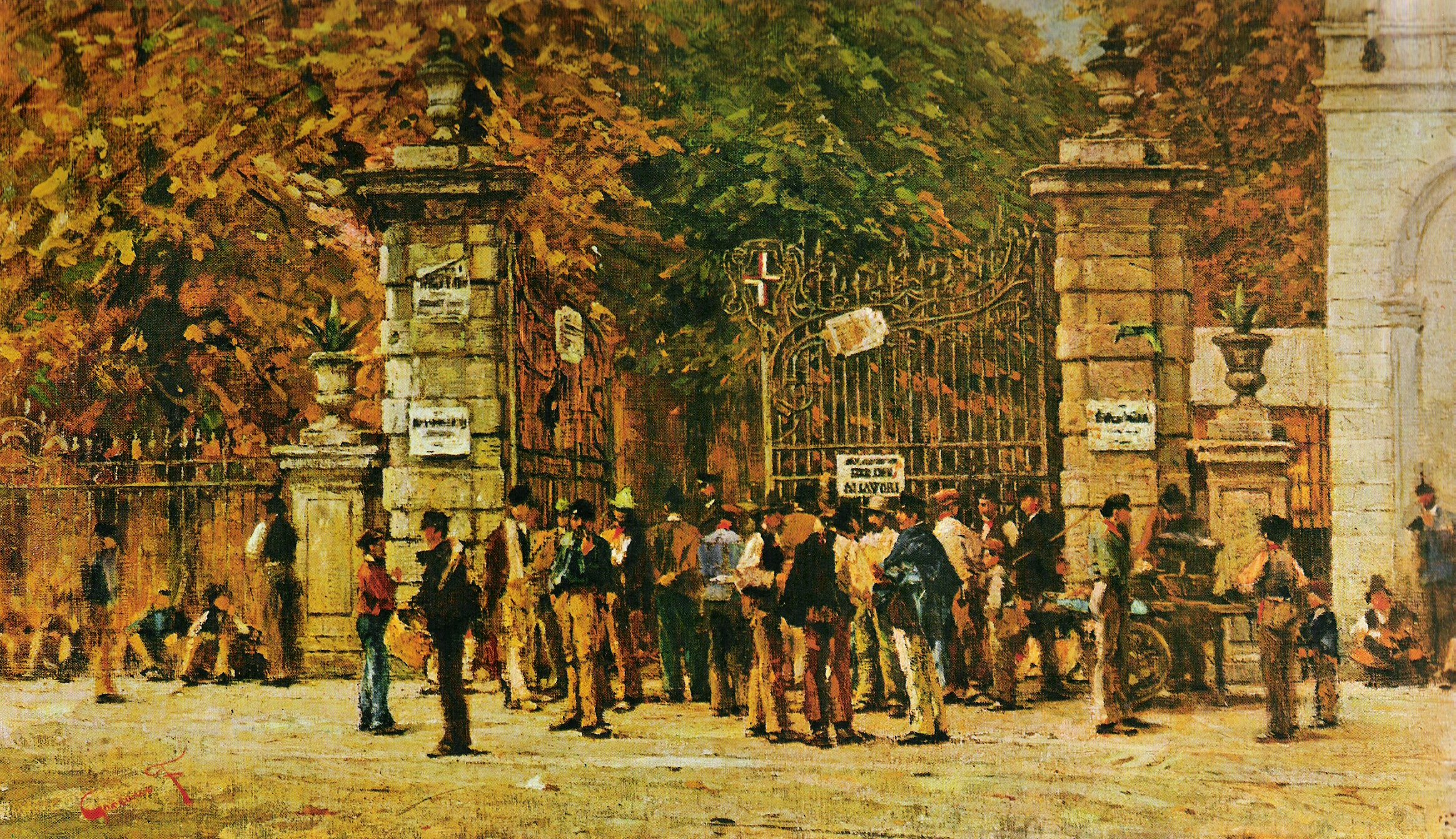
Break Time during Work on the Exhibition of 1881 (1887)

Filippo Carcano (25 September 1840 – 19 January 1914) was an Italian painter.

== Biography ==
Carcano was born in Milan, Italy. A pupil of Francesco Hayez at the Brera Academy in Milan as from 1855, he won the Canonica Prize with a work on a historical subject in 1862, while experimenting in the same period with painting from life. Carcano became friends with Francesco Filippini and Eugenio Gignous, with whom he would sometimes go to paint in Gignese. His interest in themes connected with reality is confirmed in subsequent works presenting scenes of an immediacy that reflects the contemporary developments in the field of the photography. One example is Break Time during Work on the Exhibition of 1881 (1887, Galleria d’Arte Moderna, Milan), presented at the Esposizione Nazionale di Belle Arti di Milano in 1881.

A leading figure in the school of Lombard Naturalism, he combined scenes of everyday life with numerous landscapes, featuring the surroundings of Lake Maggiore and the Mottarone as from the 1870s and the mountain peaks on the border with Switzerland at the end of the century. It was in the same period that he took up Symbolism, winning the Prince Umberto Prize at the Milan Triennale of 1897. Among his pupils was Umberto Bazzoli. One of his works is on display of the Museo Cantonale d'Arte of Lugano. The earthen tones and proletarian thematics often recall the works of Giuseppe Pellizza da Volpedo. Of his landscapes, one author states his name is associated with pictures of limitless and nebulous horizons.

== Gallery ==
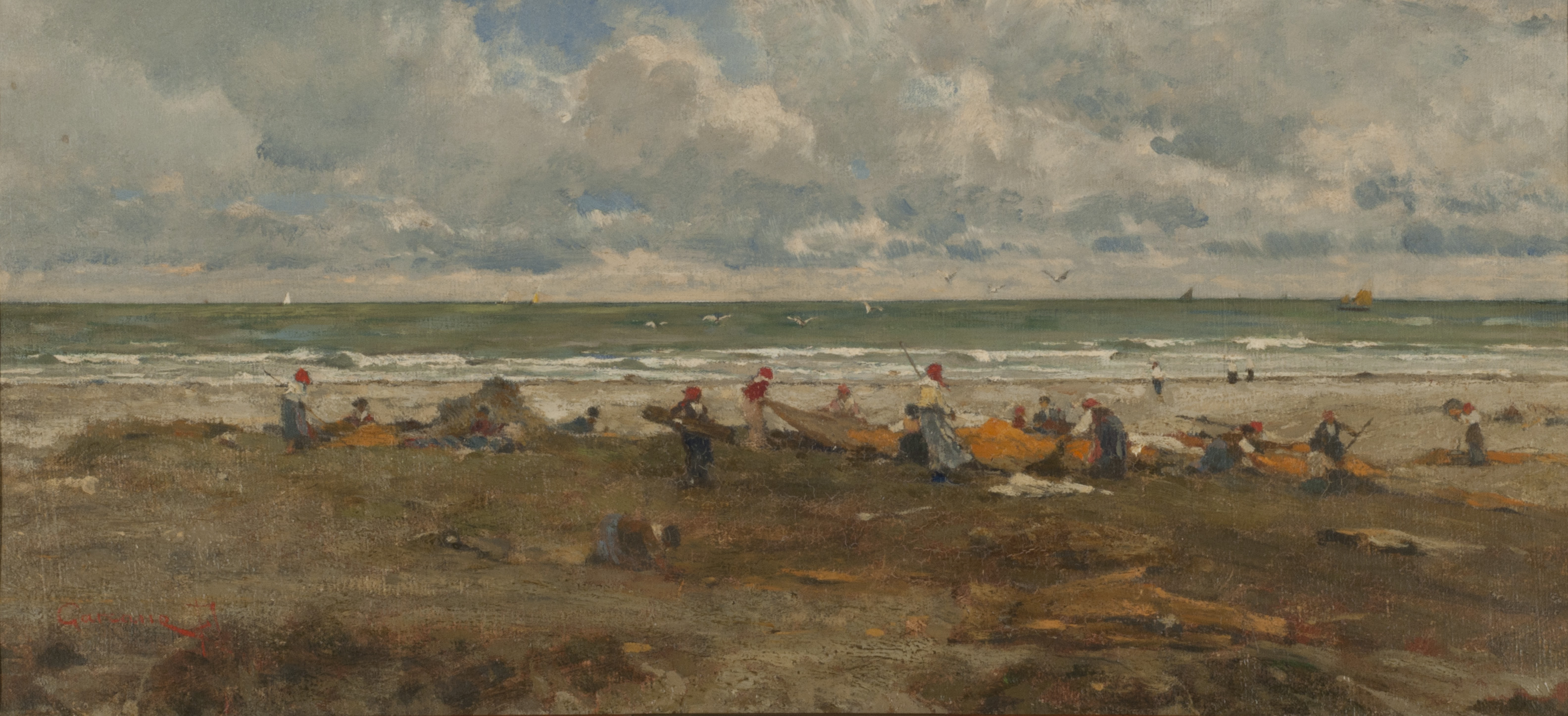
Fisherman on the Beach

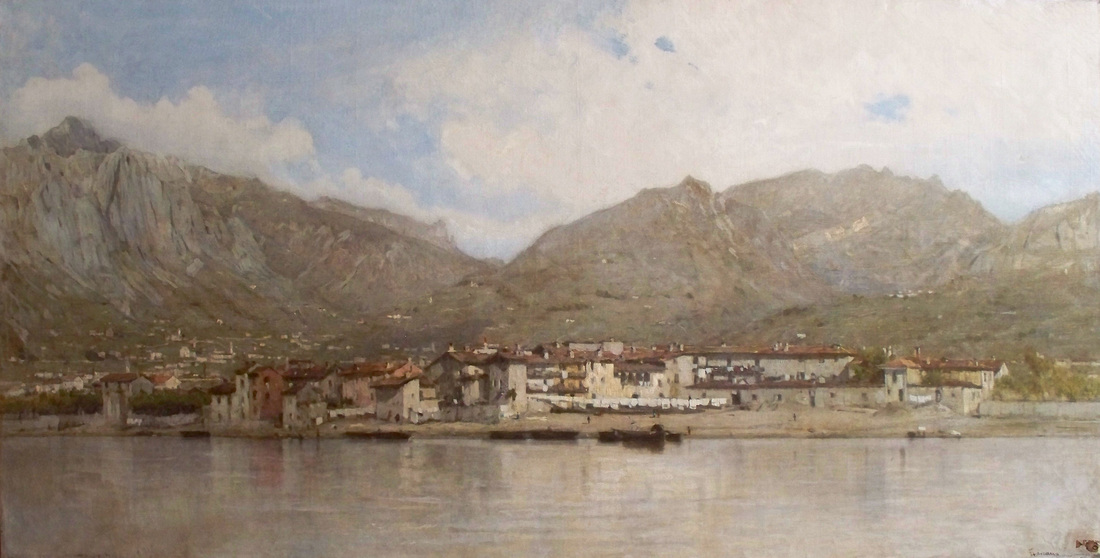
Pescarenico

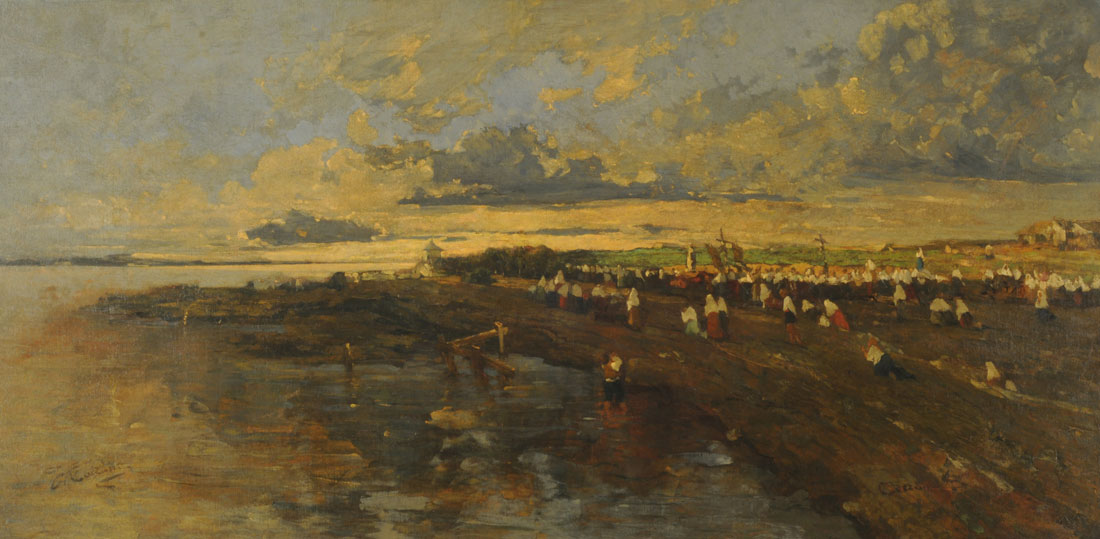
The Believers

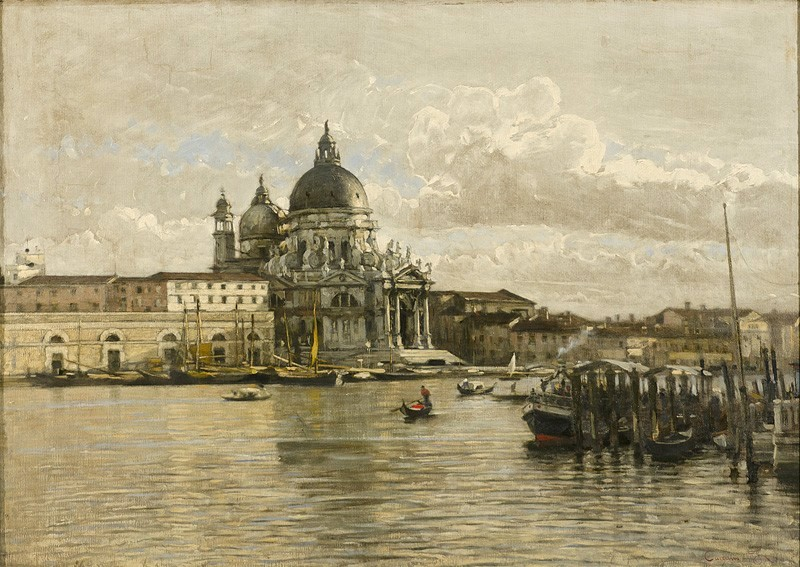
Igreja da Saúde

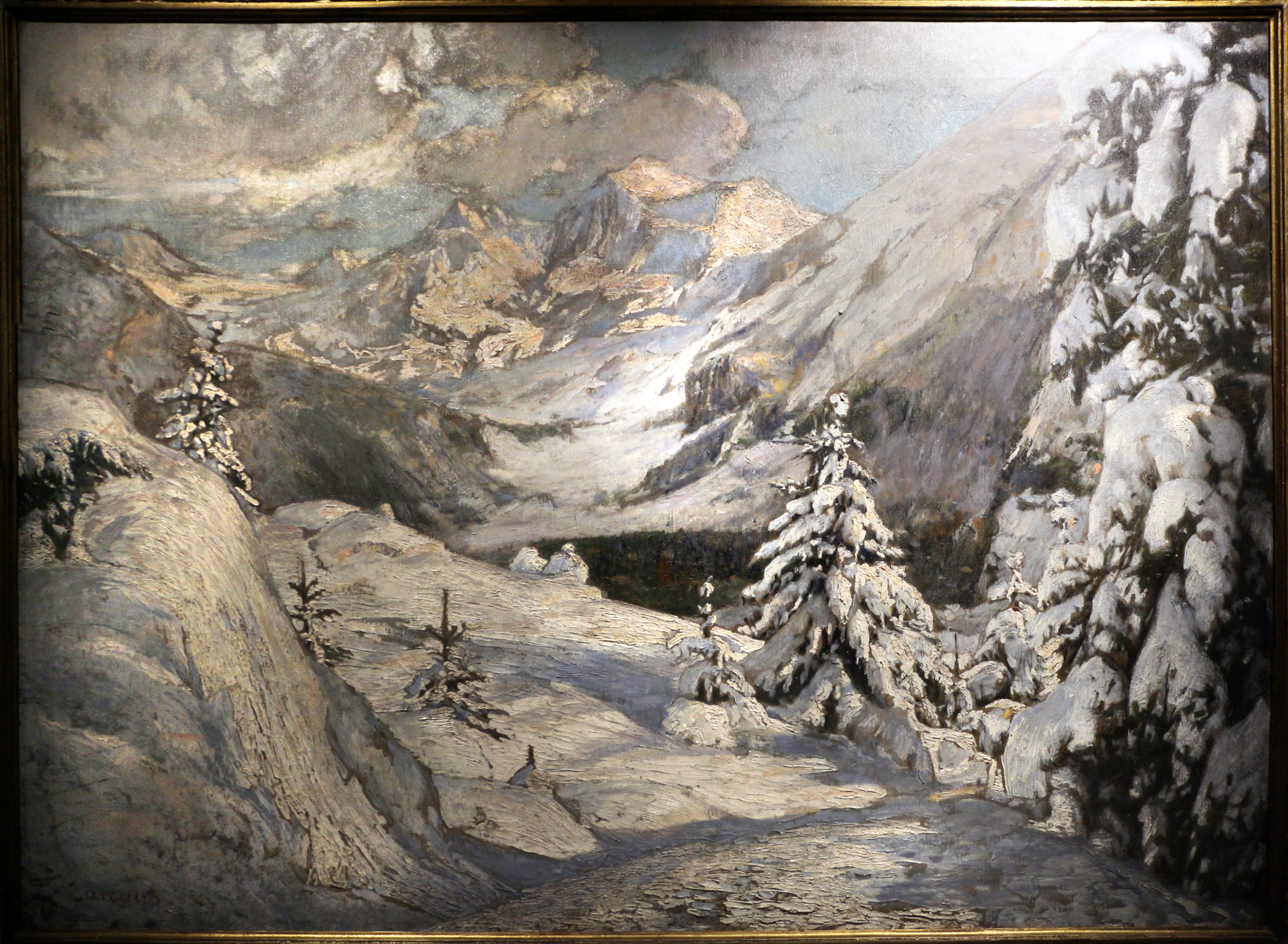
Inverno in Engadina
