= Giuseppe Bertini =

Italian painter (1825–1898)

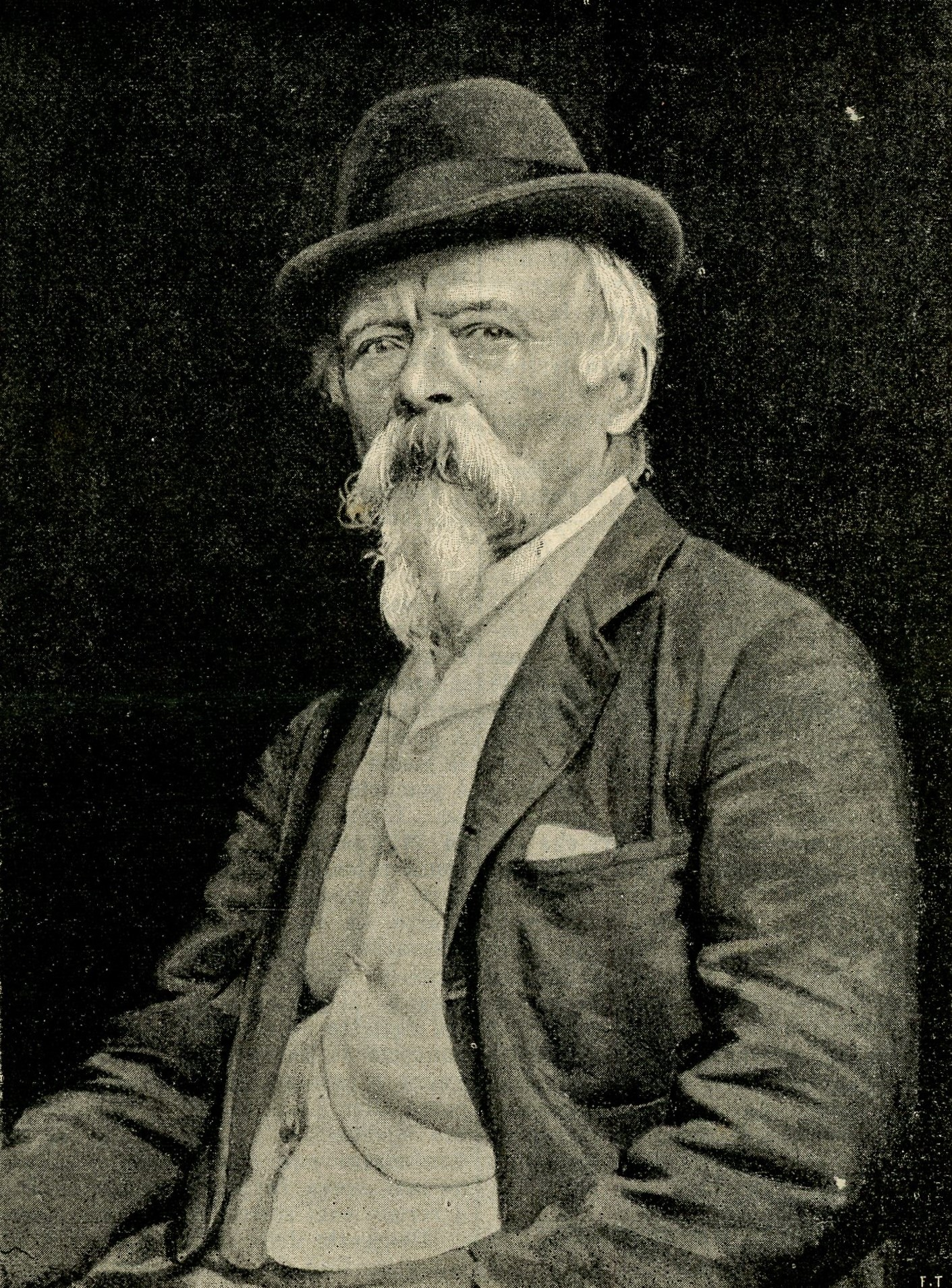
- Giuseppe Bertini.
- Born: 11 December 1825; Milan, Austrian Empire
- Died: 24 November 1898 (aged 72); Milan, Italy
- Known for: Painter
- Notable work: L'incontro di Dante e frate Ilario
- Movement: Verismo (painting)
- Awards: Gran premio di pittura dell'Accademia di Brera (1845)

Giuseppe Bertini (1825–1898) was an Italian painter, active in his native Milan.

== Biography ==
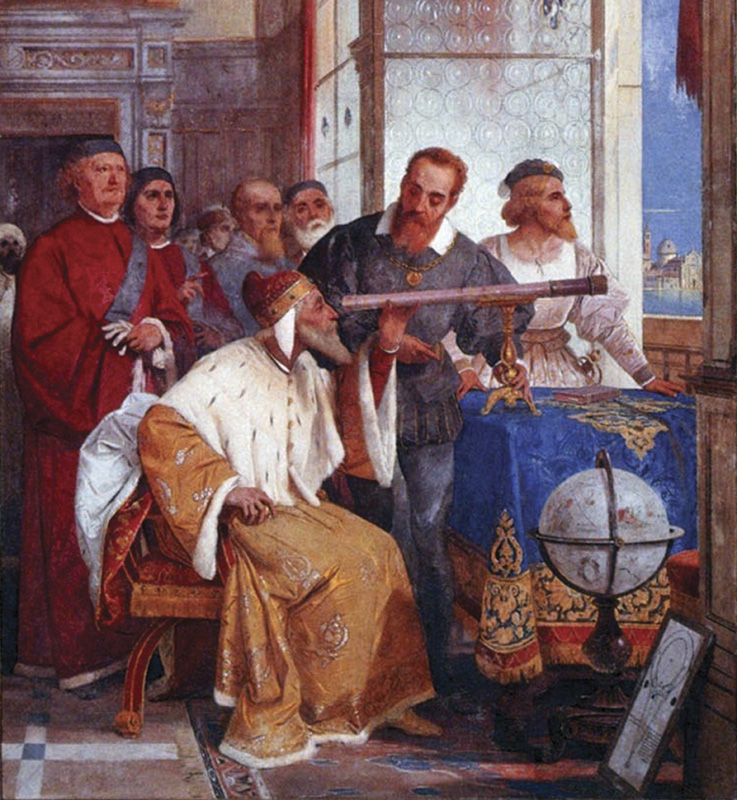
Fresco by Bertini of Galileo showing the Doge of Venice how to use the telescope

He studied at the Brera Academy under Luigi Sabatelli and Giuseppe Bisi, and in 1845 was awarded the Gran premio di pittura dell'Accademia di Brera on the strength of a picture of the meeting between Dante and Fra Ilario. He also painted the Triumphal entry of the allied sovereigns into Milan after the Battle of Magenta (after 1859). He also painted frescoes on a vaulted room of the residence of the Puricelli Guerra, representing the great men of the Middle Ages, backgrounded against perspectives of Gothic architecture.

He painted a Torquato Tasso introduced to Emmanuel Philibert; Death of St Joseph (commissioned by a parish in Palermo; an Assumption of the Virgin for a church in Valmarana in Altavilla Vicentina; an altarpiece of Vision of St Francis of Assisi for the church of San Babila, Milan; paintings for the palazzo of Count Ernesto Turati in Milan; and frescoes for the house of Cavalier Andrea Ponti in Varese representing Guido d'Arezzo teaching singing to a children's choir, as well as scenes from the life of Volta, Galileo, and Columbus. Among his masterworks is the fresco decoration of the Greek-Orthodox church of Trieste. He painted the sipario in collaboration with Raffaele Casnedi for the theater of La Scala in 1862.

The Sala Dorata in the Poldi-Pezzoli Museum at Milan has a series of three mural panels by Bertini at the end of the room opposite the window, the central one representing Painting, Sculpture, and Architecture, and the two lateral ones symbolizing Poetry and Music. Bertini painted decorations on the ceiling of the Dante Room. Bertini served as one of the founders and directors of this museum.

Between 1848 and 1860 he was occasionally employed as an instructor in the Brera Academy, and upon the reorganization of that institution in 1860 he was placed permanently in charge of one of the two schools of painting, (Hayez being in charge of the other), and continued to hold his professorship until the end of the 19th century. Giuseppe Barbaglia, Cesare Bertolotti, Emilio Cavenaghi, Francesco Filippini, Andrea Fossati, Pietro Michis, and Lodovico Pogliaghi were among his pupils. Pompeo Bertini, his brother, made stained glass windows, sometimes using designs by Giuseppe.
