= Bisi (surname) =

Bisi is an Italian surname. Notable people with the surname include:

- Adriana Bisi Fabbri (1881–1918), Italian painter
- Anna Maria Bisi (1938–1988), Italian archaeologist and academic
- Fra Bonaventura Bisi (1601–1659), Italian painter
- Cumali Bişi (born 1993), Turkish professional footballer
- Emilio Bisi (1850–1920), Italian sculptor
- Ernesta Legnani Bisi (1788–1859), Italian painter and engraver
- Fulvia Bisi (1818–1911), Italian landscape painter
- Giuseppe Bisi (1787–1869), Italian painter of landscapes in a Romantic style
- Luigi Bisi (1814–1886), Italian architect and painter
- Martin Bisi (born 1961), American producer and songwriter
- Michele Bisi (1788–?), Italian engraver and painter
- Paolo Bisi (born 1964), Italian comic book artist
- Patrizia Bisi, Italian writer of Daimon

== See also ==
- Bisi (disambiguation)
- Busi (surname)
- Bixio
