= Vincenzio Vangelisti =

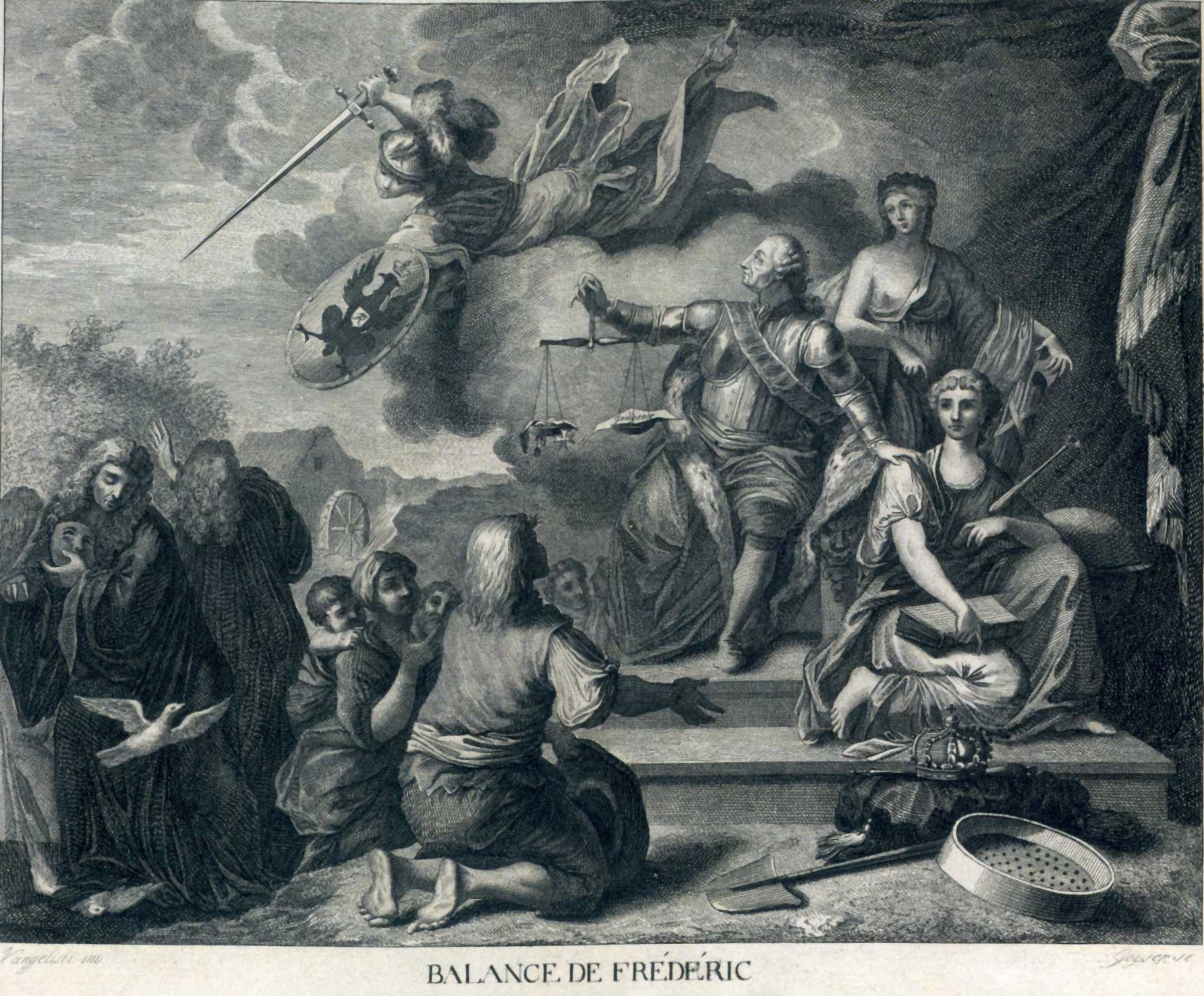
The Justice of Frederick (1780)

Vincenzio Vangelisti (c. 1740–1798) was an Italian engraver. He was born at Florence. He visited Paris when young, where he became a pupil of Ignazio Hugford and Johann Georg Wille. Emperor Leopold II of Austria invited him in 1766 to Milan, where he became professor in the Brera Academy, and in 1790 first director of the School of Engraving instituted by that prince. He committed suicide, after having defaced his remaining copper plates. Among engravers, who studied under him, were Giuseppe Longhi, who succeeded him as professor, and Faustino and Pietro Anderloni.

Among his engravings are:

- Pyramus and Thisbe from a picture by Laurent de La Hyre.
- Portraits of Armand de Bourbon, Prince de Conde. Georges Louis, Comte de Buffon; all after Abel de Pujol.
- Satyr and Nymph after one of the Van Loo artists.
- Virgin and Child after Raphael.
- Venus chastising Cupid after Agostino Carracci.
