= Joseph Caspar =

Swiss painter and engraver (1799–1880)

Joseph Caspar (born 1799 in Rorschach, Switzerland; died 1880) was a Swiss painter and engraver.

When Caspar was 16 he went to Rome and studied there by copying the works of Old Masters. Following Wilhelm von Schadow's advice, Caspar went to Berlin in 1820. In Berlin he settled down as a freelance artist.

The privy council of Beuth (German: Geheimrat von Beuth) advised him to specialize in copper engraving and supported him financially. He later became Giuseppe Longhi’s and Pietro Anderloni’s student for about four years in Milan.

Caspar returned to Berlin in 1826. Soon afterwards, he was appointed as a librarian of the Berlin University of the Arts.

== Selected works ==
- Fates (after Eduard Daege, held at Harvard Art Museums}
- Felix Mendelssohn Bartholdi (after Wilhelm Hensel, held at Harvard Art Museums}
- Madonna di Casa Colonna (after Raphael, held at Harvard Art Museums
- Nine muses (after Karl Wilhelm Wach)
- Saint Antonius (after Bartolomé Esteban Murillo)
- Saint Barbara (after Giovanni Antonio Beltraffio)
- Thomas von Savoyen (after Anthony van Dyck)
- Titian's Daughter Bearing a Dish of Fruit (after Titian, held at Harvard Art Museums}
