= Busi =

Busi can refer to:

- Busi (given name)
- Busi (surname)
- Busi, village in Kosovo
- Sergio Busquets (footballer, born 1988)
- Al-Busi, a former small state in present-day Yemen, one of the five sheikhdoms of Upper Yafa
- Busi (Tanzanian ward), an administrative ward in the Kondoa district of the Dodoma Region of Tanzania
