= Fulvia Bisi =

Italian painter

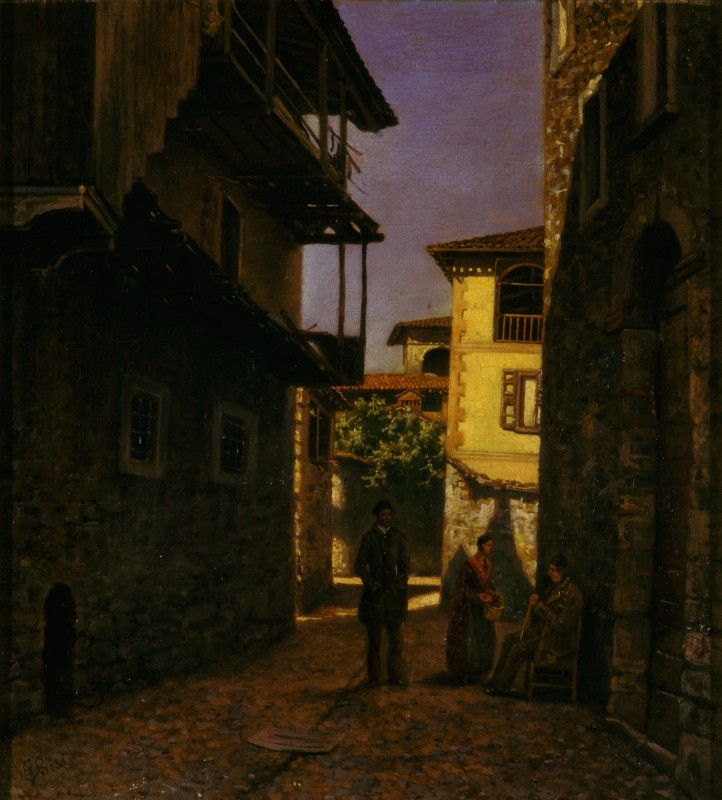
Paesaggio lombardo, 1850–1865, attributed, (Fondazione Cariplo)

Fulvia Bisi (1818–1911) was an Italian landscape painter.

== Biography ==
She was born in Milan. Her father, the landscape painter Giuseppe Bisi, had studied under the engraver Giuseppe Longhi; her mother was Ernesta Legnani. She apprenticed with her father, whose style and subjects she adopted in her early works. In 1842 she made her debut at the Esposizione di Belle Arti at the Brera Academy and assiduously participated in the following editions of the exhibition until 1859. Her uncle, Luigi Bisi, became president of the Academy in 1880.

After being awarded a prize at the Brera Academy in 1845 for a large mountain landscape, Bisi became established on the Milanese art scene as an heir to the Romantic Lombard tradition. She began to exhibit frequently and participated in the main shows in Turin, Parma and Florence, at the 1881 Esposizione Nazionale in Milan and in Venice in 1887, and was a notable success on the market. From the mid-1840s she began to break away from her father’s influence and produced a vast repertoire of Lombard and Ticinese views and landscapes influenced by the contemporary researches in a naturalistic key conducted by Giuseppe Canella. In her maturity she achieved a signature style characterised by a vibrant handling, consisting of short brushstrokes and a particular sensibility to the atmospheric and luministic values of landscape.

At the 1880 Exhibition of Turin, she submitted a Monte Rosa veduto da Alagna e Valgonna (views of Lombardy). In 1881 in Turin, she exhibited a Park in Lombardy. At the 1887 Mostra Nazionale of Venice, she exhibited a Palude con effetto di temporale.

Bisi died in Milan in 1911.

== Bibliography ==
- Elena Lissoni, Fulvia Bisi, online catalogue Artgate by Fondazione Cariplo, 2010, CC BY-SA (source for the first revision of this article).
