= Faustino Anderloni =

Italian engraver

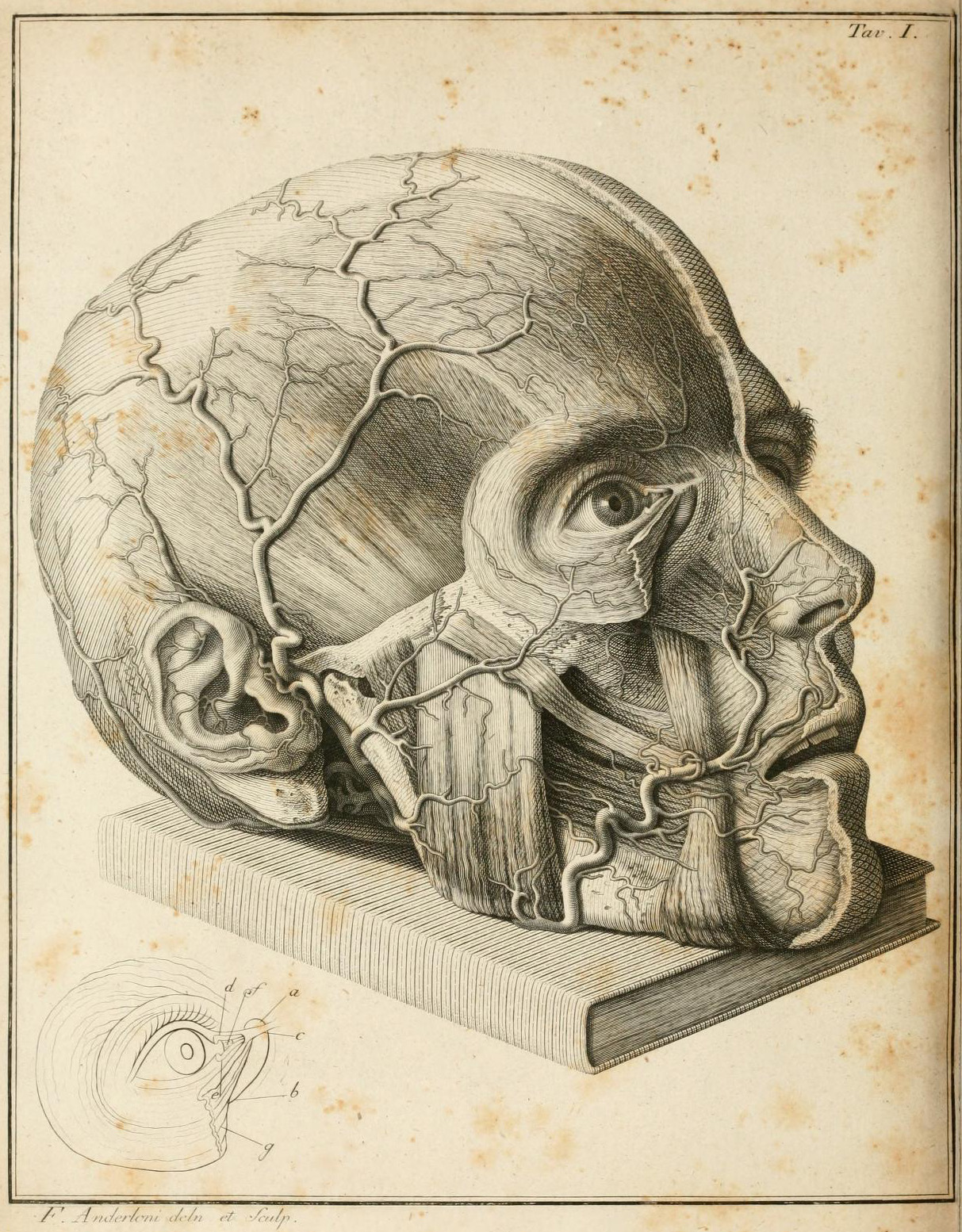
Illustration from The Main Eye Diseases by Scarpa

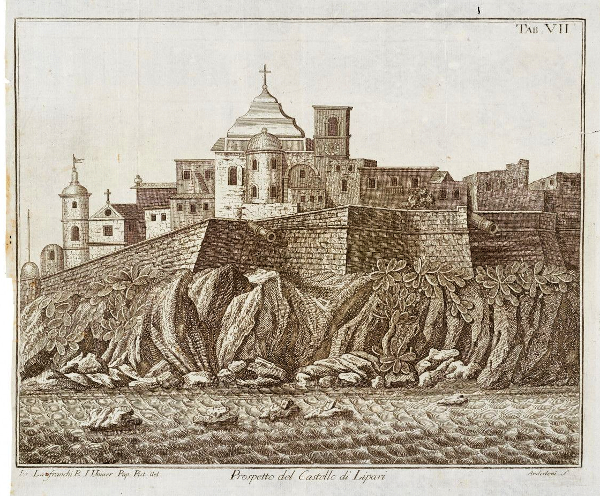
Lipari Castle, from an album of Sicilian scenes

Faustino Anderloni (1766, Brescia - 9 January 1847, Pavia) was an Italian engraver.

== Life and work ==
Anderloni was born in 1766 in Brescia, Republic of Venice. He was one of seven children born to Giovanni Battista Anderloni, a wealthy farmer, and Anna Maria née Ronco. His youngest brother, Pietro, whom he helped train, also became an engraver. While studying in his hometown, he developed an early interest in scientific and educational illustration. By 1782, he had already produced a few plates for a work on anatomy by Antonio Scarpa, which was published in Pavia.

In 1784, he moved to Pavia to oversee the production of illustrations for two more of Scarpa's works, on the nervous system and bones. During that time, he also created plates for a major treatise on zoology and botany by Giovanni Antonio Scopoli. Upon completing his work there, he moved to Milan in 1795, where he reproduced works by Guido Reni and Correggio, as well as frescoes by Perino del Vaga at the Palazzo Doria. He also collaborated on several projects with Giuseppe Longhi.

He returned to Pavia in 1801 to become an art teacher. His brother Pietro joined him there, to learn engraving and be his assistant. In 1808, he was appointed to the Chair of Drawing at the University of Pavia. He would remain there until 1830.

From there, he settled in Florence, where his brother-in-law, Giovita Garavaglia, had recently become director of the Academy of Fine Arts. When Garavaglia died, four years later, he completed several works that had been left unfinished. Over the next few years, he specialized in portraits.

He died in Pavia, aged eighty. His works have been preserved in numerous collections; notably at the Harvard Art Museums.
