= Giovita Garavaglia =

Italian engraver

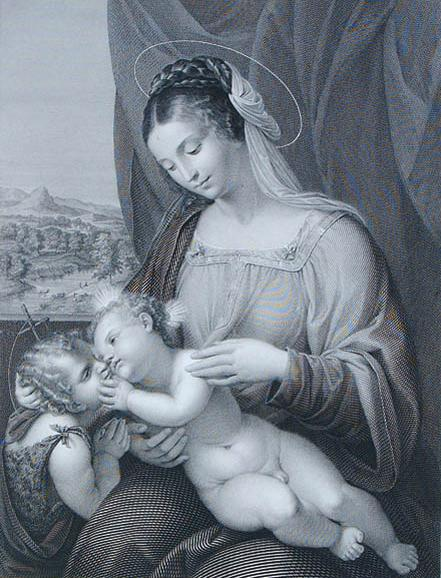
Madonna and Child with St.John

Giovita Garavaglia (18 March 1790 in Pavia, Region of Lombardy – 27 April 1835 in Florence) was an Italian engraver.

== Biography ==
Initially a pupil of Pietro Anderloni, whom he helped engrave the medical depictions of Antonio Scarpa, he later worked with Giuseppe Longhi in the engravings of the Erodiade by Bernardino Luino, The Holy Family by Raphael, and a Portrait of Charles. He moved to Florence to work with the lithographer Luigi Bardi, engraving the David found at the Palazzo Pitti and originally painted by Guercino; a Child Jesus by Carlo Maratta, a Jacob by Appiani, and the Madonna della seggiola. He engraved the Magdalen by Carlo Dolci, and a Madonnina by Villardi, the painting of Beatrice Cenci by Guido Reni.

With the death of Morghen, the Grand Duke Ferdinand III of Tuscany named Garavaglia director of the Academy of Fine Arts of Florence. He did suddenly while engraving a copy of the Assumption by Guido Reni.
