= Giuseppe Biagi (painter) =

Italian painter (born 1949)

Giuseppe Biagi (born 3 February 1949) is an Italian painter and member of the Metacosa Movement.

== Biography ==
Born in Viareggio, Biagi attended the Carrara High School and then studied later at the University of Pisa. In 1981, he joined the Narciso Art Group founded by critic Giorgio Di Genova. Some of the other artists involved were Michele Cossyro, Giuseppe Rogolino and Luca Maria Patella. Two years later, he joined the Metacosa group with Giuseppe Bartolini, Gianfranco Ferroni, Bernardino Luino, Sandro Luporini, Lino Mannocci and Giorgio Tonelli. The group first exhibited at Villa Paolina in Viareggio in 1983 in an exhibition curated by the critic Roberto Tassi, who kept working with the group in subsequent exhibitions.

In 1988, Biagi had a solo show at Studio Steffanoni in Milan curated by Roberto Tassi and Vittorio Sgarbi. Other solo presentations of his work include Recent Works at the Galleria Forni of Bologna (curated by Flaminio Gualdoni) and at Galleria Il Polittico di Roma in 1990. Biagi's work was also included in the group shows Narcissus, Palazzo delle Esposizioni, Rome (1982); Objective Image, Galleria Davico, Turin (1983); and Quinto: Three Years of Engraving, Palazzo della Permanente, Milan (1986). In 1996, he participated in the Quadriennale of National Art in Rome. His work was purchased by the Chamber of Deputies of Montecitorio, Rome.

In 2004, the Metacosa's group met was honoured with a retrospective curated by Philippe Daverio, Phenomenology of Metacosa: 7 Artists in 1979 in Milan and 25 years later at Spazio Oberdan in Milan. In 2007, he participated in the Italian Art exhibition 1968-2007 Painting at Palazzo Reale in Milan curated by Maurizio Sciaccaluga, while in 2011 he was invited by Mina Gregori to participate to the Italian Pavilion curated by Vittorio Sgarbi at the 54th Venice Biennale.

In 2013, Biagu exhibited in an exhibition organized by Porsche, Cofani, at the Portofino Park Museum and Forte dei Marmi, along with Bruno Ceccobelli, Gillo Dorfles, Marco Lodola, and Ben Vautier. Biagi's works are in public museum collections such as the House of Representatives of Rome, GAMC of Viareggio, MAGI '900 – Museum of Artistic and Historical Excellencies in Bologna, and Epicentro Museum in Barcellona Pozzo di Gotto, Messina.

== Selected bibliography ==
- Alessandro Riva, Giuseppe Biagi: The Pretext of Painting, Galleria La Subbia, Pietrasanta, 2013
- Vittorio Sgarbi, The Painted Room, Bompiani, Milan, 2012
- Giuseppe Biagi "... from land to land ...", Diaphoria, cartilage nº6, Viareggio, 2011
- Ruggero Savinio, Vertical in The Deposited Image, Centobuchi, Ascoli Piceno, 2000
- Giorgio Soavi, Giuseppe Biagi: Works, Ceribelli Gallery, Bergamo, 1998
- Alessandro Riva, "In addition to Reality", Arte Mondadori, August 1996
- Marco Goldin, Twenty Painters in Italy, Marini, Treviso, 1994
- Flaminio Gualdoni, Giuseppe Biagi, The Enchanted Room, Milan, 1992
- Vittorio Sgarbi, The Sling of Biagi, Steffanoni, Milan, 1988
- Vittorio Sgarbi, The Space of Silence, Fondazione Cariplo, Milan, 1987
- Roberto Tassi, La Metacosa, Cedis, Bergamo 1983
- Giorgio Di Genoa, Narcissus, 1981
