= Sandro Luporini =

Italian painter (born 1930)

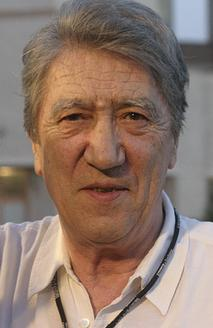
Sandro Luporini

Sandro Luporini (born 12 July 1930) is a painter, lyricist and Italian writer. He is also a member of the Metacosa Movement.

== Biography ==
As an athlete he played in the Sailing Viareggio, together with his brother Francesco Luporini, before the Serie A and then the national basketball team.

Luporini was born in Viareggio, Italy. In 1953 he studied engineering at the University of Pisa leaving studies to paint and move to Rome. In 1956 he was in Milan and participated in several exhibitions together with the painters of the Bergamini Gallery, taking part in the events of existential realism. She lives in the same neighborhood as a young songwriter: Giorgio Gaber. Between the two, after the casual acquaintance in the bar they both attended, a friendship began soon in artistic collaboration: the two write together the lyrics of the plays and the theatrical performances while Gaber interprets.

The first collaboration between the two is, however, for a song played in 1961 by Maria Monti, Sono the ninth, which the singer presents on the record as "written by a friend of mine, describing Milan just as he would represent a painter"; In the back cover the author's surname is incorrectly reported as Luparini.

His pictorial activity continues: Luporini exposes paintings in the most important national shows, obtaining awards and prizes. In 2005 the City of Pisa, in collaboration with Adac di Modena, presided over by Adriano Primo Baldi, dedicates a personal exhibition to the Teatro Verdi. On this occasion is published in addition to the catalog of the paintings "Sandro Luporini - Metaphysics of the newspaper" with texts by Giuseppe Cordoni, Marilena Pasquali, Eugenio Riccomini, also the volume "Images, words and notes in the work of Sandro Luporini", a collection Of materials and texts on the theater of Giorgio Gaber and Sandro Luporini, curated by Micaela Bonavia. Sandro Luporini, together with Giuseppe Bartolini, Giuseppe Biagi, Gianfranco Ferroni, Bernardino Luino, Lino MannocciAnd Giorgio Tonelli belongs to the artistic movement of the Metacosa Movement. The first exhibition was held in 1979 in Brescia, with the presentation of the critic Roberto Tassi.

== The meeting with Gaber ==
So Luporini described the encounter with Gaber:

"It was a very casual thing, in the sense that we lived near Milan. We were on the same bar. They presented me by saying that he was the singer, I was the painter. So I went to see his performances and he came to see my paintings. We became friends. I remember finding a kid who was nineteen, thin like a nail, and I went to listen to him. He played the rock in English, I did not understand anything, but I was bewildered by the energy he was wearing. We have become very friends, then we have often visited. At some point, attending our study (I had a studio with other painters friends), we spent the days talking. One day he said to me, "But why do not we try to write something together?". And so we started the first attempts that remained in the drawer, because they were a bit extravagant and not so commercial. He then still performed through normal channels, television to understand. So at the beginning it was just a game, just a game. This is the first impact.
