= Metacosa Movement =

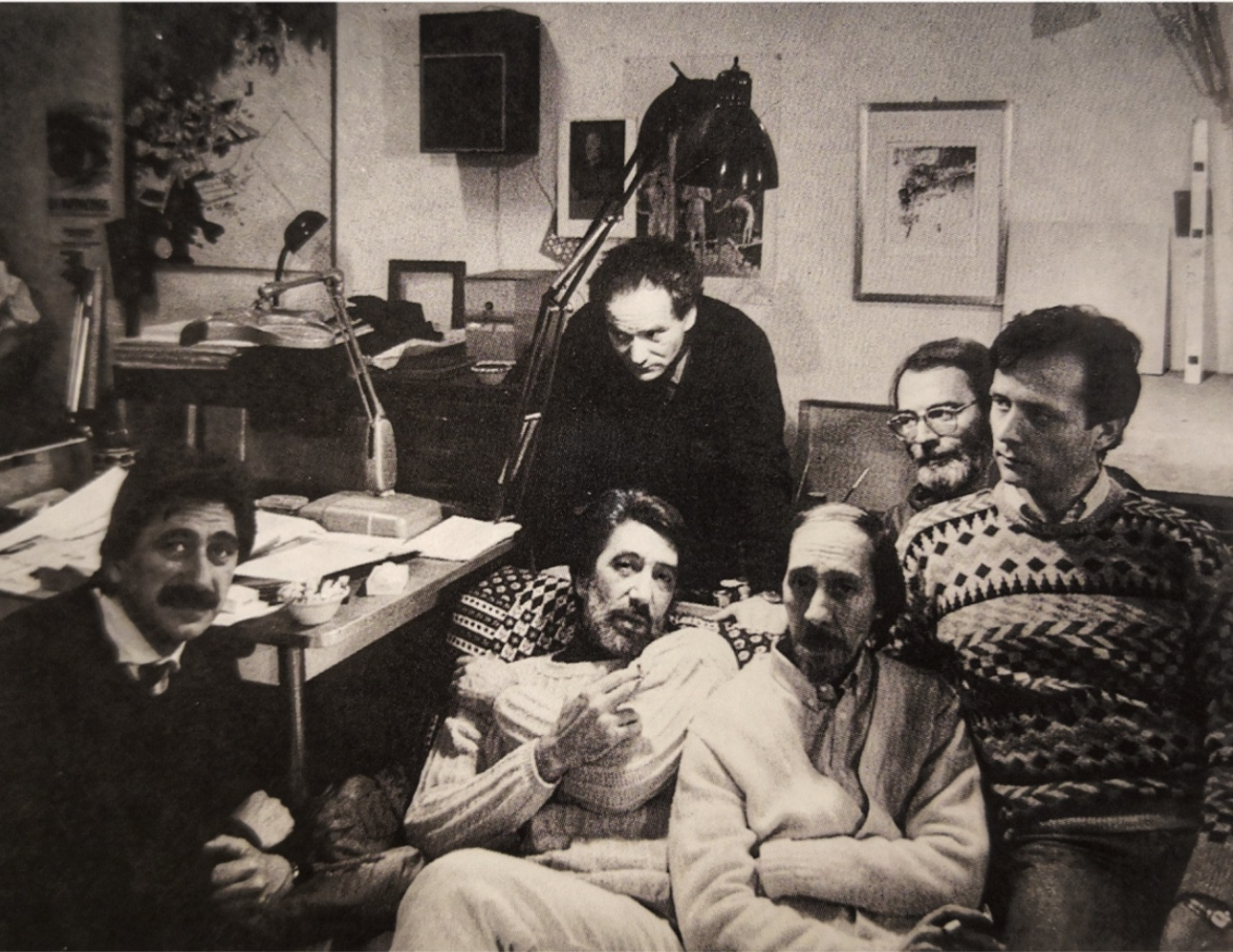
The Metacosa Giuseppe Bartolini, Giuseppe Biagi (standing), Sandro Luporini, Gianfranco Ferroni, Giorgio Tonelli and Lino Mannocci in the Milanese studio of Ferroni, 1983.

The Metacosa is an Italian art movement founded in the late 1970s.

== History ==
The group was formed by Giuseppe Bartolini, Giuseppe Biagi, Gianfranco Ferroni, Bernardino Luino, Sandro Luporini, Lino Mannocci and Giorgio Tonelli.

The first exhibition was held in 1979 in Brescia, with the presentation of the critic Roberto Tassi who followed the activity also in the subsequent exhibitions. Other exhibitions were held in Milan, Viareggio, Bergamo and Vicenza.

The Metacosa has a figurative matrix of poetic intensity with accurate and calculated pictorial research. During his first exhibition in Brescia in 1979, Roberto Tassi wrote: "Every painter in this group has its own light, the quality and substance of light being different in each of them, the coincidence of poetics does not involve coincidence of style or poetry The fascination and the truth of the exhibition is precisely in this, in joining a common idea, and almost philosophy, painting, very different artists."

In 2004, at the Oberdan Square in Milan, the exhibition Methanoid Phenomenology was held by Philippe Daverio.
