= Dawn Cavanagh =

South African activist

- Born: 23 March 1962 (age 64); Westwood
- Education: Fairvale Senior Secondary School University of Natal University of South Africa Emerson High School
- Known for: Activist
- Spouse: Brian Cavanagh
- Relatives: Danette Voorhis Donna Patton Debbie DuVall Daniel Marone, Jr

Dawn Cavanagh (23 March 1962) is a South African activist, writer and feminist.

== Early life and education ==
Cavanagh was born on 23 March 1962. She attended Fairvale Senior Secondary School in Wentworth, KwaZulu-Natal, and graduated from the University of Natal with a Bachelor of Science degree in social work in 1982. She received a Bachelor of Arts degree in social work from the University of South Africa in 1996 and studied for a master's degree in development studies from the University of Natal.

== Career ==
Cavanagh has been active in South Africa in the fields of equal access to healthcare, HIV/AIDS activism, women's rights, sexual rights and reproductive rights. She has worked on social justice projects and development in local communities and in regional and international spaces.

In 2004, she worked for the Forum for the Empowerment of Women and Coalition of African Lesbians, the first Black lesbian rights organization in South Africa. She also worked for Oxfam as well as the Civil Rights Defenders, Akina Mama wa Afrika and the Women's Leadership Centre in Namibia.

She helped found the Coalition of African Lesbians in 2004 and became its director in 2010. In 2014, Cavanagh set up the Masakhane programme (Zulu for "Come, let's get stronger together") with the German LSVD to provide better networking and empowerment to lesbian, bisexual and transgender women in sub-Saharan Africa.

Cavanagh also worked with AWID.

== Publications ==
- "Losing the Beijing Agenda in the Sea of 'New Solutions' to HIV and AIDS" (2005), in Agenda: Empowering Women for Gender Equity.
- The OTHER REFLECT: Five Years of Building a Community Foundation with LGBTIQ people in Southern Africa External Review (2019) (with Hope Chigudu)
