= Paolo Caronni =

Italian engraver

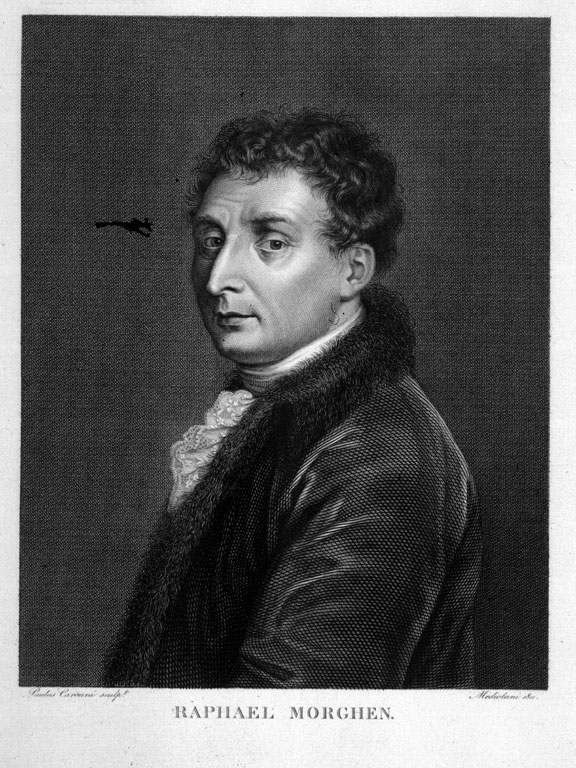
The Italian Engraver and Etcher Raffaello Morghen by Paolo Caronni, 1811

Paolo Caronni (12 March 1779 – 3 March 1842) was an Italian engraver. He was born in Monza and studied at the Accademia di Brera. He was a pupil of Giuseppe Longhi. He died at Milan. Among his plates are:

- Vision of Ezekiel after Raphael 1825.
- Alexander and Darius (1818).
- Venus suckling the Infant Cupid after Parmigianino.
- Venus stealing Cupid's Bow after Procaccini.
- The Virgin and Child after Sassoferrato (painter).
- The Triumph of David after Domenichino.
- A Portrait of Raffaelo Morghen.
