= Gaetano Gariboldi =

Italian painter (1815–1857)

Gaetano Gariboldi (November 8, 1815 – July 11, 1857) was an Italian painter, active in a painting landscapes.

He was born in Milan, and died there. He was enrolled in the academy under Luigi Sabatelli, but preferred painting landscapes in the style of Giuseppe Bisi.
