= Bisi =

Bisi may refer to:

- Bisi (firstname), Nigerian first name
- Bisi (surname), Indian surname

== Given name ==
- Bifus or Bisi (f. 670), English bishop
- Bisi Adeleye-Fayemi (born 1963), British-Nigerian activist and author
- Bisi Afolabi (born 1975), female track and field athlete from Nigeria
- Bisi Akande (1939, ??), governor of Osun State
- Bisi Alimi (born 1975), Nigerian activist
- Bisi Ezerioha (born 1972), American racing driver and engineer
- Bisi Komolafe (1986–2012), Nigerian actress, film director and producer
- Bisi Olateru-Olagbegi (1953-2015), Nigerian activist and Director of the Women Consortium of Nigeria
- Bisi Onabanjo (1927-1990), governor of Ogun State in Nigeria
- Bisi Onasanya (born 1961), Nigerian banker
- Bisi Silva, Nigerian art curator
- Bisi Teru (born 1974), Information Technology Professional and Entrepreneur

== Other ==
- Bisi Bele Bath, Indian rice-based dish
- Bisi, KwaZulu-Natal, municipality in the KwaZulu-Natal province of South Africa
- Bisi, Daughter of the River, highest-grossing Nigerian film
- Siglufjörður Airport, Airport in Iceland with ICAO code BISI
