= Eliseo Sala =

Italian painter (1813–1879)

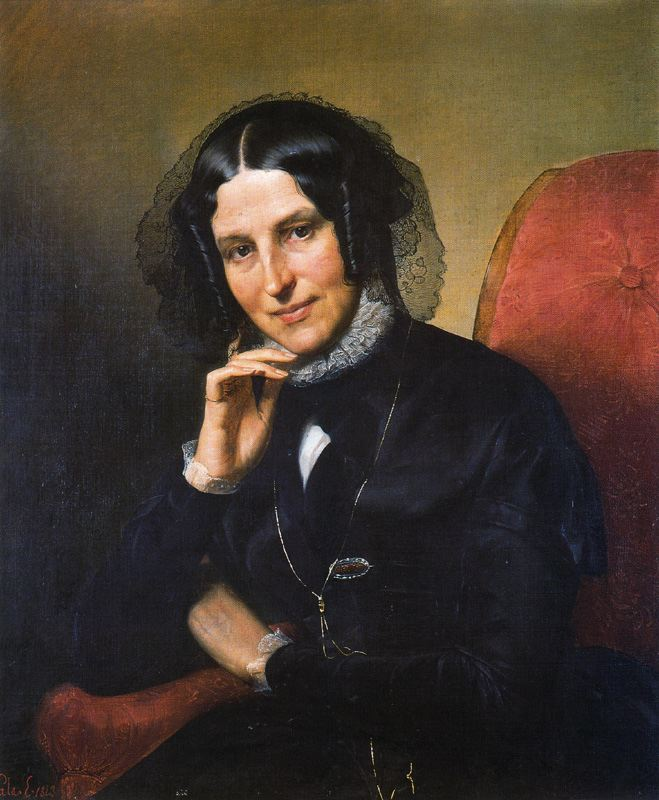
Portrait of Ernesta Legnani Bisi by Eliseo Sala, private collection, 1843

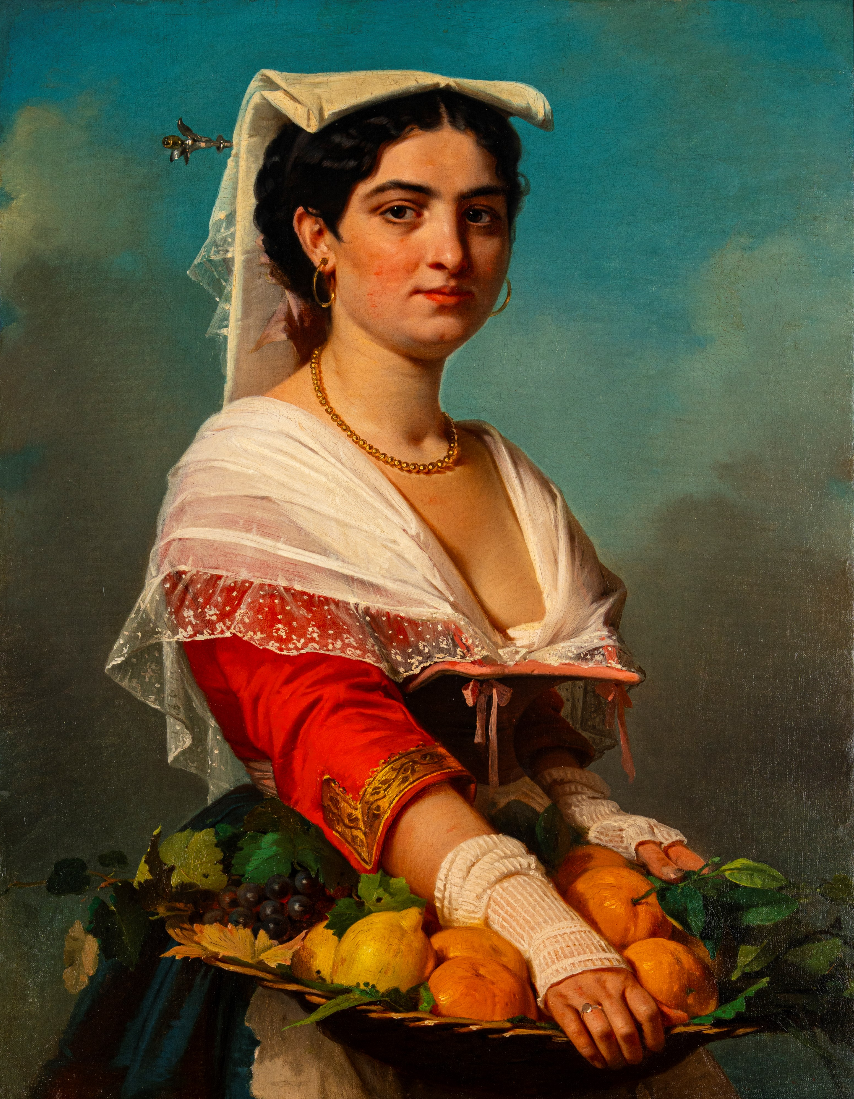
Peasant woman from Albano (surroundings of Rome), 1868

Eliseo Sala (2 January 1813–24 June 1879) was an Italian painter.

Sala was born in Milan, and a student between 1832 and 1838 at the Brera Academy under Luigi Sabatelli. He went to Venice and then in Rome, where he arrived in 1840 and became friends with Francesco Coghetti. He was not only a dedicated artist of genre paintings and historical subjects, but especially in painting realistic portraits in which he excelled and had a good reputation. Many of his works are preserved in several national museums including the Modern Art Gallery and the Pinacoteca di Brera, both in Milan. Sala died in Triuggio on 24 June 1879.

== Sources ==
- Eliseo Sala Brief Bio (in Italian)
- Works of Eliseo Sala (in Italian)
- Works of Eliseo Sala
