= Busi (given name) =

Busi is a South African feminine given name, a short name for Busiswa, Busisiwe or Sibusiswe. It may refer to the following notable people:

- Busi Kheswa, South African oral historian and lesbian, gay, bisexual, and transgender activist
- Busi Mhlongo (1947–2010), South African singer, dancer and composer
- Busi Ncube (born 1963), Zimbabwean musician and singer
