= Luigi Busi =

Italian painter

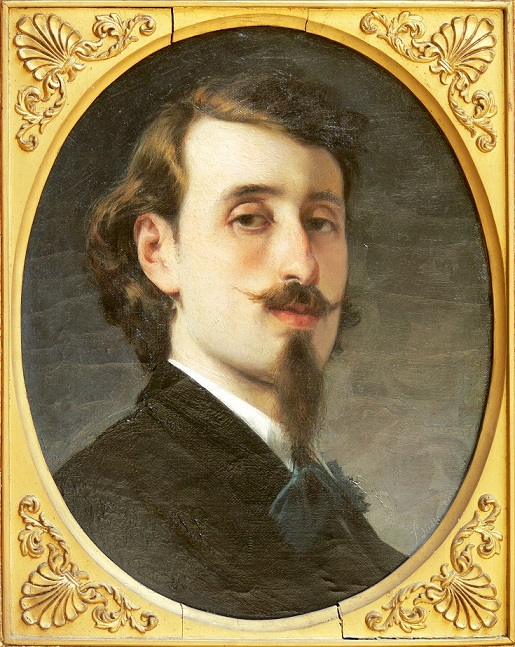
Portrait of Luigi Busi

Luigi Busi (May 7, 1837 – May 31, 1884) was an Italian painter born in Bologna.

== Biography ==
Busi studied at the Academy of Fine Arts of Bologna, though by 1868, he is documented to be in Milan. He was named academic professor at the Bolognese Academy in 1871. In 1876, he was named honorary associate of the Brera Academy. His early training was in an environment characterized by Realist depictions.

Busi painted many fresco commissions in Bologna, including the decoration of the Room contiguous to the Council Hall in the Palazzo Comunale. Here he frescoed the Annexation of Emilia. At the Collegio Venturoli, where Busi himself at one time studied, he painted Last moments of Francesco Foscari (1862), for the municipal theater, he painted frescoes (1866) in collaboration with the painter Luigi Samoggia. He painted the altar frescoes depicting the Martyrdom of Saints Vitale and Agricola (1874) for the church of Sant Vitale and Agricola. Busi also painted in a chapel of the church of the Madonna del Soccorso and an Adoration of the Magi in the chapel of Villa Hercolani at Belpoggio. At Imola, he decorated with frescoes the staircase of the Palazzo Pighini, and the dome of the Sanctuary of Piratello. In the latter work, he was assisted by Alessandro Guardassoni.

Among his historical canvases are: Confession of Isabella Orsini (1866); Torquato Tasso and Cardinal Cinzio Aldobrandini at the Convent of Sant'Onofrio, Rome (1867); and The last moments of Niccolò de' Lapi. Among his genre works are: Un'ora d'ozio in villa, Una debolezza femminile, Le gioie materne (1872), Il paggio e la duchessa, Compiacenze materne (1875), La visita alla puerpera, Le due madri (exhibited in Paris, 1878), Tutti hanno il loro nido, Il giorno onomastico di Bebé, La Parisina, and Conseguenze di un matrimonio celebrato col solo rito religioso (1875, Brera).

Busi died in Bologna in 1884.
