= Michele Bisi =

Italian painter (1788–1874)

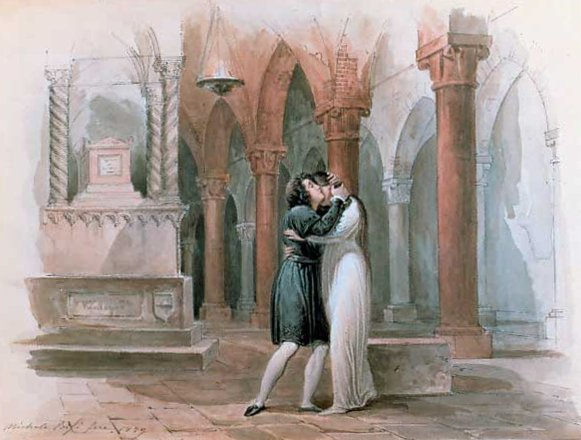
Watercolor painting by Michele Bisi of Giulia Grisi and Giuditta Pasta in a production of Giulietta e Romeo (Vaccai) in Florence, 1829

Michele Bisi (18 April 1788 – 26 December 1874) was an Italian engraver and painter born in the Republic of Genoa. His work is identified with the schools of Francesco Bartolozzi, Francesco Rosaspina, and Giuseppe Longhi.

Bisi first distinguished himself by the publication of the Pinacoteca del Palazzo Reale delle Scienze e delle Arti di Milano for which he was aided by his brother's wife, Ernesta Legnani Bisi, who, like her husband Giuseppe Bisi, had studied under Giuseppe Longhi. The text was completed by Robustiano Gironi. In 1819 he undertook a series of engravings from the paintings of Andrea Appiani, in which he was assisted by some of the best scholars of Longhi. His engraving of Venus Embracing Cupid was popular.

Subsequently, he made engravings of:

- The Virgin and Infant Christ enthroned attended by St. Anthony and St. Barbara, after Bernardino Luini.
- Andromeda and Perseus, after Guercino.
- Adoration of the Virgin, after Sassoferrato.
- Offering of the Magi, after Gaudenzio Ferrari.

Bisi also succeeded as a painter of landscapes. He died in Milan in 1874.
