= Antonio Raffaele Calliano =

Italian painter

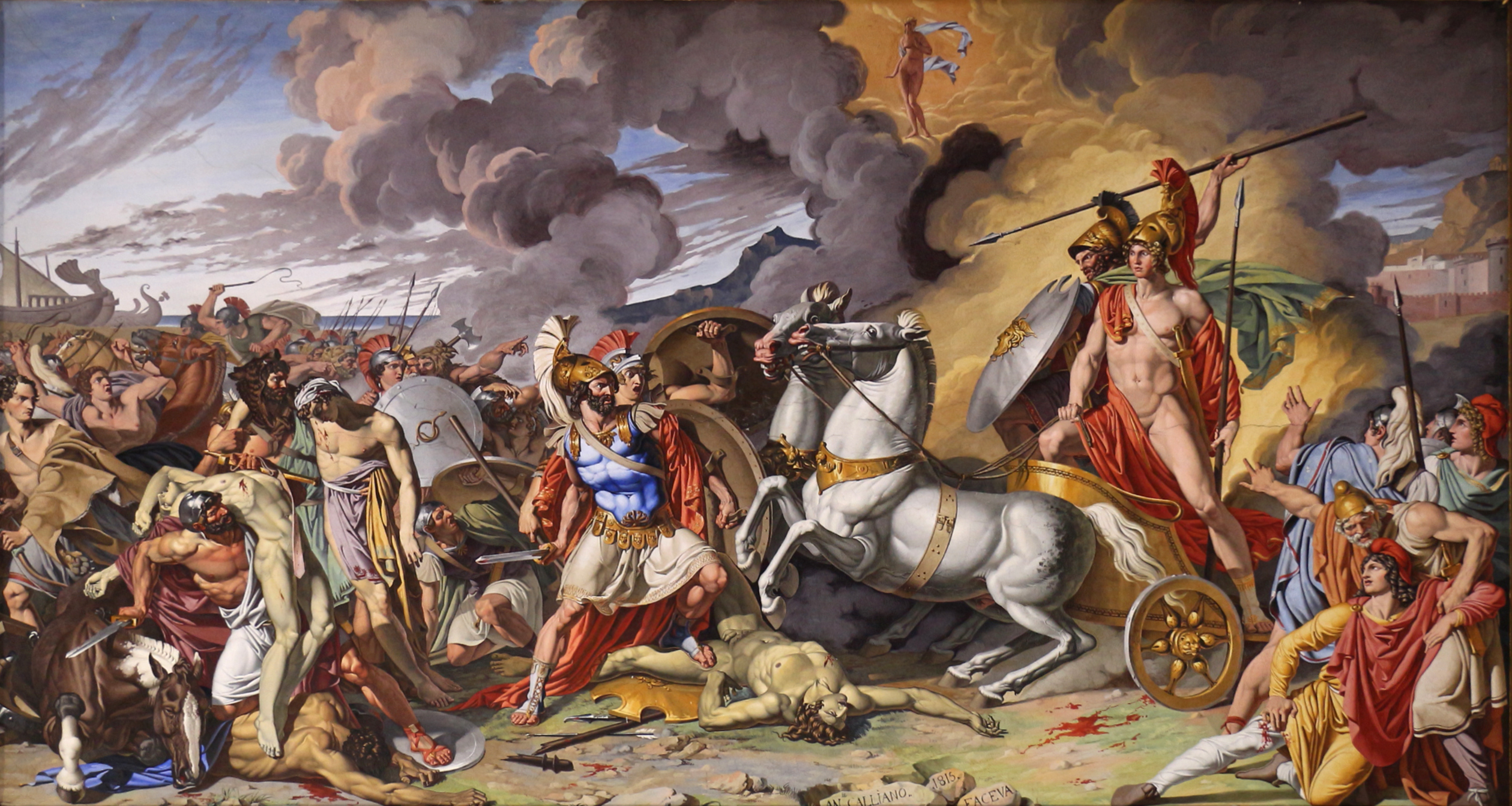
Achilles in his chariot rides over the body of the slain Hector, Reggia di Caserta

Antonio Raffaele Calliano (1785 – after 1824) was an Italian painter of the Neoclassical period, specializing in history and portraits.

== Biography ==
He was born in Muzzano in the province of Biella to a lawyer and later engineer, Bernardo. His brothers were also painters including Giovanni Battista (1775 – 1821) and Vittorio (born 1777). Giovanni Battista studied at what would become the Albertina Academy, and dedicated himself to illumination. He would later follow his brother to Madrid, where he died.

In 1804, Raffaele presented to the Viceroy a pencil drawing depicting the Battle of Marengo, and was awarded a stipend to study at the Accademia di San Luca in Rome. In 1805, he won a prize with the essay of Jesus forgives the Adultress, defeating among other contestants, Francesco Giangiacomo and Bartolomeo Pinelli. From Naples in 1815, Joachim Murat called Raffaele to paint an Achilles in his chariot rides over the body of the slain Hector for the throne room of the Royal Palace of Caserta. After the Bourbon restoration, he moved to paint in the royal court of Madrid, where he died. It was rumored, according to Roccavilla, that the restored Bourbon in Naples, paid for Raffaele to retouch the Caserta painting, altering the face of Achilles, previously modeled on Murat, to resemble his own.
