= Busi (surname) =

Busi is an Italian surname that may refer to the following notable people:

- Aldo Busi (born 1948), Italian writer and translator
- Alessia Busi (born 1994), Italian ice dancer
- Giambattista Busi (born 1968), Italian racing driver
- Giovanni Busi, an Italian painter active during the Renaissance
- Luigi Busi (1837–1884), Italian painter
- Maxime Busi (born 1999), Belgian football defender
