= Magdalen in the Desert =

Lost painting usually attributed to Correggio

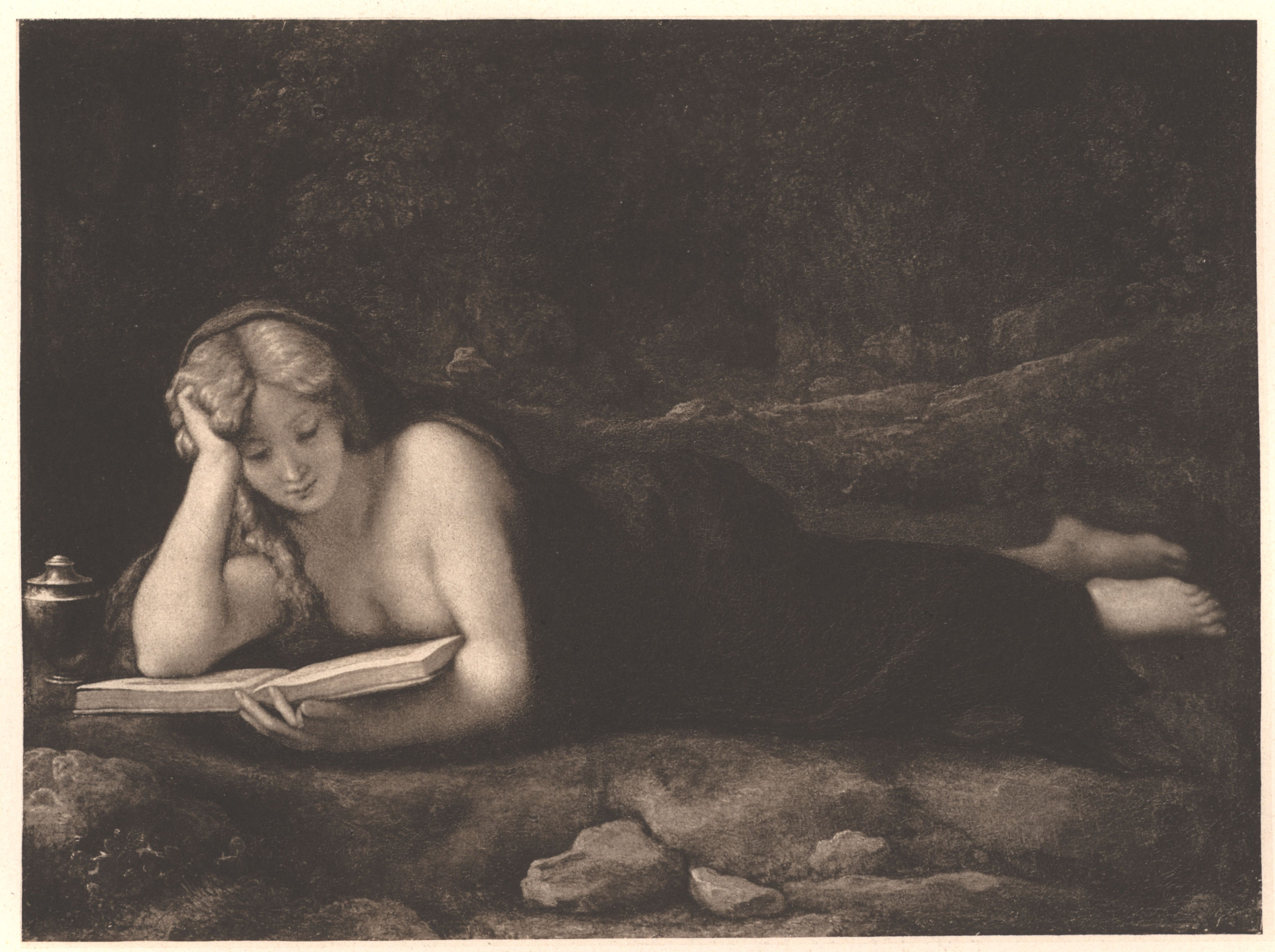
- Photogravure reproduction (c. 1897)
- Artist: Antonio da Correggio
- Medium: Oil on copper
- Subject: Mary Magdalen
- Dimensions: 28 cm × 38 cm (11 in × 15 in)
- Location: Lost

Magdalen in the Desert, also known as The Reading Magdalen, and The Magdalen Reading in a Cave, was an oil painting of uncertain date traditionally but disputedly attributed to Antonio da Correggio. The painting was last in the collection of the Gemäldegalerie Alte Meister in Dresden, but went missing after the Second World War.

== Subject ==
Aimé Giron distinguishes between two kinds of Magdalens in art:

I. the Repentant, emaciated, growing ugly, disfigured by tears and penitence at the end of her life, with a skull in her hand or before her eyes, not having had even—like the one sculptured in the Cathedral of Rouen—"for three times ten winters any other vesture than her long hair", according to Petrarch's verse; II. the Sinner, always young, always beautiful, always seductive, who has not lost any of her charms nor even of her coquetry, and with whom the Book of Life takes the place of the Death's Head.

This Magdalen belongs, he says, to the latter class.

== Appraisal ==
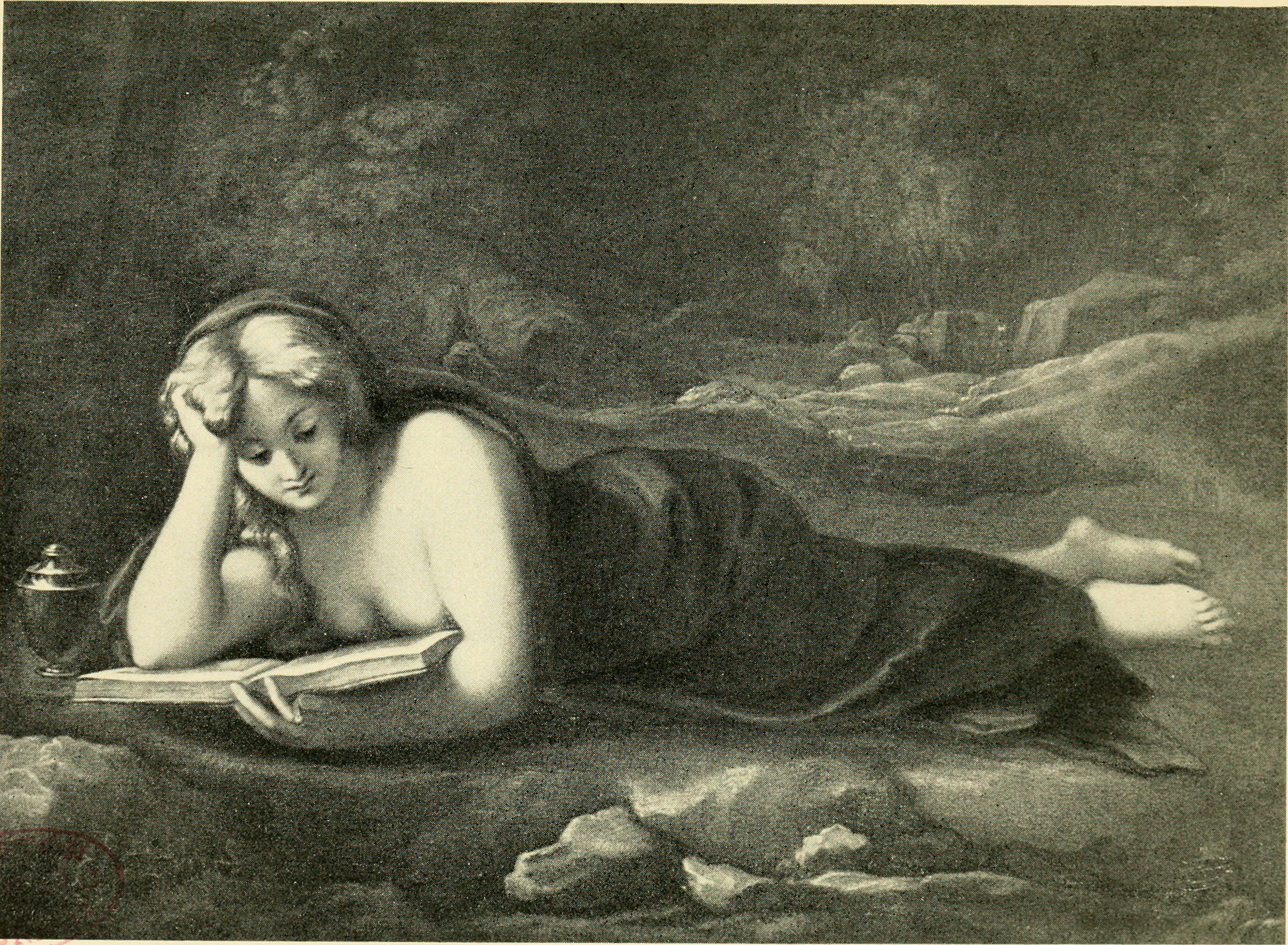
Photographic reproduction (1899)

According to Giron, "This Magdalen … holds the first place among the small Correggios." He gives the following ecphrasis:

In a solitary spot, but attractive with its verdure and rocks, on a grassy knoll the saint is stretched out at full length, with her shoulder, her bosom, her arms, and her feet adorably bare. A blue fabric drapes the rest of her body and forms a coquettish hood for her head and neck. Her flesh has a robust elegance of line. Leaning on her right elbow, her hand, half hidden in her hair, supports a charming and meditative head, while her other arm is slipped under an open manuscript. Her hair, long and blonde, according to legend—which she loves and still cares for because it once wiped the feet of her Saviour—falls in thick curls, or strays at will with a premeditated abandon. On the ground, to her right, stands the vase of perfumes of her first adoration; to the left are the stones of her supreme expiation.

What grace in her attitude! What beauty of form! She is thrown in with a rare happiness and painted with an exquisite delicacy of touch and tint. The blue drapery upon the green landscape defines her sufficiently without making her stand out too much, leaving the figure and the landscape to mingle without disturbing each other in skilful harmony. All of this is in most finished execution, a little elaborate, perhaps, and the expression of the face reflects the sweet, sad memory of the Beloved, whose Gospels she is reading, just as one reads again tender letters of the past.

== History ==
This work was executed for the Dukes of Este, who kept it in a silver frame studded with precious stones and used it as an ornament for their bedrooms, and when they travelled, they took it with them in a casket. When the King of Poland became its possessor, he gave it a second boxing of glass with lock and key. In 1788, this masterpiece having been stolen, 1,000 ducats were promised for its discovery, and, in consideration of that sum, the thief denounced himself. Cristofano Allori, the greatest Florentine painter of the Decadence, made an admired copy for the Offices.

== Attribution ==
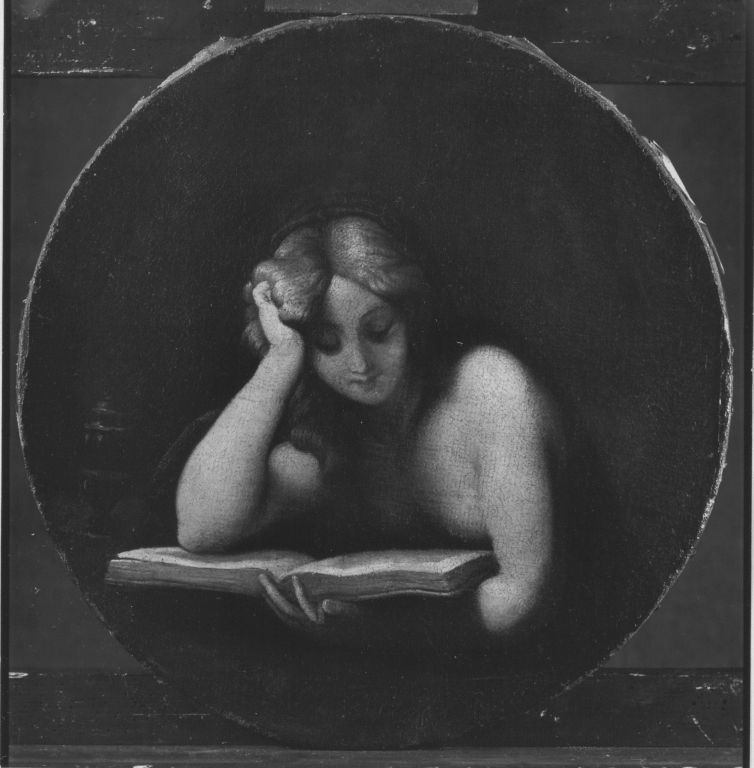
Penitent Magdalene Reading a Book. Copy, in the Staatsgalerie Aschaffenburg (probably 17th century)

This painting, for many years assigned to Correggio, was considered by some 19th century critics to be by some Flemish artist. Giovanni Morelli gave it as his opinion that the smooth and affected grace of the creation was due, not to any Italian painter, but to some Fleming of the end of the seventeenth or beginning of the eighteenth century. He further pointed out that no artist had painted upon copper before the end of the sixteenth century, and concluded by saying that a careful examination of the picture inclined him to attribute it to Adrien van der Werff, a master whose every characteristic appeared in the work, notably his colour, as in the crude dazzling blue of the drapery, his treatment of landscape, as in the miniature rendering of every stone and leaf, his peculiarities of type, as in the long nails, their edges catching the light. Even the surface cracks, he remarks, agree exactly with those in Adrien van der Werff's pictures.

Deferring, however, to some lingering doubt, he adds the following: "It may be, perhaps, that the picture was not painted by Van der Werff himself, but by some contemporary and fellow-countryman. In no case, however, can it be accepted as the work of an Italian; much less of an Italian who flourished in the first thirty years of the sixteenth century. It may, however, be a copy by some foreign artist of the seventeenth century, from an original of the school of the Carracci."

The picture at Dresden was also thought not improbably a copy of a lost work by Correggio. Numerous copies of this work exist elsewhere under Correggio's name, or as school-pictures (e.g. Palazzo Corsini, Rome).

== Provenance ==
- Formerly in the Este collection in Modena;
- Sold 1745–46 to Augustus III of Saxony;
- Afterwards in Dresden;
- Gone missing after the Second World War;
- Lost.

== Sources ==
- Brinton, Selwyn (1900). Correggio. Williamson, G. C. (ed.). The Great Masterpieces in Painting and Sculpture. London: George Bell & Sons. pp. 130–32.
- Moore, Thomas Sturge (1906). Correggio. London: Duckworth and Co.; New York: Charles Scribner's Sons. p. 154.
- Morelli, Giovanni (1907). Italian Painters: Critical Studies of Their Works. Translated by Ffoulkes, Constance Jocelyn. London: John Murray. pp. 163–65.
- "Print | La Maddalena". The British Museum. Accessed 11 July 2022.
