= Luigi Bisi =

Italian painter (1814–1886)

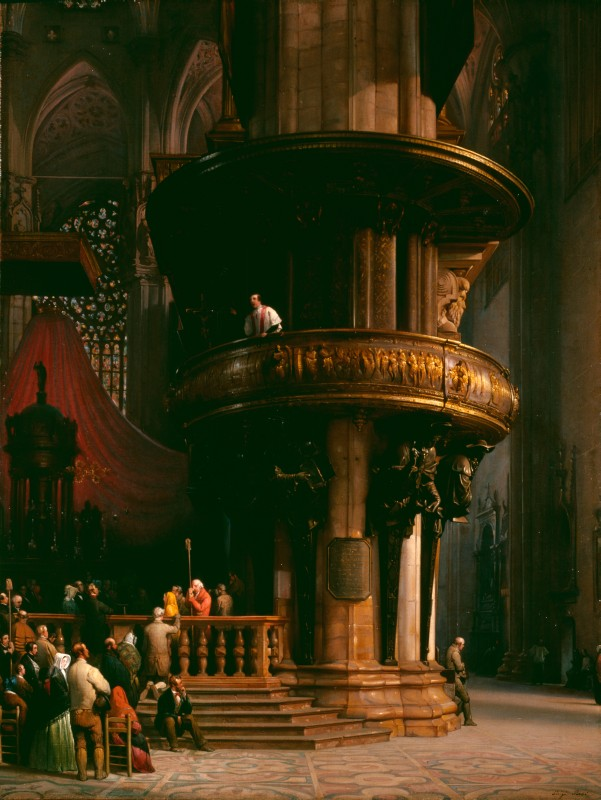
- Sermon in the Duomo di Milano (1837)
- Born: 10 May 1814; Milan, Kingdom of Lombardy–Venetia
- Died: 11 November 1886 (aged 72); Milan
- Known for: painting, architecture

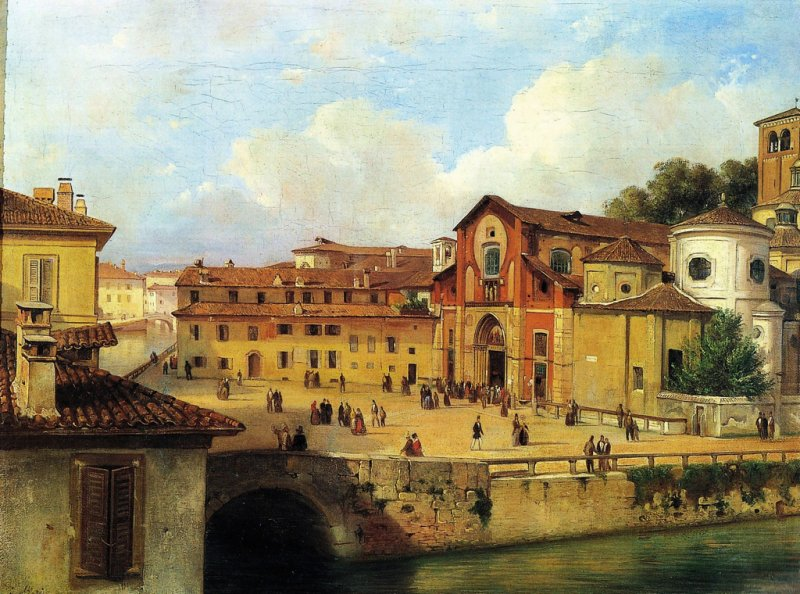
Piazza San Marco, Milan (1835)

Luigi Bisi (10 May 1814 – 11 November 1886) was an Italian architect and painter. He was the most notable member of an artistic family.

== Life ==
He was born in Milan on 10 May 1814, the son of the painter Michele Bisi. He studied under his father and his uncle Giuseppe Bisi, and then under Francesco Durelli at the Accademia di Belle Arti di Brera. It is sometimes suggested that he also studied under Giovanni Migliara.

Bisi succeeded Durelli as teacher of perspective at the Accademia, and taught there for more than 30 years. In 1879 he became president of that academy.

He died in Milan on 11 November 1886.

== Work ==
As a young man Bisi painted airy vedute, but most of his paintings are of interiors, principally churches, and most particularly the Duomo di Milano, which he claimed to have painted eighty-seven times.

His interest in perspective led him to architecture. From 1857 he worked with Giovanni Brocca (1803–1876), Friedrich von Schmidt and Giuseppe Pestagalli on the long-drawn-out restoration of the Basilica di Sant'Ambrogio. His plans for extensions to the Palazzo dei Giureconsulti were exhibited in 1877.

Bisi designed the pedestal for the bronze copy of Antonio Canova's statue of Napoleon as Mars the Peacemaker which from 1859 stood in the main courtyard of Palazzo Brera, home of the Accademia di Belle Arti di Brera and the Pinacoteca di Brera. The base is in granite and Carrara marble, with bronze decorations, and was inaugurated in 1864.
