= Lino Mannocci =

Italian painter, printmaker and writer (1945–2021)

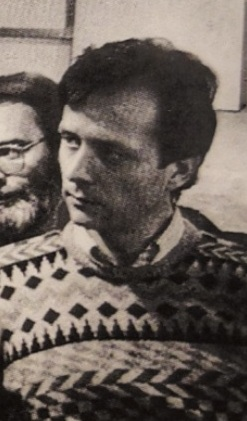
Image of Lino Mannocci Metacosa

Lino Mannocci (13 April 1945 – 31 March 2021) was an Italian painter, printmaker and writer.

== Life ==
He was born in Viareggio, Italy, and moved to London in 1968. Between 1971 and 1976, he studied at Camberwell College of Arts and as a postgraduate at the Slade School of Fine Art in London. From 1976, Mannocci returned annually to a little Italian hamlet in the hills between Lucca and Viareggio.

Mannocci died in London on 31 March 2021, at the age of 75.

== Career ==
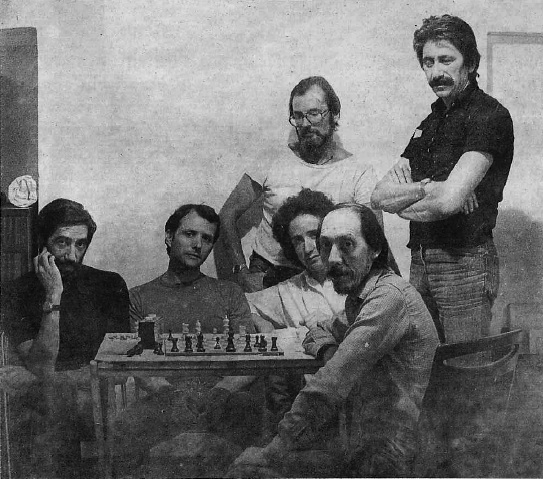
Photo of La Metacosa, 1979. (seated) Sandro Luporini, Lino Mannocci, Bernardino Luino & Gianfranco Ferroni, (standing) Giorgio Tonelli & Giuseppe Bartolini

In the early 1980s, Mannocci was a co-founder of the movement La Metacosa and was closely involved in all the group's exhibitions and activities. His first museum exhibition was in 1984 at the Hack-Museum in Wilhelm-Hack-Museum in Ludwigshafen, Germany. During the 1990s, he exhibited his work in San Francisco, New York, London, Milan, Florence and Bergamo. In 2004, his recent paintings were included in the exhibition curated by Philippe Daverio at the Spazio Oberdan in Milan called Fenomenologia della Metacosa – 7 artisti nel 1979 a Milano e 25 anni dopo, and, in 2005, he had a one-person show entitled Let there be smoke at the Museo Hendrik Christian Andersen in Rome. In 2006, he exhibited in Delhi and Mumbai in India, and, in 2007, he curated an exhibition at the Galleria Ceribelli in Bergamo called Gli amici pittori di Londra, a homage to painting and friendship. On the occasion of his exhibition in 2010 of monotypes at the Fitzwilliam Museum in Cambridge, Clouds and Myths, Mannocci curated an exhibition on the theme of the Annunciation, The Angel and the Virgin: A Brief History of the Annunciation. The Cartiere Vannucci in Milan exhibited his paintings in 2012. In October, he exhibited his work in New York at Jill Newhouse Gallery. He had an exhibition at Galleria San Fedele in Milan, E l’angelo partì da lei, in 2014. In the following year, 2015, he presented a solo exhibition of recent works at the Galleria Nazionale d’Arte Moderna di Palazzo Pitti in Florence. In May, an invitation to commemorate the 8th centenary of Magna Carta at Temple Church in London resulted in a show of monotypes on parchment. In June, he exhibited a group of treated postcards at the Estorick Collection in London, Shaping the Image, which concerned the main protagonists of the Futurists movement. In 2017, Mannocci participated in the "Shared Sacred Sites" project showing work in the Macedonian Museum of Contemporary Art in Thessaloniki, Greece. The following year the exhibition travelled to The Graduate Centre CUNY, New York. In July 2019, he curated an exhibition of Gino Severini's work at the Museo Novecento, Florence, and in September, he had a solo show of works relating to the theme of the wedding of Gino Severini and Jeanne Fort in 1913. In December 2019, he exhibited works on the occasion of the 40th anniversary of the Metacosa.

== Gli Amici Pittori di Londra ==
Gli Amici Pittori di Londra (My Painter Friends in London) was the title given to an exhibition of work by Mannocci and his British artist friends held in 2007 at the Galleria Ceribelli in Bergamo, Italy. The artists – both past and present – share between them various degrees of contact based on friendship and example, as well as occasional links through galleries and exhibitions in London and elsewhere. The success of the initial exhibition generated other shows by the group in subsequent years. In 2008, Genius Loci at the Galleria Ceribelli, in 2010, Another Country at the Estorick Collection, London, and in 2015, Vital Signs at Clifford Chance, London, which also travelled to the Fondazione Bottari Lattes in Monforte d'Alba, Italy.

== Collections ==
Mannocci's work is in the collections of the British Museum in London, Altonaer Museum in Hamburg, Wilhelm-Hack-Museum in Ludwigshafen, Musée Jenisch in Vevey, Mead Art Museum in Amherst and Fitzwilliam Museum in Cambridge.

== Publications ==
In 1988, he wrote the catalogue raisonné of the graphic work of Claude Lorrain for Yale University Press. On the occasion of the 2007 exhibition, Gli amici pittori di Londra, he wrote the accompanying catalogue, published by Lubrina Editore, Bergamo. In 2008, following a visit to New Delhi and Mumbai, he wrote Madre India, Padre Barbiere, a text on the experience of the journey and personal memories, alongside photographs of Indian barbers, for Skira Imprint. In 2010, he curated and wrote the catalogue for the exhibition, The Angel and the Virgin: A Brief History of the Annunciation, at the Fitzwilliam Museum, Cambridge. Also in 2010, as part of the catalogue for the exhibition, Another Country at the Estorick Collection in London, he wrote an essay, "De Chirico, Carra and the Metaphysical Years". In 2019, he wrote Scene da un matrimonio fuțurista: Gino Severini sposa Jeanne Fort a Parigi nel 1913, published by affinità elettive, Ancona.
