= Pietro Anderloni =

Italian engraver

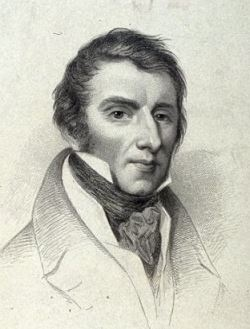
Pietro Anderloni; by Ferdinand Joubert

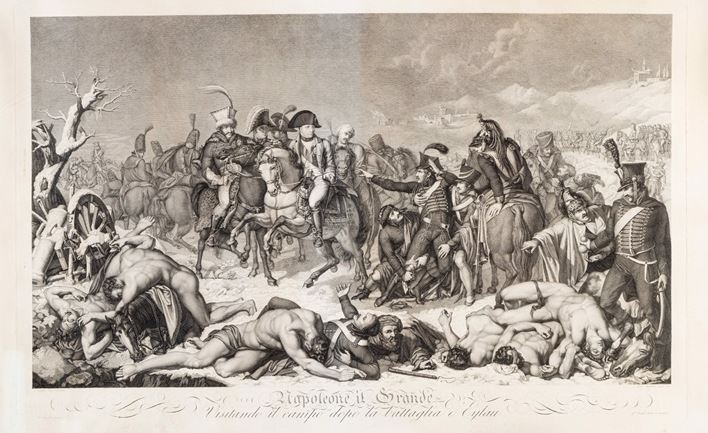
Napoleon after the Battle of Eylau

Pietro Anderloni (12 October 1785, Brescia – 13 October 1849, Galbiate) was an Italian Neoclassical engraver.

== Biography ==
He was the youngest of seven children born to Giovanni Battista Anderloni, a wealthy farmer, and Anna Maria née Ronco. His brother, Faustino was also an engraver. He began by studying drawing, with the intention of becoming a painter, but when Faustino moved to Pavia to take a position as an art teacher, Pietro joined him there. He continued to study drawing and painting, and learned copper engraving from his brother. His first creations in that medium were copies of anatomical drawings for the works of Antonio Scarpa. In 1803, he produced his first independent work.

To perfect his technique, he went to Milan, where he studied with Giuseppe Longhi. He spent nine years there, mostly as an assistant to Longhi, but continued to produce his own engravings. A notable exception came when he was entrusted with a commission from Eugène de Beauharnais, the Viceroy of the Kingdom of Italy. It was to be a depiction of Napoleon, visiting camp after the Battle of Eylau. The engraving was based on a painting by Antonio Raffaele Calliano, and won a gold medal for Anderloni in 1810.

He eventually specialized in portraits, after Andrea Appiani, Antonio Canova, Carlo Porta, and many others. He also created numerous copies of works by the Old Masters; notably The Expulsion of Heliodorus from the Temple, by Raphael. In 1831, he succeeded Longhi as Professor of Engraving at the Accademia di Brera. In 1835, he was elected a fourth class, corresponding member of the Royal Institute of the Netherlands.
