= Ernesta Legnani Bisi =

Italian artist (1788–1859)

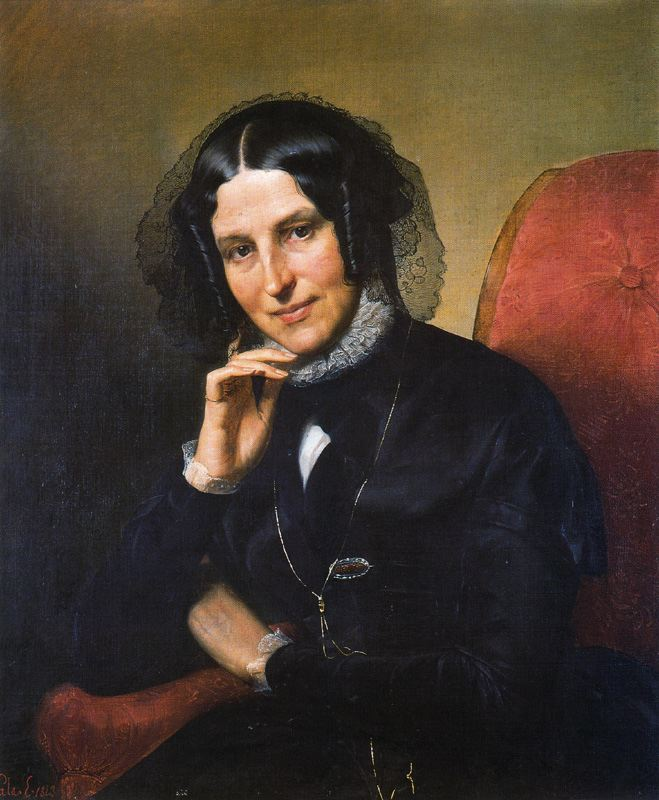
- Portrait of Ernesta Legnani Bisi by Eliseo Sala, private collection, 1843
- Born: June 18, 1788; Milan
- Died: November 13, 1859 (aged 71); Milan
- Known for: Painting, Engraving

Ernesta Legnani Bisi (June 18, 1788 – November 13, 1859) was an Italian painter and engraver.

== Life and work ==
Born in Milan, she became a student of the Brera Academy, where she studied under the direction of Giuseppe Longhi. She was recognized as a brilliant student, and won the prize in 1810 for the design of the Academy. In 1811 she married Giuseppe Bisi from Genoa, a painter and professor of the Academy, by whom she had five children. She was a strong supporter of Italian independence, and a friend of many women of the Carbonari (the so-called charcoal burners), such as the painter Bianca Milesi. In his poem "Dodes sonitt all'abaa Giovan", Carlo Porta remembered her: "È in tra i donn la Milesi, la Legnana" ("Among the women, Milesi, Legnana").

In her artistic activity Bisi devoted herself mainly to portraits. In the field of engraving on copper she reproduced five works of Francesco Francia, Marco d'Oggiono, Giacomo Cavedone, Palma il Giovane and Paris Bordone for the Pinacoteca di Brera in Milan, and the portraits of Maria Gaetana Agnesi, Vittoria Colonna and Giovanni Battista Monteggia for the Lives and portraits of illustrious Italians. She also produced portraits in watercolor. Two of her daughters went on to become painters as well: Antoinette (1813–1866) and Fulvia (1818–1911).

== Sources ==
- Lives and portraits of distinguished Italian, Padua, Typography Bettoni 1812
- Peter Zani, Encyclopedia methodical-rational critic of Fine Arts, 21 vols., Parma, Duke Typography, 1817-1824
- Augustine Mario Comanducci, Visual Dictionary of painters and engravers modern Italian, I, Milan, SA Grafitalia already Pythian & Pizzi, 1945, p. 72

Media related to Ernesta Legnani Bisi at Wikimedia Commons
