= Busi Kheswa =

South African LGBT activist

- Citizenship: South Africa
- Occupation: Activist
- Organization(s): Gay and Lesbian Archives (GALA); Lesbian and Gay Equality Project
- Known for: Leader
- Notable work: Forum for Empowerment of Women (FEW)

Busi Kheswa is a South African LGBT activist and oral historian. She is most notable for directing the Forum for the Empowerment of Women (FEW). which works to promote and protect the rights of LGBT women in South Africa.

== Career ==
Kheswa is a member in multiple organizations that are involved in LGBT rights in South Africa, including the Gay and Lesbian Archives (GALA) and Lesbian and Gay Equality Project (LGEP) as well as FEW. GALA is an organization that records the struggles and histories of LGBT South Africans, and uses their stories for documentaries which challenge homophobia and promote gay rights. Kheswa was in charge of acquiring histories for the visual collections put together by GALA, as well as contributing to public education projects. The LGEP is an activists' group that works on improving the legislation to ensure the freedom of LGBT South Africans.

As a director for the FEW foundation, Kheswa's work has been instrumental in lobbying for protection against hate crimes, including corrective rapes against women, which happen routinely and often go unpunished, despite being in opposition to South African law which states that LGBT people have fair and equal rights. Women often face physical torture, rape, and even death. The FEW was established in 2002 in Johannesburg, and uses a variety of tools to increase the recognition of gay rights including leadership programs to encourage people to stand up for themselves and their communities, organization of campaigns that lobby for hate crime legislation, and health rights projects.

== Personal life ==
Kheswa is also an elder at Hope and Unity Metropolitan Community Church, which is Africa's first openly gay congregation.
