= Bernardino Luino =

Italian painter and etcher (born 1951)

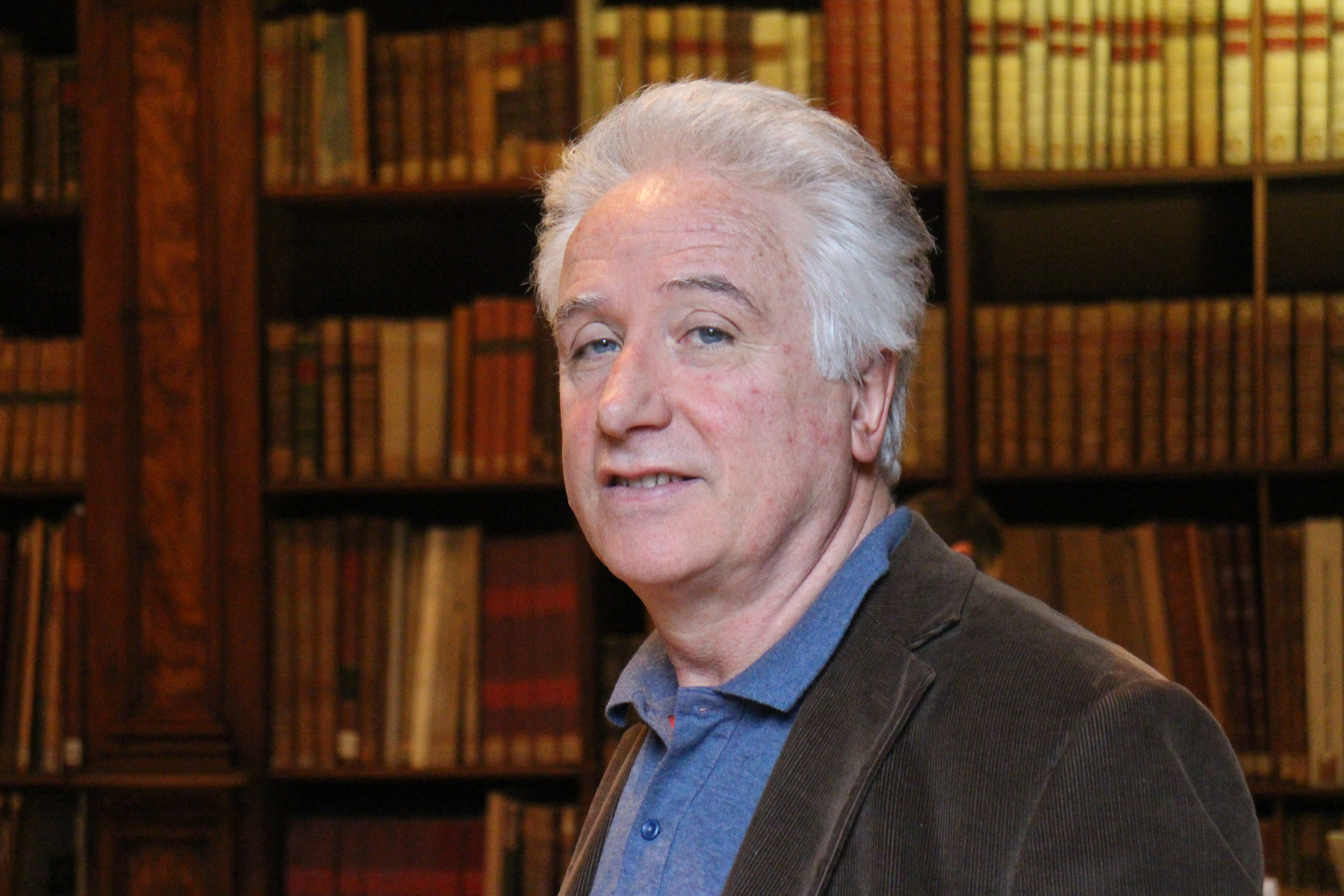
Bernardino Luino

Bernardino Luino (born 27 March 1951) is an Italian painter and etcher. He is one of the founders of the group La Metacosa and currently teaches at the Accademia di Belle Arti di Brera in Milan.

== Biography ==
Luino was born in Latina, Italy. In 1971 he enrolled in the Accademia di Belle Arti in Rome where his teachers included Alberto Ziveri and Franco Gentilini. He then moved to the Accademia in Florence in 1973, where, under Alberto Manfredi, he produced his first engravings, discovering a medium he would continue to work with throughout his career. His earliest mature works were exhibited in Florence in 1975, in the artist's first solo show.

In 1976, Bernardino Luino moved to Milan, where he met Gianfranco Ferroni. In 1979, Bernardino Luino, together with Giuseppe Bartolini, Gianfranco Ferroni, Sandro Luporini, Lino Mannocci and Giorgio Tonelli, founded the group La Metacosa. The group exhibited together from 1979 to 1983.

In 1982, Milan's gallery Il Fante di Spade held a solo exhibition of Bernardino Luino's works, presented by Franco Solmi, at the time Director of the Museo Giorgio Morandi in Bologna. For the first time, the interior scenes that would become one of the central motifs in the artist's oeuvre were displayed.

Over the following years, Bernardino Luino's paintings were exhibited at the XXIX, XXXI and XXXII Biennale Nazionale d’arte, while his etchings were presented at the IV, V and VI Triennale dell’incisione in Milan (Palazzo della Permanenente), and at the exhibition Grafica italiana contemporanea, organized in 1982 by the Quadriennale Nazionale d’arte in Rome.

In 1985 the Gallery Henoch held Bernardino Luino's first solo show in New York, which was followed by two more solo shows in 1988 and 1994. During the solo show of 1988, the great American Hollywood director Billy Wilder acquired one of Bernardino Luino's paintings, declaring, in a letter sent to the artist, "I love your stuff". In 1988 and 2002, Bernardino Luino's works were included in the Armory Show.

Between 1990 and 2000, three important solo shows were dedicated to the artist in Milan. In 1992, the Galleria Appiani Arte Trentadue curated the exhibition Dipinti Recenti, presented by Maurizio Fagiolo dell’Arco. On that occasion, Bernadino Luino's nudes were exhibited for the first time. In 1998, it followed in the same gallery the retrospective Bernardino Luino: dipinti e tecniche miste, 1987-1998, with catalogue published by Skira. In 2003, at the Galleria Merieschi, Vittorio Sgarbi presented La luce di Luino.

His works featured in some of the most important collective exhibitions to have been curated on the subject of Italian contemporary painting. In 1999, Luino's paintings were exhibited as part of the show 2000 Elogio della Bellezza/De Metaphisica, curated by Maurizio Fagiolo dell’Arco. In 2000, Philippe Daverio reunited the artists of La Metacosa in the landmarking exhibition Fenomenologia della Metacosa: 7 artisti nel 1979 a Milano e venticinque anni dopo. In 2007, Vittorio Sgarbi invited Luino to participate to the exhibition Arte Italiana. 1986-2007 Pittura and, that same year, his works were included in the exhibition Morandi e la natura morta oggi in Italia, curated by Marilena Pasquali.

In 2011, Bernardino Luino is called to exhibit at the 54th Venice Biennale, Italian Pavillon, with a presentation by Quirino Principe.
