= Giuseppe Bisi =

Italian painter (1787–1869)

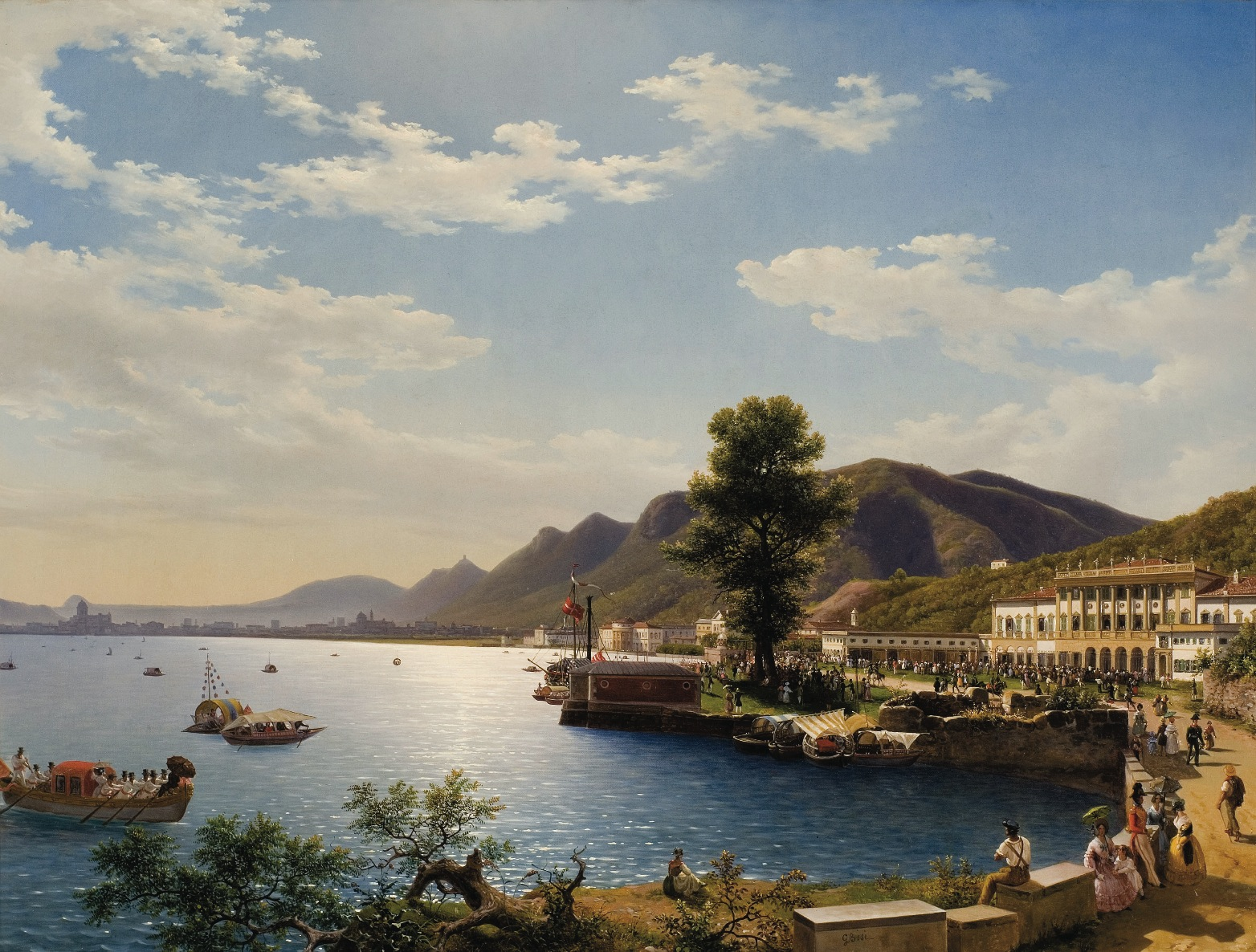
- Giuseppe Bisi, 1838: Villa Olmo in Como
- Born: April 10, 1787; Genoa, Republic of Genoa
- Died: 28 October 1869 (aged 82); Varese, Kingdom of Italy
- Known for: Painting

Giuseppe Bisi (10 April 1787 – 28 October 1869) was an Italian painter, mainly of landscapes in a Romantic style.

In 1829, he traveled to Rome, and painted landscapes in Lazio. He returned to Milan and in 1838, was named professor of landscape painter for the Accademia di Brera. He was the brother of the painter Michele Bisi, and married the painter Ernesta Legnani; their daughter Fulvia Bisi trained as a painter with her father. His nephew Luigi became a prominent painter. Among his followers was Roberto Garavaglia (died 1846) and Gaetano Gariboldi (died 1857).

== Works ==
- Veduta del porto di Genoa (1826)
- Veduta di Castel Gandolfo (1830)
- Orlando e Rodomonte
- Landscape with bathers
- Veduta di Torno (1860)

== Sources ==
- Opere di G.Bisi
- Milano, Galleria d’Arte Moderna
- Derived from Italian Wikipedia site
