= Giuseppe Longhi =

Italian painter (1766–1831)

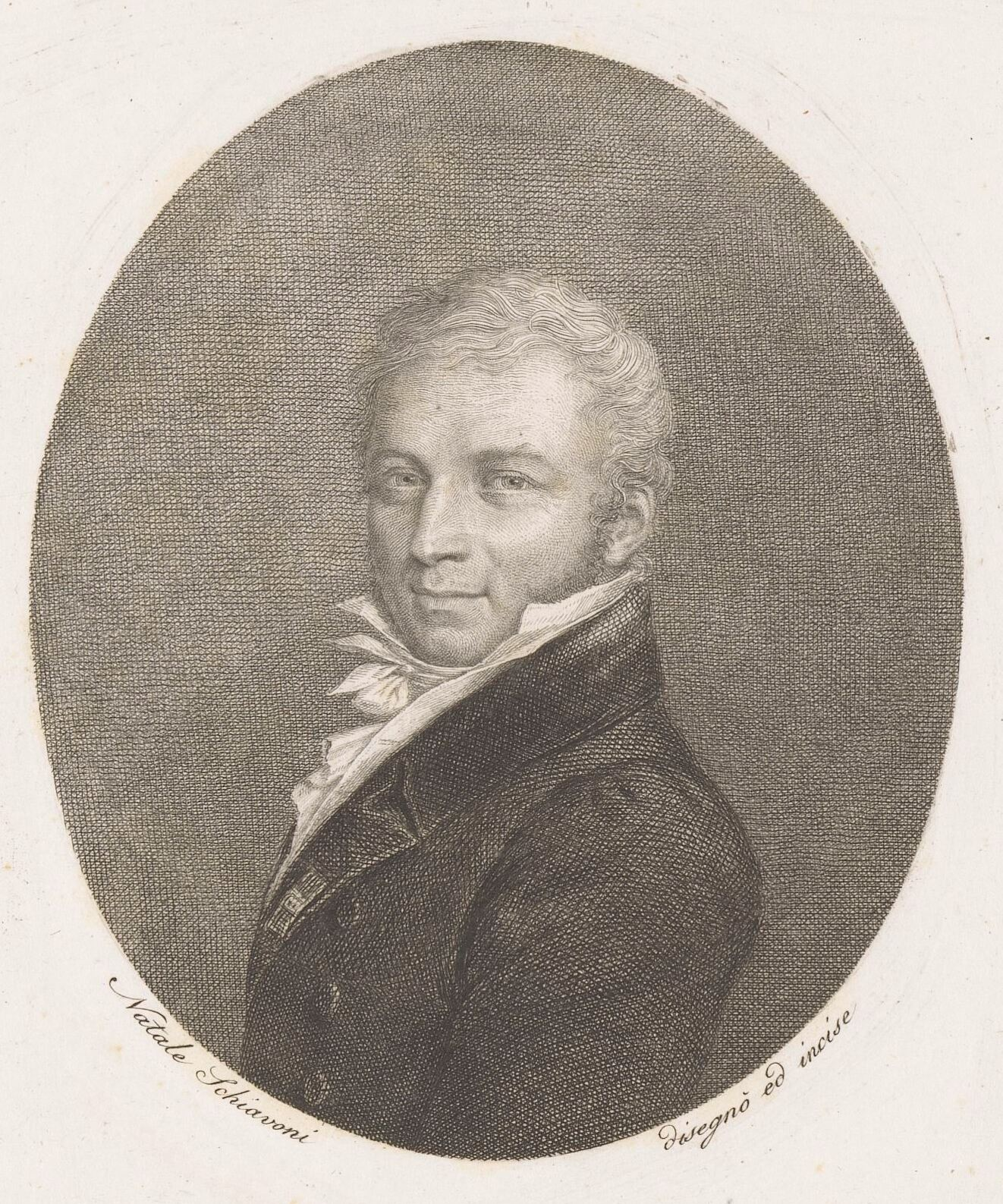
Giuseppe Longhi (date unknown); by Natale Schiavoni

Giuseppe Maria Longhi (13 October 1766, Monza – 2 January 1831, Milan) was an Italian painter and engraver, in the Neo-Classical style.

== Biography ==
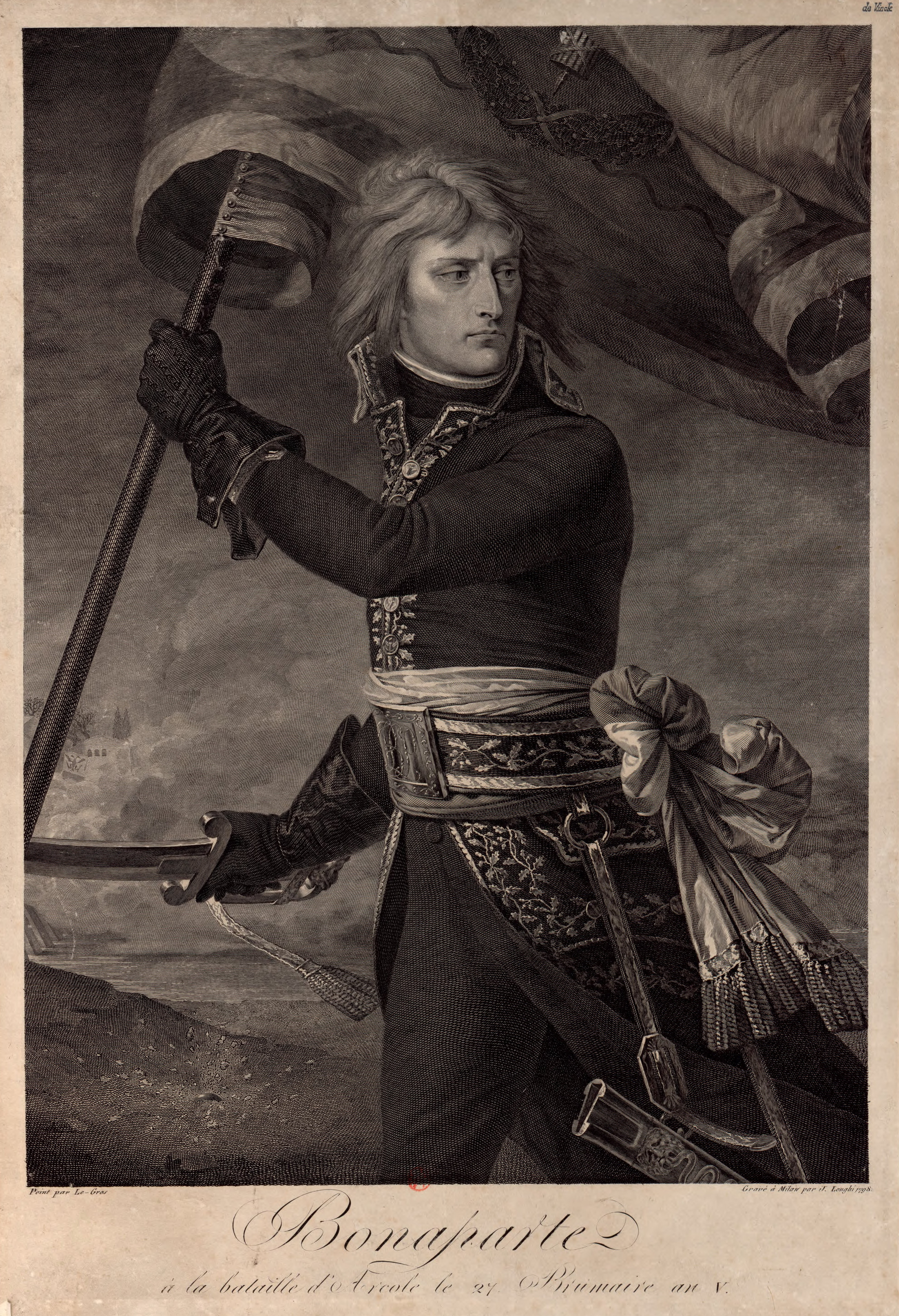
Bonaparte at the Pont d'Arcole, after Gros (1797)

He was born to Carlo Francesco Longhi, a silk merchant and antiques dealer, and his wife, Cecilia née Caronni. His initial studies took place in the seminaries of Celana, Monza and Milan. His teachers included Antonio Mussi (1751-1810), the future Rector of the Biblioteca Ambrosiana, who noticed and encouraged his drawing skills. When he completed his studies in 1786, he went to work for his father, but continued to pursue his interests in art through self-study.

In 1790, the Accademia di Brera established an engraving school and offered scholarships. He was able to obtain one and settled in Milan. There, he studied with Giulio Traballesi. In 1792 Giocondo Albertolli, a professor at the Accademia, commissioned him to produce his first solo work; a burin engraving. That same year, he took a trip to Rome, where he studied anatomy.

After achieving technical mastery and making his reputation as a portraitist, he was appointed a professor of engraving at the Accademia in 1798. Three years later, he was called on to participate in the Consulte de Lyon; in return for an engraving of Napoleon he had made in 1797, from a painting by Antoine-Jean Gros, done at the artist's request. This was followed by a trip to Paris, in the company of Giuseppe Bossi and Francesco Rosaspina. There, he made lasting contacts with several famous French artists. When Napoleon arrived in Milan to be crowned King of Italy, Longhi was a guest at the ceremony. In 1810, he was named a Knight in the Order of the Iron Crown.

His successes enabled him to spend more time on projects of personal interest. The years 1818 to 1819 were devoted to a large copper plate depicting the Marriage of the Virgin. It was published in 1820. He also created copies of works by Raphael and Leonardo. Many of his final years were spent working on two plates of The Last Judgment by Michelangelo. Only a few print proofs survive. The year before his death he published La Calcografia, a book on copper engraving.

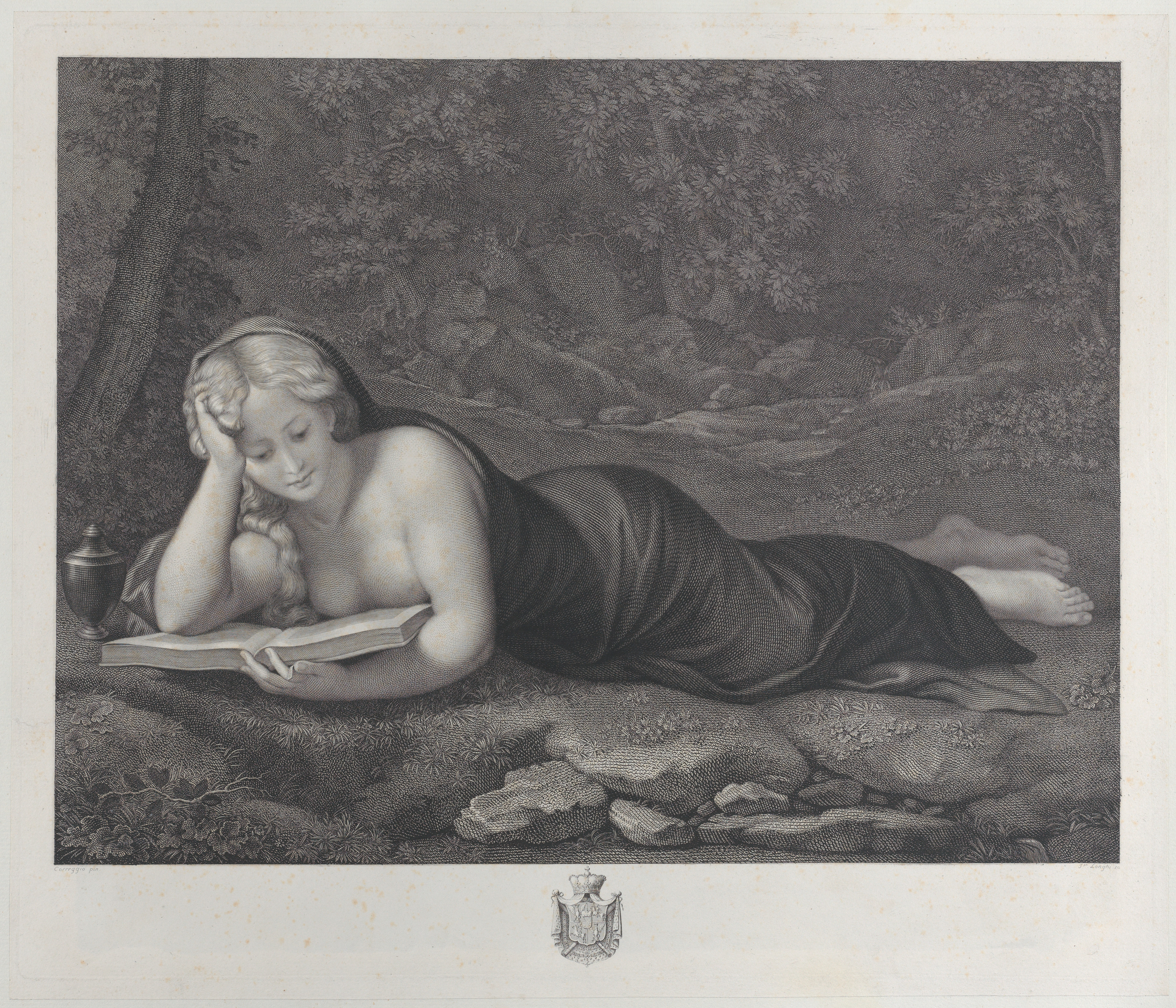
Magdalen in the Desert; after a painting attributed to Correggio (c.1810)

He died in 1831, at the age of sixty-four, from an apoplectic fit.

His numerous students included Pietro Anderloni, Benedetto Bordiga, Michele Bisi, Paolo Caronni, Giovita Garavaglia, Samuele Jesi, Ernesta Legnani Bisi and Giuseppe Marri. The largest collections of his prints are held by the Musei Civici di Monza and the Civica raccolta delle stampe Achille Bertarelli. A street in Milan has been named after him.
