= Cherubino Cornienti =

Italian painter (1816–1860)

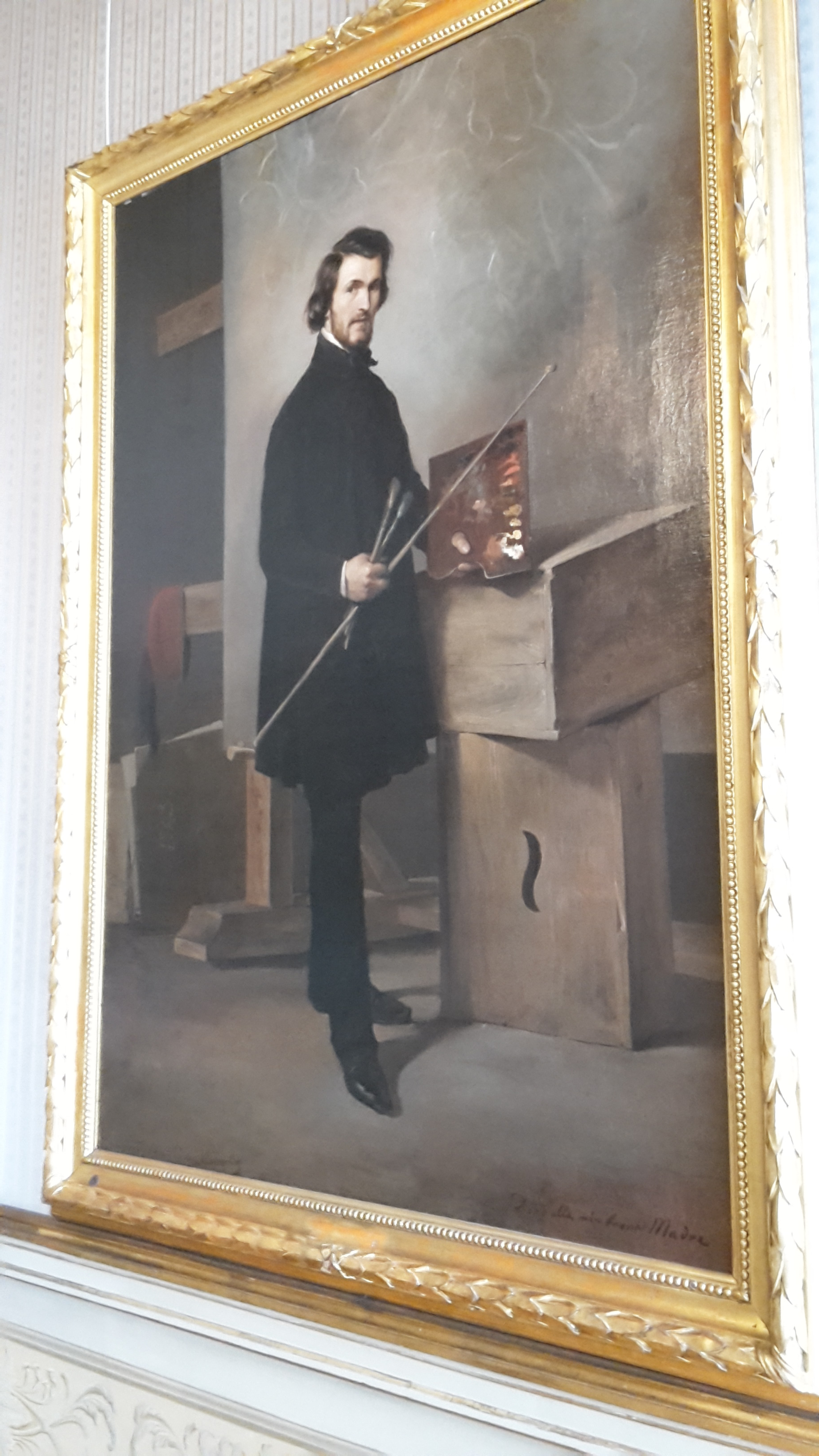

Cherubino Cornienti (March 25, 1816 – May 12, 1860) was an Italian painter, active in a Romantic style mainly in Northern Italy.

== Biography ==
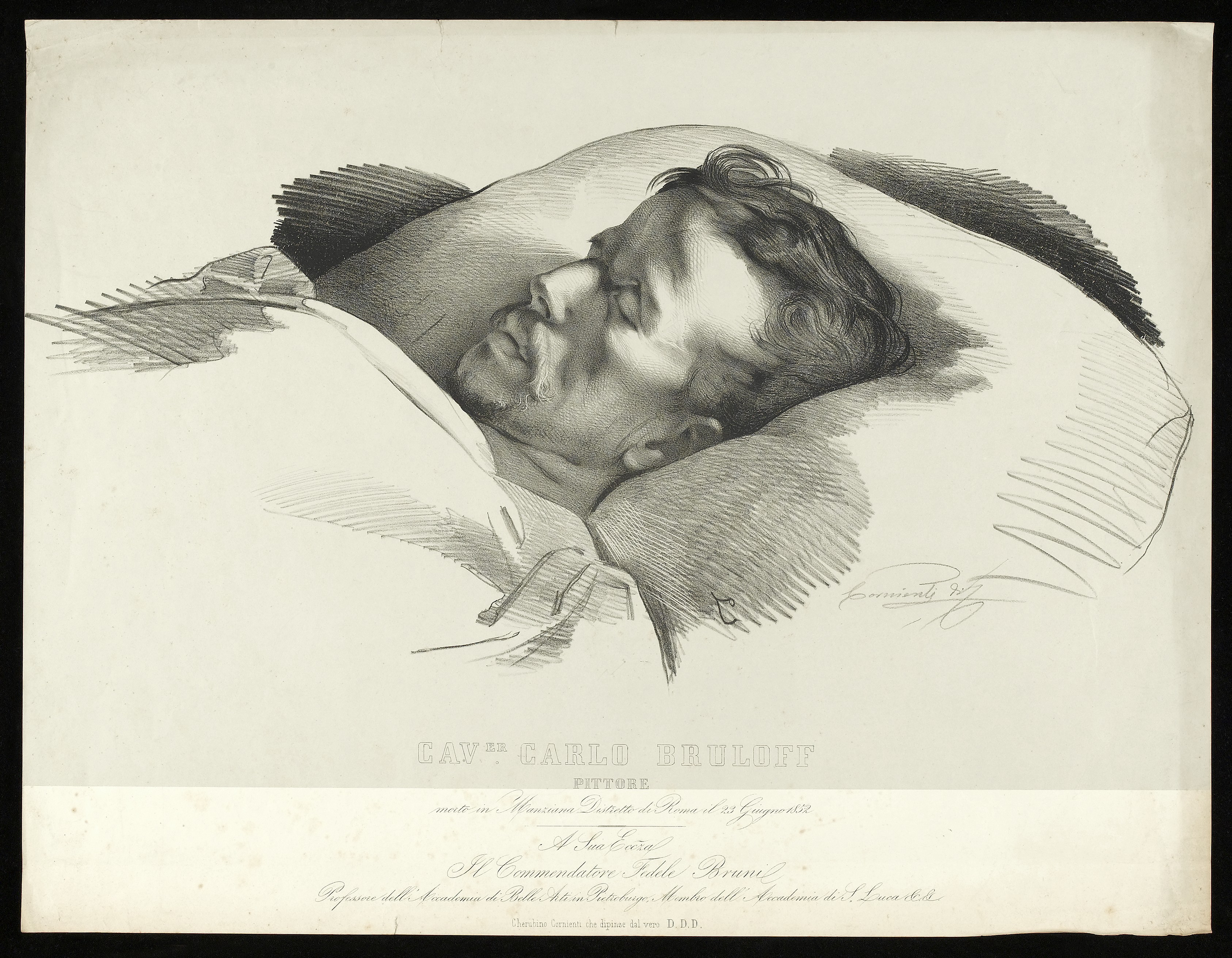
Karl Bryullov on his deathbed (1832)

Son of an artisan Luigi and his wife Paola Marazzi, he was born in Pavia. He followed his brother Giuseppe, an engraver and lithographer at Milan. When he was early 12 years of age, he was admitted to the Brera Academy. In 1835, he participated in the annual exhibition at the Academy, and the next year, along with Domenico Induno, he won a prestigious award. He began a studio, alongside Induno, Giuseppe Mongeri, and Mauro Conconi.

In 1838 he painted the portrait of the patron Felice Borroni of Solcio di Lesa. In 1839, he painted the Bishop of Lodi, Count Gaetano Benaglia. In 1842, he painted the Paolo Erizzo bids Farewell to his Daughters. In 1843, the Brera Academy awarded him a three-year stipend to paint in Rome. There he gravitated to the colony of Italian and foreign artists allied to the Accademia di San Luca, including Karl Bryullov. He attended courses in the French Academy in Villa Medici. In 1850, he was commissioned a fresco on Christ at Emmaus for the Convent of the Cappuccini of Tivoli. In 1853, his painting of Child Moses steps on the Crown of the Pharaoh was sent for exhibition in Milan but the judges including Francesco Hayez, severely criticized the work.

He works in Garlate and Crema. In 1854, his work was interrupted by the demise of his model and companion Lalla, who had accompanied him from Rome to Milan. He visited Venice and Trieste. Back in Milan, he paints the portrait of Renato Borromeo. In 1856 two altarpieces for the church in Malgrate. In 1857, he proposed painting frescoes for the Duomo of Vigevano, but the commission is assigned to Francesco Gonin.

Back in Rome, he continued to paint historical subjects, including events in the life of Leonardo, Michelangelo, Ludovico il Moro, and Galeazzo Sforza. Finally in 1860, the Academy of Fine Arts of Bologna nominated him Professor of Painting with a stipend of 3500 Lire. But within a few months, Cherubino died in Milan at 44 years of age. He was buried alongside his friend Mauro Conconi, who died two days later.

== Works ==
- Portrait of Felice Borroni, 1838
- Portrait of Count Gaetano Benaglia, Bishop of Lodi, 1839
- Farewell of Paolo Erizzo to his daughters, 1842
- I profughi di Praga, 1843
- Self-portrait, 1843 (Gallery of Villa Belgiojoso Bonaparte, Museo dell'Ottocento, Milan)
- Wife of the Levite Ephraim, 1845
- Madonna with Saints Carlo and Alessandro (altarpiece at church of Sant'Alessandro in Zebedia, Milan)
- Michelangelo unveils Moses statue to pope Paul III, 1848
- Child Moses steps on the Pharaoh's Crown, 1853, (Pinacoteca di Brera, Milan)
- Portrait of Carlo Testori, 1853
- Portrait of signora Testori, 1853
- Myth of Prometheus, wall fresco 1855 (villa Testori, Garlate)
- Annunciation, 1856 (church of San Leonardo, Malgrate)
- Nativity Scene 1856 (church of San Leonardo, Malgrate)
- Leonardo da Vinci shows Ludovico il Moro the conch of the Naviglio, 1858
- Venus and putti, 1859 (Galleria d'Arte Moderna, Milan)

== Exhibitions ==
- 1835, 1839 Milan, Exhibition at Accademia di Belle Arti di Brera
- 1842 Venice, Exhibition at Accademia di Belle Arti
- 1842, 1843, 1845, 1846, 1850, 1851, 1853 Exhibition at the Brera
- 1855 Universal Exposition of Arts and Industry, Paris.
- 1856, 1857, 1858, 1859 Milano, Exhibition at Accademia di Belle Arti di Brera
- 1900 Lombard Painting of 19th century, Milan.
- 1929 Milan, Mostra commemorativa di Tranquillo Cremona nel 50º anniversario della morte
- 1934 Rome, II Mostra d'Arte Sacra
- 1960 Pavia, Cherubino Cornienti ed i pittori pavesi dell'800
- 1969 Milan, La Milano del primo Romanticismo
- 1975 Milan, Mostra dei Maestri di Brera
- 1976 Pavia, Pavia. Cent'anni di cultura artistica
- 1983 Costanza, La Battaglia di Legnano
- 1986 Milano, 1886-1986 La Permanente. Un secolo d'arte a Milano
- 1989 Roma, Risorgimento greco e filoellenismo italiano
- 1991 Sartirana, I Mostra Mercato della pittura dell'800
- 1992 Milano, Il primo Ottocento italiano
- 1993 Milano, Milano e la Lombardia in età comunale
- 1996 Pavia, Cherubino Cornienti pittore (1816-1860)

== Bibliography ==
- C.Carrà, La pittura romantica in Lombardia, ne "L'Ambrosiano", Milano, October 15, 1930.
- U.Ojetti (a cura di) Tranquillo Cremona and Lombard artists of his Time, catalogo della mostra, Castello di Pavia, Milan 1938.
- G.Ballo (curator) La Milano del primo Romanticismo, catalogo della mostra, Milano 1969.
- Catalogo asta Finarte n.537 del 18 marzo 1986, Milano 1986.
- I.Marelli, Cherubino Cornienti, La pittura in Italia. l'Ottocento, II, Milano 1991.
- F.Mazzocca, Cherubino Cornienti, in Musei e Gallerie di Milano, Pinacoteca di Brera, Milano 1993.
- Cherubino Cornienti pittore (1816,1860), exhibition at Castello Visconteo of Pavia, 1996, Diakronia.
