= Zuccoli =

Zuccoli may refer to:

- Zuccoli, Northern Territory, a relatively new suburb in the City of Palmerston, Northern Territory, Australia, located to the south-west of Palmerston City. Its postal
- Giorgio Zuccoli, Italian former yacht racer who competed in the 1988 Summer Olympics and in the 1992 Summer Olympics
- Luigi Zuccoli, Italian painter
