= Portrait of Matilde Juva Branca =

1851 painting by Francesco Hayez

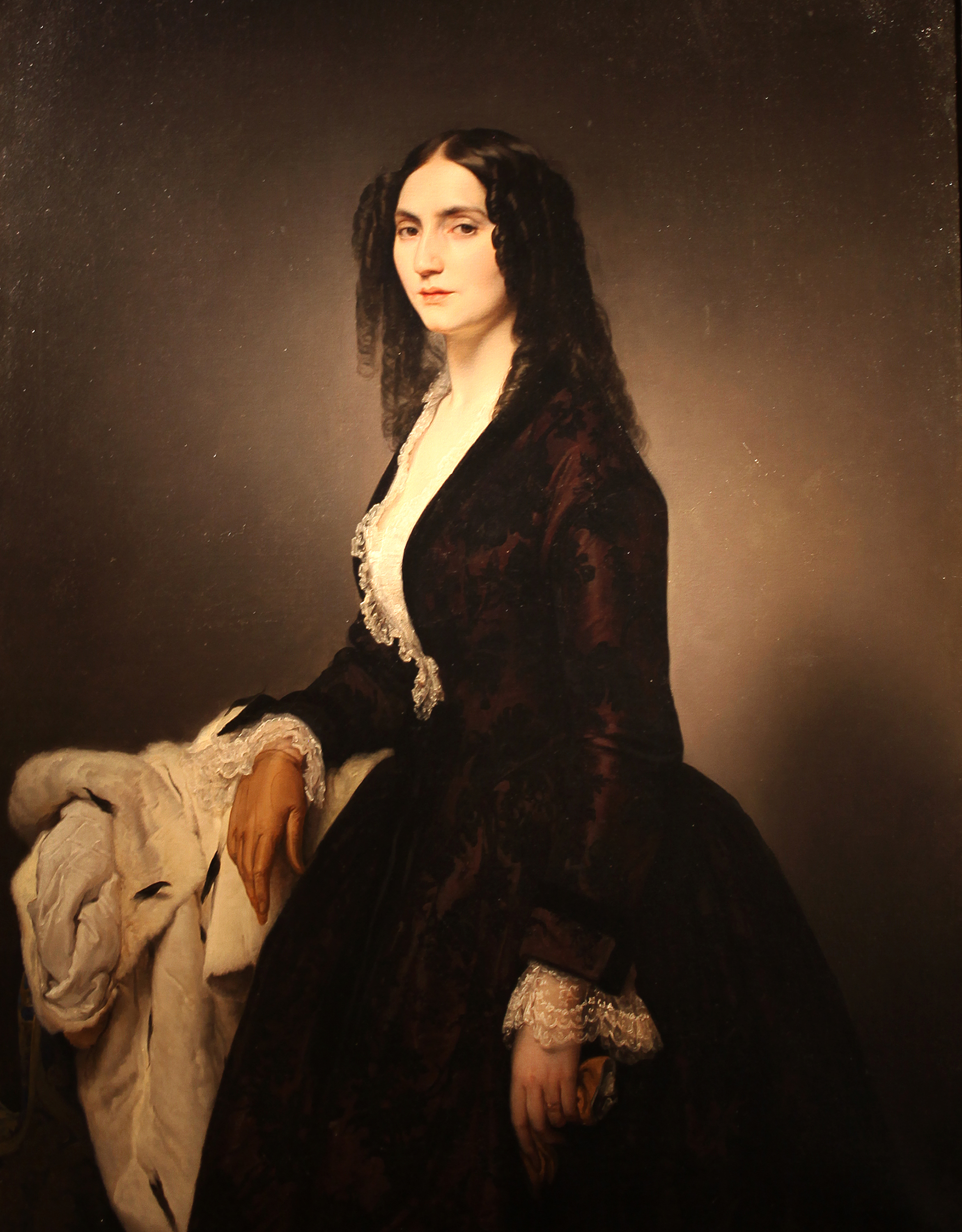
Portrait of Matilde Juva Branca (1851) by Francesco Hayez

Portrait of Matilde Juva Branca is an 1851 oil-on-canvas painting by the Italian artist Francesco Hayez, now in the Galleria d'Arte Moderna in Milan, to which it was given in 1893 by Carlo Weber.

The austere gaze belongs to Matilde Branca (Juva by marriage). An opera singer, she shared her musical talents with her sisters, Luigia (a mezzo-soprano), Emilia (a harpist), and Cirilla (a pianist). She was also a prominent personality in the salon of her father, Paolo Branca, which was once dubbed "The Temple of Music" by the famed opera composer Gaetano Donizetti.

The piece was commissioned by her husband Giovanni as a companion piece to his own portrait, also painted in 1851 by Mauro Conconi. The canvas is considered a masterpiece of 19th-century portraiture, thanks to the accuracy of its psychological introspection and its formal resolution, which aimed to recapture the traditions of 16th-century Venetian portraiture.

The arrangement of the figure at a three-quarter angle, her arm resting on a chair covered with an ermine mantle spread, creates a series of planes that expand the sense of space in the painting. At the center of the canvas, the figure of the woman, wrapped in luxurious black-silk robes, contrasts with the lace that frames her hands and face. In addition, the hand that holds the glove reveals an homage to Tiziano, making explicit reference to L'uomo col guanto (The Man with the Glove) and L'uomo dagli occhi glauchi (The Man with the Glaucous Eyes).
