= Monument to Felice Cavallotti, Milan =

Sculpture in Milan

Coordinates: 45.47053°N 9.19772°E

Monument to Felice Cavallotti
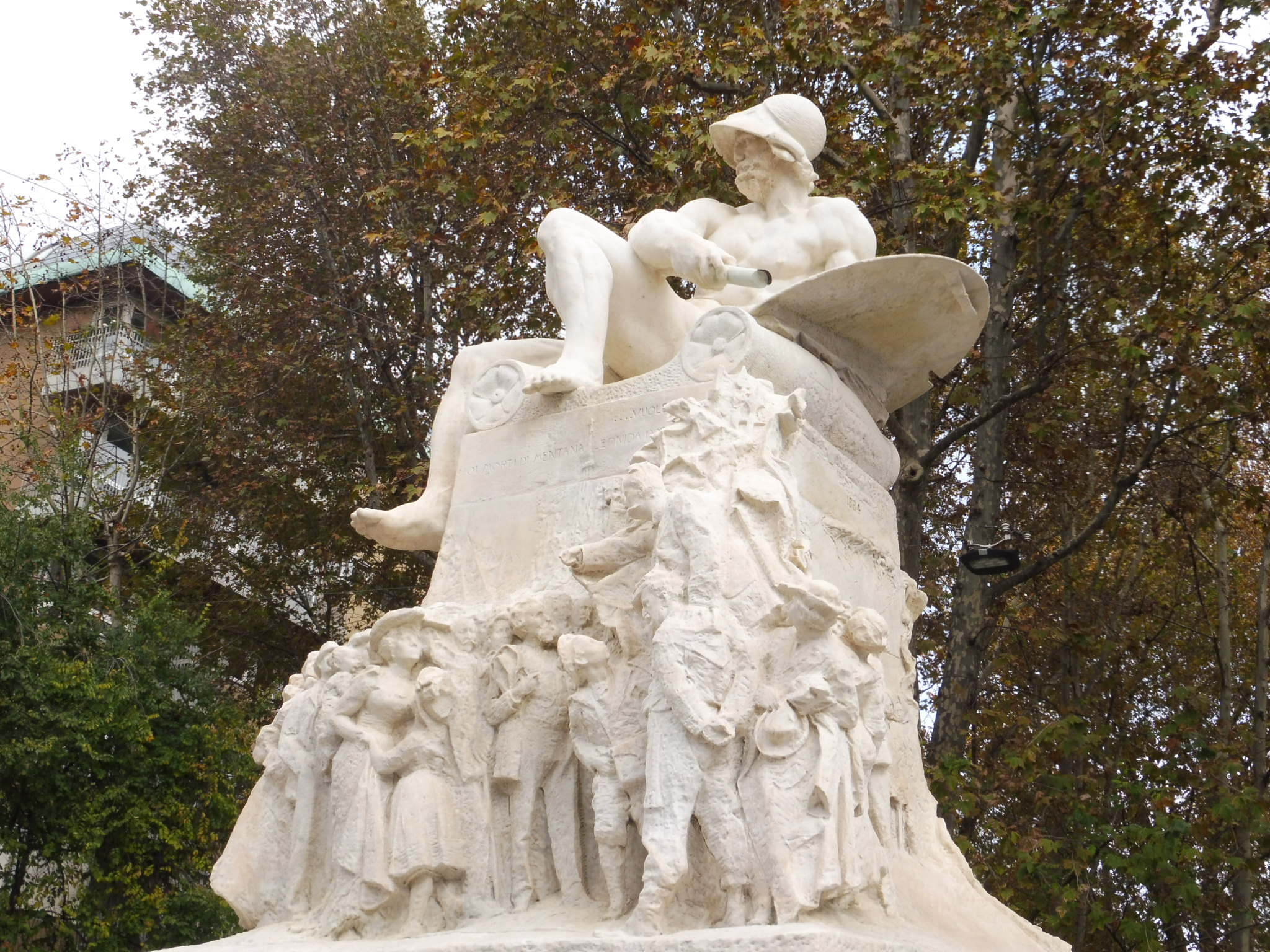
- Monument and plinth
- Interactive map of Monument to Felice Cavallotti
- Location: Palazzo del Senato, Milan, Italy
- Designer: Ernesto Bazzaro
- Type: Sculpture and plinth
- Material: Marble
- Completion date: 1906
- Dedicated to: Felice Cavallotti

The Monument to the Felice Cavallotti is a marble sculpture on a plinth located Via Marina #2 in Milan, Italy. It is located just north of the facade of the Palazzo del Senato in Milan, in a pocket park that emerges south of the gardens of the Villa Belgiojoso Bonaparte. The monument was created by Italian sculptor Ernesto Bazzaro and is dedicated to tempestuous patriot, politician, journalist, and poet, Felice Cavallotti.

The statue celebrates Cavallotti with idiosyncratic iconography, and its placement also has migrated across the city since its initial inauguration in 1905. The monument was commissioned three years after his death by duel in 1898 by a committee led by Giuseppe Missori, a former fellow-follower of Garibaldi. Atop the plinth is a naked recumbent statue between two sculpted pillows depicting Leonidas, the King of Spartans, and subject of one of Cavallotti's poems. Leondias lays partly on his shield, the long spear once leaning over the side of the sculpture has broken and has not been repaired. He gazes towards the distance. In the plinth below is a raised relief, with rough unfinished sections, depicting with three scenes from the life of Cavallotti, unfolding from the right front clockwise to the back of the statue, depicting Cavallotti haranguing the masses; Cavallotti tending to the children with cholera in Naples; and in the back, crowd attending Cavallotti's funeral.

The statue was initially placed in 1906 in Piazza della Rosa, later renamed piazza Pio XI, in front of the Biblioteca Ambrosiana, but putatively this displeased the monks associated with the library. It was moved in 1933 elsewhere, and then in 1943 moved to this spot to replace the statue of another Garibaldini patriot, Giacomo Medici, which had been destroyed by Allied bombardments of World War II.
