= Mauro Conconi =

Italian painter (1815–1860)

Mauro Conconi (December 1815 – 14 May 1860) was an Italian painter.

== Biography ==
He was born and died in Milan. He was trained in the Brera Academy. The painter Carlo Bellosio invited him to paint in the Castle of Pollenzo in 1837, and to the Castle of Racconigi and Turin in 1842 to help in the decorations made at Royal sites. Here, Conconi worked with Palagi. He painted canvases depicting San Vincenzo de Paoli, Parisina, Cristoforo Colombo (Columbus), Byron, a depiction of The Prisoner of Chillon from Byron's poem, Galileo Galilei, Camoens, The Surprised Bather, and the Ultimate Riches. He painted the fresco medallion on the ceiling at the entry of the Armoury in the Royal Palace of Turin. He also painted for the Villa or Palazzo Calderara, Vanzago, and frescoed also in the church of Origgio. There are works by him also in Vigevano, Lodi, Malnate, Galliano, and Barzanò. He was buried alongside his close friend and colleague, Cherubino Cornienti, who died two days before him.
