= Portrait of Countess Antonietta Negroni Prati Morosini as a Child =

1858 painting by Francesco Hayez

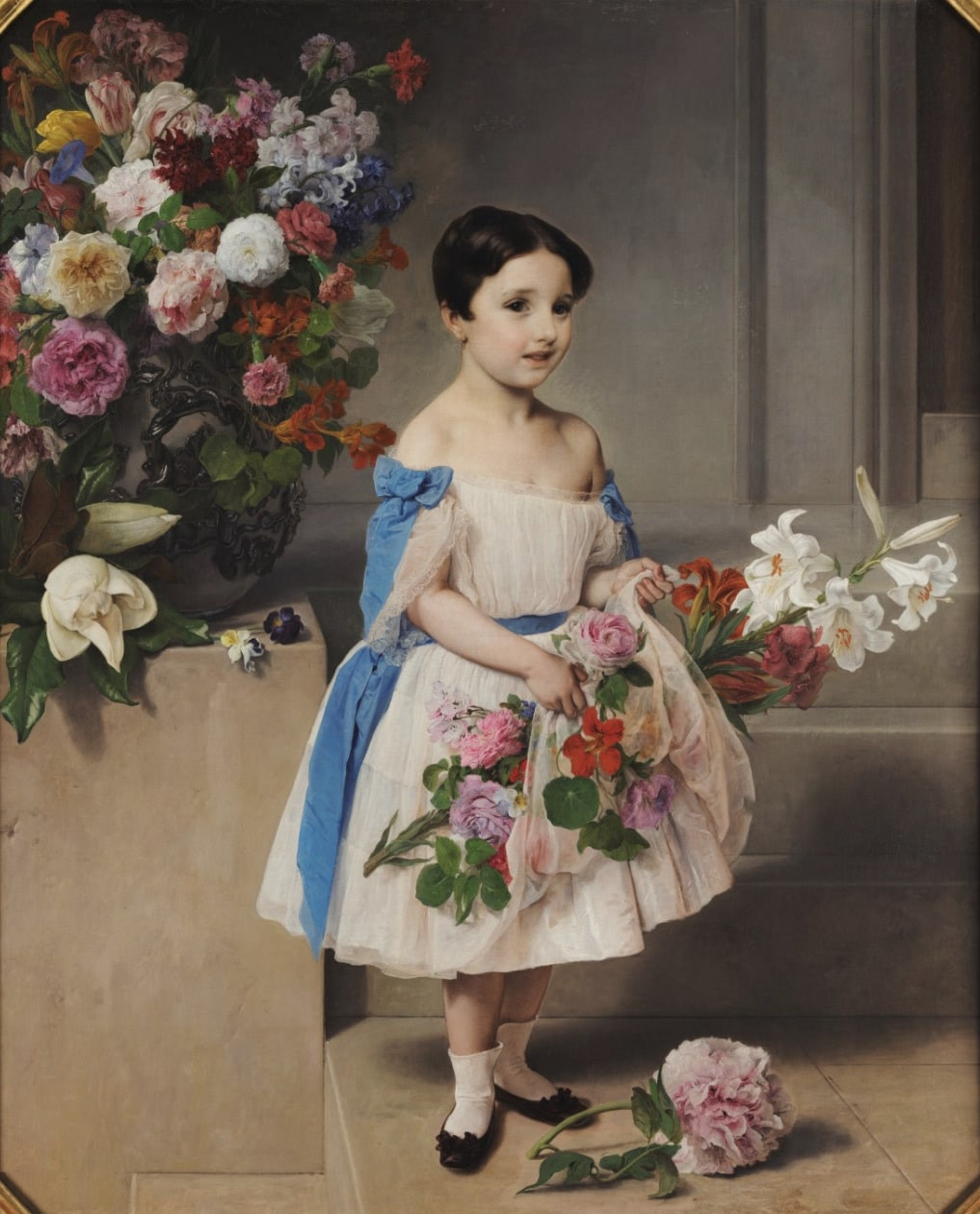
- Artist: Francesco Hayez
- Year: 1858
- Medium: oil on canvas
- Dimensions: 133.5 cm × 110 cm (52.6 in × 43 in)
- Location: Galleria d'Arte Moderna; Milan

Portrait of Countess Antonietta Negroni Prati Morosini as a Child is an 1858 oil-on-canvas portrait by the Italian artist Francesco Hayez, commissioned by the subject's father Alessandro Negroni Prati Morosini. It is now in the Galleria d'Arte Moderna, in Milan, to which it was given in 1935 by Anna Cristina del Mayno Casati.

== Description ==
Hayez decided to use some photographs of the countess for this portrait, to avoid long poses. Despite the reassuring closeness of the little girl's mother in the photos used by the artist, the expression of the little countess revealed a sense of discomfort and bewilderment that Hayez decided to preserve in his portrait. Thus he gave to the painting an unconventional realistic freshness compared with the conventional canons of his time for child portraiture. The child is holding several flowers and one of them lies in the floor. Behind her there is a vase with a large amount of flowers, which was not very appreciated by the critics back then.

== Cultural references ==
The painting was the subject of a 300 lire Poste Italiane stamp in 1982 as part of a series on Italian art.
