= Ernesto Bazzaro =

Italian sculptor (1859–1937)

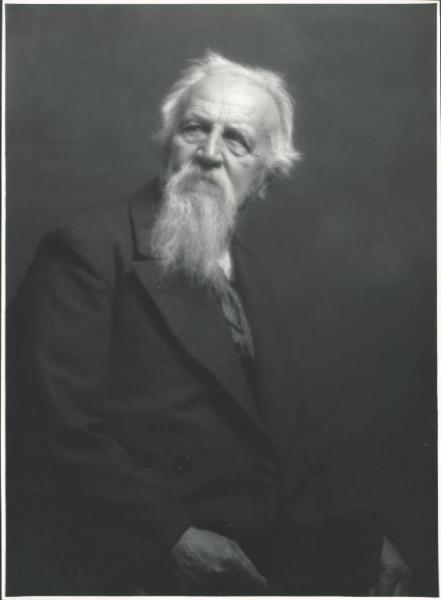
Ernesto Bazzaro

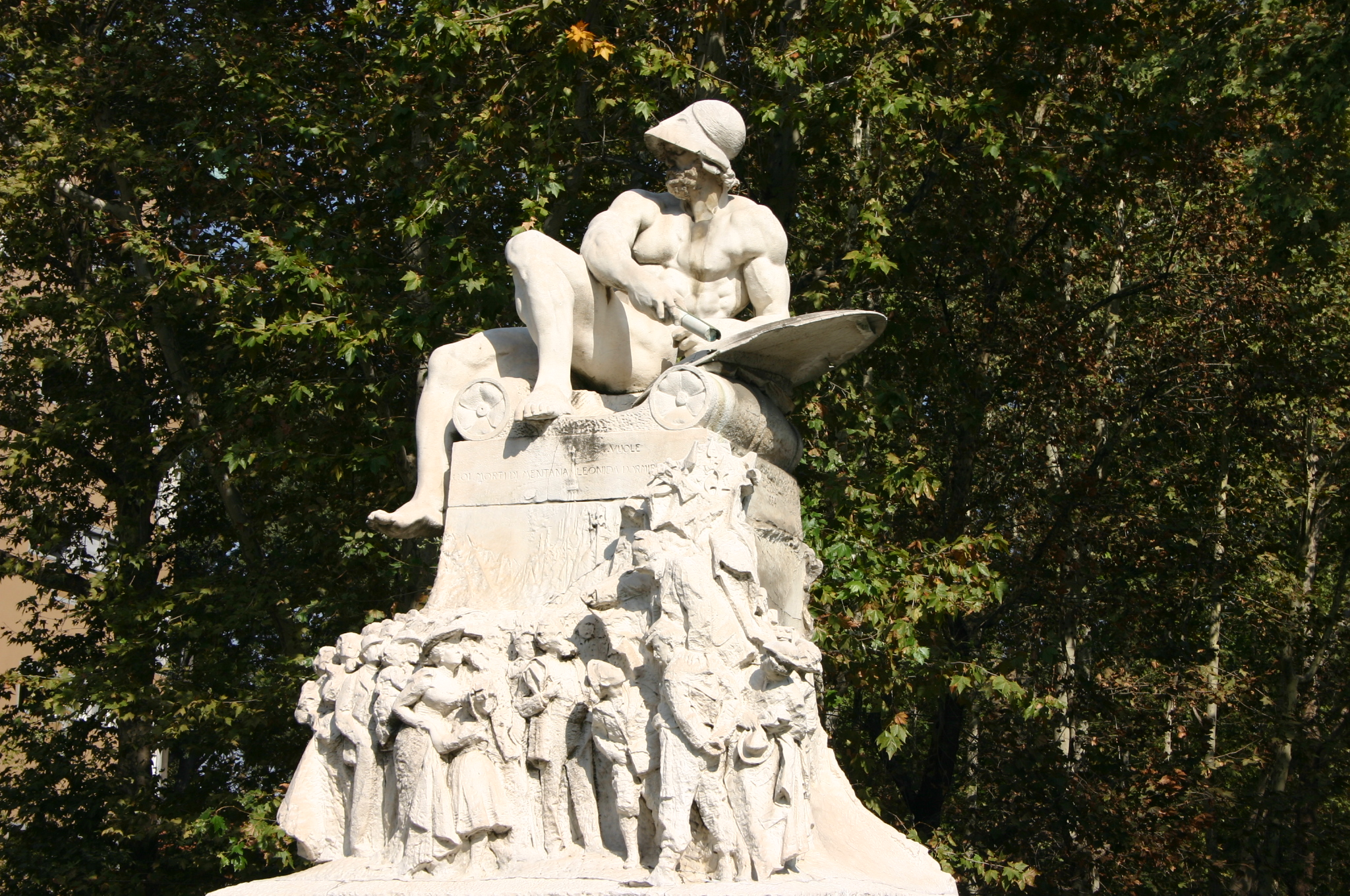
Monument to Felice Cavallotti, Milan

Ernesto Bazzaro (/ernˈɛsto bat͡sːˈaro/) (29 May 1859 – 18 May 1937) was an Italian sculptor.

== Biography ==
Like his elder brother, Leonardo, Ernesto Bazzaro studied at the Brera Academy in Milan, which he attended from 1875, winning the Luigi Canonica Prize in 1881. As a participant in the lively scene of the Scapigliatura movement, he was an attentive observer of the renewal in the plastic arts led by Giuseppe Grandi. He made a name for himself in genre sculpture as well as monumental and cemetery sculpture, obtaining important commissions including the monument to Giuseppe Garibaldi in Monza in 1886 and, twenty years later, the monument to Felice Cavallotti in Milan. His works received acclaim in exhibitions in Italy and abroad, and he won the Principe Umberto Prize in 1888 with his plaster group The Widow, which, after being executed in marble, won awards at the international exhibitions of 1889 in Paris, 1892 in Munich and the national exhibition of 1892 in Palermo, where it was purchased by the Ministry of Education. From 1905 to 1908, he sat on the Milan City Council in the ranks of the Unione Partiti Popolari which comprised socialists, radicals, and republicans. An exhibition was devoted to Bazzaro and his brother at the Galleria Centrale d’Arte in Milan in 1917, and, three years after his death, a retrospective was held at the Società per le Belle Arti ed Esposizione Permanente.

== Other projects ==
Media related to Ernesto Bazzaro at Wikimedia Commons
