= San Sepolcro, Milan =

Church in Milan, Italy

Coordinates: 45°27′47″N 9°11′07″E

Church of San Sepolcro (Chiesa di San Sepolcro)
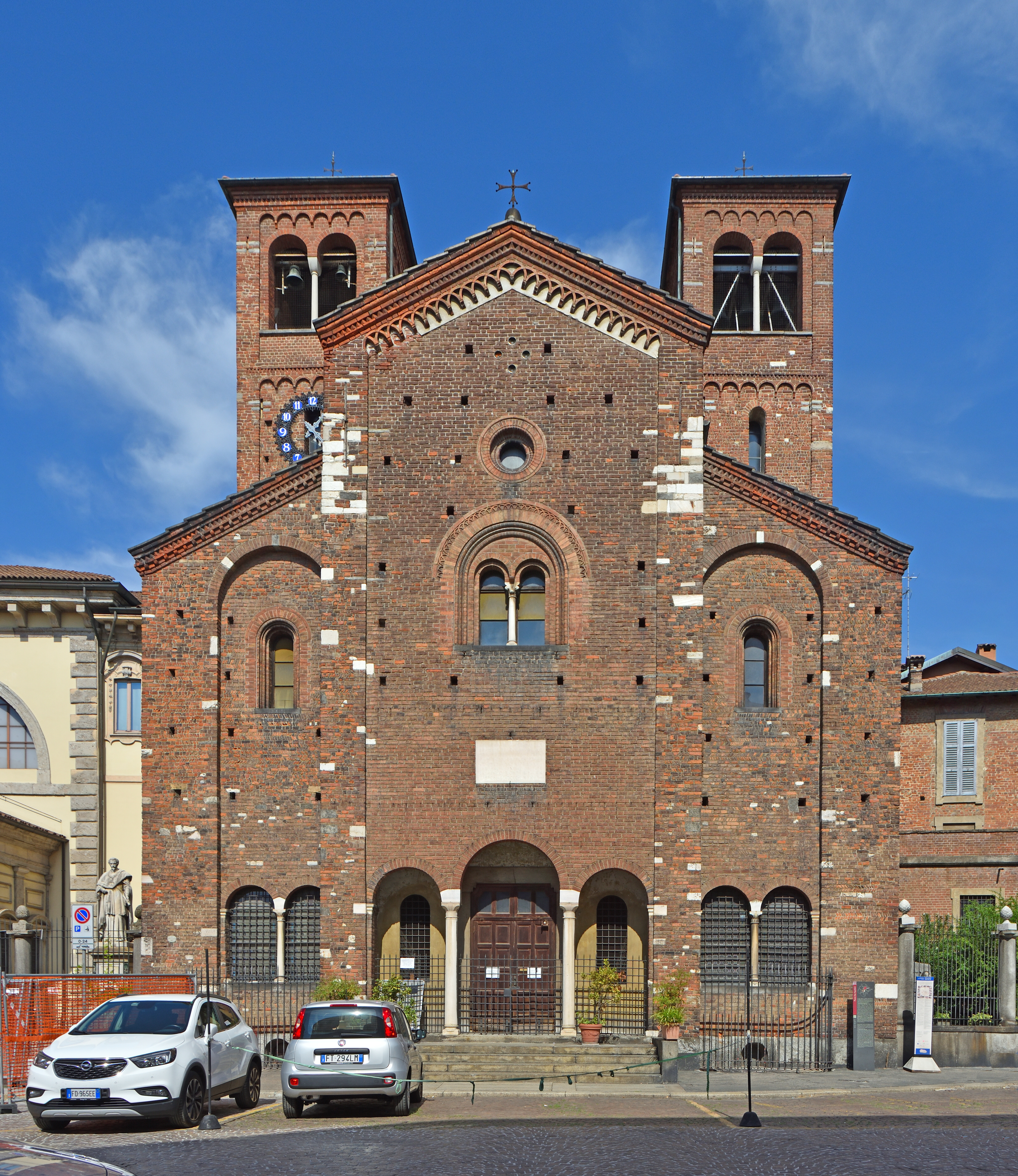
- Façade of the church

Religion
- Affiliation: Catholic
- Province: Milan
- Status: Active

Location
- Location: Milan, Italy
- Interactive map of Church of San Sepolcro (Chiesa di San Sepolcro)

Architecture
- Type: Church
- Style: Romanesque
- Groundbreaking: 1030
- Completed: 1897

Chiesa di San Sepolcro is a church in Milan, Italy. It was originally built in 1030, but has undergone multiple revisions. The church is located at Piazza San Sepolcro in the historic center of Milan.

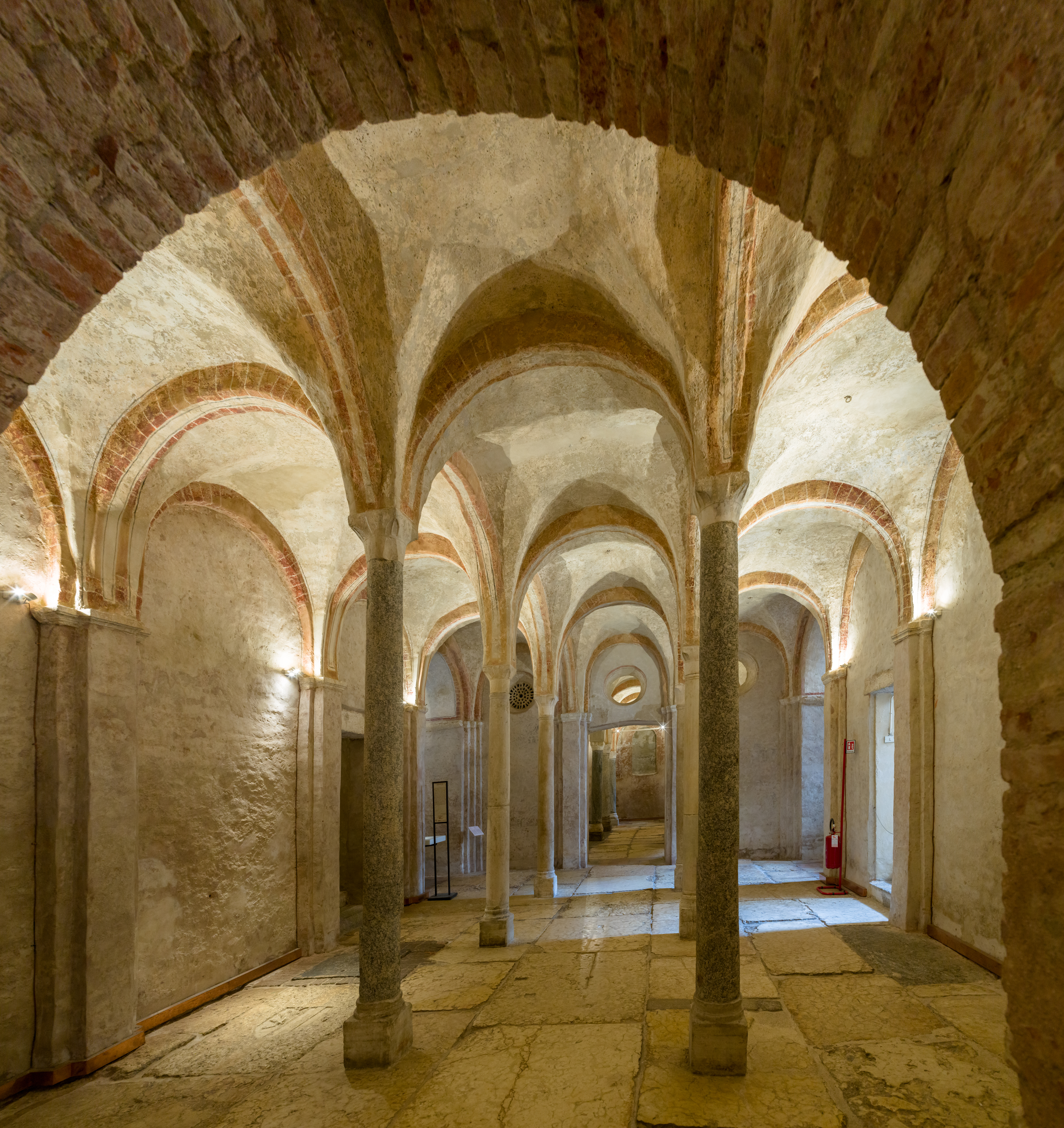
The crypt of the church.

The latest interior restoration was in 1713–1719, while the present Neo-Romanesque facade was completed in 1894–1897, under the designs of Gaetano Moretti and Cesare Nava. The Bramantino frescoes were moved from the portal to the inside of the church. Other works inside are attributed to Francesco Maria Richini and Carlo Bellosio.
