= Carlo Bellosio =

Italian painter (1801–1849)

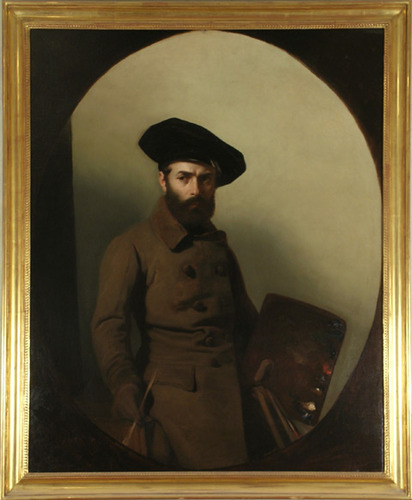
Portrait by Mauro Conconi, 1840s

Carlo Bellosio (1801–1849) was an Italian painter, active mainly in Lombardy in the Neoclassical style.

== Biography ==
He was born in Milan, where he trained as a pupil of Pelagio Palagi.

He painted for the church of San Ambrogio in Voltri (in Genoa); for the chapel of the church of San Sepolcro in Milan; for the church of Santa Maria Segreta in Milan; an Assumption of Mary; and for the temple of San Protasio, he painted a Baptism by John (both church and painting destroyed). He also painted for San Barnaba and Santa Maria Podone. He also worked in Trezzo d'Adda, Vertova, Val Seriana, and for the Sanctuary of San Prospero in Cressa in Novara.

He frescoed bacchantes and Maenads with an Aurora in the grand room of the casa Poreti in Milan; also decorative frescoes for the casa Scotti in Ponte San Pietro, for the casa Casati in Como, for the casa dei Conti Leonardi in Novara, in a Medolago in casa dei conti Medolago in Medolago, for the casa dei conti Borromeo in Viggiù; and Pallanza (now part of Verbania as well as Pavia,

For an Englishman from Devonshire, England, he painted a canvas copy, life size, of The Last Supper of Leonardo.

In 1834, he painted his masterwork, an Episode of the Flood for the Royal Villa of Racconigi. Here he collaborated with his master Palagi and his contemporary Vitale Sala to complete a cycle of frescoes and oil paintings on various decorative and mythologic themes. Francesco Gonin also collaborated in the decoration of some of the rooms. He was also commissioned to fresco the Royal Villa of Pollenzo; and later for the Royal Palace in Turin, where he frescoed the Institution of the order of the Santissima Annunziata in the chapel of the Royal Castle.

He returned to Bellagio, where in 1841 he painted another Scene of the Universal Flood, a rich composition with many figures and episodes; after this, again for the Royal Palace of Turin, he painted a fresco of Penelope proposes the archery challenge to the suitors

In 1845, he traveled to Russia to visit the site of the Napoleonic Battle of Berezina. He planned to paint a large composition of this event (Il passaggio della Beresina) which occurred during the retreat of Napoleon, and where many Italian soldiers lost their life. While he worked intensely on the 14 by 6 meter canvas for months, he died before it was finished.

== Sources ==
- This article was translated from the corresponding article on the Italian Wikipedia.
- Carlo Bellosio Entry, by Franca Dalmasso in Dizionario Biografico degli Italiani - Volume 7 (1970).
