= Vitale Sala =

Italian painter (1803–1835)

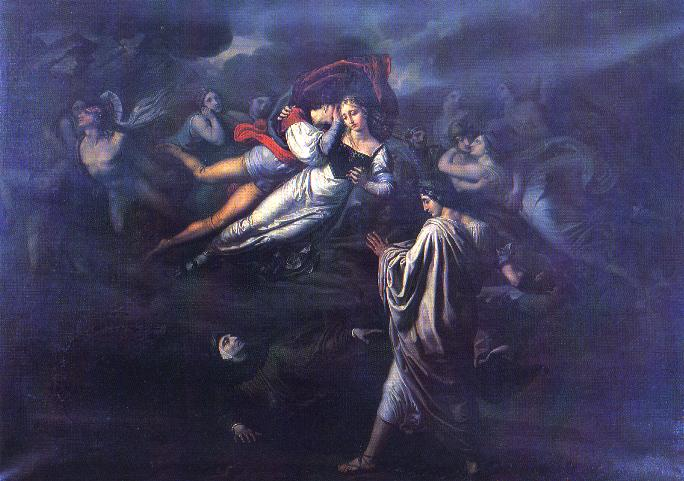
Dante meets Paolo and Francesca, 1823

Vitale Sala (April 17, 1803 – July 22, 1835) was an Italian painter.

He was born in Cernusco Lombardone, and died young in Milan. He was a pupil, along with Carlo Bellosio, of Pelagio Palagi. He died while assisting his master in the decoration of the royal palaces of the House of Savoy, including the Palazzina di caccia of Stupinigi and the Castle of Racconigi.
