= Villa Belgiojoso Bonaparte =

Villa in Milan, Italy

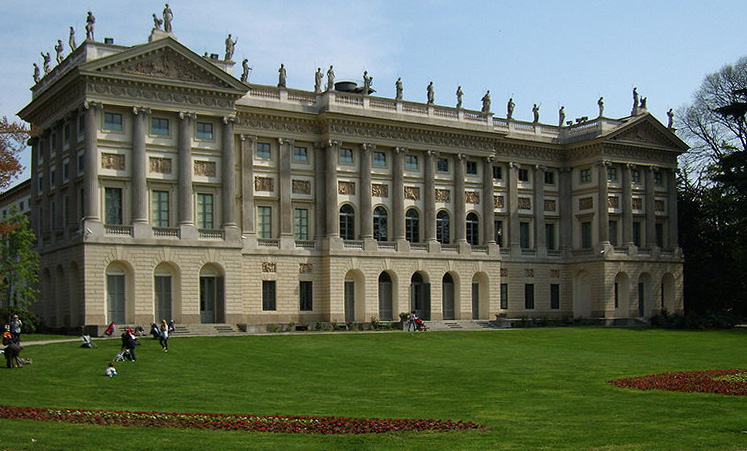
- The Royal Villa of Milan

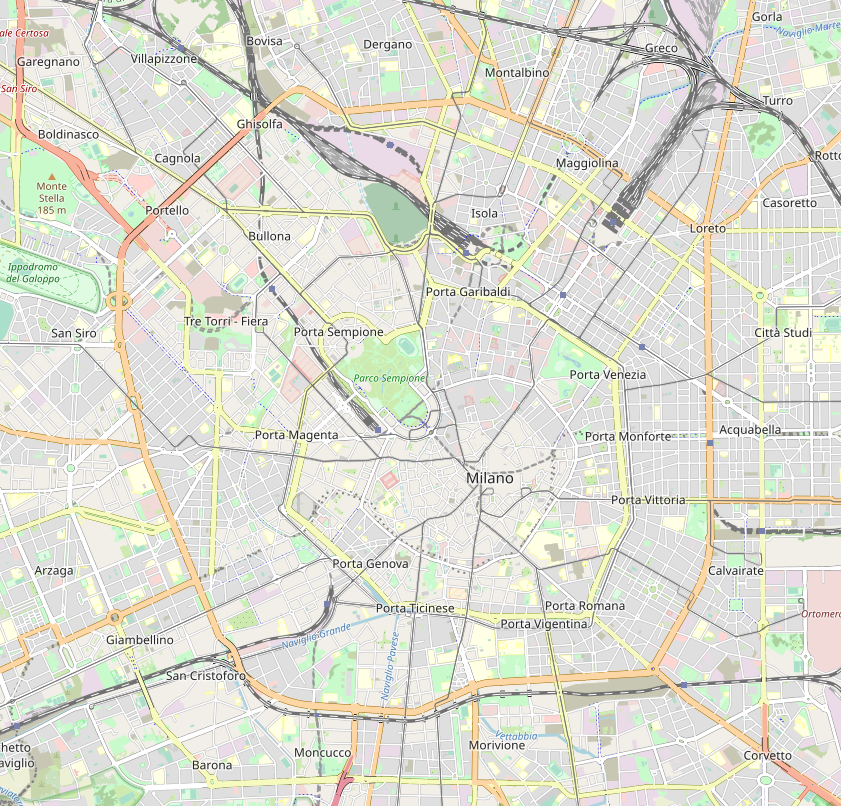
- Location within Milan Location within Italy

General information
- Architectural style: Neoclassical style
- Location: Milan, Italy
- Coordinates: 45°28′21″N 9°11′59″E

Design and construction
- Architect: Giardini Pubblici

The Villa Belgiojoso Bonaparte, also known as Villa Reale and formerly called Villa Comunale, is a palace in Milan, in Lombardy in northern Italy. It was built between 1790 and 1796 as the residence of Count Ludovico Barbiano di Belgiojoso. The villa is in Neoclassical style, and was designed by Leopoldo Pollack. The main entrance is on via Palestro, facing the Giardini Pubblici of Porta Venezia, the eastern gate of the city.

During the Kingdom of Italy it became the residence of Viceroy Eugène de Beauharnais and his family.

In 1920 the villa came under the ownership of the Comune of Milan; in 1921 it became the home of the Galleria d'Arte Moderna.

Beside the villa is the Padiglione d'Arte Contemporanea, an exhibition space for contemporary art, which was built in 1955 on the site of the former stables of the palace, destroyed by wartime bombing.

The gardens of the villa, in English style with an artificial lake, were laid out by Leopoldo Pollack.

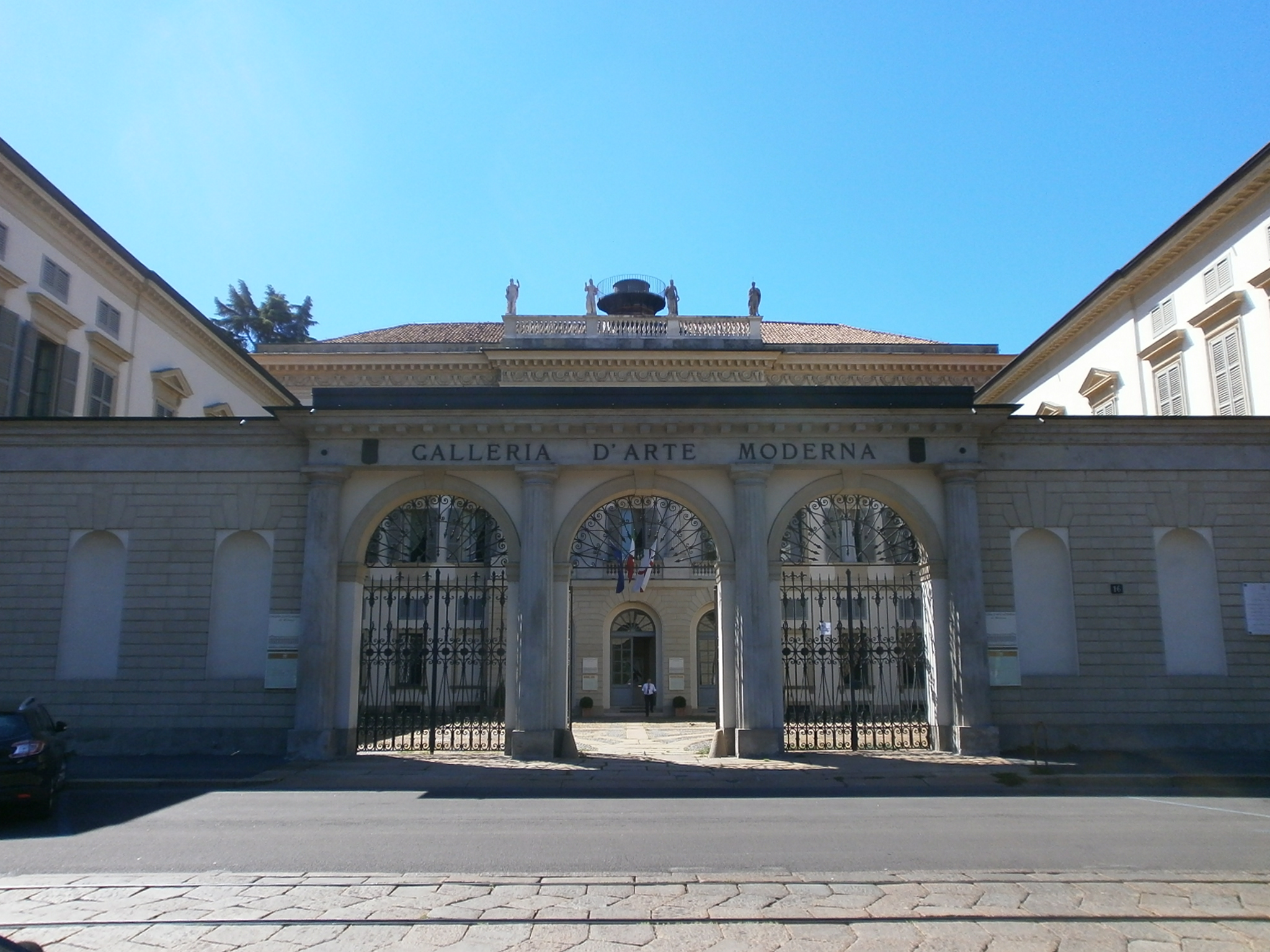
Entrance of the Modern Art Gallery on via Palestro

== See also ==
- Monument to Felice Cavallotti, Milan
