= Luigi Zuccoli =

Italian painter (1815–1876)

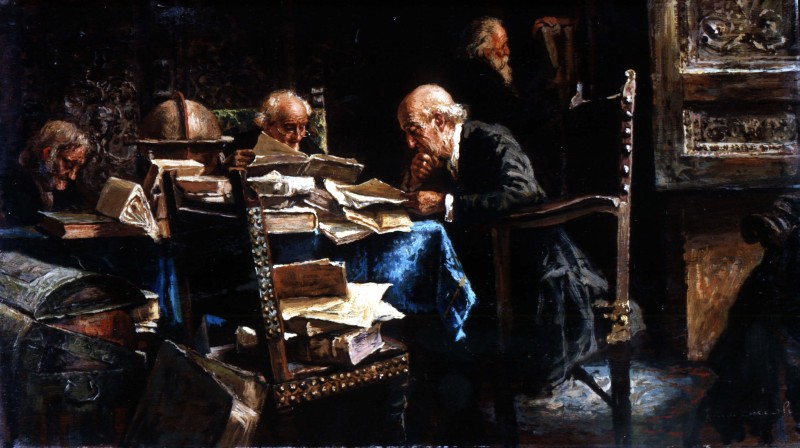
Gli Studiosi

Luigi Zuccoli (1815 – January 5, 1876) was an Italian painter.

He was a native of Milan, and a member of the Academy there. He had frequented the school of Pelagio Palagi, although his style became different In 1855, Zuccoli sent the painting "The First Christian Martyrs" to the exhibition of the Imperial Academy of Arts and was highly appreciated by the critic Vasily Botkin in terms of strength, light and color. Botkin accused Zuccoli of being too theatrical, but here there was the subjectivity of a critic who was carried away by the ideas of political reaction - he recognized the absolute perfection of only Russian art. His works, which were chiefly genre scenes or scenes from Italian domestic life, won considerable popularity beyond his native country. He traveled to England in 1860, and lived there for five years: he painted an episode in the Revolution of 1848 at Milan to the 1862 Exhibition, and also occasionally exhibited at the Royal Academy between 1864 and 1871. He also travelled in Belgium. He died in Milan, after a short illness, on January 5, 1876.
