= Galleria d'Arte Moderna, Milan =

Modern art museum in Milan, Lombardy, Italy

Galleria d'Arte Moderna di Milano
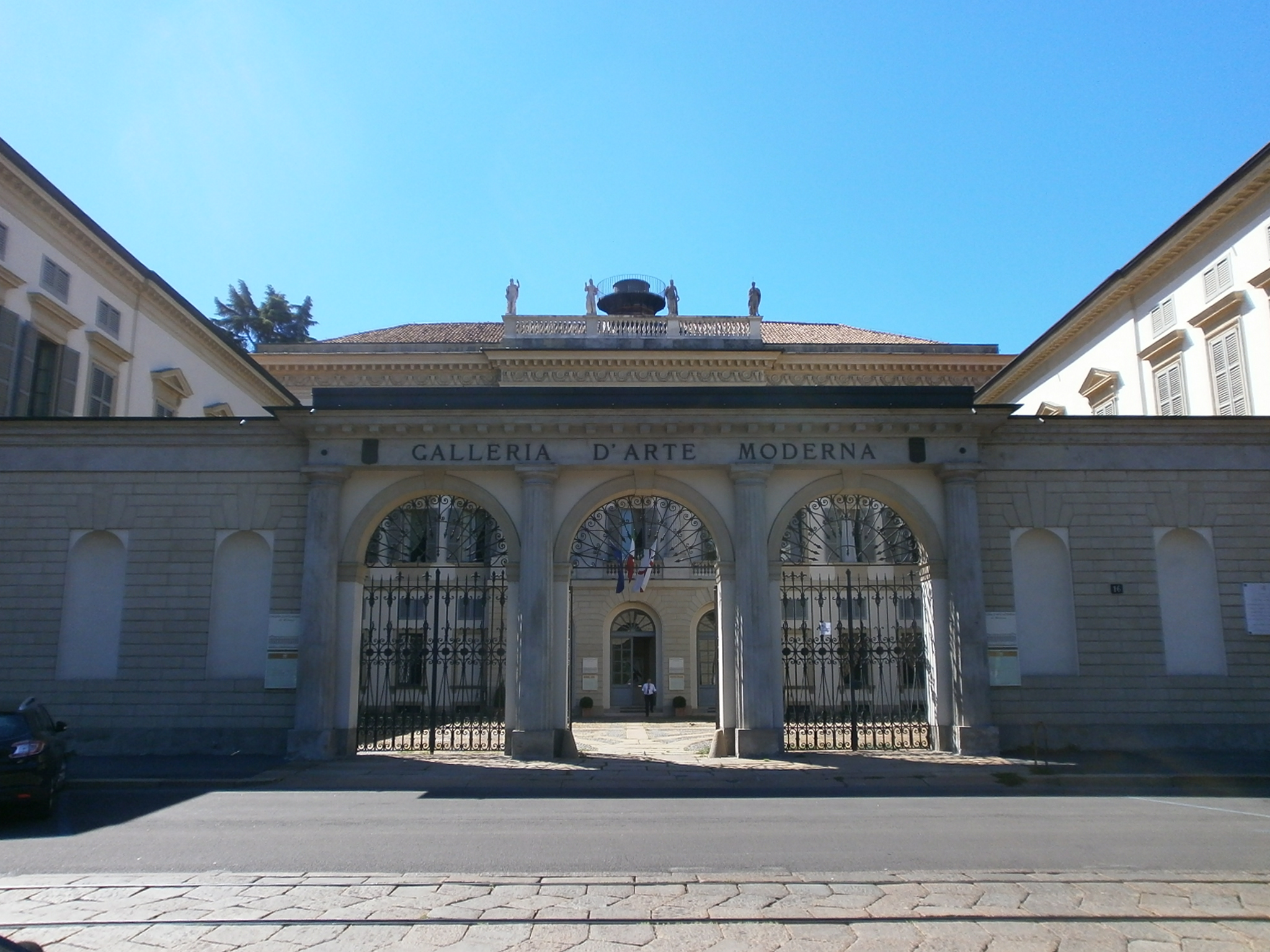
- The entrance in Via Palestro
- Established: 1921
- Location: Via Palestro 16 - 20121 Milan, Italy
- Coordinates: 45°28′21″N 9°11′59″E
- Director: Marina Pugliese
- Curator: Paola Zatti
- Website: www.gam-milano.com

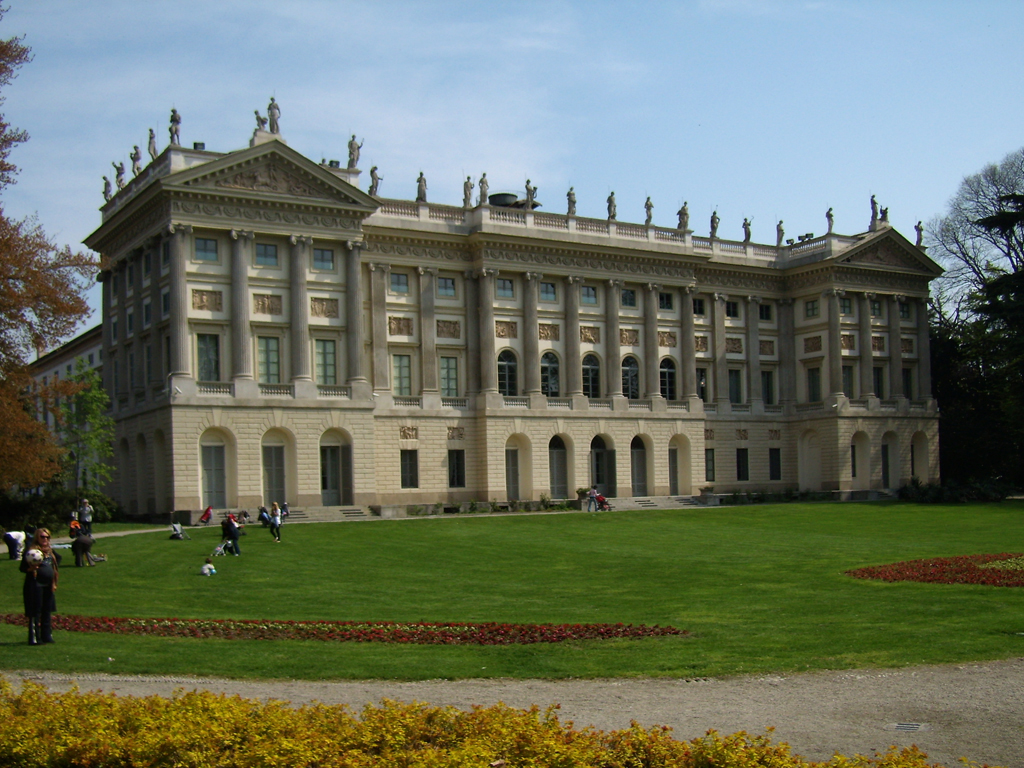
The façade of the Villa Reale

The Galleria d'Arte Moderna is a modern art museum in Milan, in Lombardy in northern Italy. It is housed in the Villa Reale, at Via Palestro 16, opposite the Giardini Pubblici Indro Montanelli. The collection consists largely of Italian and European works from the eighteenth to the twentieth centuries.

The museum has works by Francesco Filippini, Giuseppe Ferrari, Giovanni Fattori, Silvestro Lega, Giovanni Boldini, Vincent van Gogh, Édouard Manet, Paul Gauguin, Paul Cézanne, Pablo Picasso, Giacomo Balla, Umberto Boccioni, Francesco Hayez, Giovanni Segantini, Giuseppe Pellizza da Volpedo and Antonio Canova, among others. Works have been donated by Milanese families including the Treves, Ponti, Grassi and Vismara.

After the Second World War the twentieth-century works in the collection were moved to the Padiglione d'Arte Contemporanea, built in 1955 on the site of the former stables of the palace, which had been destroyed by wartime bombing.

In 2011, some works were moved to the Museo del Novecento.

The museum holds some temporary exhibitions; in 2008 works by Tino Sehgal were presented.

== Principal works ==
The principal works in the collection include:

- Francesco Hayez: Portrait of Alessandro Manzoni, 1841; Penitent Mary Magdalene, 1833; Portrait of Countess Antonietta Negroni Prati Morosini as a Child, 1858; Portrait of Matilde Juva Branca, 1851
- Giovanni Segantini: Le due madri, 1889; L'angelo della vita, 1894
- Umberto Boccioni: La madre, 1907
- Giacomo Balla: Espansione per velocità (Velocità d'automobile), 1913-14: Morbidezze di primavera, 1918
- Giuseppe De Nittis: Colazione a Posillipo, 1878: La femme aux pompons, 1879
- Pablo Picasso: Tête de femme (La Mediterranée), 1957
- Paul Gauguin: Vaches à l'abreuvoir, 1885; Donne di Tahiti, 1891
- Vincent van Gogh: Breton Women and Children, 1888
- Édouard Manet: Portrait of M. Arnaud, 1875
- Paul Cézanne: Les voleurs et l'âne, 1869

== Gallery ==
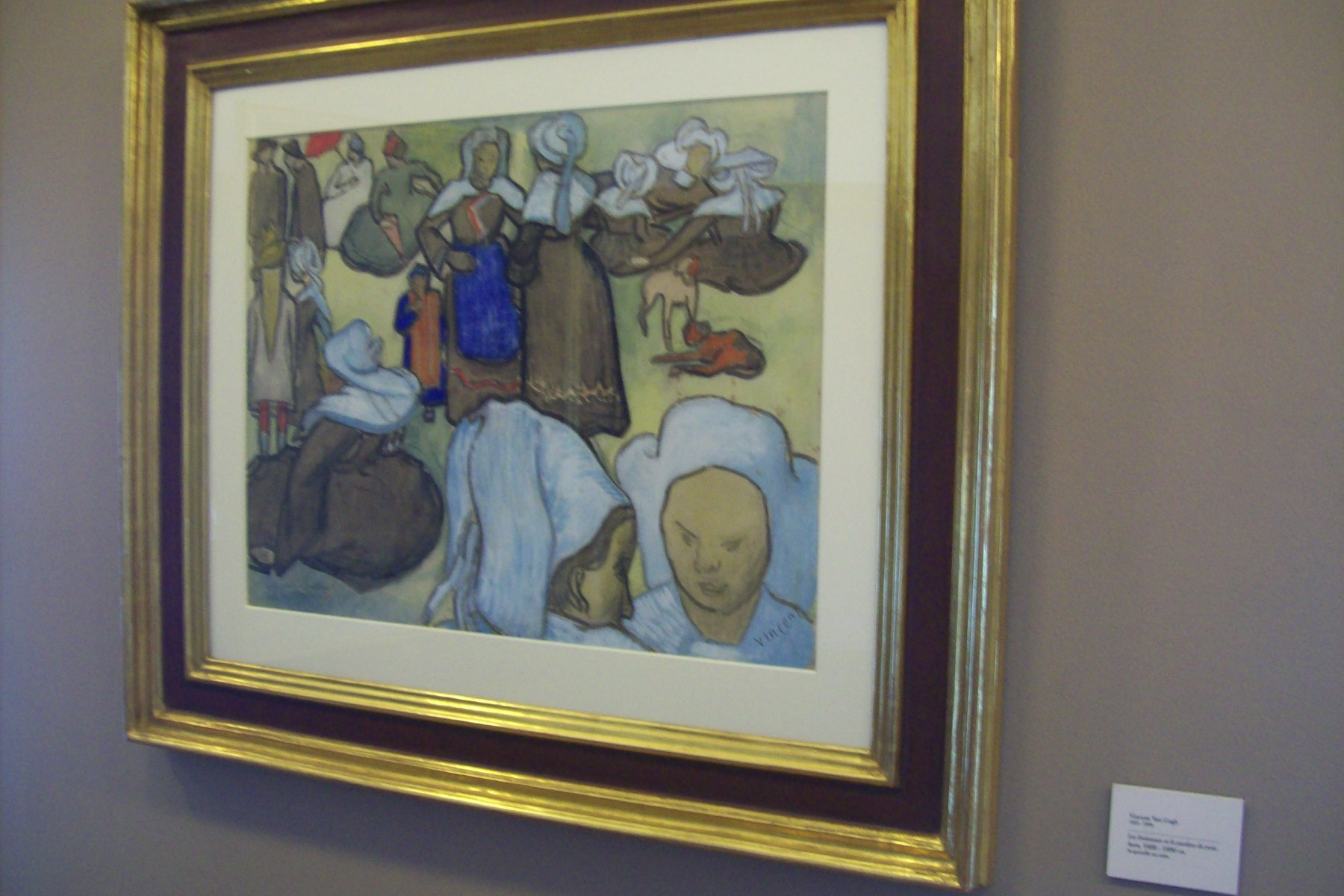
Van Gogh, Breton Women and Children, 1888

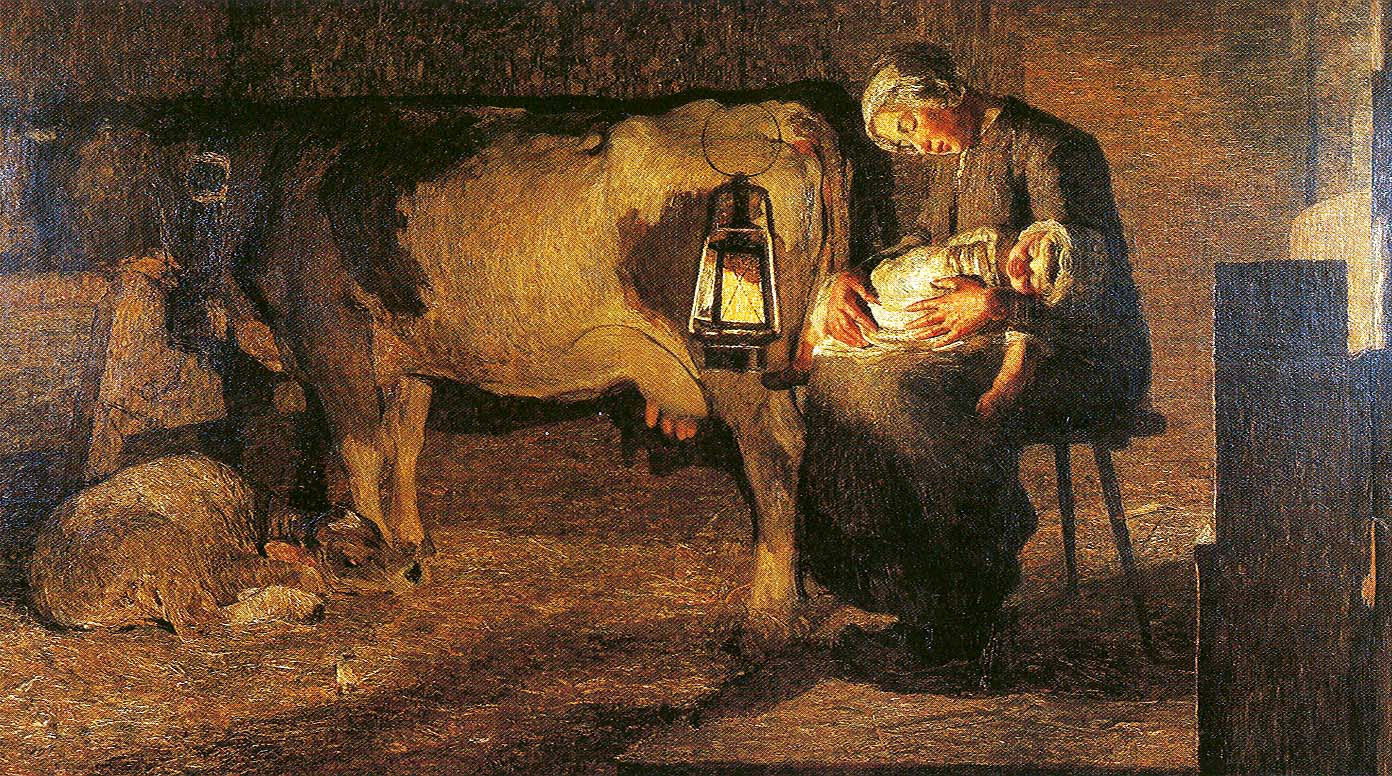
Segantini, The two mothers, 1889

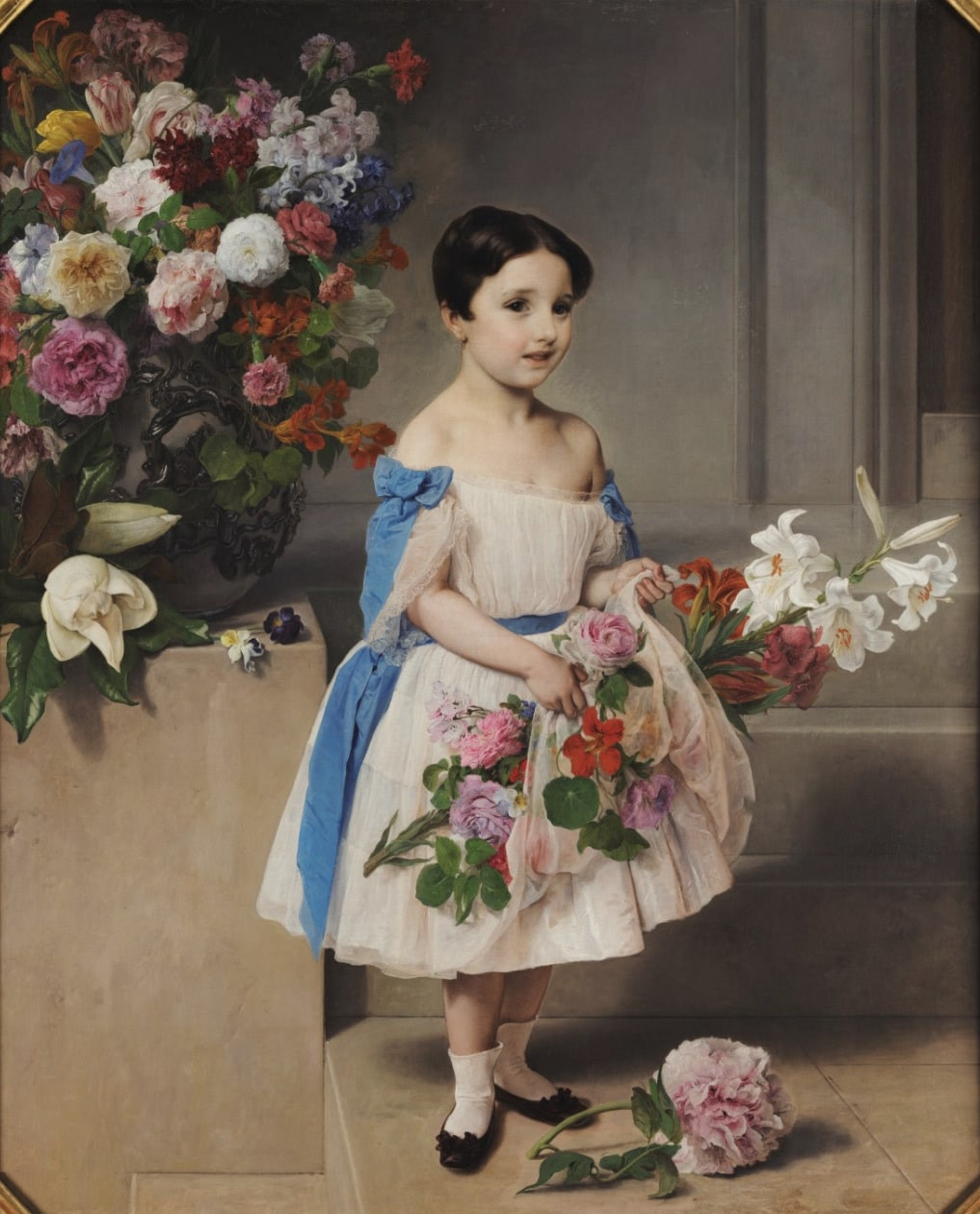
Hayez, Ritratto della contessina Antonietta Negroni Prati Morosini, 1858

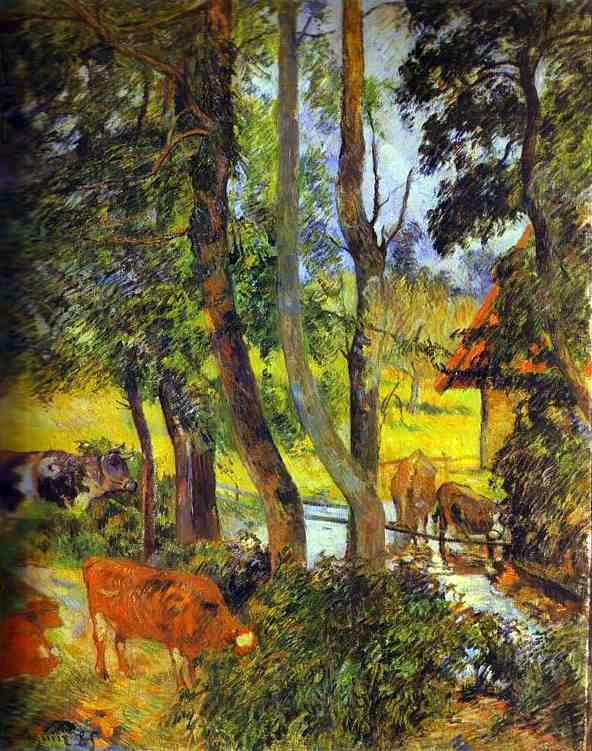
Gauguin, Vaches à l'abreuvoir, 1885

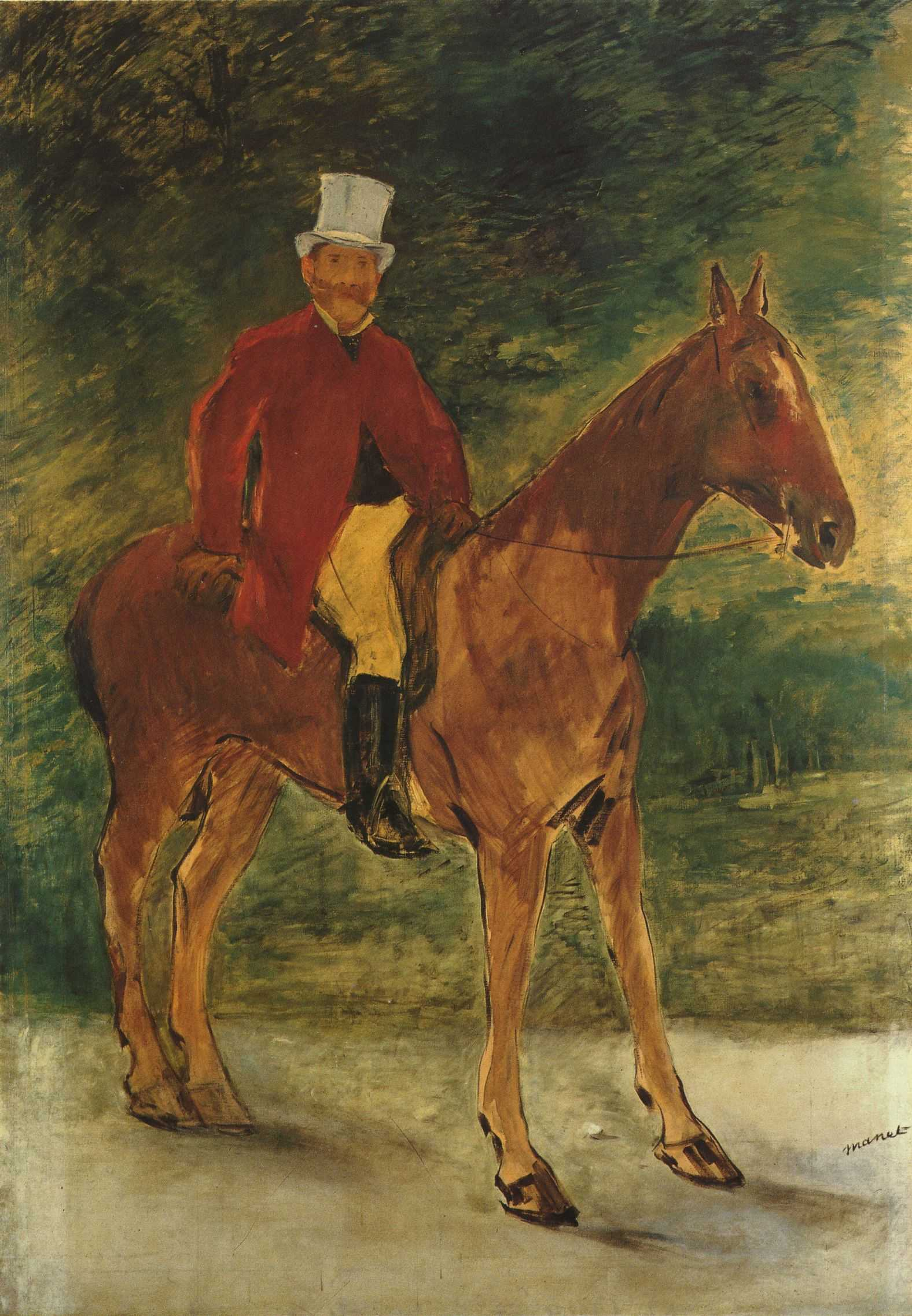
Manet, Portrait of M. Arnaud, 1875.
