= Pelagio Palagi =

Italian painter (1775–1860)

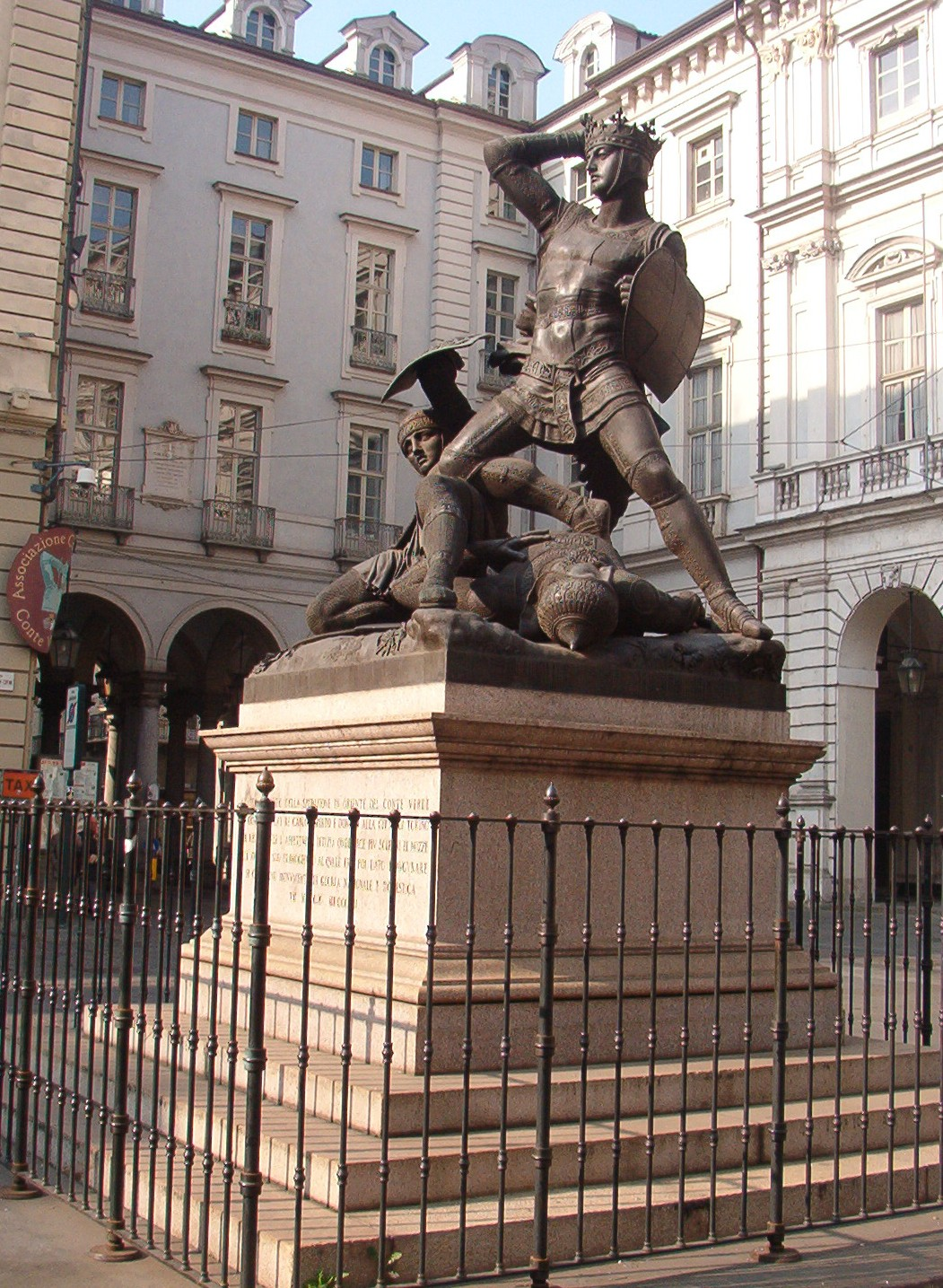
- Statue of Amadeus VI of Savoy by Pelagi, in Piazza Palazzo di Città, Turin
- Born: Pelagio Palagi; 25 May 1775; Bologna, Emilia Romagna, Italy
- Died: 6 March 1860 (aged 84); Turin, Piedmont, Italy
- Known for: Sculpture, painting, interior decoration
- Patrons: Carlo Filippo Aldrovandi

Pelagio Palagi (25 May 1775 – 6 March 1860) was an Italian painter, sculptor and interior decorator.

== Biography ==
=== Early life ===
Pelagi was born in Bologna on 25 May 1775. Starting at a very young age the study of perspective, architecture, figurative and portrait painting, and collecting by Carlo Filippo Aldrovandi, he continued his studies at the school of nudes of the Accademia Clementina of Bologna. His formation and first works overlapped with the arrival of the Napoleonic troops in the city; thanks to the request of his mentor, who was a member of the Senate and representative of the Bolognese provisional government, Palagi designed uniforms, medals, and emblems with the symbols of Liberté, égalité, fraternité to be used in letters and cards for the Directory. Later, the new emerging bourgeoisie entrusted him with the creation of the monumental sepulchres of Edoardo Pepoli (1801), Girolamo Bolognini Amorini (1803), and Luigi Sampieri (1804) at the Certosa di Bologna. He also decorated the residence interiors of the Cospi, Aldini, and Gozzadini families in 1805.

=== Rome ===
He moved to Rome in 1806 to complete his studies at the Accademia di San Luca, where he may have been Vincenzo Camuccini's student. This is not confirmed by all the writings of the time, but the Roman painter's historicism had undoubtedly an influence on Palagi's style. This influence is present in the Bolognese painter's portraits, in which he demonstrates a careful analysis of the models' features, as well as in his historical paintings and landscapes, which lead Palagi to conduct accurate research on ancient history and the study of nature. Examples of this elaboration and research are Portrait of Giuseppe Guizzardi in antique costume (1807), Marriage of Amore and Psyche (1808), Mario a Minturno (1809–1810), Ila e le ninfe (1810–1811), and most importantly the major works at the Gabinetto Topografico in the Palazzo del Quirinale (1811–1813) and the Galleria di Teseo in the Palazzo Torlonia (1813–1815).

From 1813 Palagi was inspector of the Accademia Italiana and was in charge of following the activities of the young artists who were pensionists of the Accademia del Regno d'Italia in Rome. Together with Antonio Canova, president of the Accademia, the artist was able to gather the most representative young artists of the Italian Neoclassicism, from Felice Giani to Gaspare Landi, besides the abovementioned Camuccini. The experience in Rome helped Palagi to deepen his interest in archaeology and collecting, already developed during his youth in Bologna.

=== Milan ===
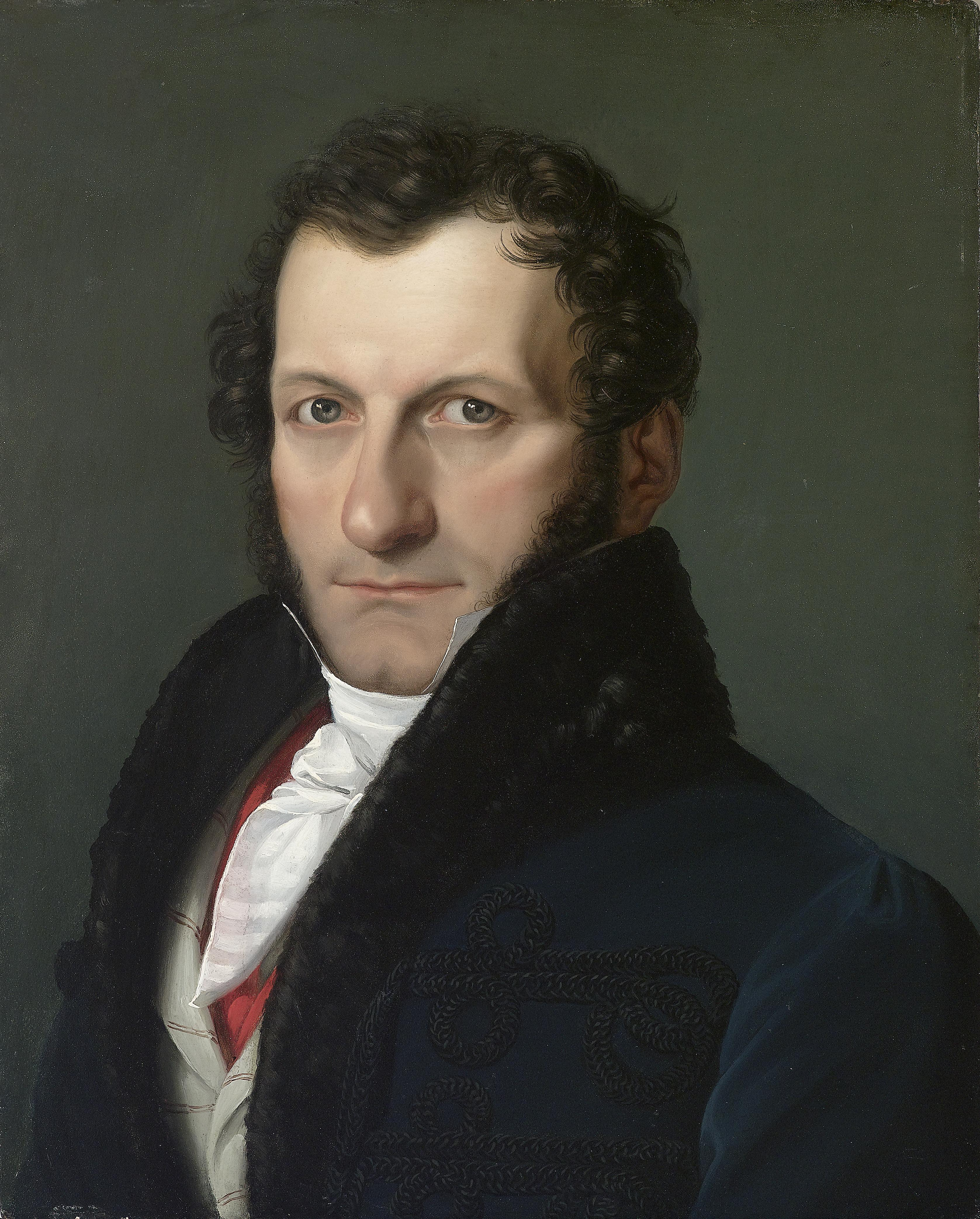
Conte Colonnello Teodoro Arese Lucini

In 1815, after a brief stay in Bologna, the artist moved to Milan, where he opened a private school in open competition with the Accademia di Brera, which never granted him a teaching position. In the Lombard capital the private clientele, wider and more stimulating than the one in Rome, lead with to dedicate himself to portrait painting, especially of Giuseppe Bossi and Andrea Appiani; the public commissions asserted him as the portrayer of the protagonists of the Restoration. Some works that straddle between the 1810s and 1820s are some of his portraits including those of Conte colonnello Francesco Arese Lucini nello studio, Luigi Archinto, Francesco I d’Austria (all of them made in 1817), Maggiore Pietro Lattuada (1822), Cristina Archinto Trivulzio (1824) and Ballerina Carlotta Chabert come Diana (1828–1830).

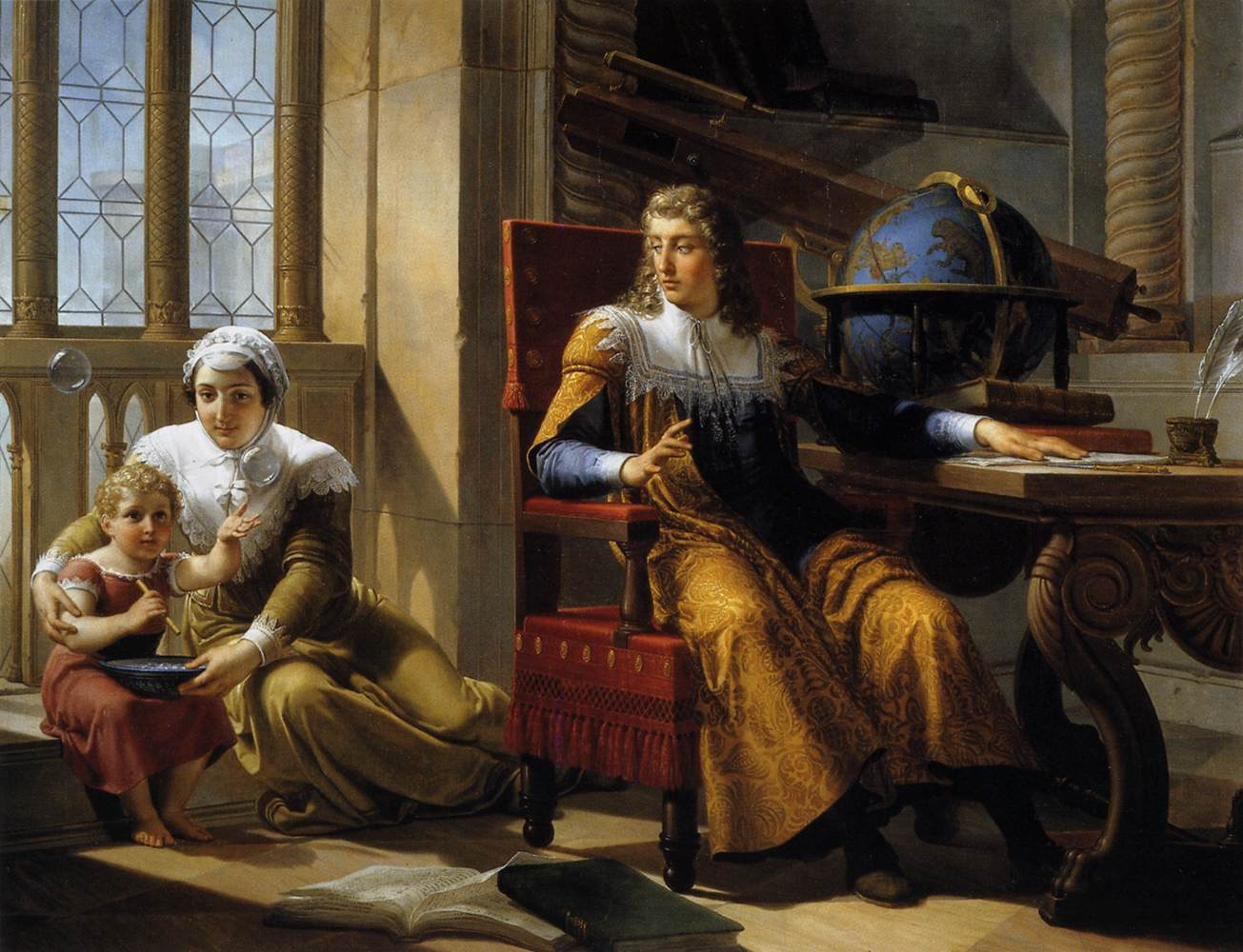
Newton Discovers Refraction of Light (1827)

The encounter with Francesco Hayez, the leading artist of Lombard Romanticism, induced in Palagi a search for a compromise between historical-romantic painting and classicist formation. Product of this pursuit are Gian Galeazzo Sforza visitato in Pavia da Carlo VIII, Gustavo Adolfo Re di Svezia che fa giurare fedeltà alla figlia Cristina dagli Stati Generali, Sisto V non riconosce la famiglia and La difesa di Matteo Visconti, all of them exhibited at Bera between 1821 and 1830, and Ratto delle Sabine (1823–1825).

By the end of the decade Palagi obtained the commission for the architectural and decorative intervention, and sculpture design of the Palazzo Arese Lucini and the Villa Tittoni Traversi.

=== Later career ===
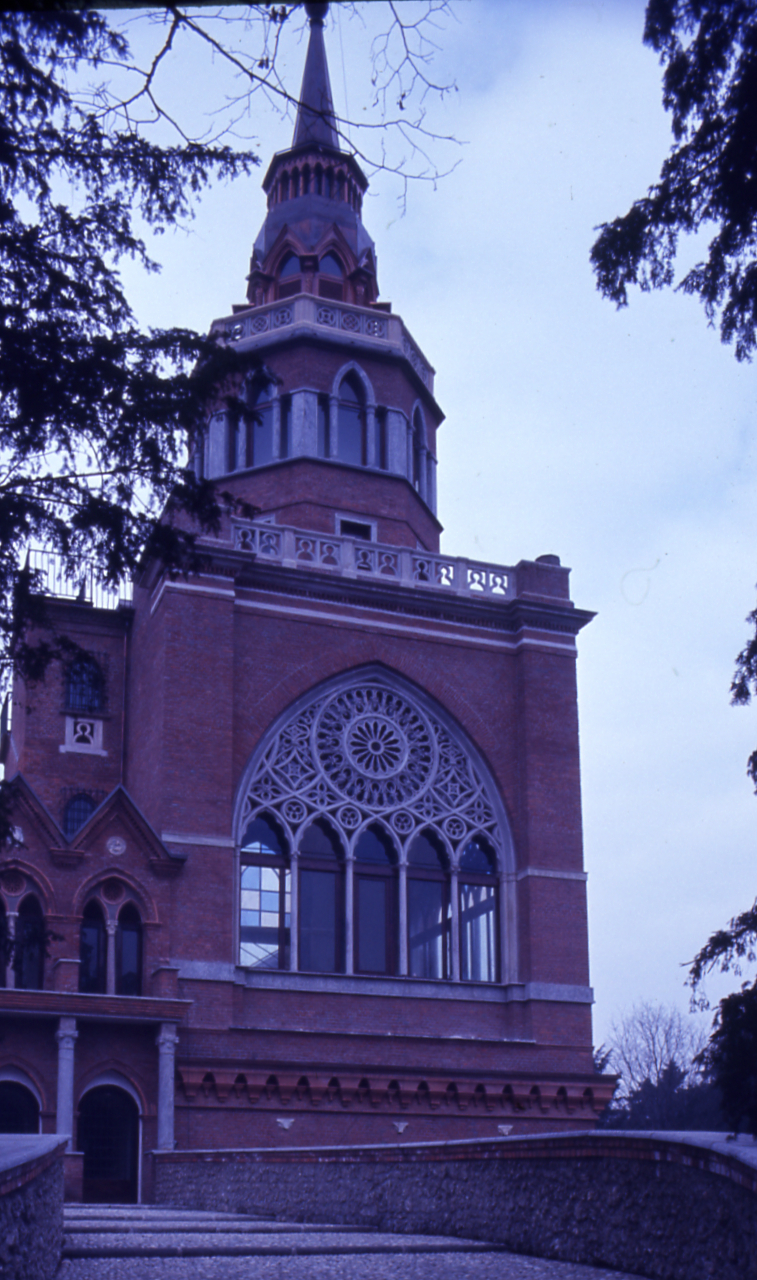
The Pelagio Palagi tower in Desio. Photo by Paolo Monti, 1976.

His fame as an architect, interior decorator, sculptor and furniture designer, as well as painter, reached the court of the Savoys, and in 1832 the king Carlo Alberto designated him head of the enlargement project of the Castle of Racconigi. Palagi moved to Turin after obtaining in 1834 the head position of the pictorial and decorative restoration project of the Castello di Pollenzo and the modernization project of the Royal Palace of Turin. In the same year he was given the Chair of Decoration (Cattedra di Ornato) of the Accademia Albertina.

Palagi died in Turin on 6 March 1860, aged 84.

== Legacy ==
A few days before his passing, Palagi wrote a will in which the Comune di Bologna was named heir of all his antiques and artworks, medals, library, archive and drawings. The library, archive and drawings are preserved at the Biblioteca comunale dell'Archiginnasio, the objects of his collections are found at the Museo Civico Archeologico and the Museo Civico Medievale of the city.

Among his pupils from his Academy in Milan were Vitale Sala from Cernusco, Carlo Bellosio from Bellagio, Sigismondo Nappi, Cesare Borromeo, Antongina, Luigi Fontana, Giovanni Battista Ajraghi, Ambrogio Riva, Carlo Gerosa, Giovanni Pagani, Luigi Zuccoli, and Gaetano Barabini.

== Sources ==
- Tambroni, Giuseppe (1816). Descrizione dei dipinti a buon fresco eseguiti in una galleria del palazzo del Sig. Duca di Bracciano in Roma dal Signor Pelagio Palagi.. Rome: Stamperia de Romanis.
- Caini, Antonio (1862). Delle arti del disegno e degli artisti nelle provincie di Lombardia dal 1777-1862. Milan: Luigi di Giacomo Pirola.
- Pelagio Palagi artista e collezionista. Bologna: Grafis. 1976.
- Claudio Poppi, ed. (1996). Pelagio Palagi pittore. Dipinti dalle raccolte del Comune di Bologna. Milan: Electa.
- Roncuzzi Roversi-Monaco, Valeria; Saccone, Sandra (2001). "Librerie private nella biblioteca pubblica. Doni, lasciti e acquisti". In Pierangelo Bellettini (ed.). Biblioteca comunale dell'Archiginnasio, Bologna. Fiesole-Florence: Nardini. pp. 91–117.
- Carla Bernardini, ed. (2004). Pelagio Palagi alle collezioni Comunali d'arte. Bologna, palazzo Comunale, Collezioni comunali d'arte. Ferrara: Edisai. ISBN 978-8888051581.
- Giuseppe Carità, ed. (2004). Pollenzo. Una città romana per una real villeggiatura romantica. Savigliano: L'Artistica. ISBN 978-8873200901.
- Carla Bernardini; Anna Maria Matteucci; Antonella Mampieri, eds. (2007). Magnifiche prospettive. Palagi e il sogno dell’antico. Ferrara: Edisai. ISBN 978-8895062365.
