= Gallerie di Piazza Scala =

Museum in Milan, Italy

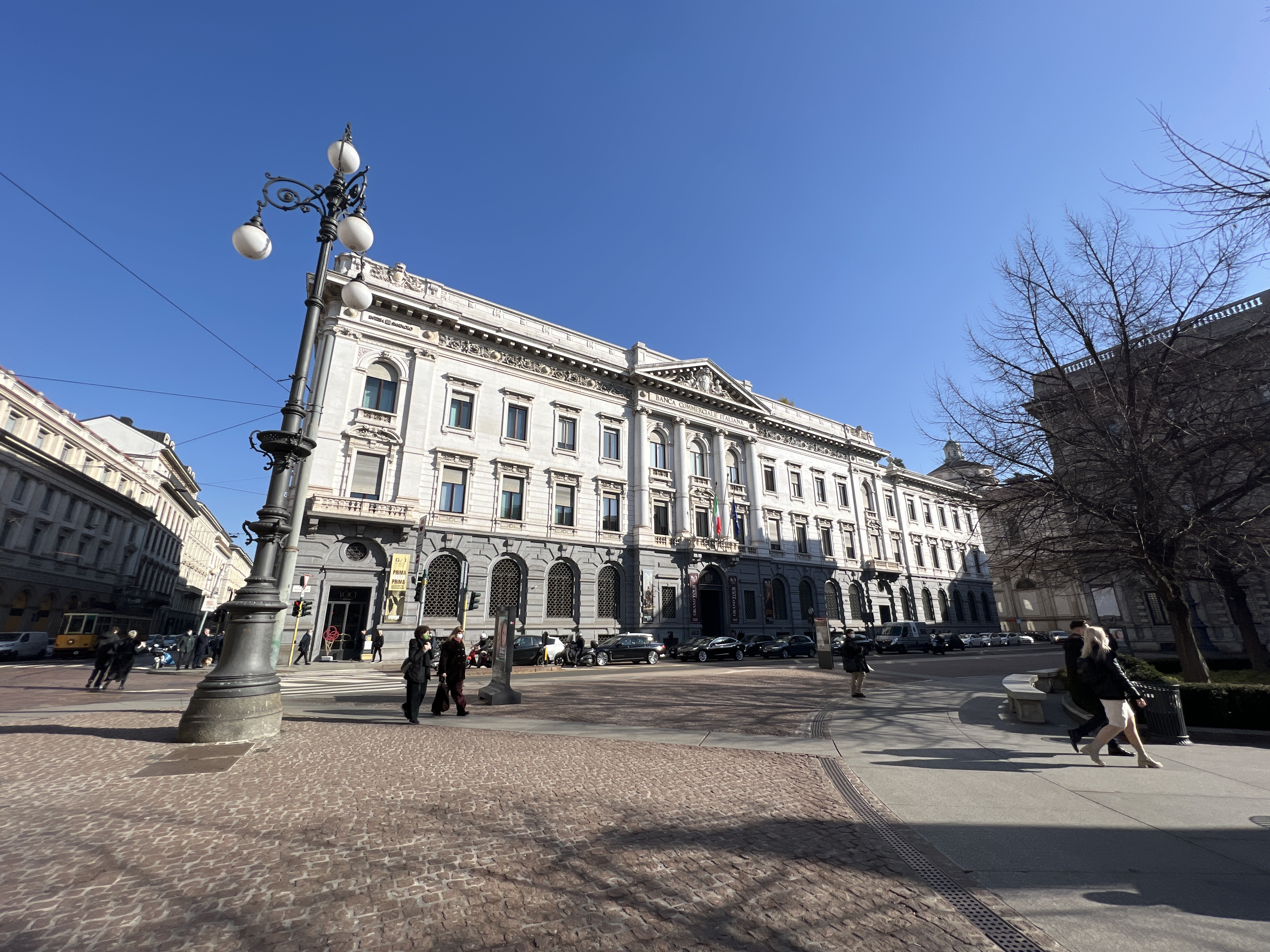
- Established: November 3, 2011; 14 years ago
- Location: Piazza della Scala 6 Milan, Italy
- Coordinates: 45.468269°N 9.191024°E
- Director: Andrea M. Massari
- Website: www.gallerieditalia.com/it/homepage/milano/

The Gallerie d'Italia - Milano is a modern and contemporary museum in Milan, Italy. Located in Piazza della Scala in the Palazzo Brentani and the Palazzo Anguissola Antona Traversi, it hosts 195 artworks from the collections of Fondazione Cariplo with a strong representation of nineteenth century Lombard painters and sculptors, including Antonio Canova and Umberto Boccioni. A new section was opened in the Palazzo della Banca Commerciale Italiana on October 25, 2012 with 189 art works from the twentieth century.

During the 2017 Corporate Art Awards Ceremony hosted by the President of the Italian Republic Sergio Mattarella at the Quirinal Palace, Gallerie d'Italia - Milano received a special award as “Patron of the XXI century”.

== Nineteenth Century ==
=== Sections ===
==== Section I: Canova bas reliefs ====
The works of Antonio Canova in Rezzonico reliefs. Between Socratic Homeric epics and ethics, between Christian virtues and enlightened philanthropy (Rooms 1, 2, 3 and 4).

Artworks
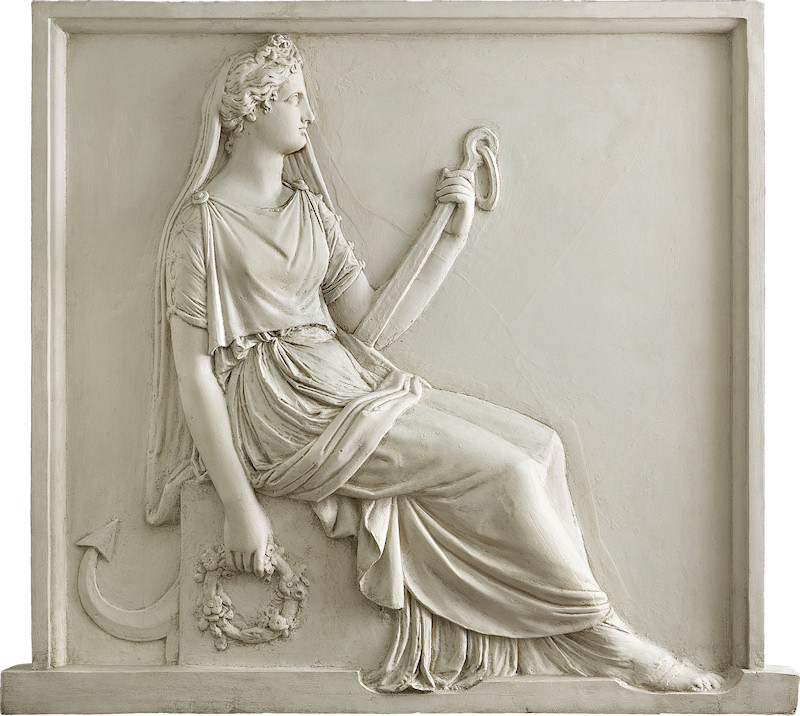
1. La speranza, 1792

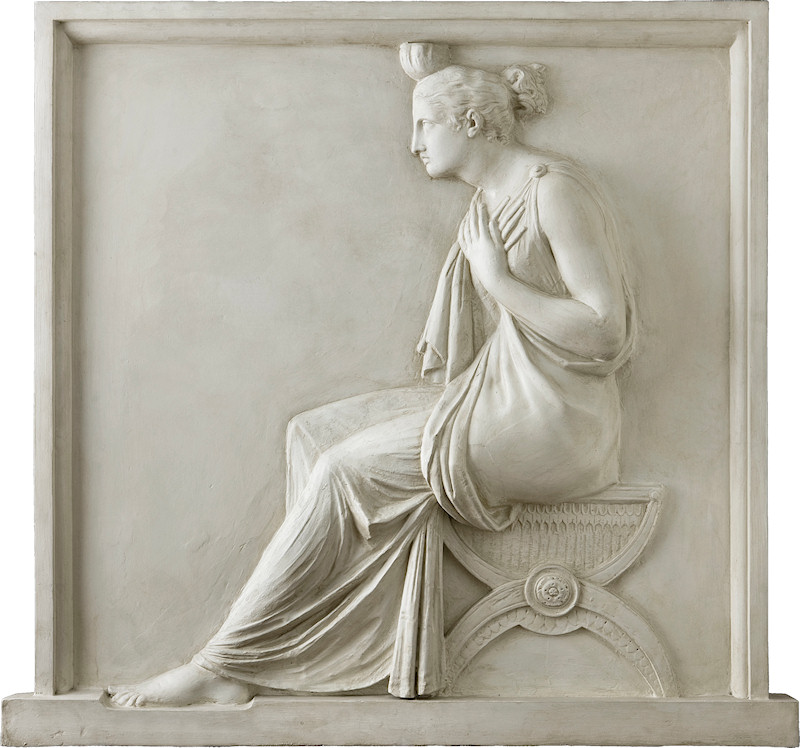
2. La carità, 1792

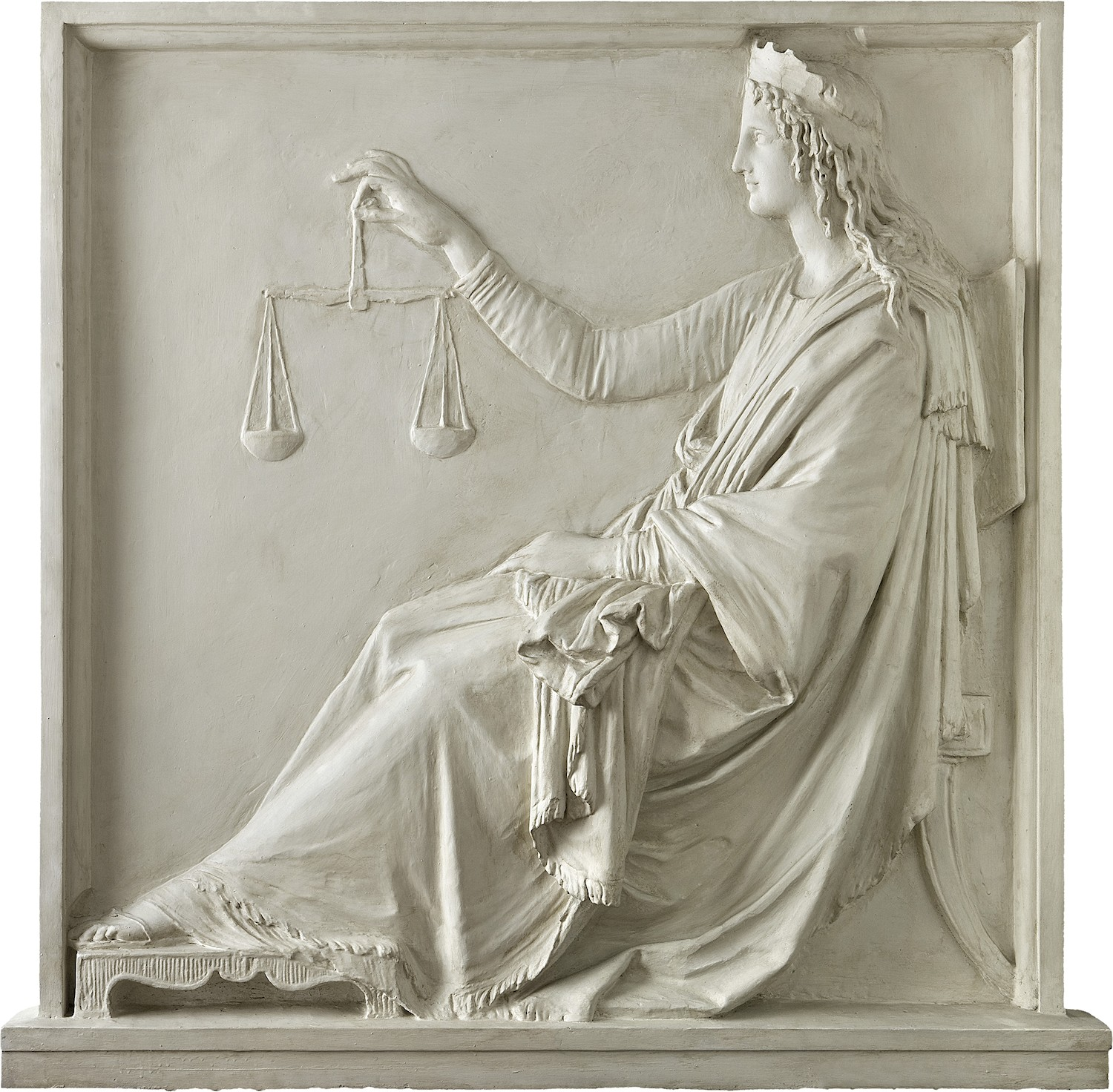
3. La giustizia, 1792

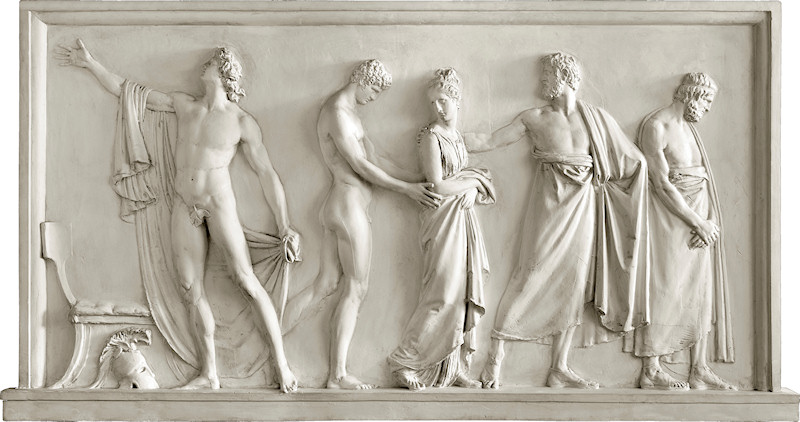
4. Briseide consegnata da Achille agli araldi di Agamennone, 1787-1790

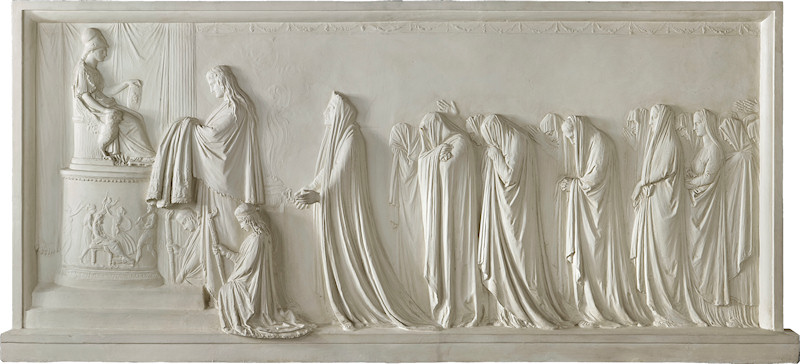
5. Ecuba e le donne troiane offrono il peplo a Pallade, 1790-1792

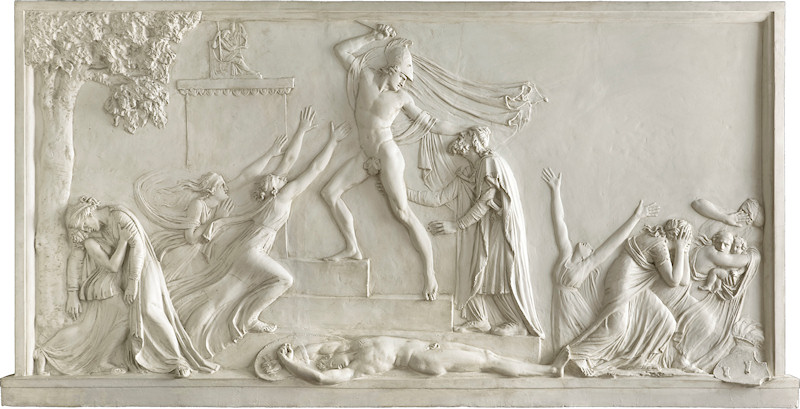
6. Morte di Priamo, 1787-1790

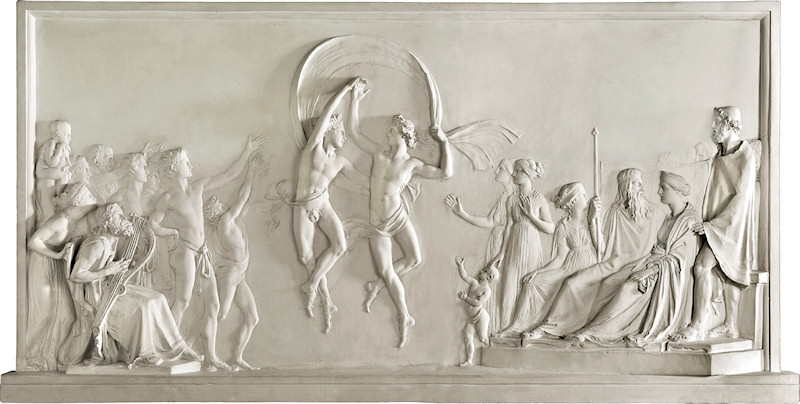
7. Danza dei figli di Alcinoo, 1790-1792

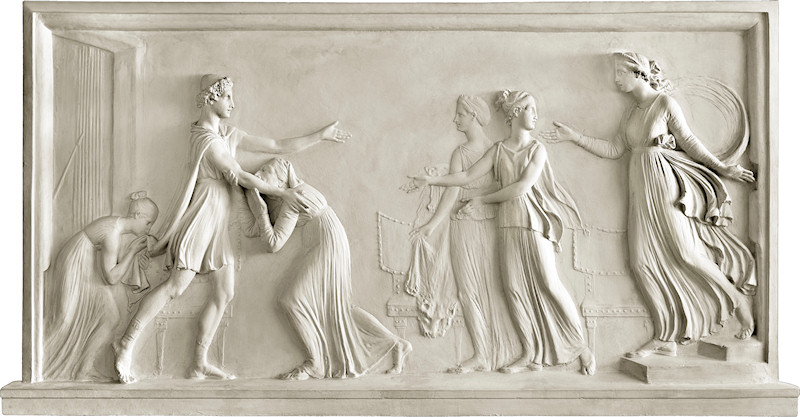
8. Ritorno di Telemaco a Itaca e incontro con Penelope, 1787-1790

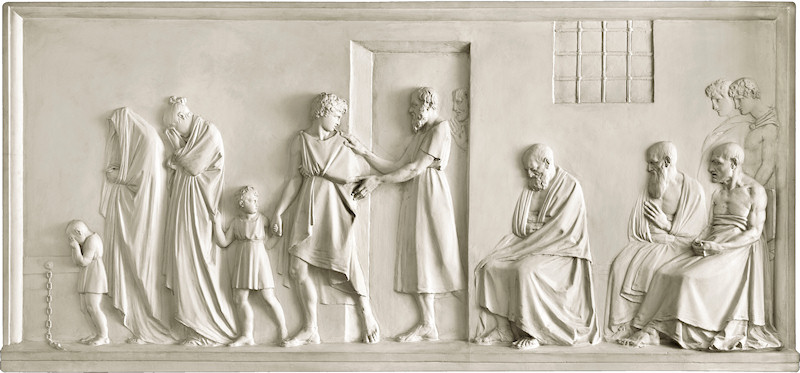
9. Socrate congeda la propria famiglia, 1787-1790

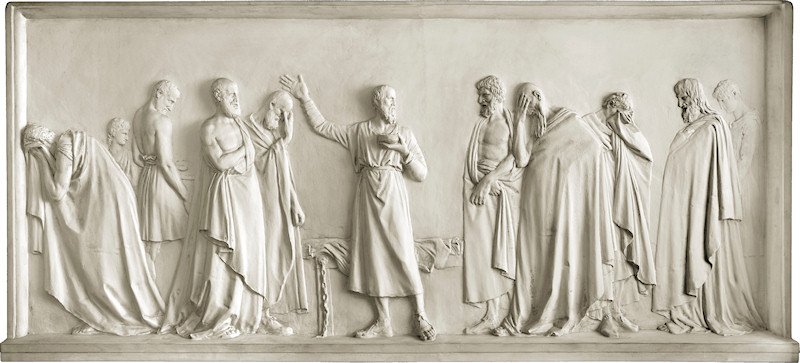
10. Socrate beve la cicuta, 1787-1790

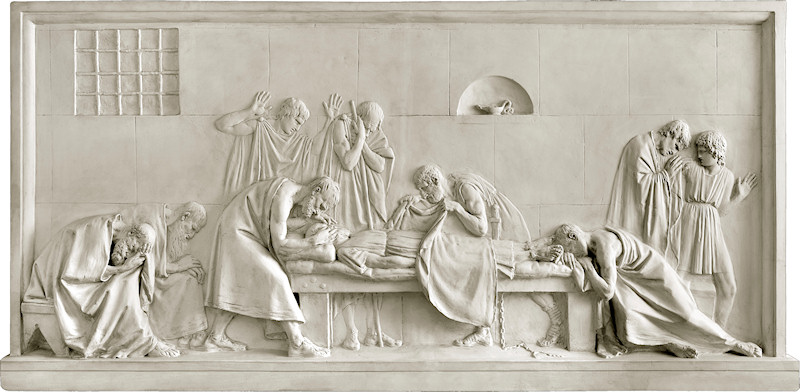
11. Critone chiude gli occhi a Socrate, 1790-1792

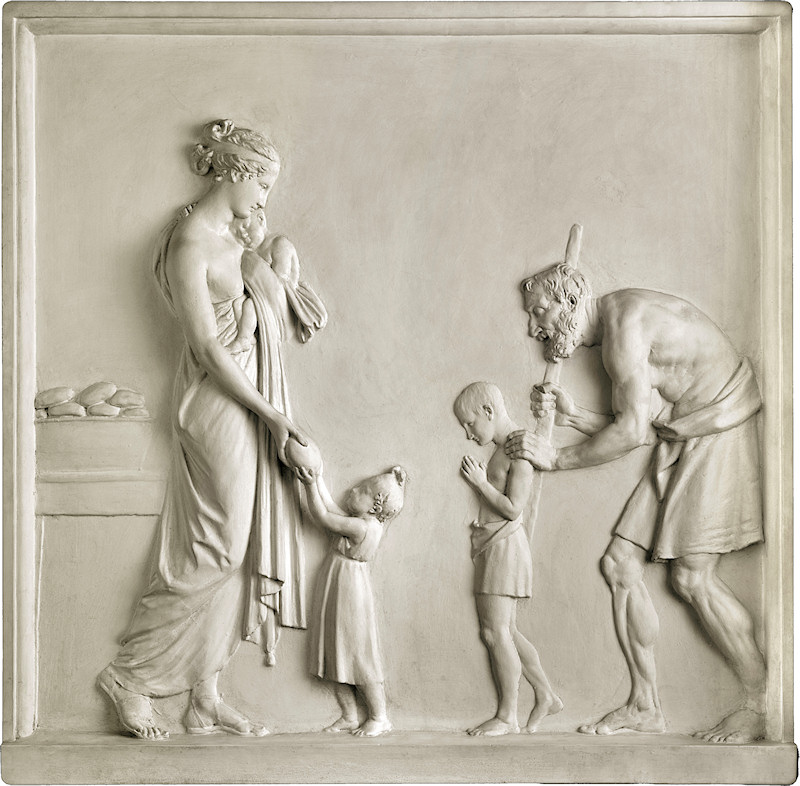
12. Dare da mangiare agli affamati, 1795

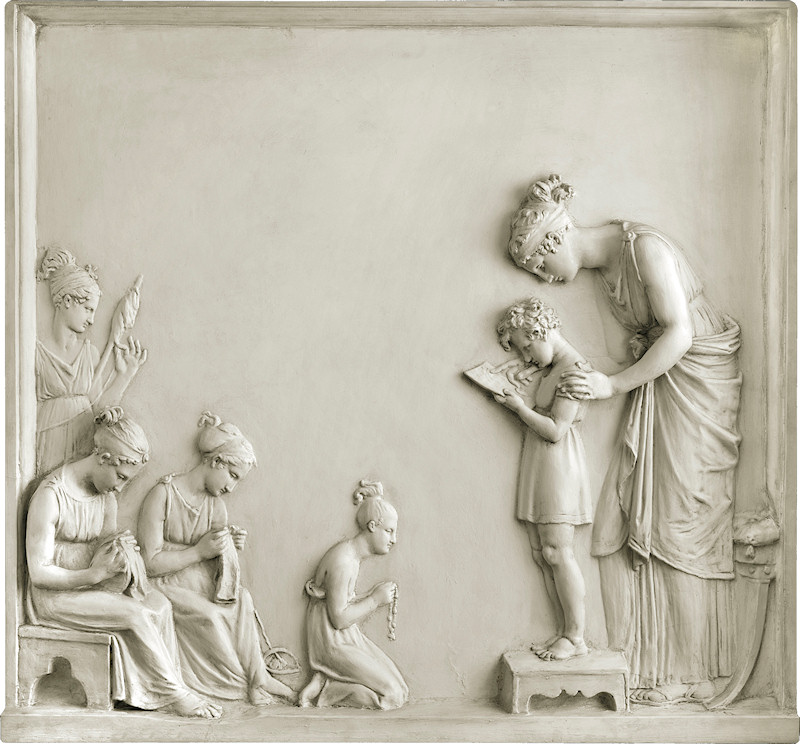
13. Insegnare agli ignoranti, 1795

==== Section II: Hayez and painters of Romanticism ====
Francesco Hayez and the great romantic themes. Between historic painting and melodrama (Room 5).

Artworks
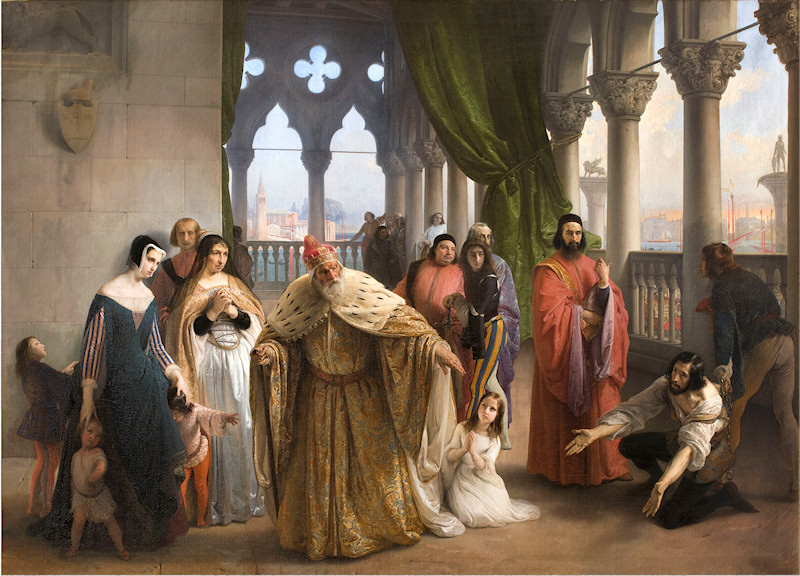
14. L'ultimo abboccamento di Jacopo Foscari con la propria famiglia (I due Foscari), 1838-1840

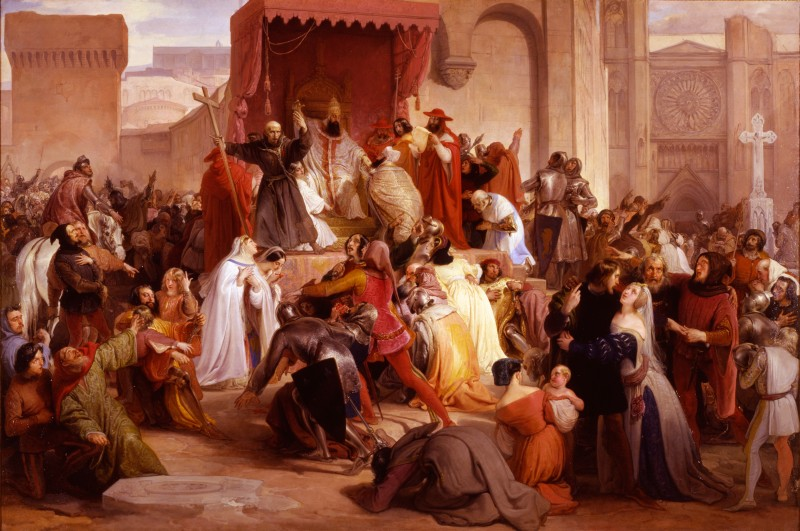
15. Papa Urbano II sulla piazza di Clermont predica la prima crociata, 1835

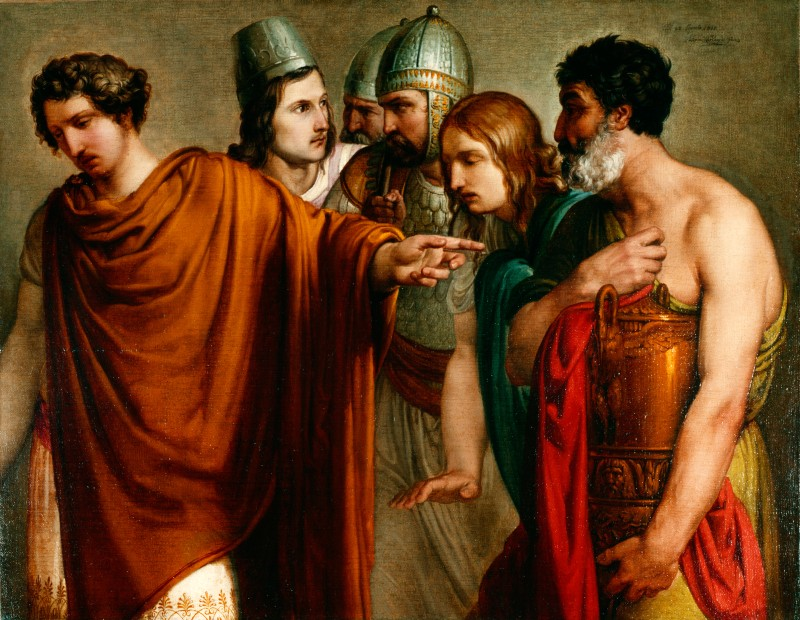
16. La morte di Abradate, 1813

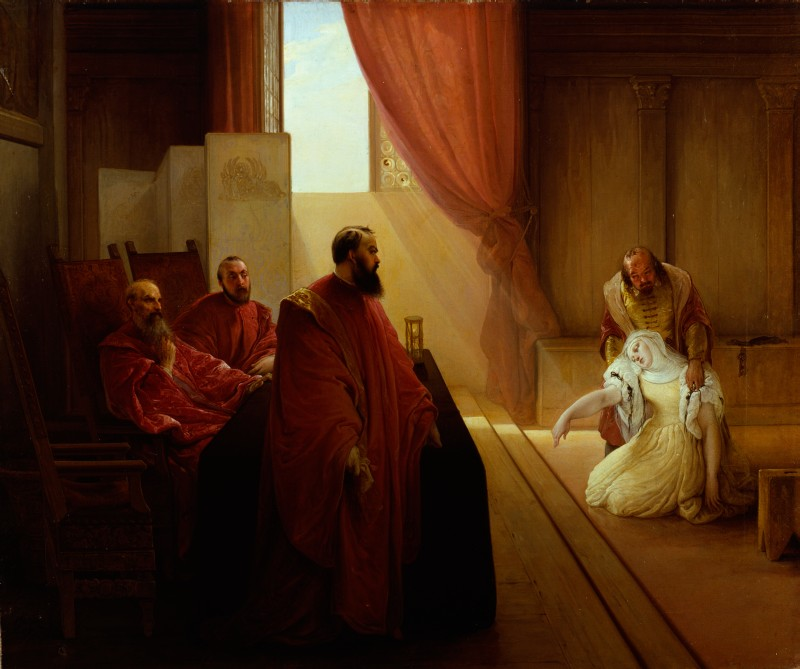
17. Valenza Gradenigo davanti agli Inquisitori, 1835

==== Section III: Giovanni Migliara and Vedutistas of the Romanticism ====
Giovanni Migliara and the picturesque charm of the ancient monuments. Molteni, Pietro Ronzoni, il Piccio, Angelo Inganni, protagonists of the Lombard Romanticism (Rooms 6 and 7).

Artworks
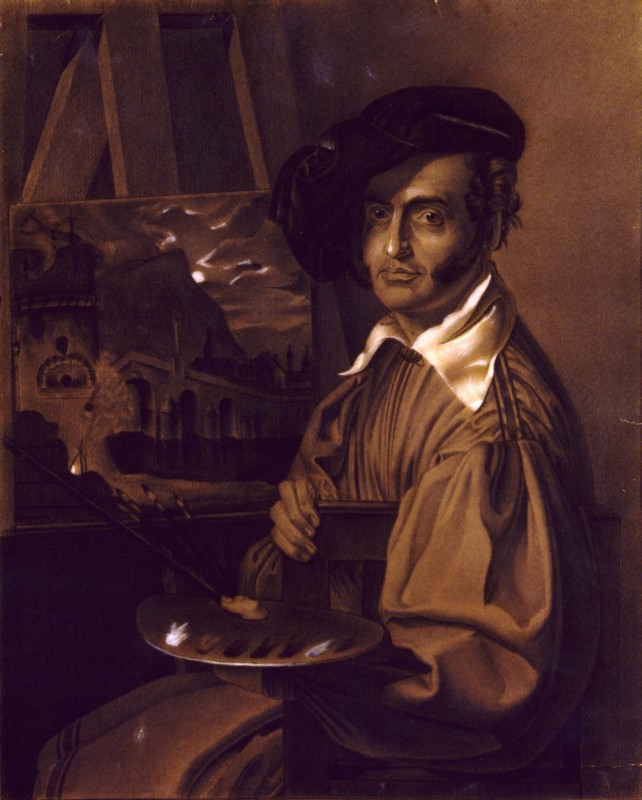
18. Giuseppe Molteni, Ritratto del pittore Giovanni Migliara seduto davanti al suo cavalletto, 1829

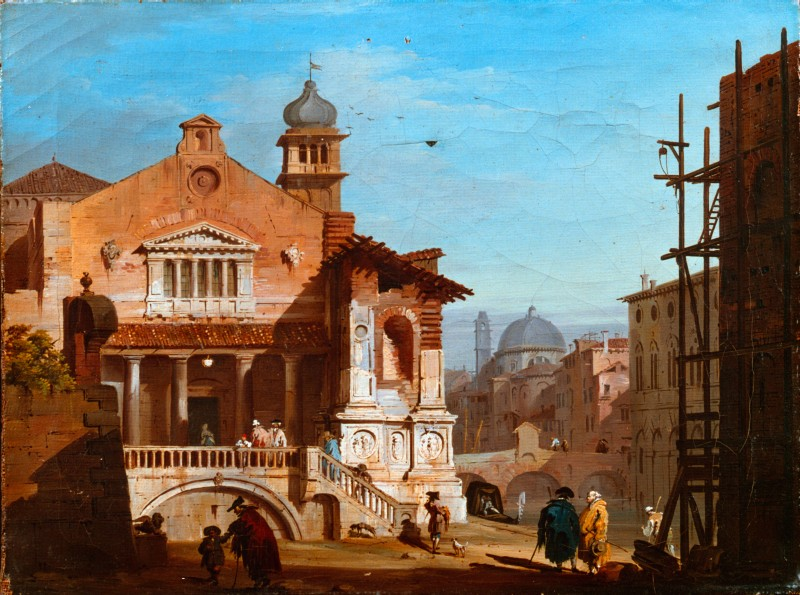
19. Giovanni Migliara, Capriccio veneziano, 1812-1815

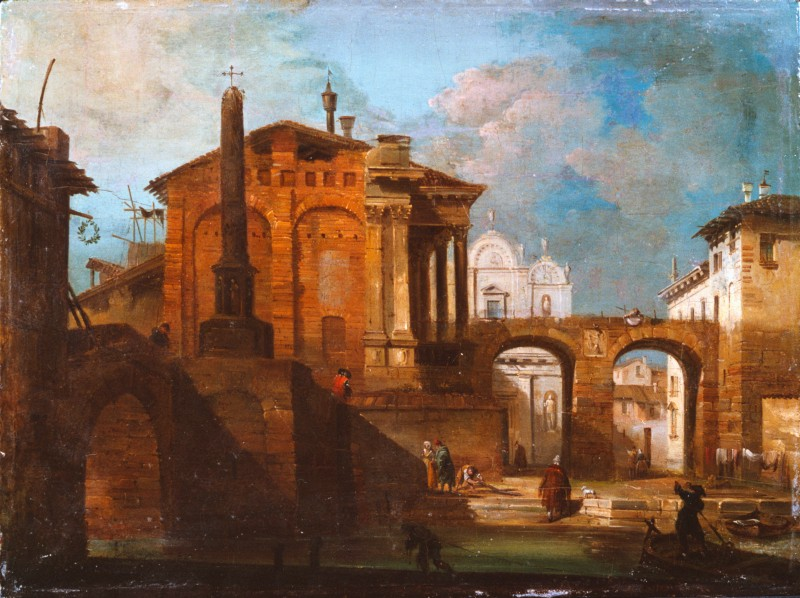
20. Giovanni Migliara, Capriccio veneziano, 1812-1815

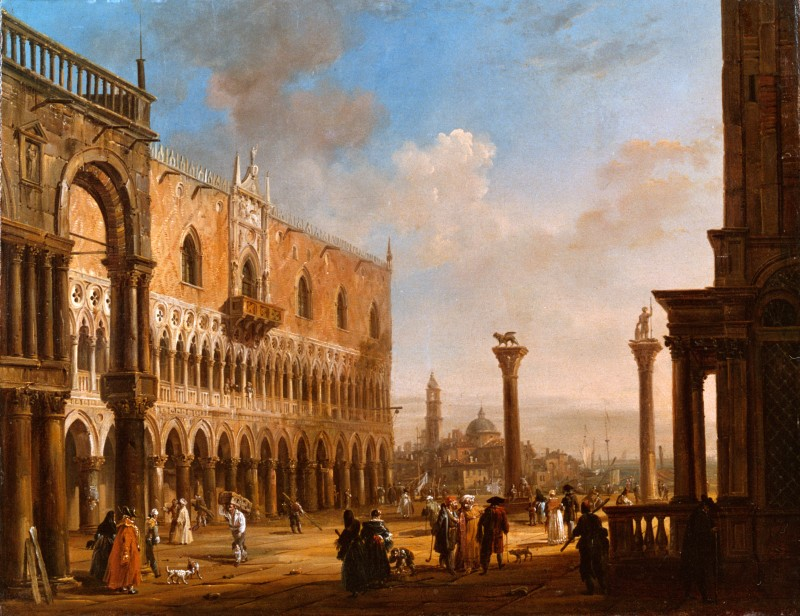
21. Giovanni Migliara, Veduta di Palazzo Ducale a Venezia, 1815

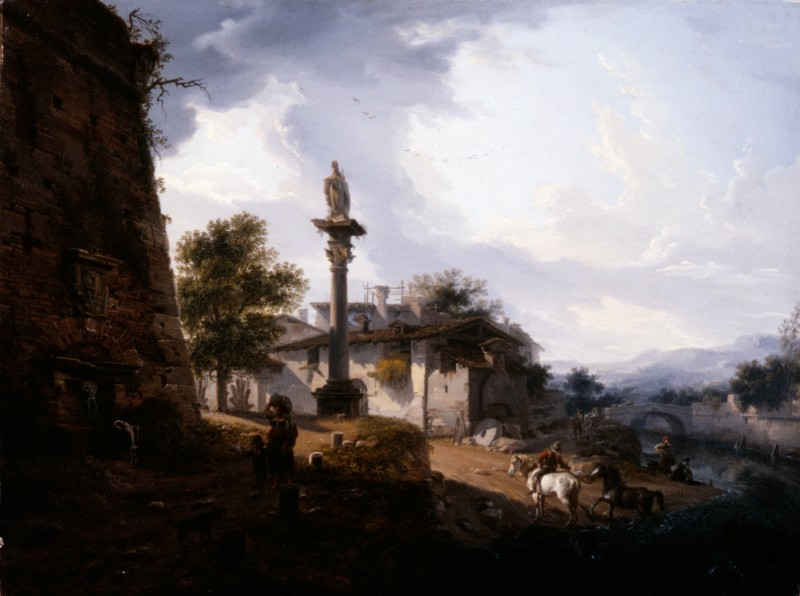
22. Giovanni Migliara, Veduta dei dintorni di Lecco, 1815-1820

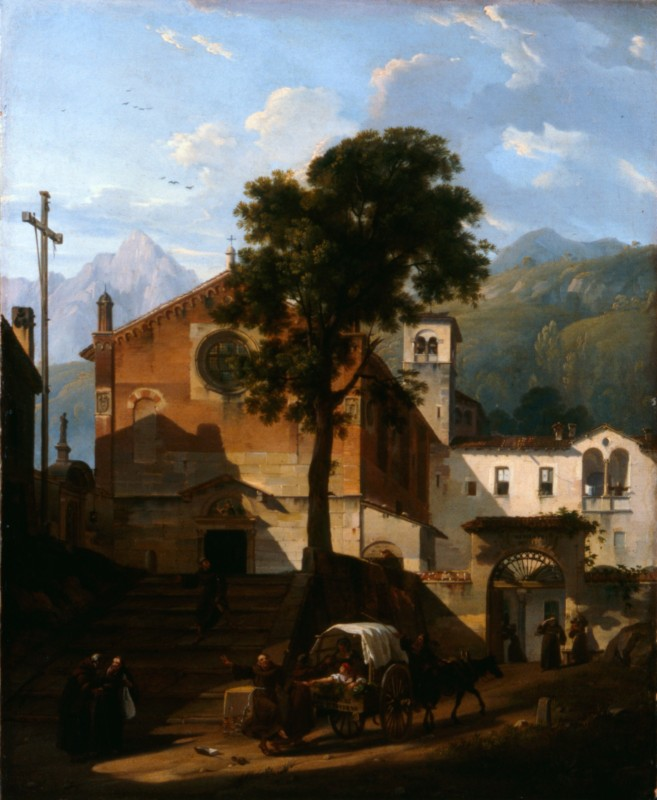
23. Giovanni Migliara, Il ritorno dei Padri Cappuccini nel convento dopo la cerca con la provisione invernale, 1825-1830

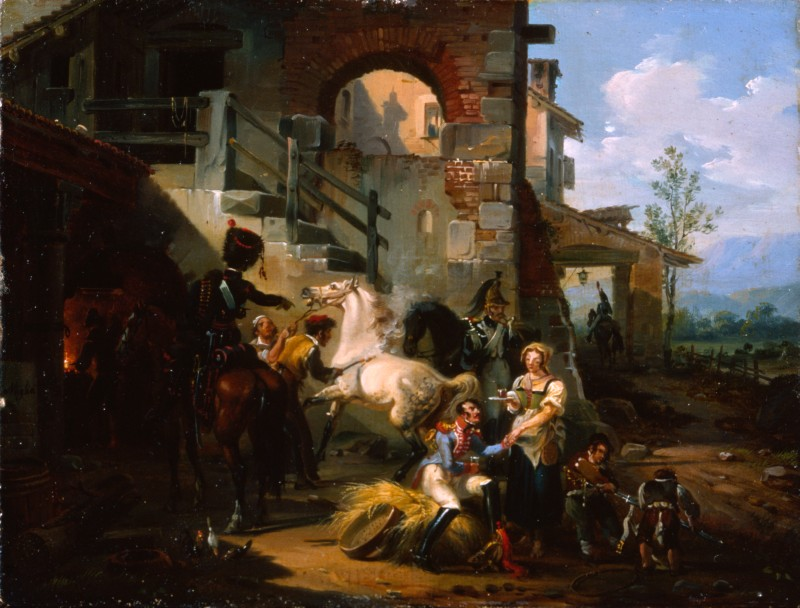
24. Giovanni Migliara, Paesaggio con cavalli, 1815-1818

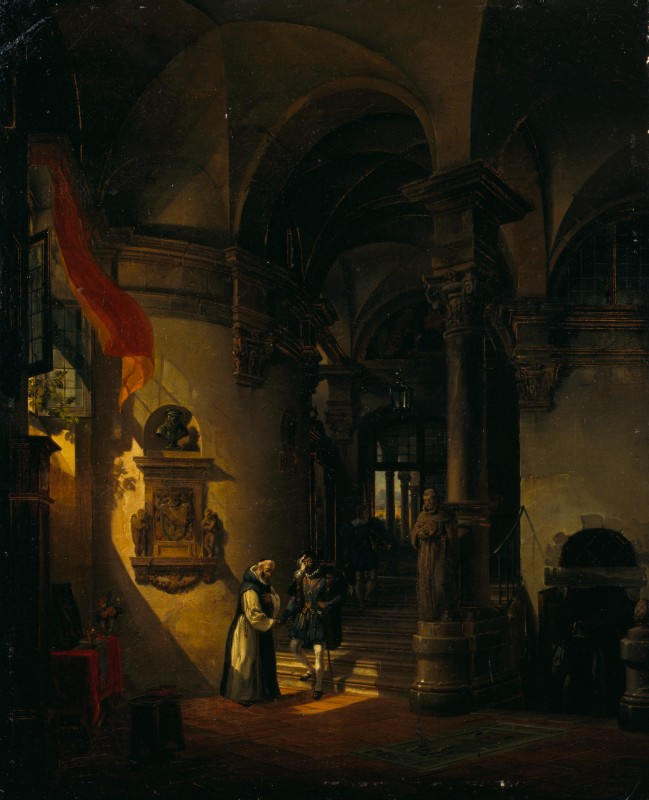
25. Giovanni Migliara, Carlo V si ritira nel convento di San Giusto nell'Estremadura, 1825-1830

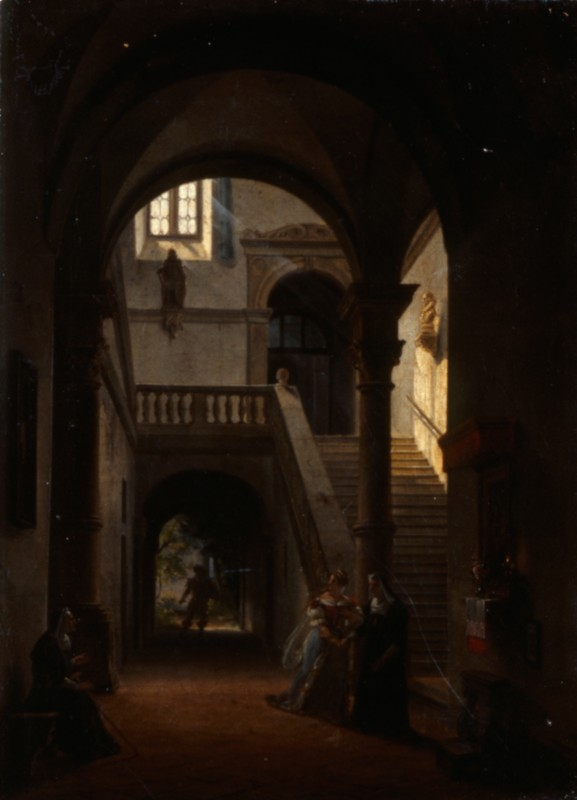
26. Giovanni Migliara, La Vallière visitata nel chiostro da Luigi XIV, 1821-1825

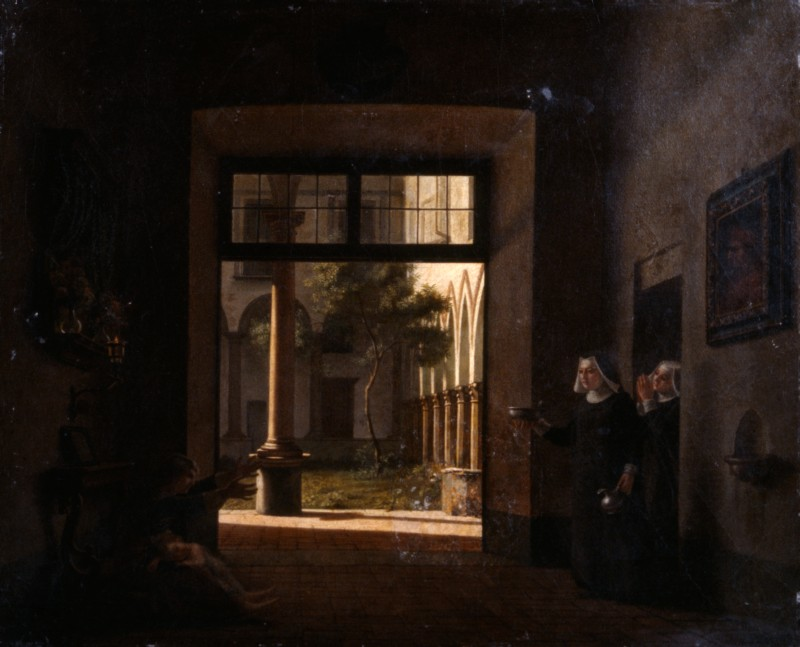
27. Giovanni Migliara, Interno di un chiostro del Monastero Maggiore a Milano, 1820-1825

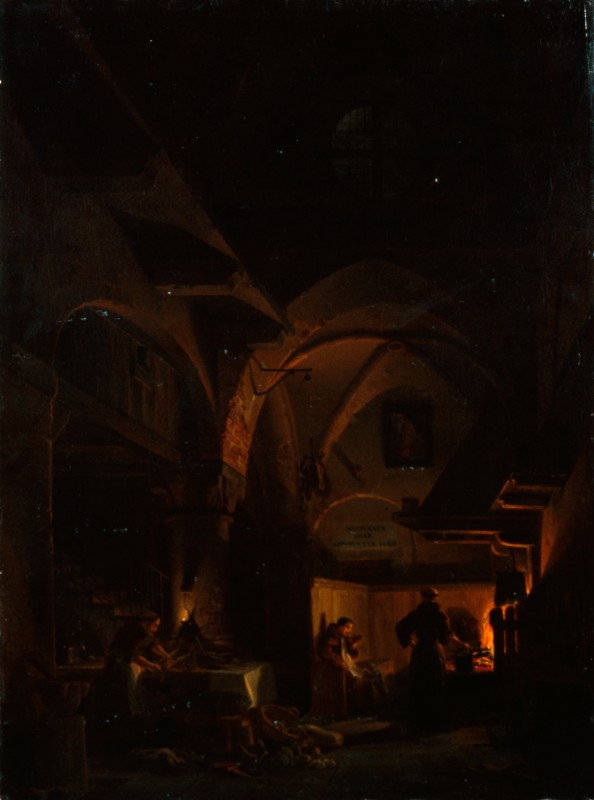
28. Giovanni Migliara, Frati in cucina, 1827

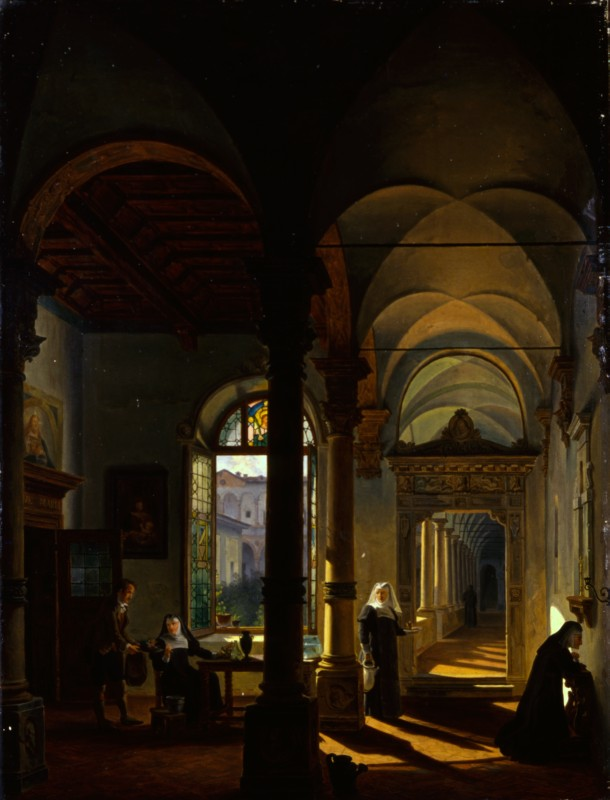
29. Giovanni Migliara, Interno di convento, 1832

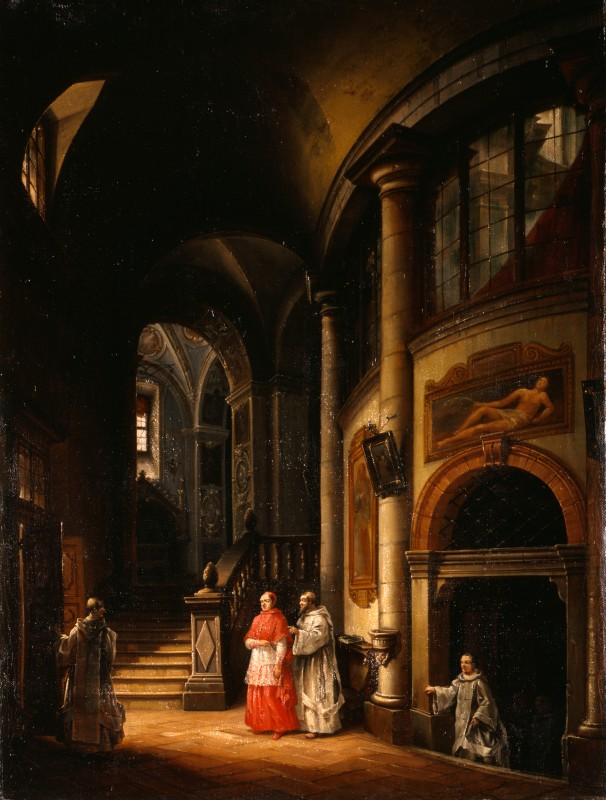
30. Teodolinda Sabaino Migliara, Interno della basilica di San Lorenzo a Milano, 1845 ca

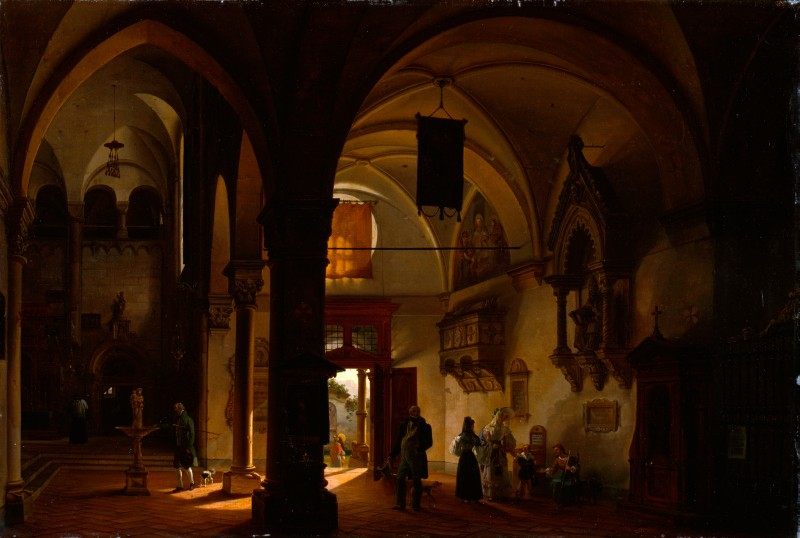
31. Giovanni Migliara, Interno di una chiesa, 1832

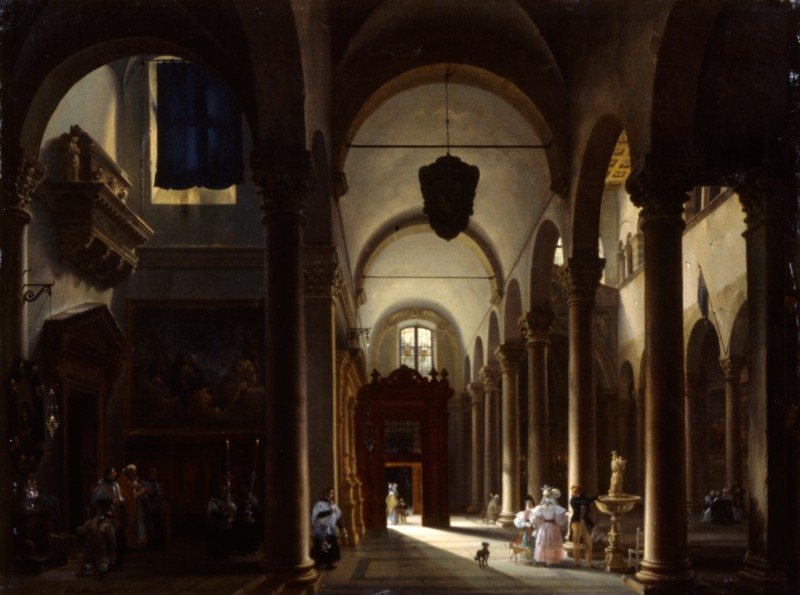
32. Giovanni Migliara, Interno del Duomo di Pisa, 1835

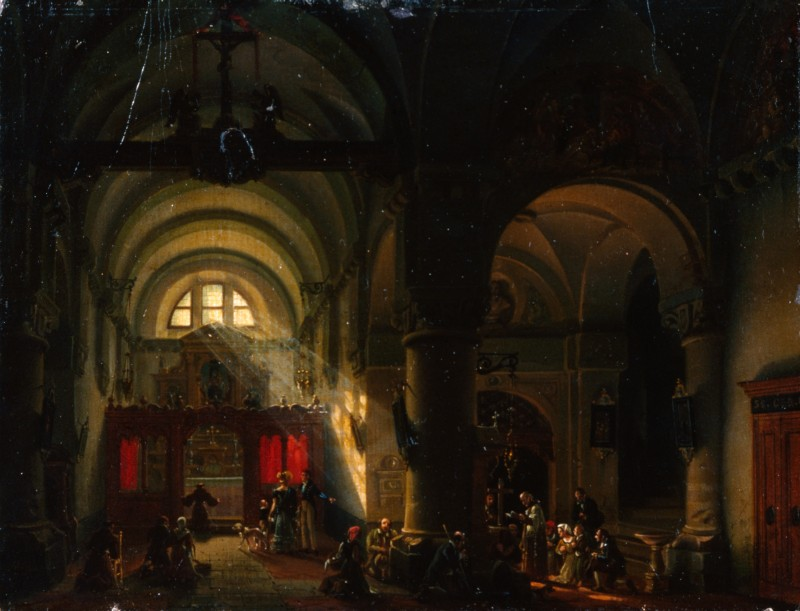
33. Giovanni Migliara, Interno di una chiesa, 1815-1825

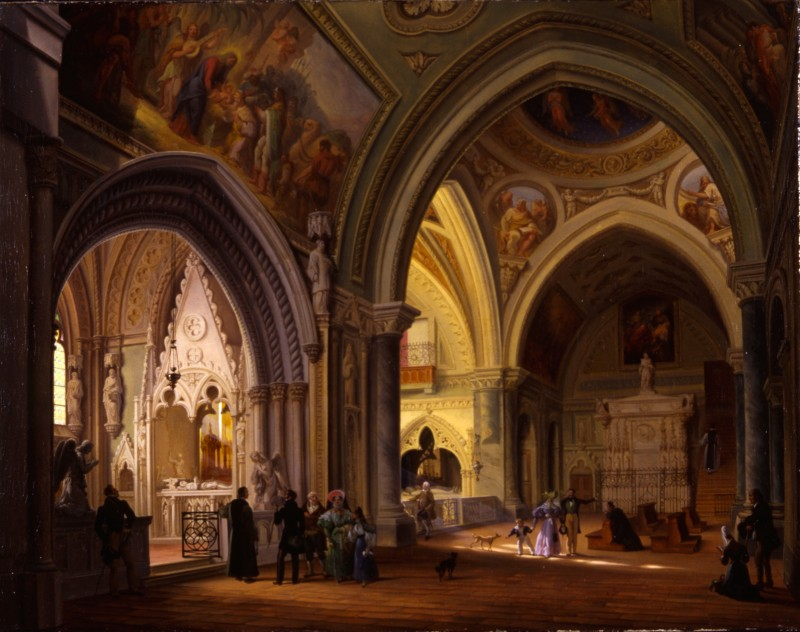
34. Giovanni Migliara, Interno del monastero di Altacomba, 1833

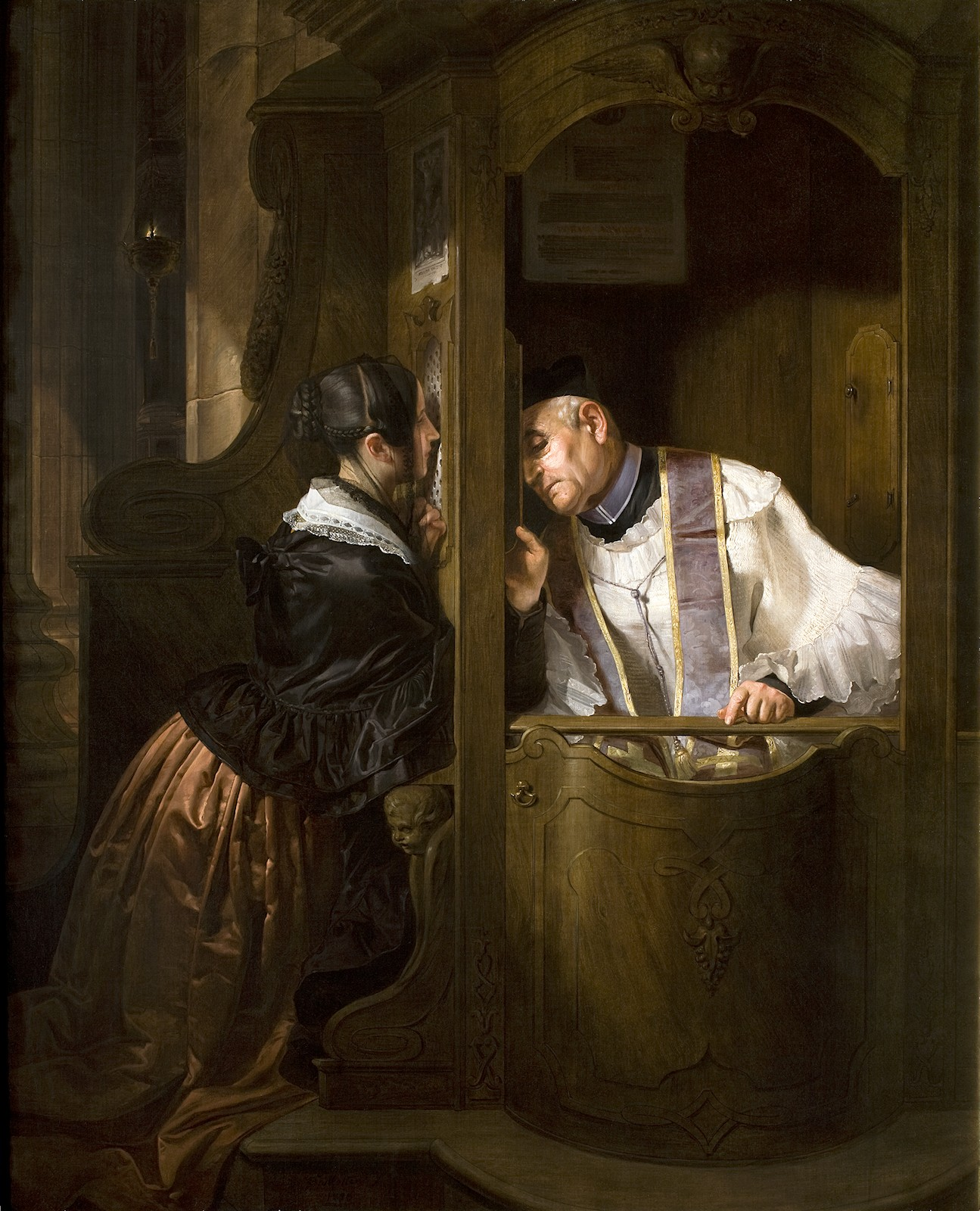
35. Giuseppe Molteni, The Confession, 1838

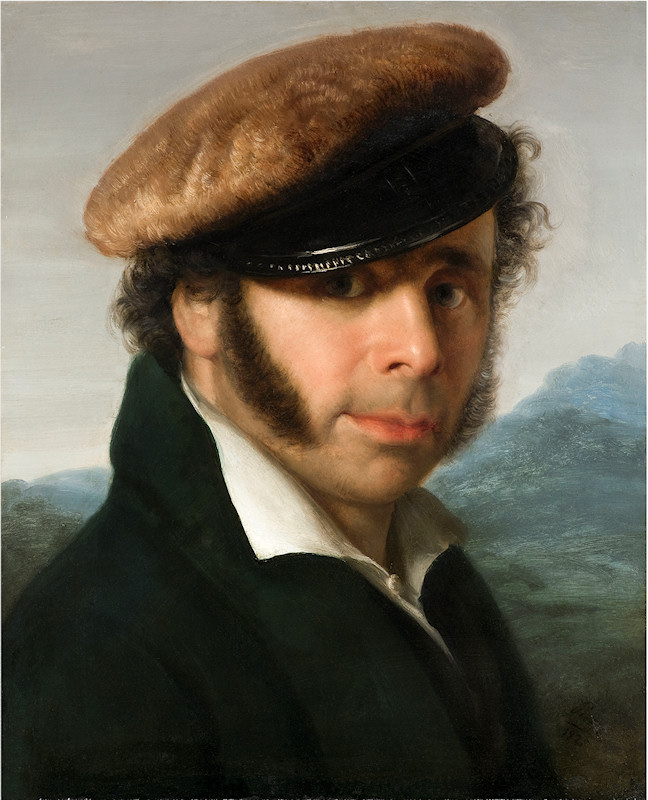
36. Giovanni Carnovali, Ritratto di Pietro Ronzoni, 1825

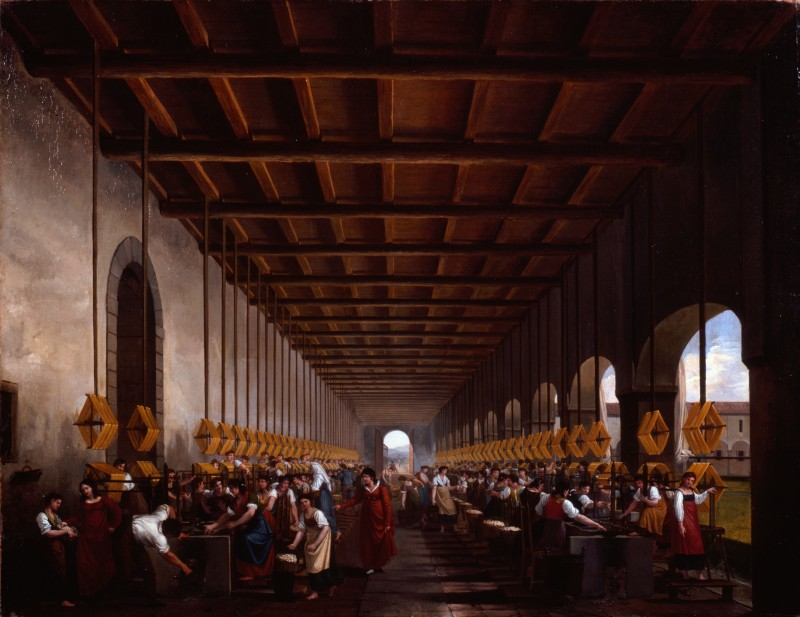
37. Pietro Ronzoni, Filanda nel bergamasco, 1825-1830

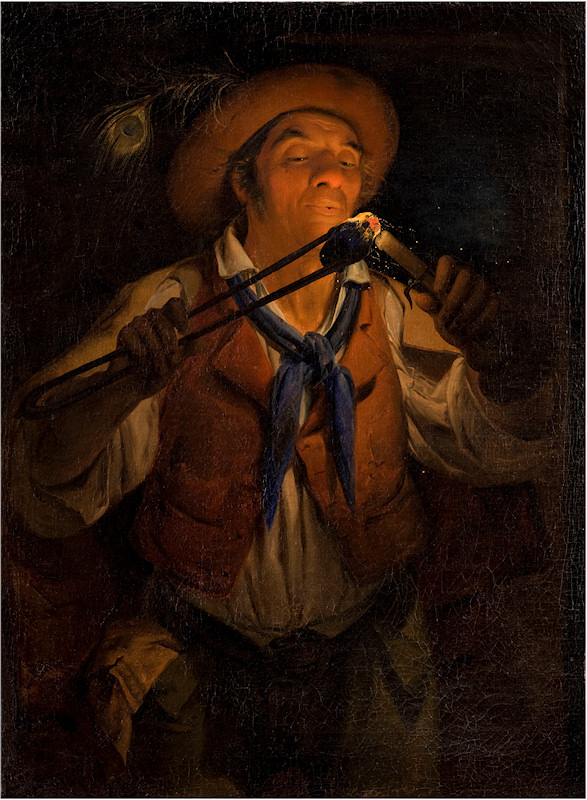
39. Angelo Inganni, Contadino che accende la candela con un tizzone ardente, 1850

==== Section IV: historic depictions of the Risorgimento ====
Gerolamo Induno, Sebastiano De Albertis and the Risorgimento (Rooms 8 and 9).

Artworks
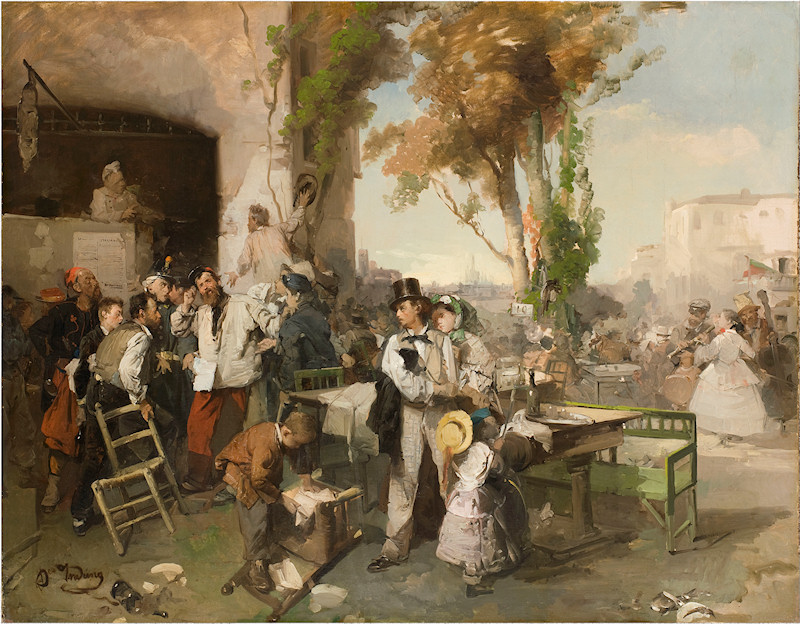
41. Domenico Induno, L'arrivo del Bollettino di Villafranca, 1861-1862

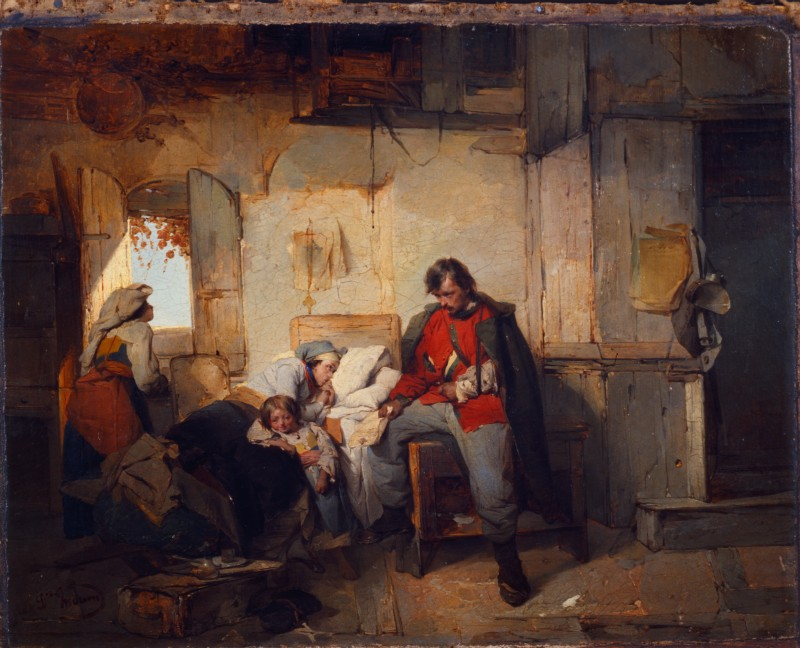
42. Domenico Induno, Il ritorno del soldato ferito, 1854 ca

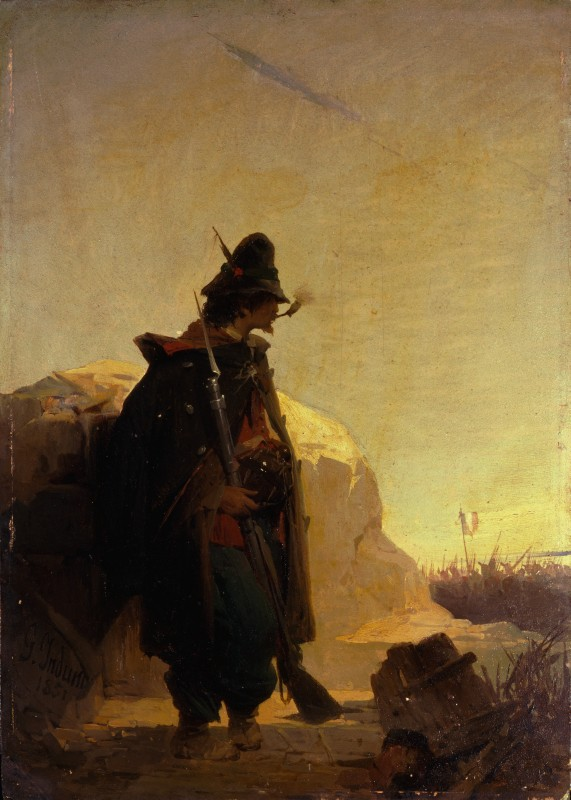
43. Gerolamo Induno, Sentinella, 1851

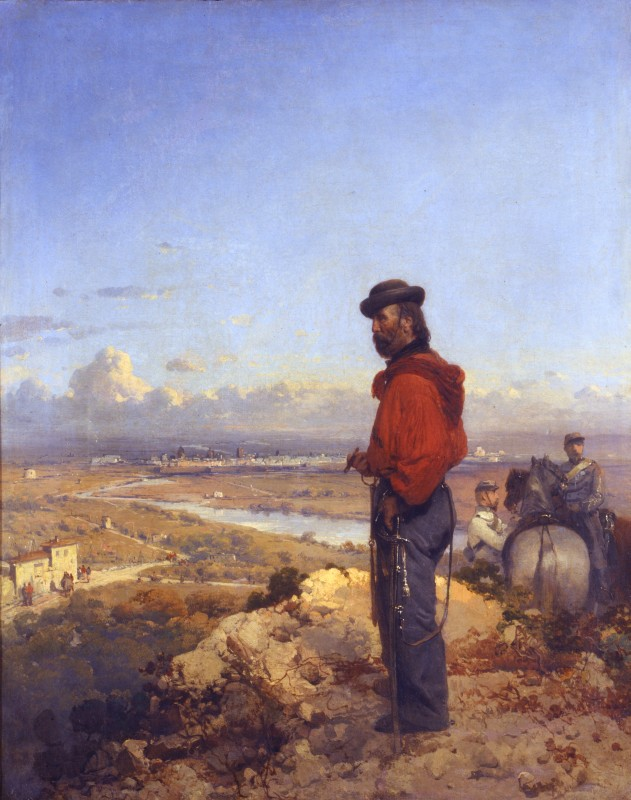
44. Gerolamo Induno, Garibaldi sulle alture di Sant'Angelo presso Capua, 1862

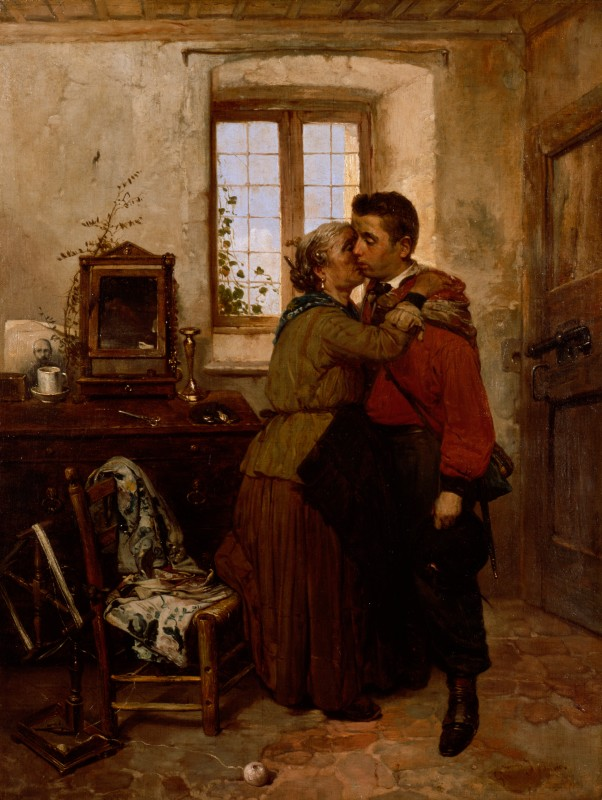
45. Gerolamo Induno, La partenza del garibaldino, 1860

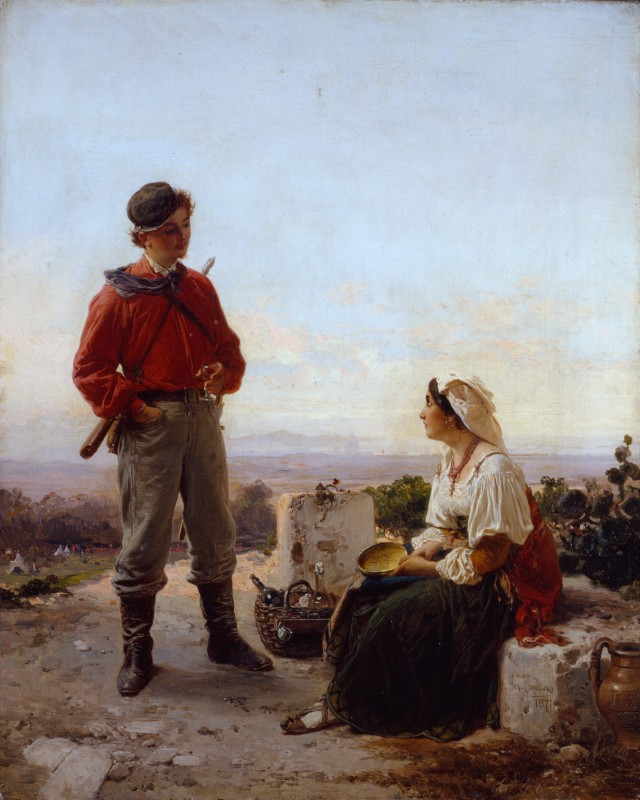
46. Gerolamo Induno, Il garibaldino, 1871

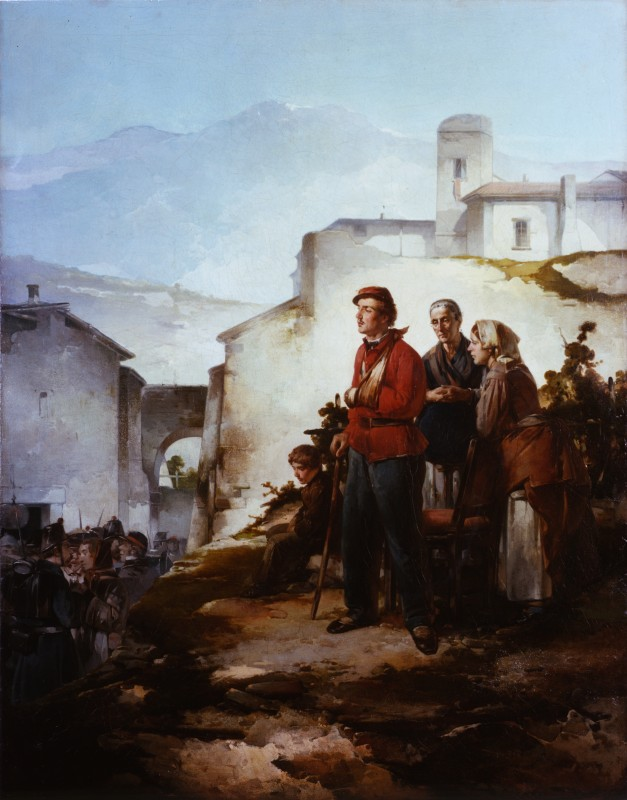
47. Angelo Trezzini, Il soldato ferito, 1860-1870

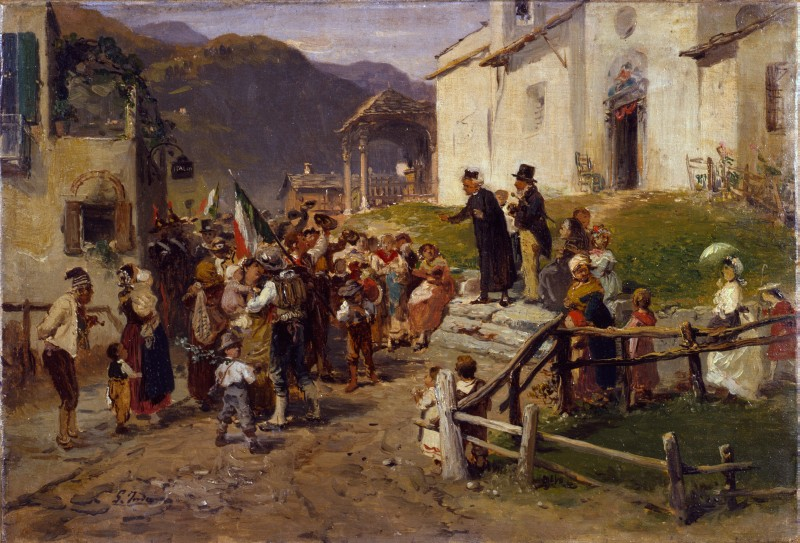
48. Gerolamo Induno, La partenza dei volontari nel 1866, 1877-1878

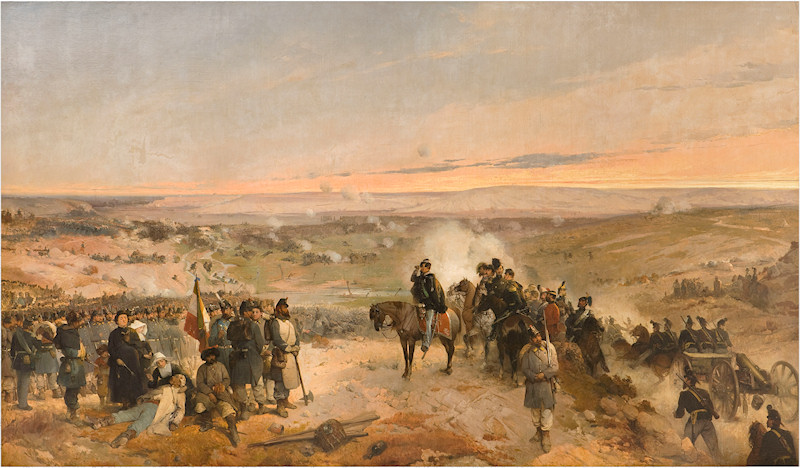
49. Gerolamo Induno, The Battle of the Chernaya, 1857

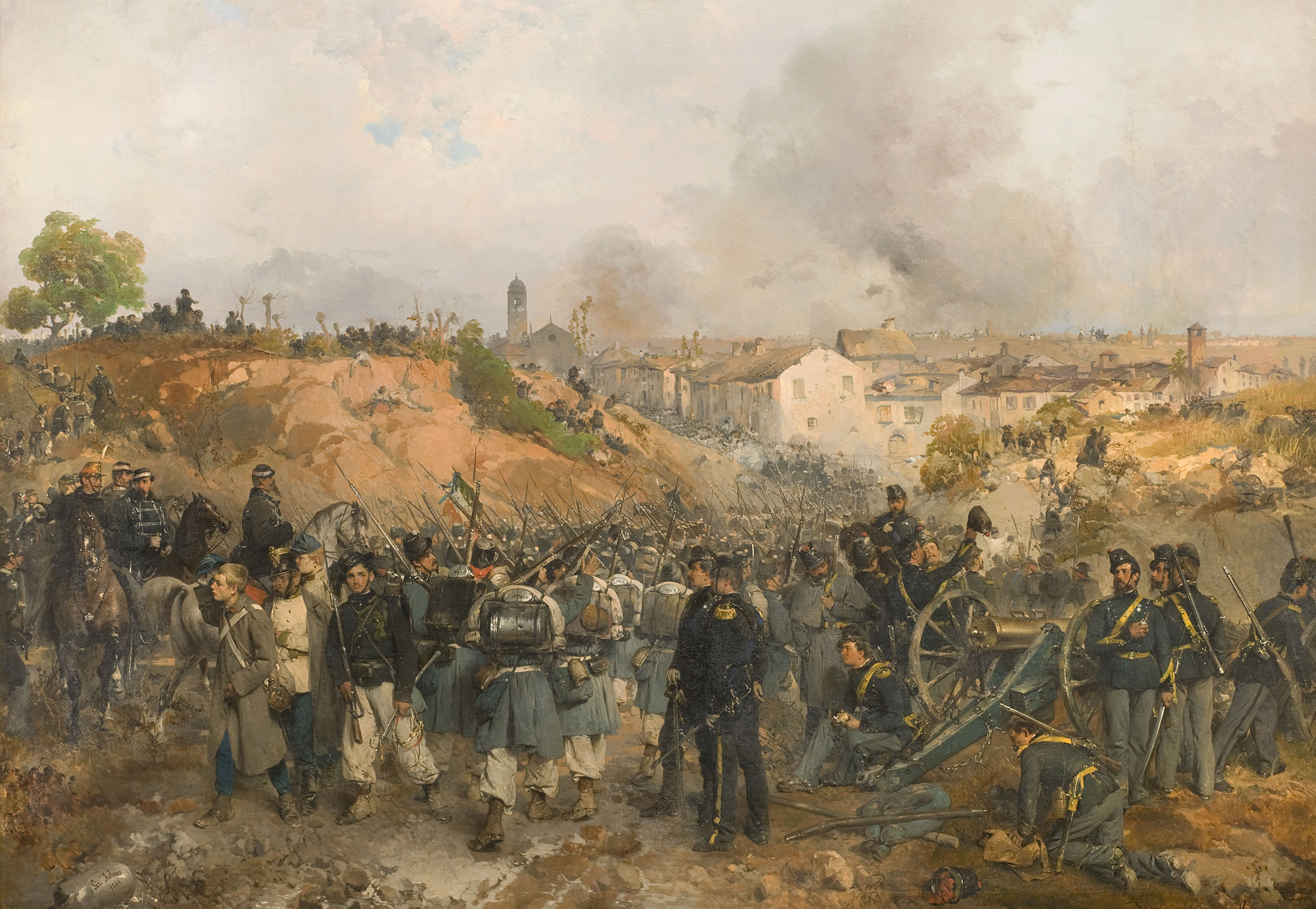
50. Gerolamo Induno, La presa di Palestro del 30 maggio 1859, 1860

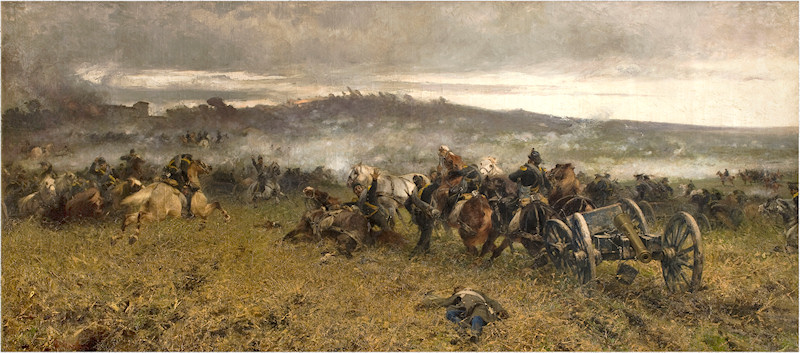
51. Sebastiano De Albertis, L'artiglieria della III Divisione alla battaglia di San Martino, 1887

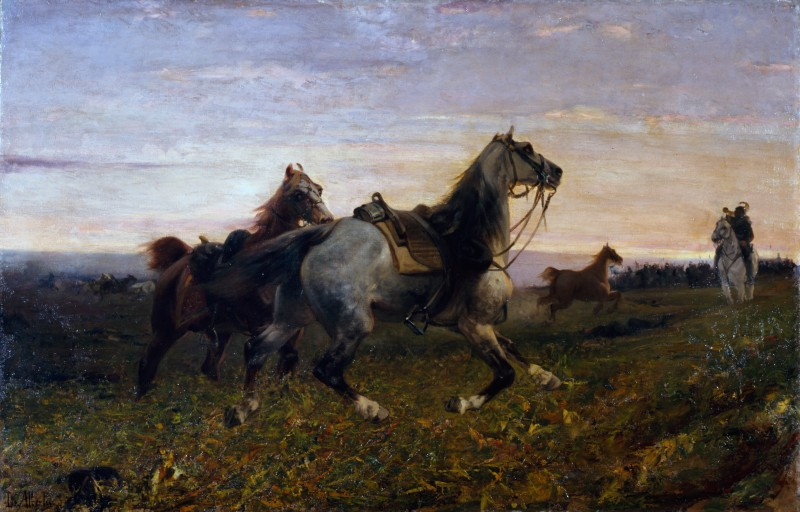
52. Sebastiano De Albertis, Il richiamo dei cavalli sbandati, 1893

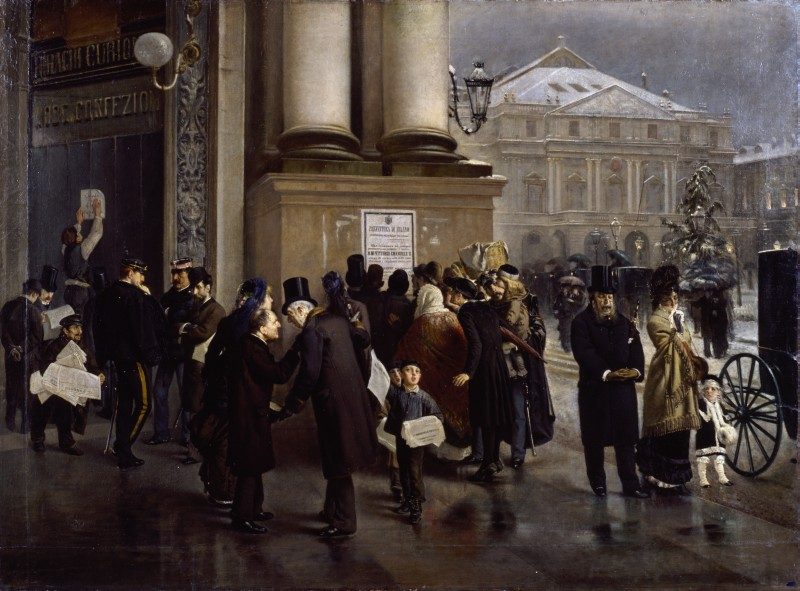
53. Emilio Magistretti, Il 9 gennaio 1878 a Milano. Annuncio della morte di Vittorio Emanuele II, 1879

==== Section V: Vedute of the Cathedral of Milan ====
The image of Milan in the view and perspective of painting. The cathedral (Rooms 10, 11, 12 and 13).

Artworks
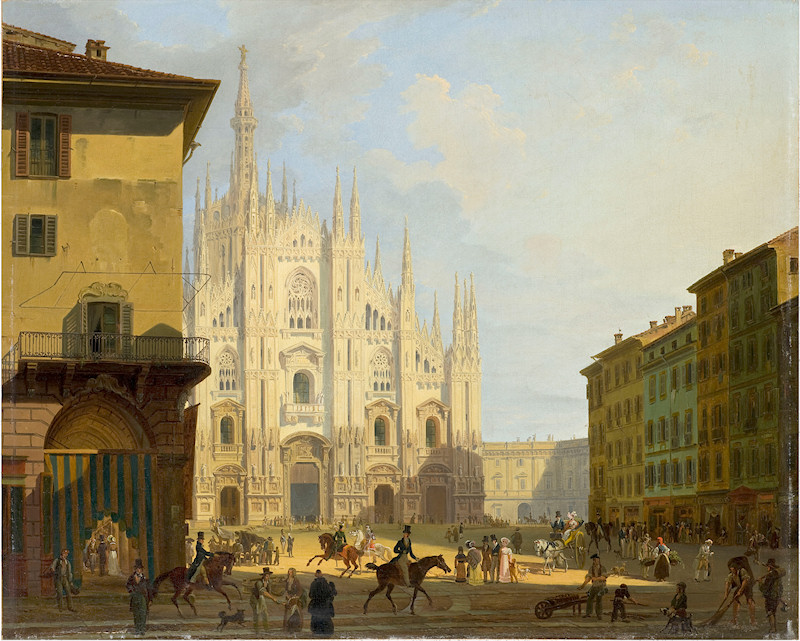
54. Giovanni Migliara, Veduta di piazza del Duomo in Milano, 1819

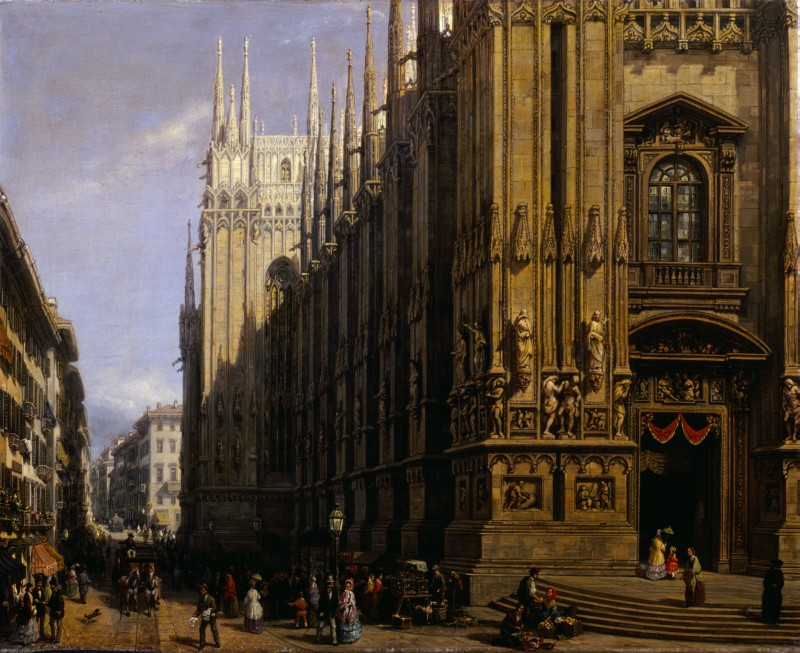
56. Carlo Canella, Il Duomo di Milano e la corsia dei Servi, 1860-1865

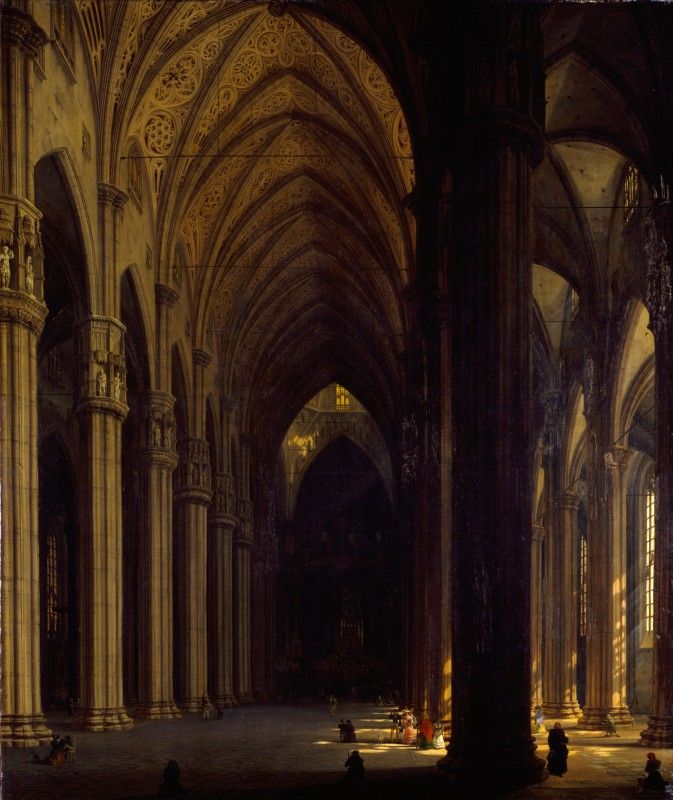
58. Pompeo Calvi, Interno del Duomo di Milano, 1835

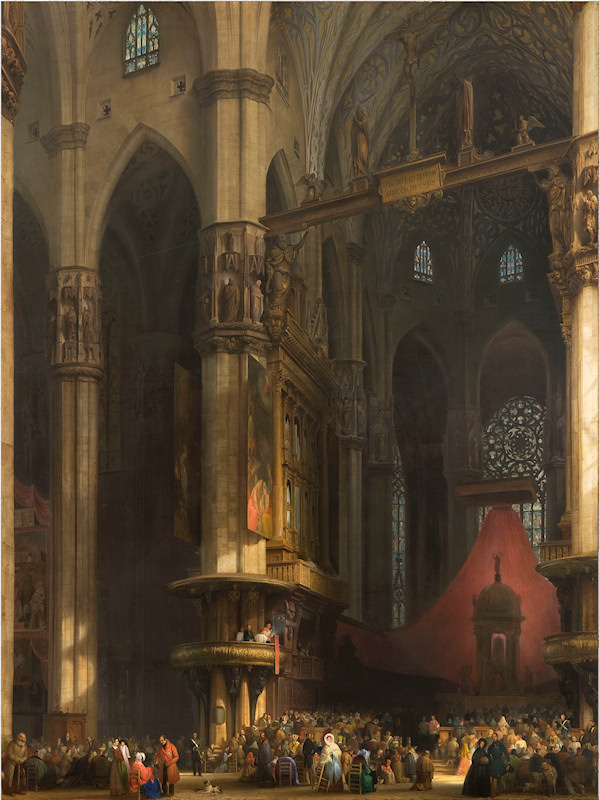
59. Luigi Bisi, Interno del Duomo di Milano, 1840

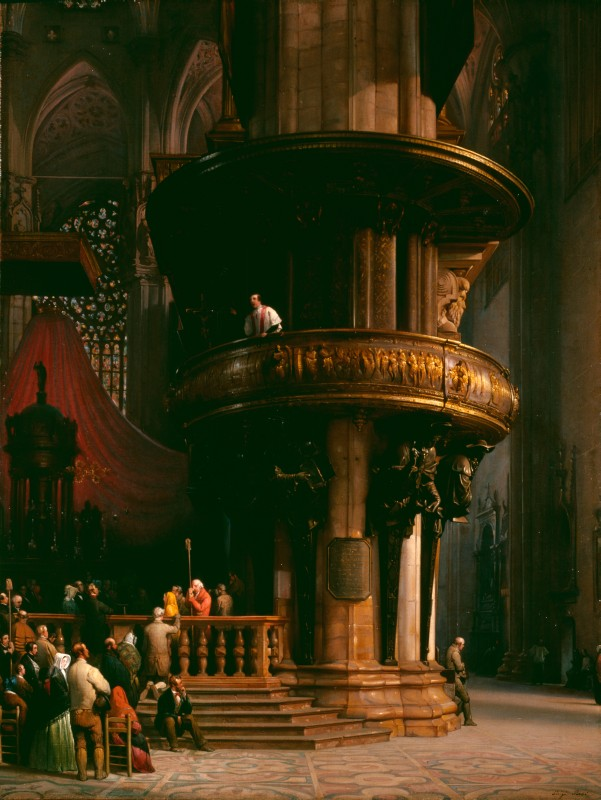
60. Luigi Bisi, Predica nel Duomo di Milano, 1850

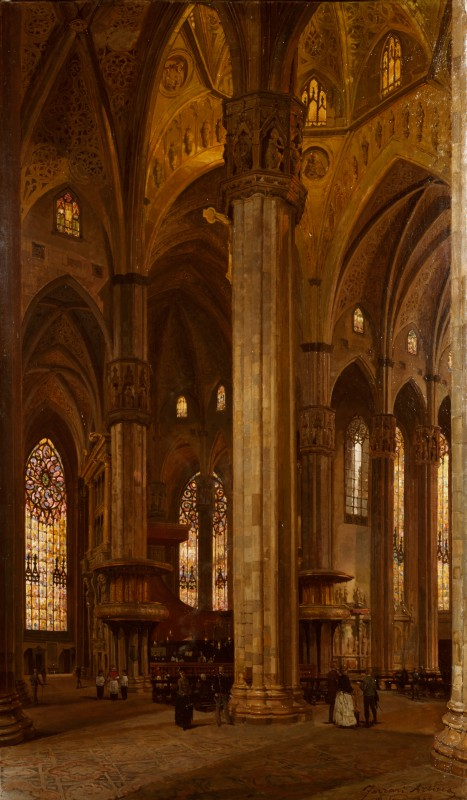
63. Arturo Ferrari, Interno del Duomo di Milano, 1888

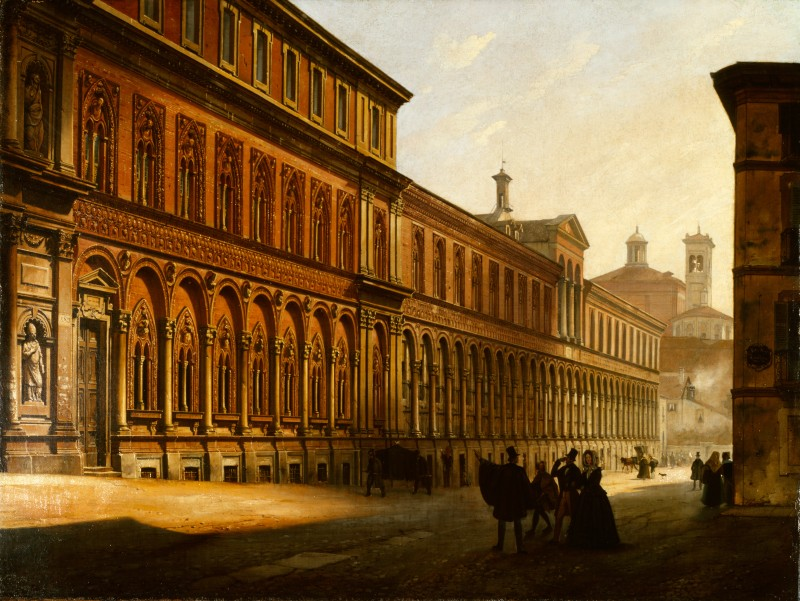
64. Luigi Premazzi, Veduta dell'Ospedale Maggiore di Milano, 1842

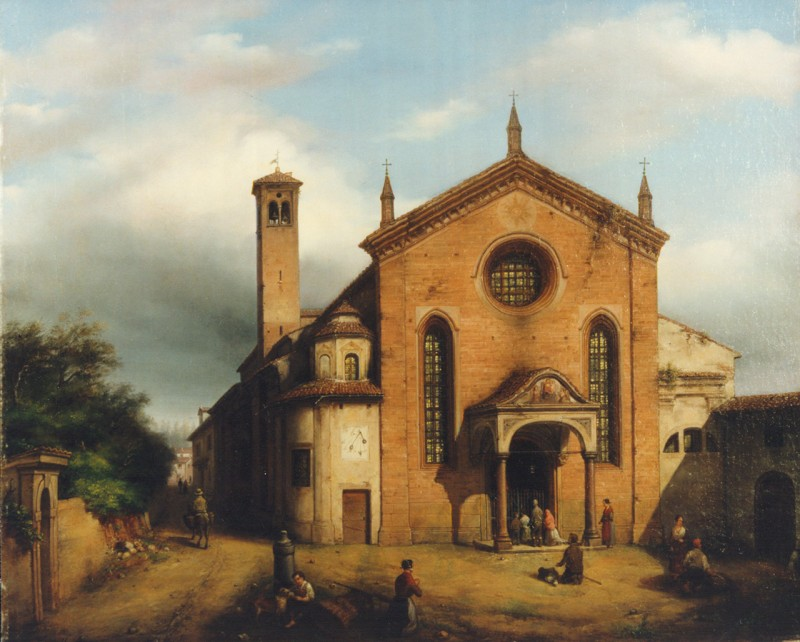
65. Carlo Canella, Veduta della chiesa di Santa Maria della Pace in Milano, 1852-1855

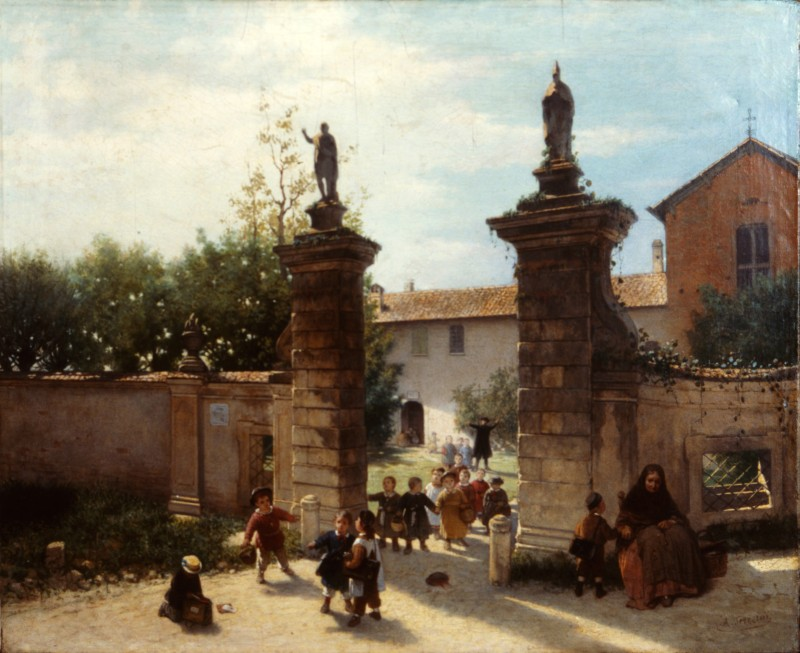
66. Angelo Trezzini, La passeggiata del giovedì (Il Fopponino), 1869

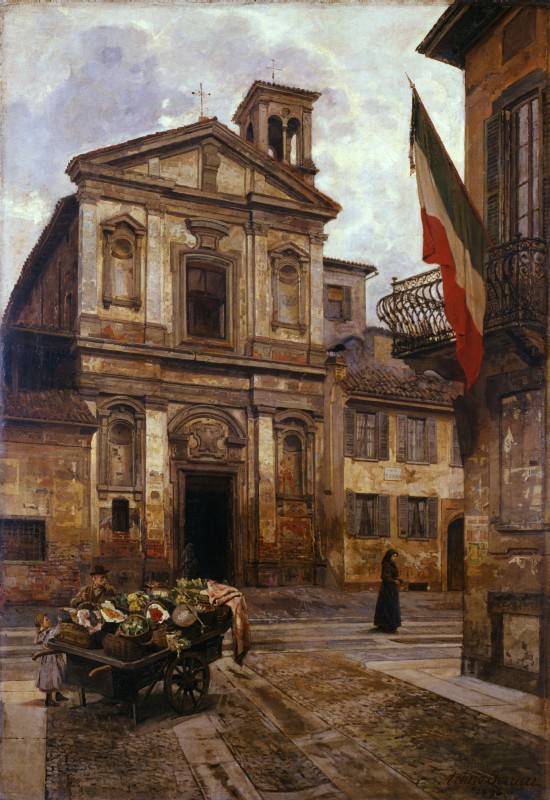
69. Arturo Ferrari, La chiesa di Santo Stefano in Borgogna, 1896

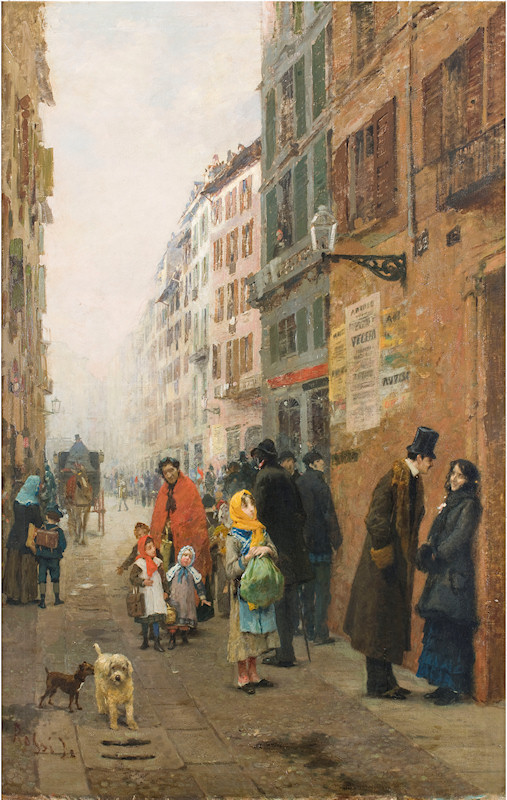
71. Luigi Rossi, Una via di Milano, 1881

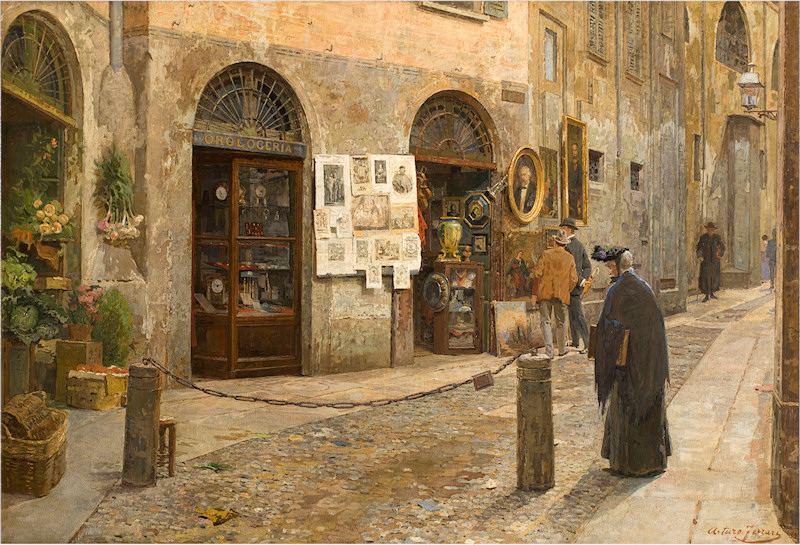
72. Arturo Ferrari, Nella vecchia via (Il vicolo di San Bernardino alle ossa a Milano), 1912

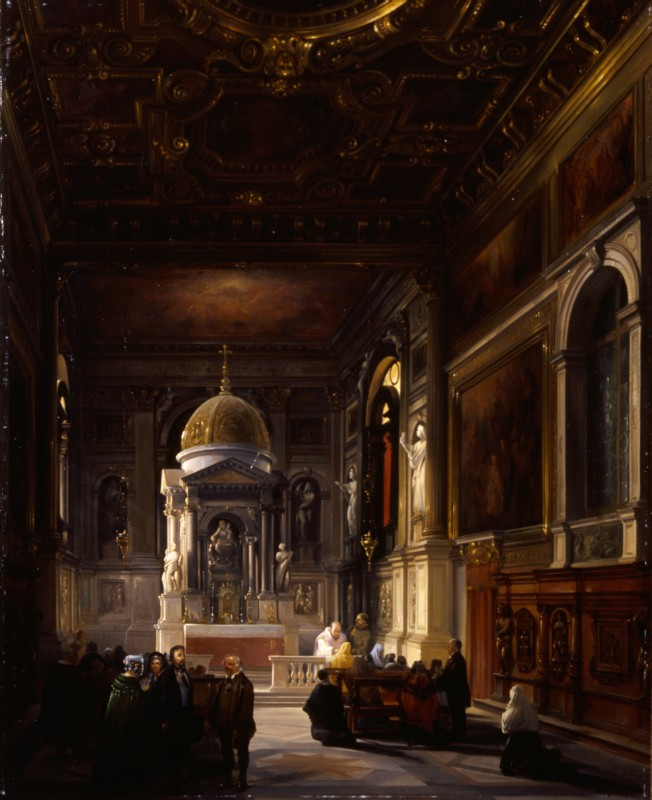
74. Federico Moja, Interno della cappella del Rosario nella chiesa dei Santi Giovanni e Paolo a Venezia, 1843

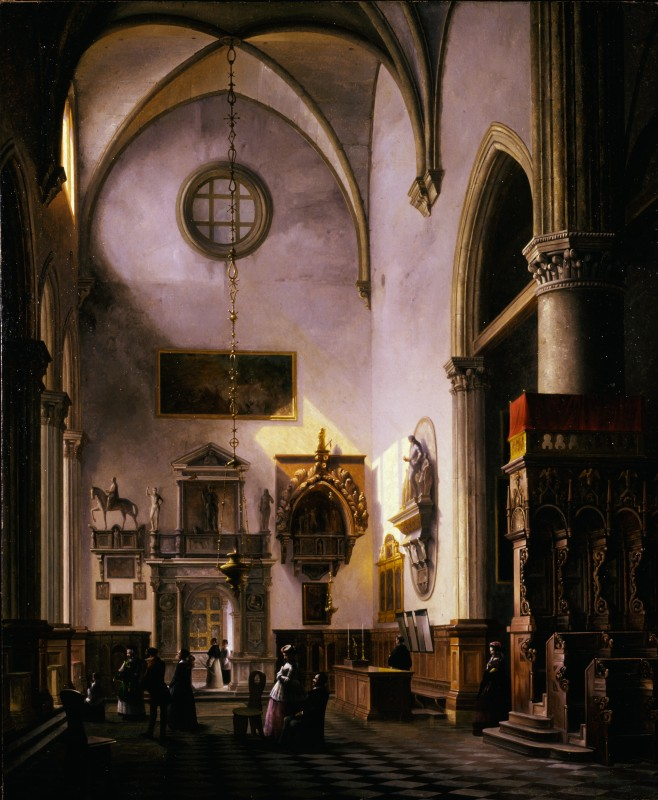
75. Vincenzo Abbati, Veduta del monumento sepolcrale a Paolo Savelli nella chiesa di Santa Maria Gloriosa dei Frari a Venezia, 1857

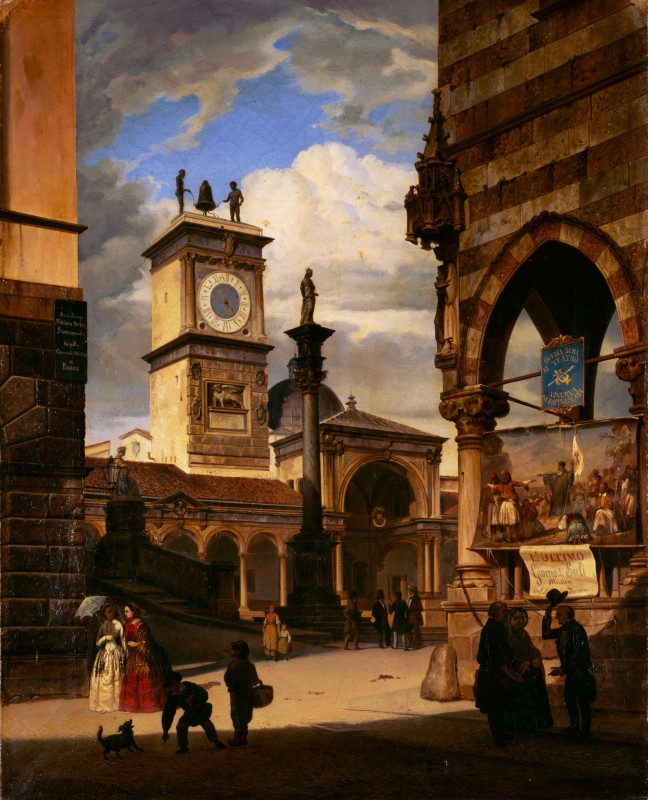
77. Fausto Antonioli, Veduta della piazza Contarena di Udine, 1856

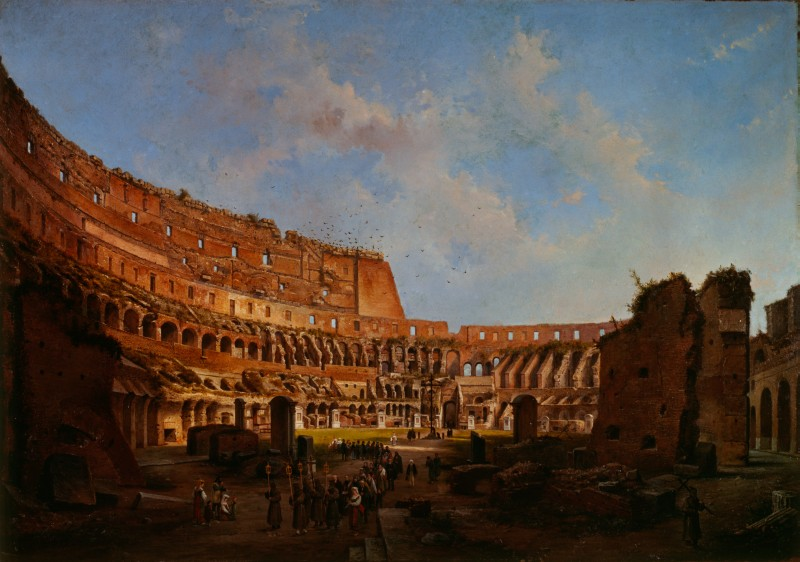
78. Luigi Querena, Processione all'interno del Colosseo, 1870

==== Section VI: Vedute of Navigli ====
The image of Milan. The popular appeal of the Navigli (Room 14).

Artworks
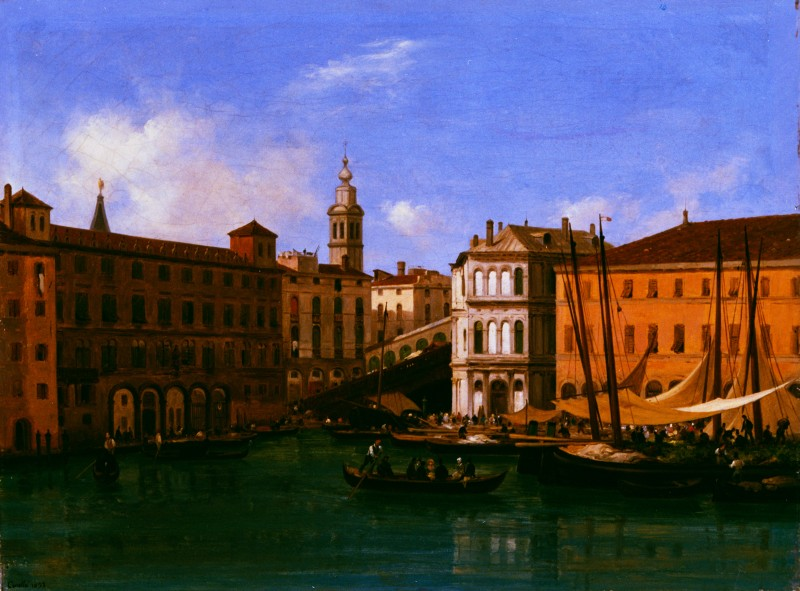
80. Giuseppe Canella, Barconi a Rialto, 1833

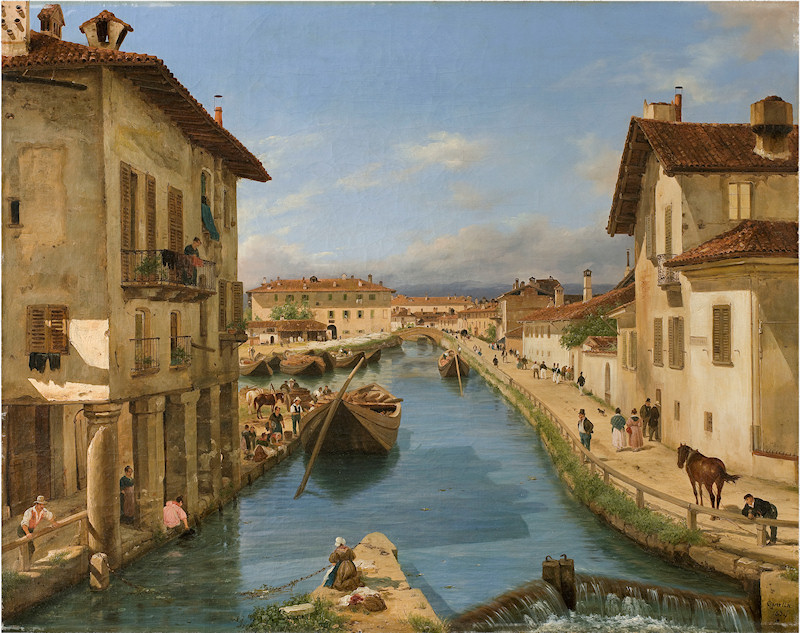
81. Giuseppe Canella, Veduta del canale Naviglio presa sul ponte di San Marco, 1834

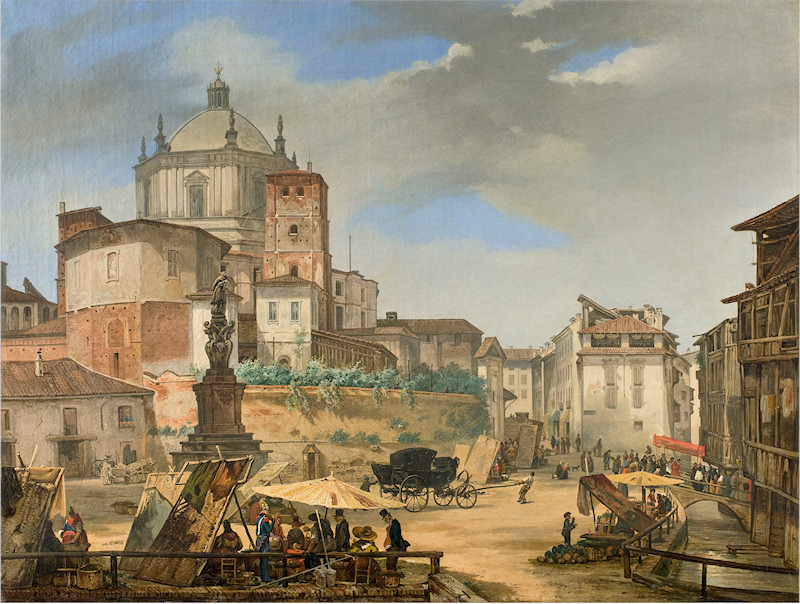
87. Giuseppe Elena, Veduta della piazza della Vetra in Milano, 1833

==== Section VII: Lombard Vedute ====
The Lombard landscape. Between the evocative poetry of Manzoni and the quest for truth. (Room 15).

Artworks
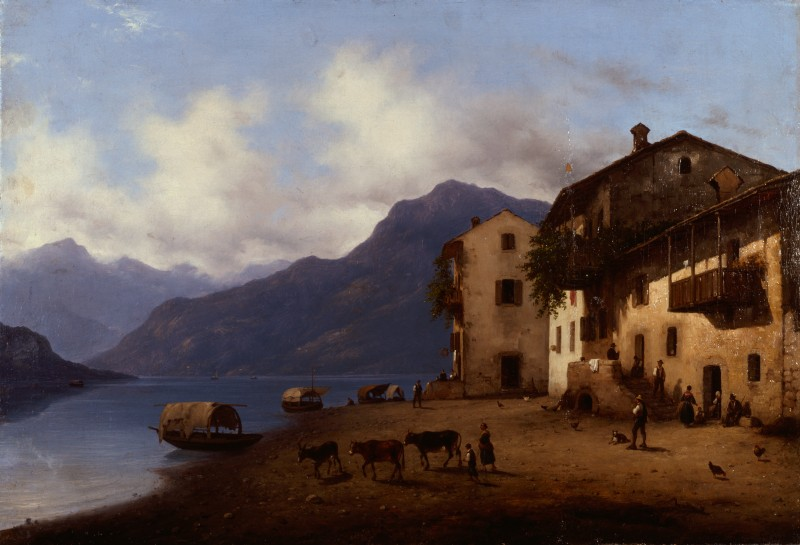
93. Giuseppe Canella, Veduta di Sala sul Lago di Como, 1847

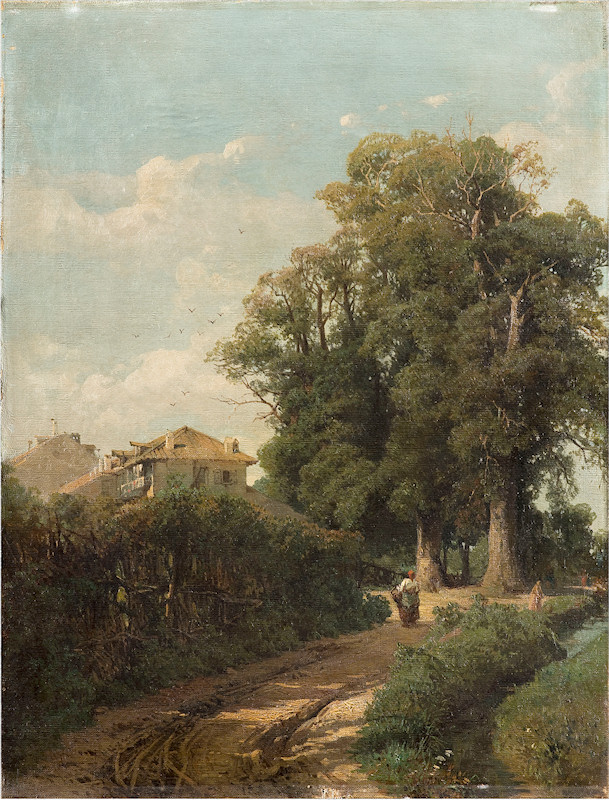
95. Eugenio Gignous, Dintorni di Milano (Lavandaie della Magolfa), 1870

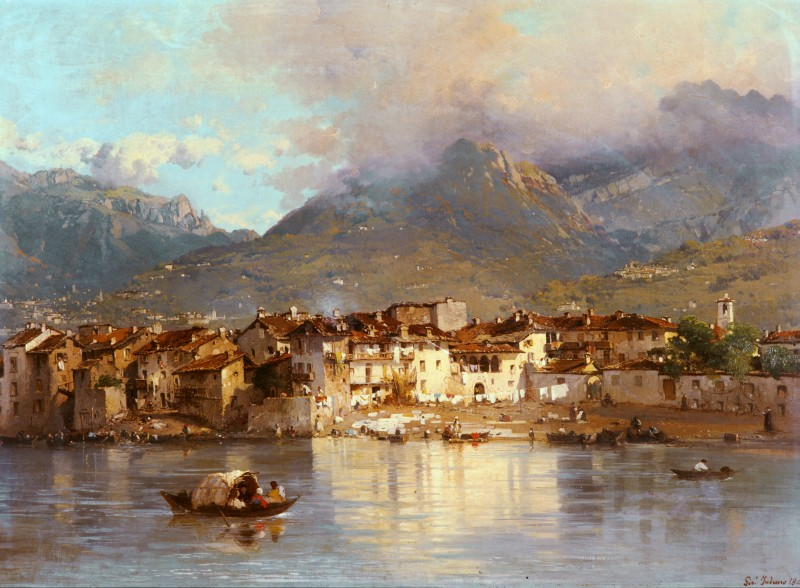
96. Gerolamo Induno, Pescarenico, 1862

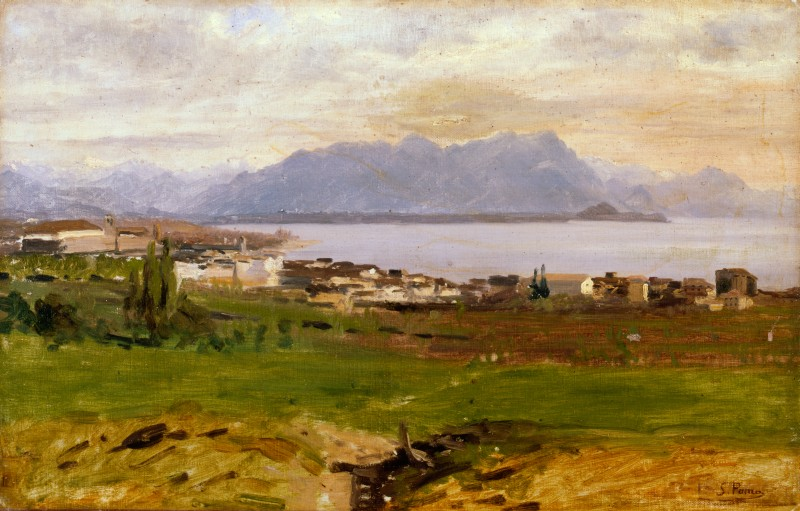
100. Silvio Poma, Veduta del Lago di Lecco e la punta di Bellagio, 1885-1890

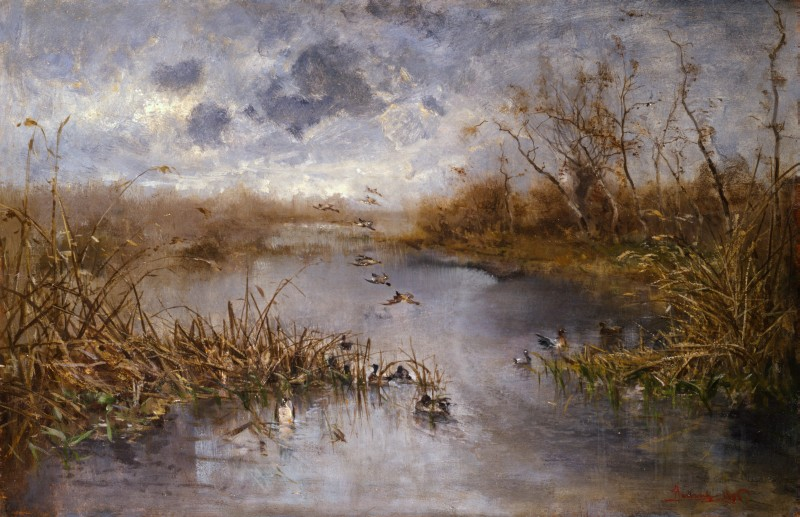
105. Pompeo Mariani, Cascina Zelata, 1896

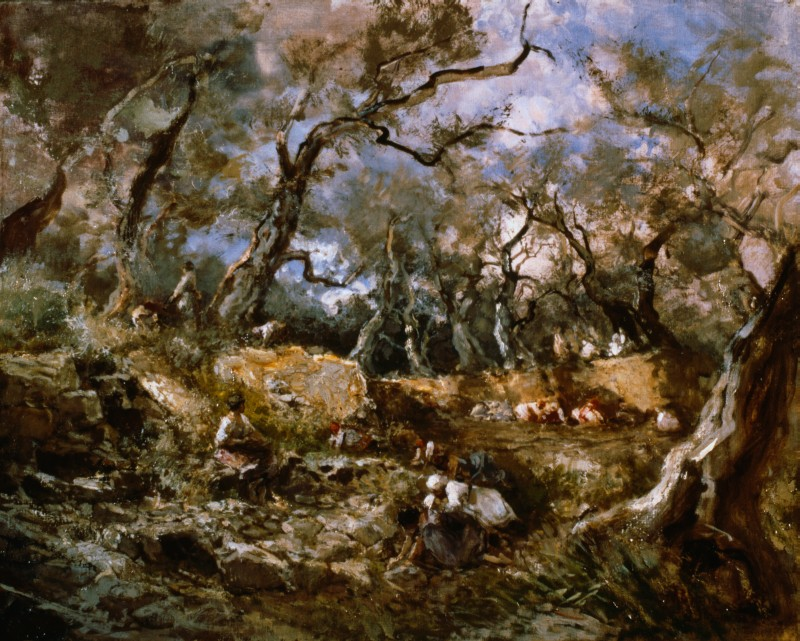
106. Pompeo Mariani, La raccolta delle olive a Bordighera, 1917

==== Section VIII: Revival of the Bourgeois Salon ====
The revival of the eighteenth century in the bourgeois salon (Room 16).

Artworks
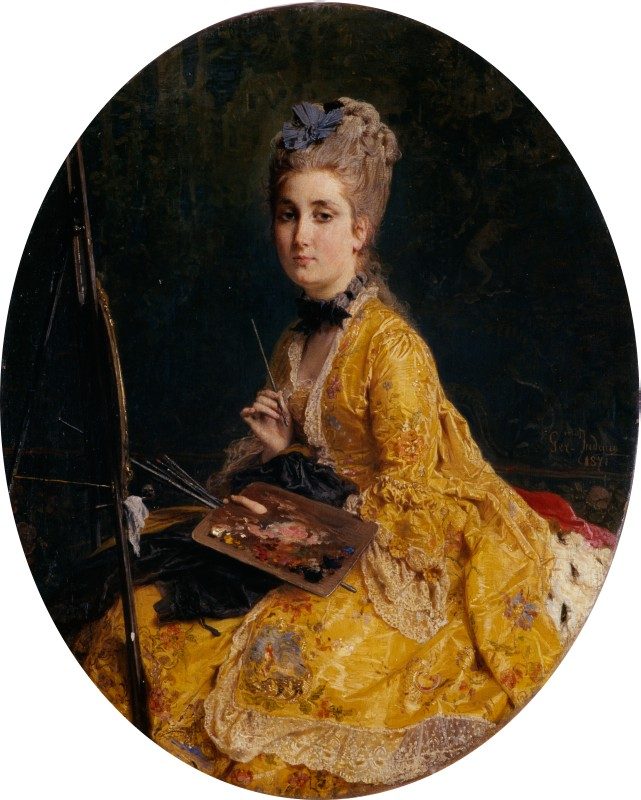
112. Gerolamo Induno, La pittrice, 1871

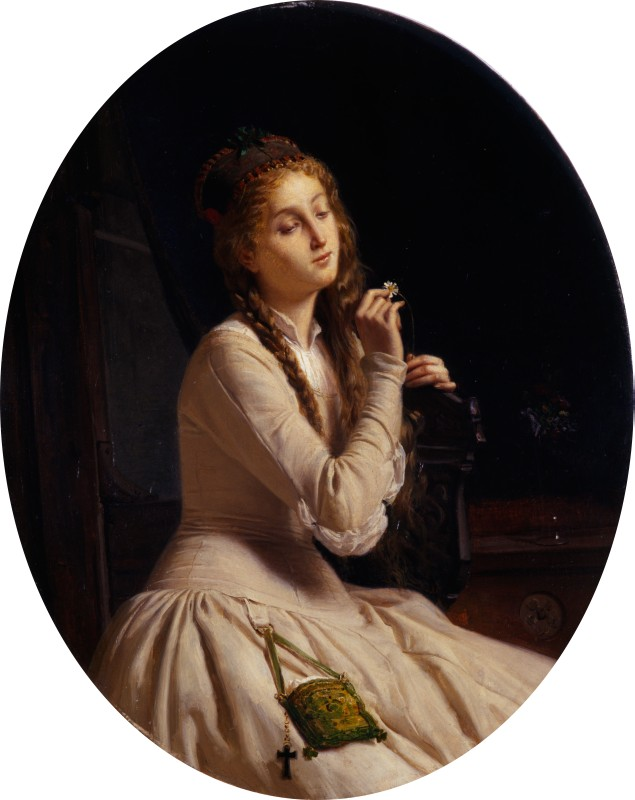
113. Francesco Valaperta, Mi ama o non mi ama? (La malata d'amore), 1871

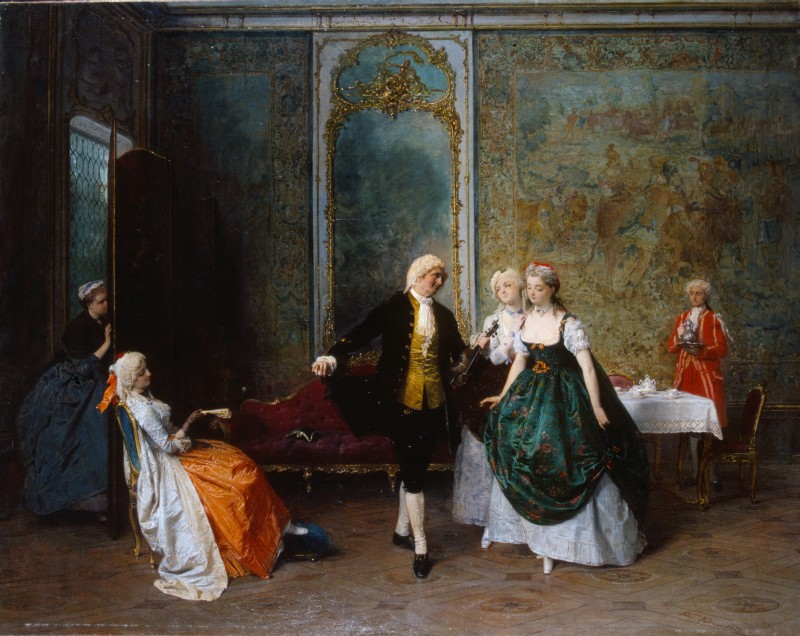
114. Gerolamo Induno, La lezione di ballo, 1867

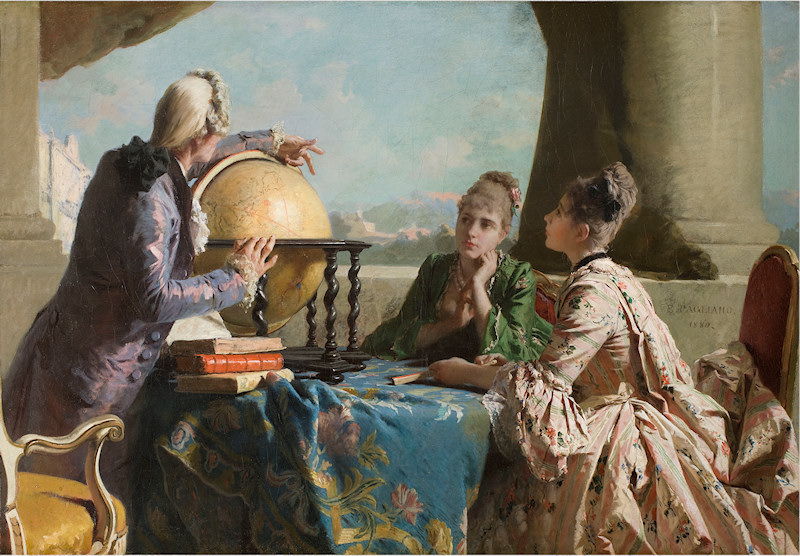
115. Eleuterio Pagliano, La lezione di geografia, 1880

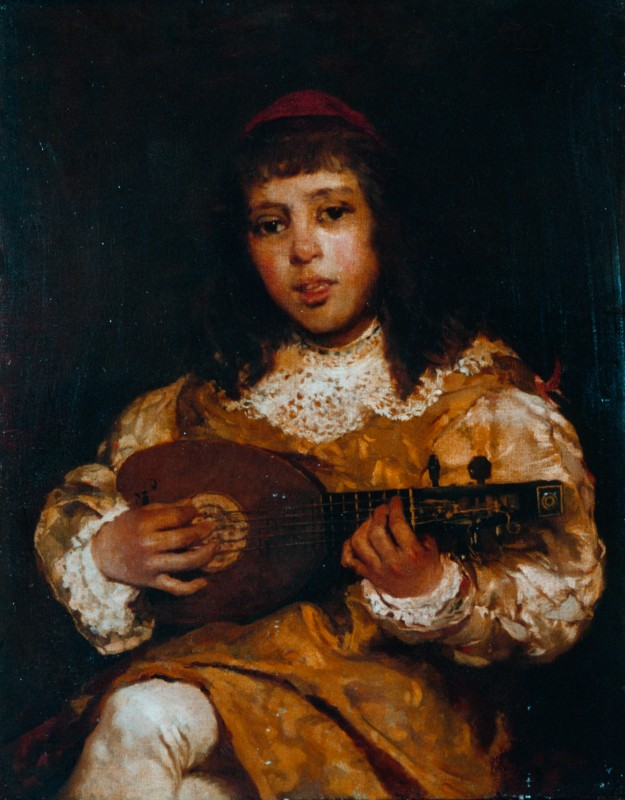
116. Gaetano Previati, Paggetto con mandolino, 1878-1884

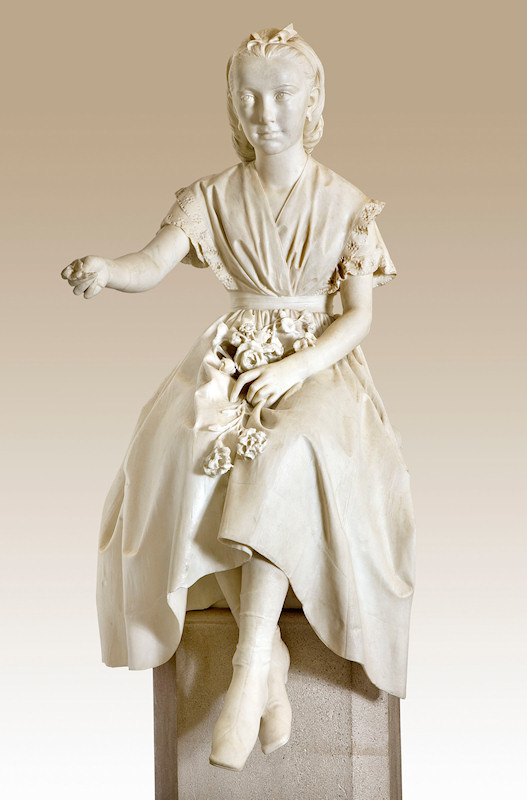
117. Vincenzo Vela, Ritratto della marchesa Virginia Busti Porro adolescente, 1871

==== Section IX: genre scenes ====
The genre painting. Scenes from the life of the people (Rooms 17 and 18).

Artworks
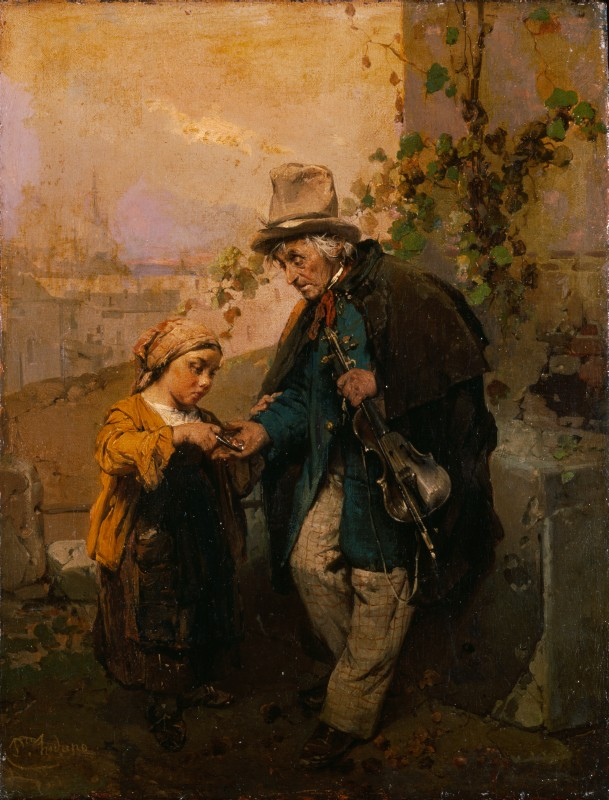
120. Domenico Induno, L'artista nomade (La questua), 1870-1872

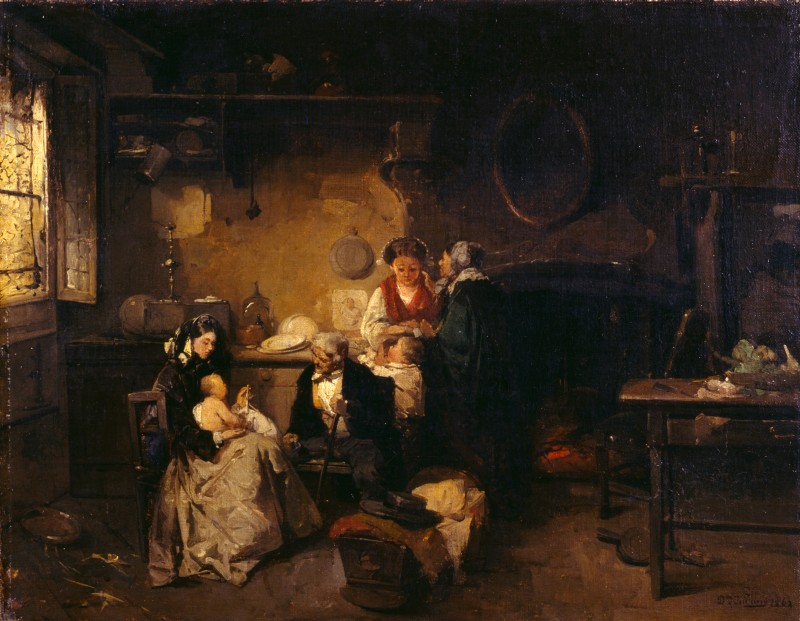
124. Domenico Induno, La visita alla nutrice, 1863

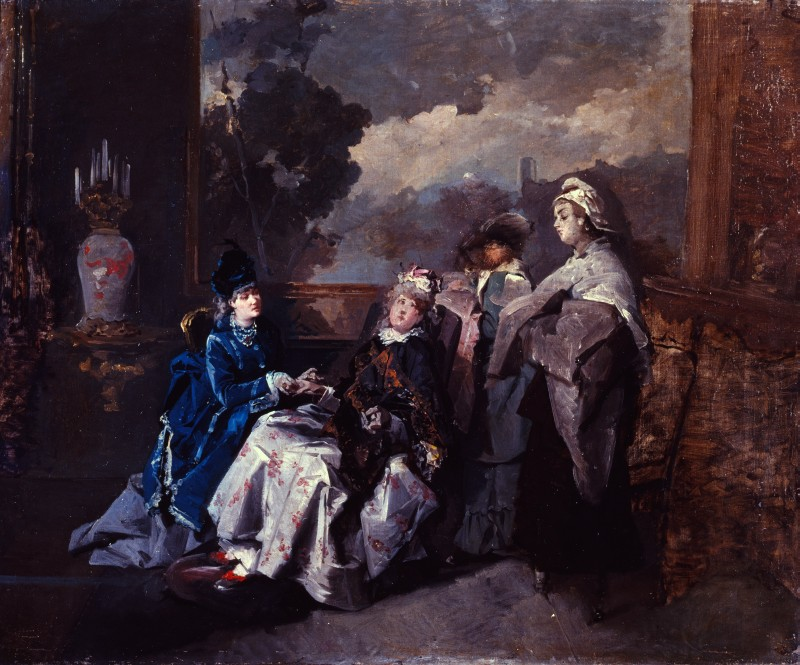
125. Domenico Induno, La visita alla puerpera, 1875 ca

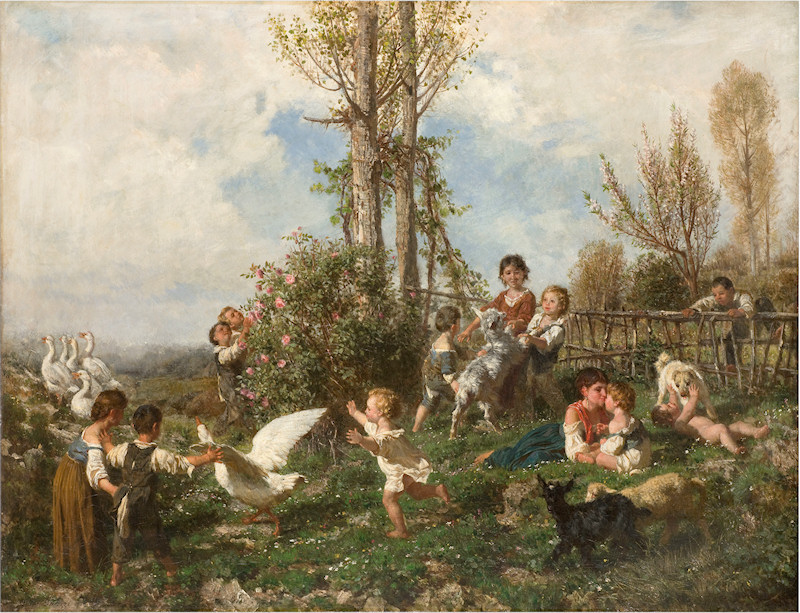
128. Filippo Palizzi, La primavera, 1868

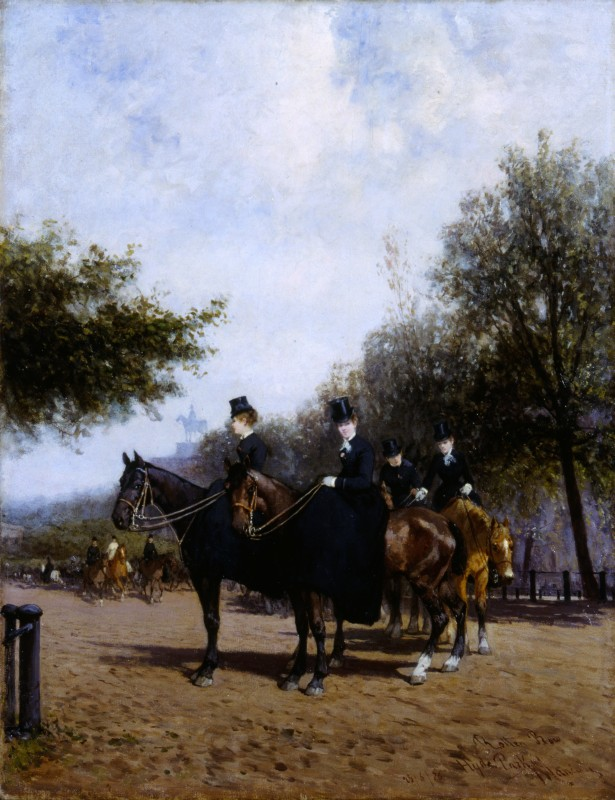
129. Francesco Mancini (1830-1905), Rotten Row, Hyde Park, 1876

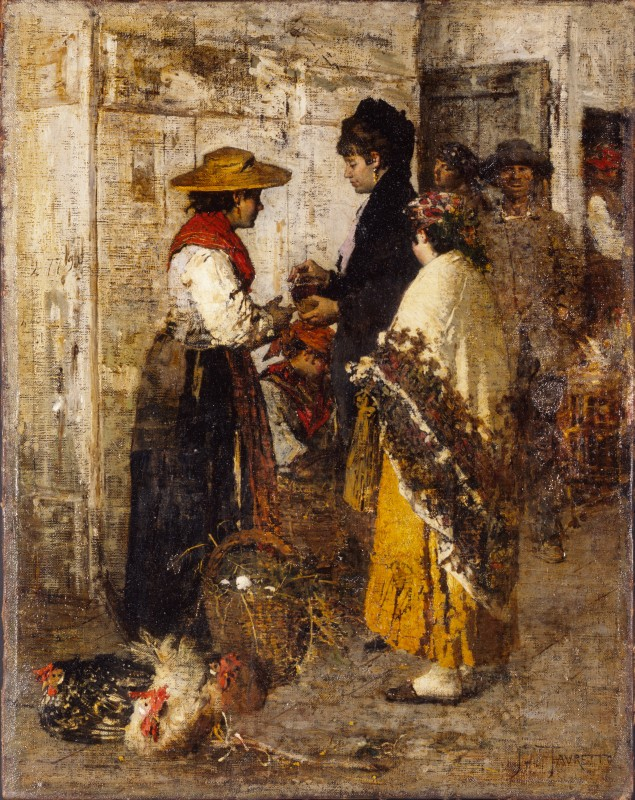
131. Giacomo Favretto, La pollivendola, 1880 ca

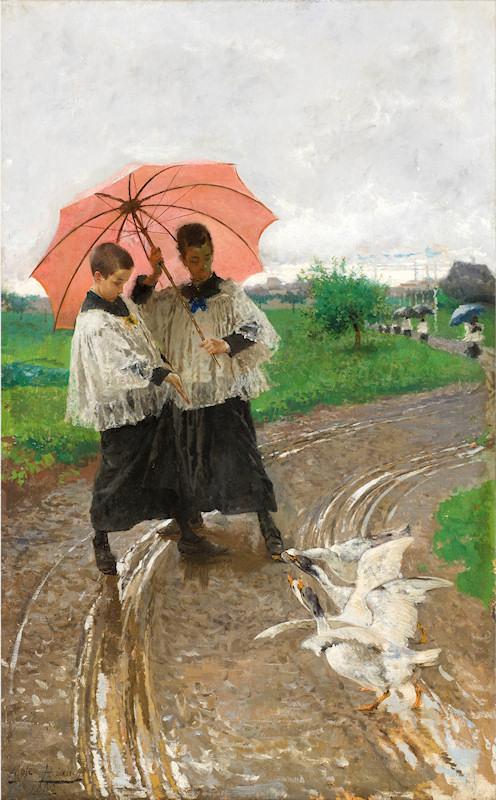
133. Mosè Bianchi, Il ritorno dalla sagra, 1880

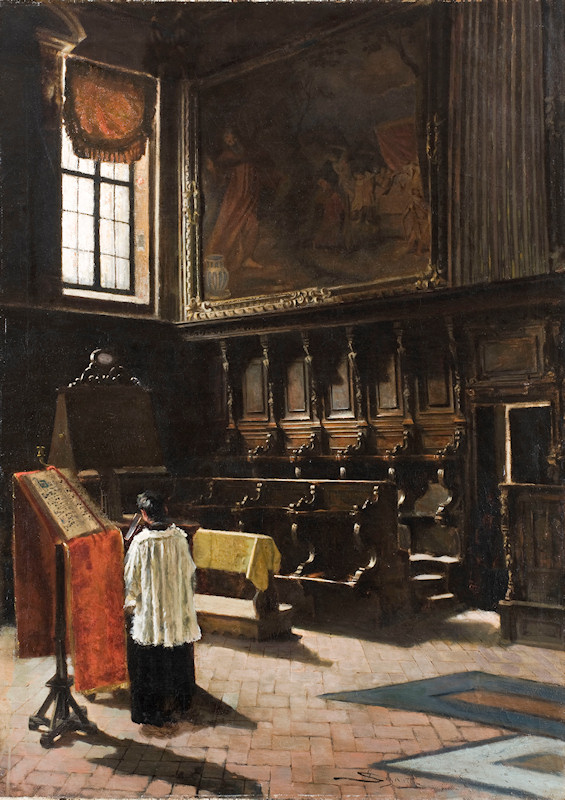
134. Giovanni Segantini, Il coro della chiesa di Sant'Antonio in Milano, 1879

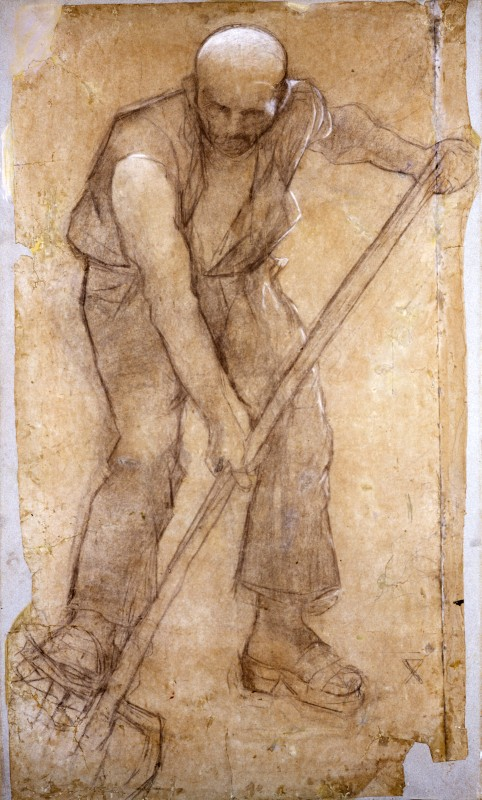
136. Giovanni Segantini, Il lavoratore della terra, 1886

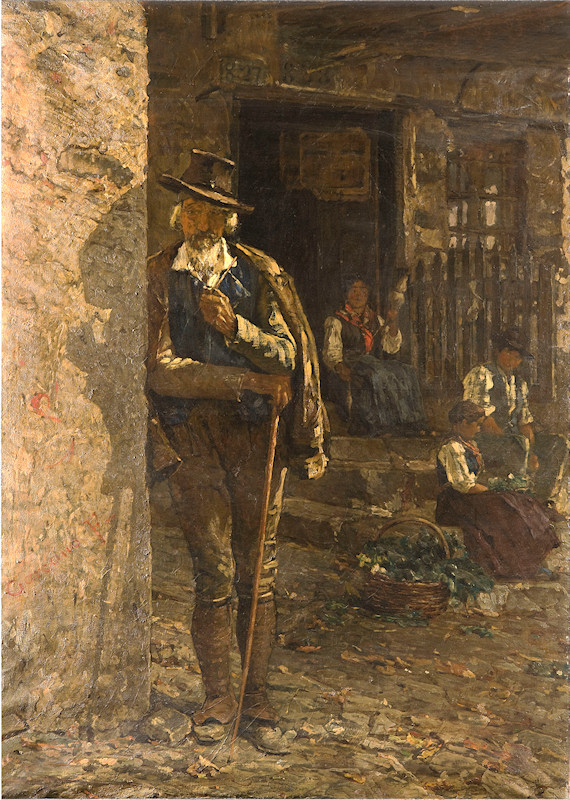
137. Filippo Carcano, Tipi di una famiglia di contadini nel Veneto, 1885

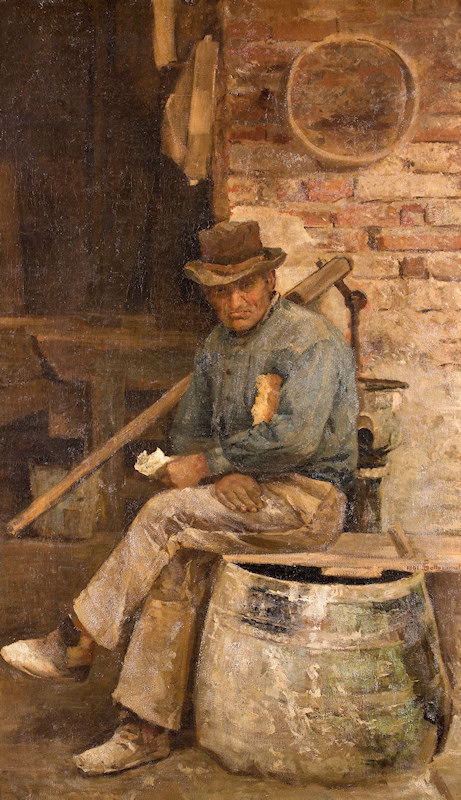
138. Giovanni Sottocornola, Muratore, 1891

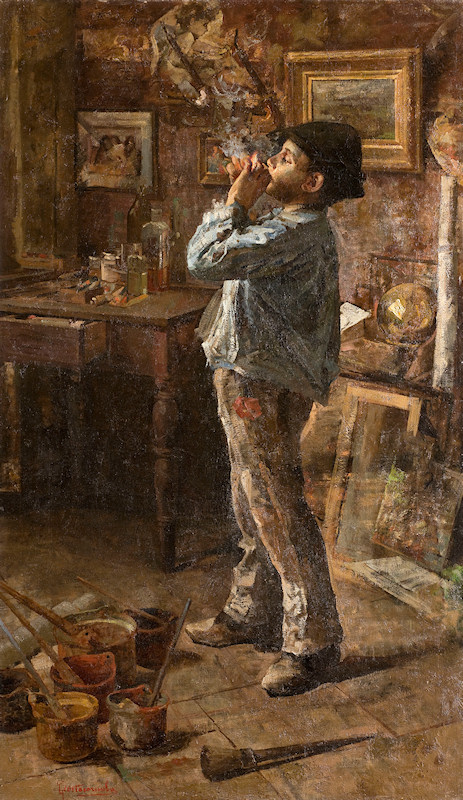
139. Giovanni Sottocornola, Anch'io pittore (Dilettante), 1885

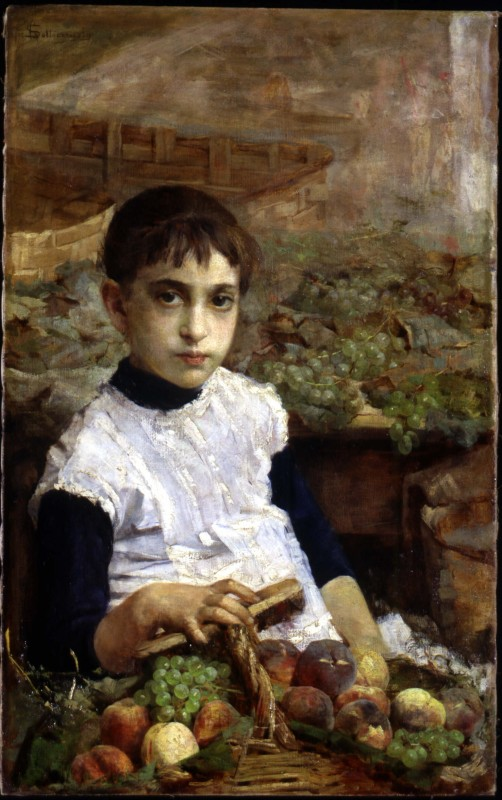
140. Giovanni Sottocornola, Frutera (Venditrice di frutta), 1886

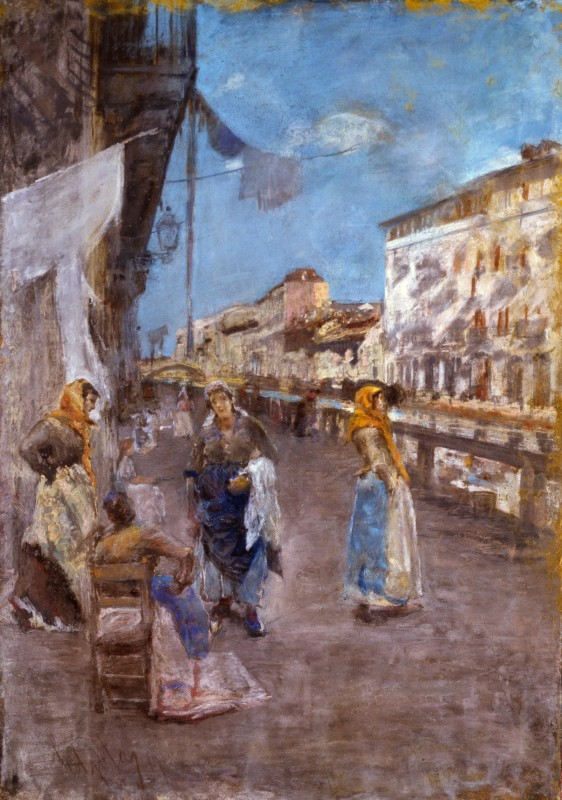
141. Emilio Gola, Lavandaie sul Naviglio, 1894-1899

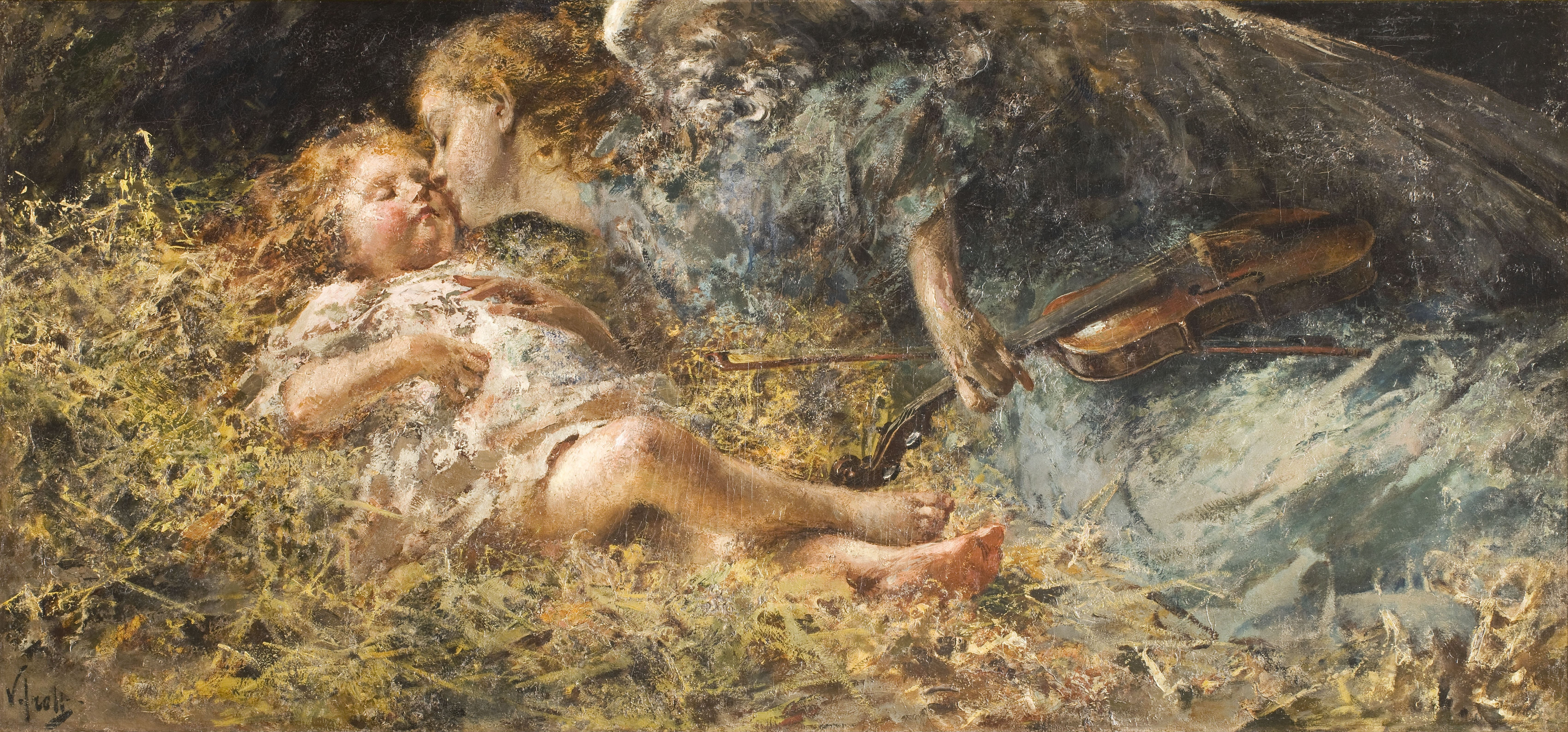
142. Vincenzo Irolli, L'angelo musicante, 1900-1905

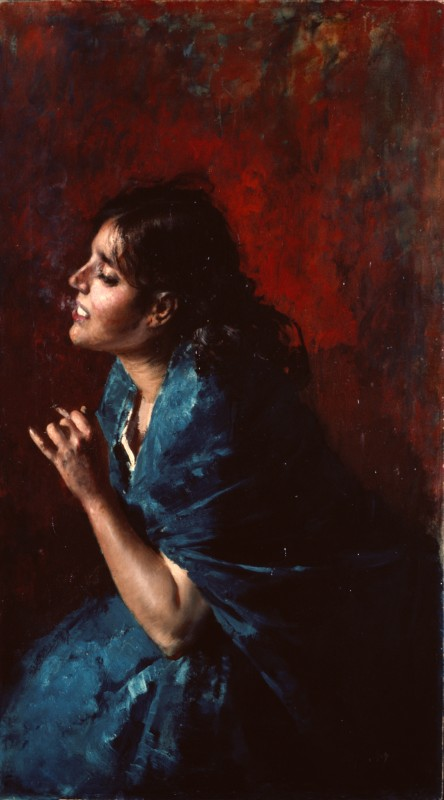
144. Vincenzo Irolli, Voluttà, 1900- 1910

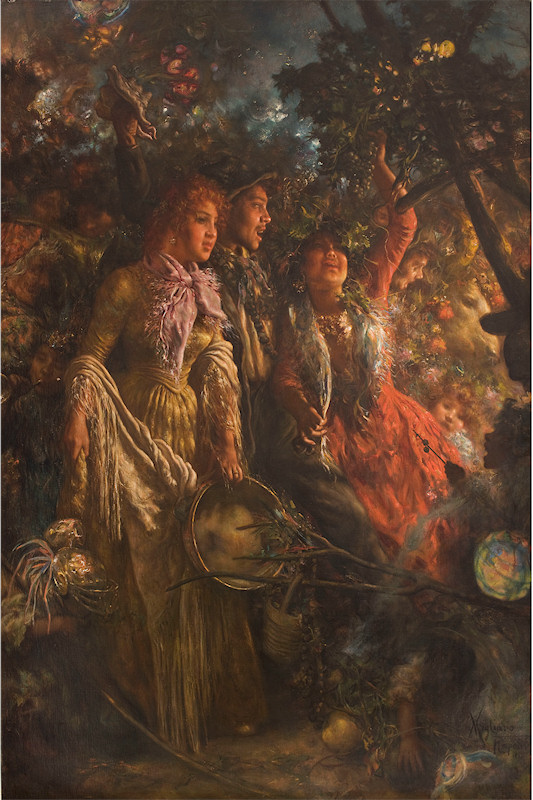
145. Vincenzo Migliaro, Piedigrotta (La festa di Piedigrotta), 1895

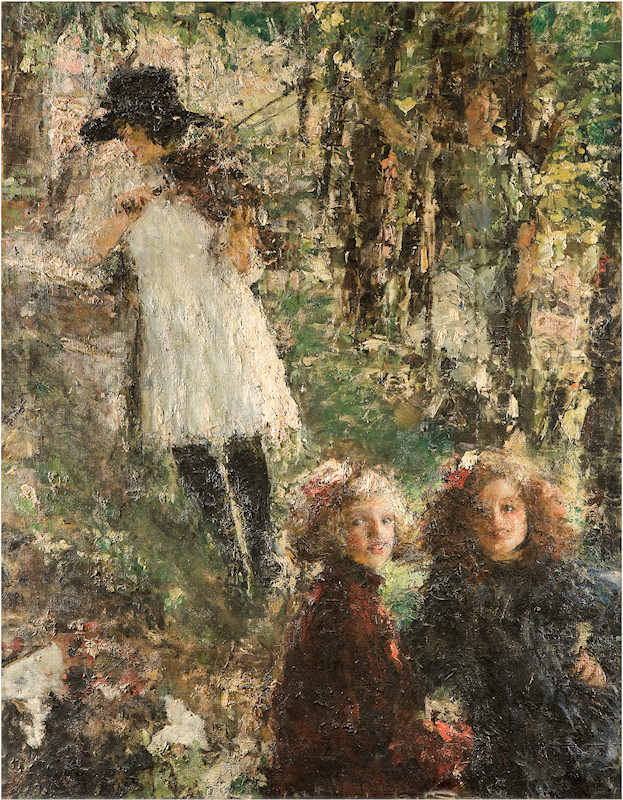
146. Antonio Mancini, Riflessi, 1918-1920

==== Section X: from the Macchiaioli to the Divisionists ====
From the Macchiaioli to the Divisionists. The atmospheric trial on the real (Room 18).

Artworks
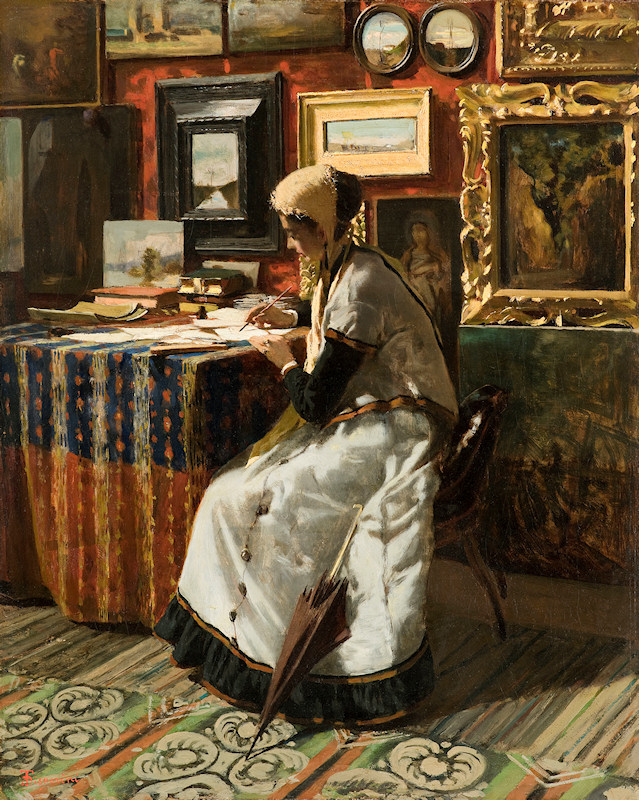
148. Telemaco Signorini, Non potendo aspettare, 1867

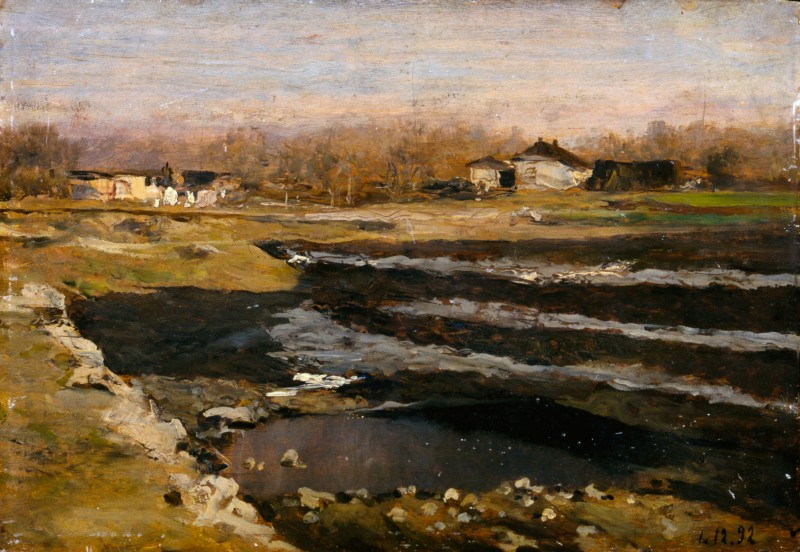
150. Lorenzo Delleani, Campagna verso l'inverno, 1892

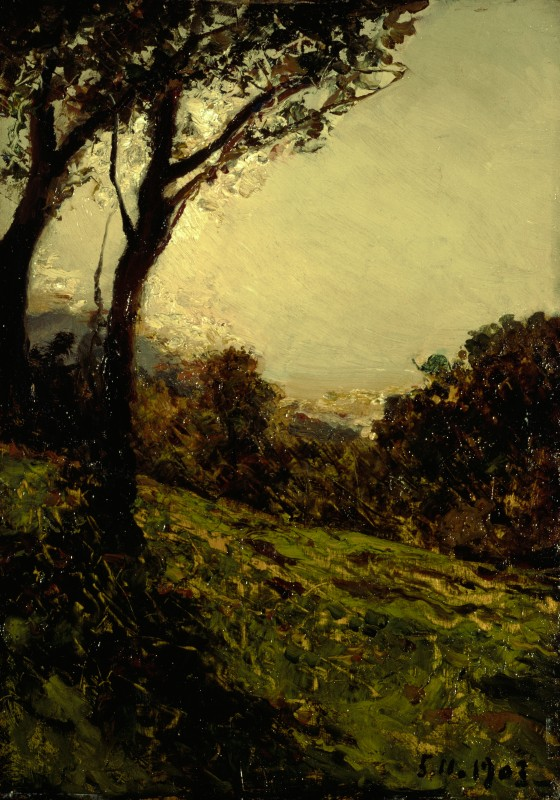
151. Lorenzo Delleani, Autunno dorato, 1903

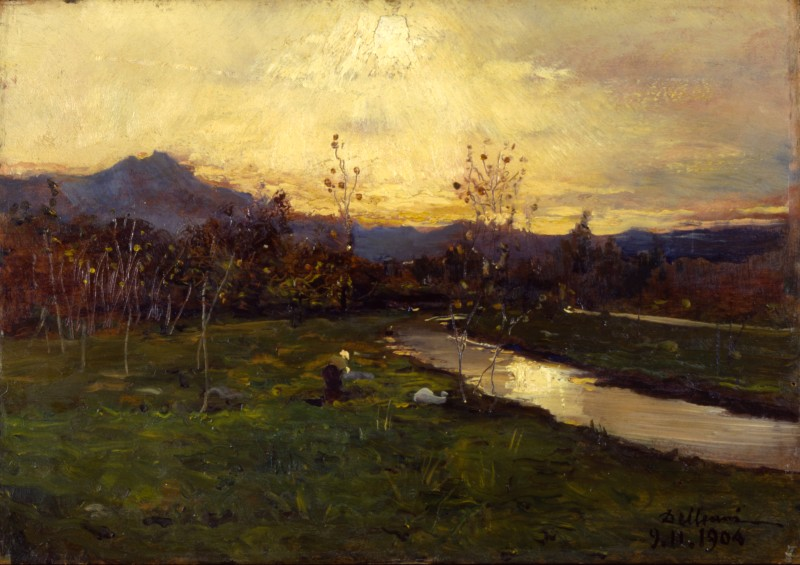
152. Lorenzo Delleani, Autunno dorato (Tramonto a novembre), 1904

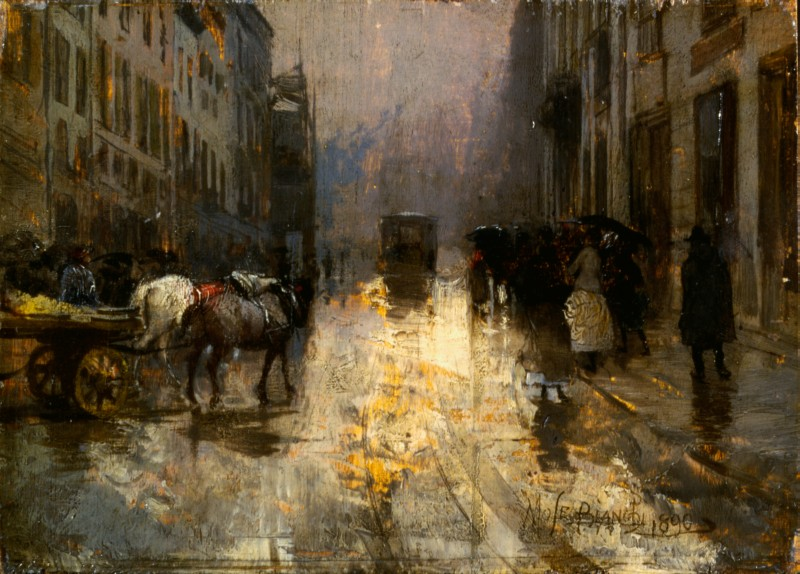
155. Mosè Bianchi, Vecchia Milano, 1890

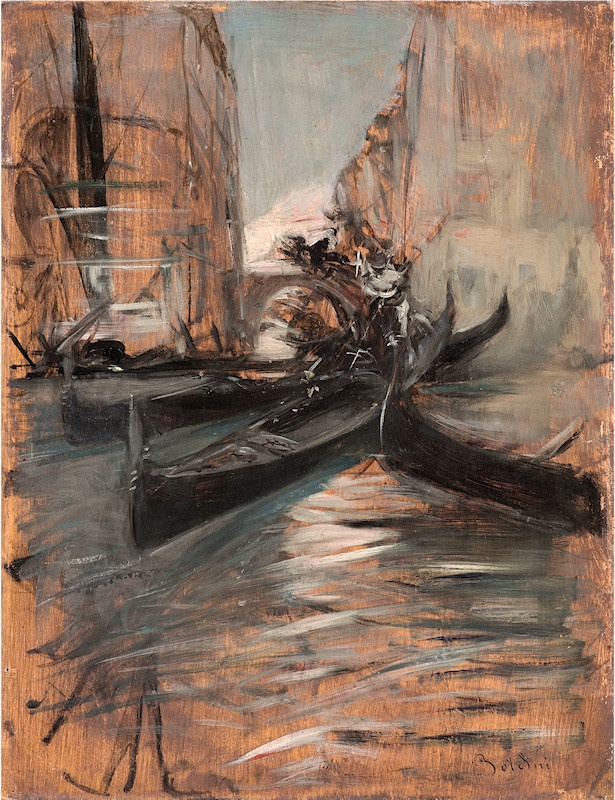
156. Giovanni Boldini, Canale a Venezia, 1899-1913

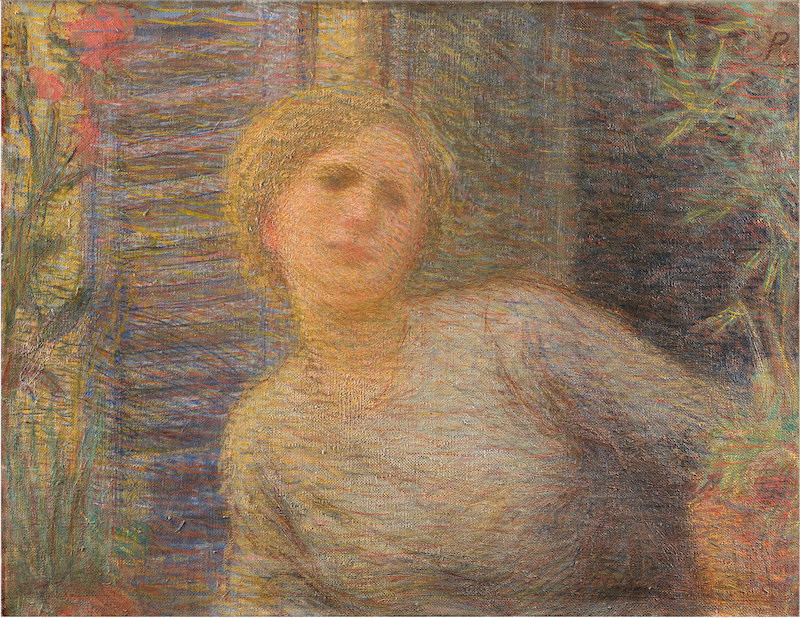
159. Plinio Nomellini, Ragazza alla finestra, 1891-1893

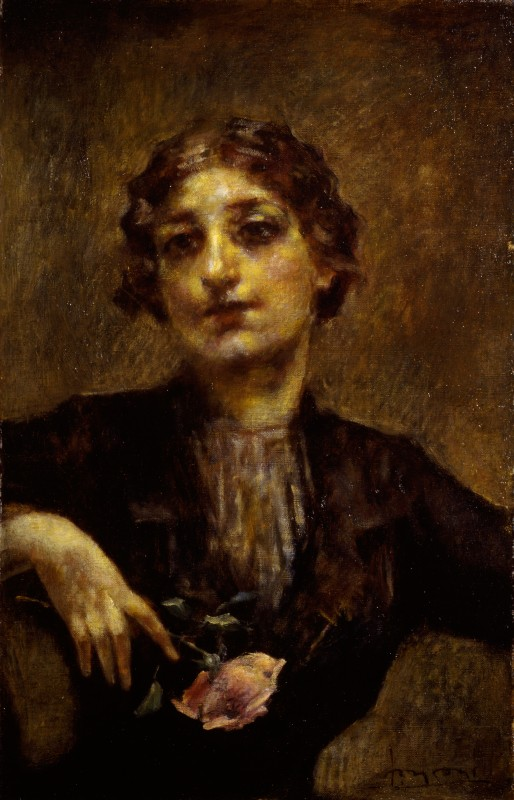
160. Luigi Conconi, La rosa, 1910-1915

==== Section XI: Alpine vedute ====
Alpine painting. From the sublime poetry to the landscape as an expression of feelings and emotions (Rooms 19 and 20).

Artworks
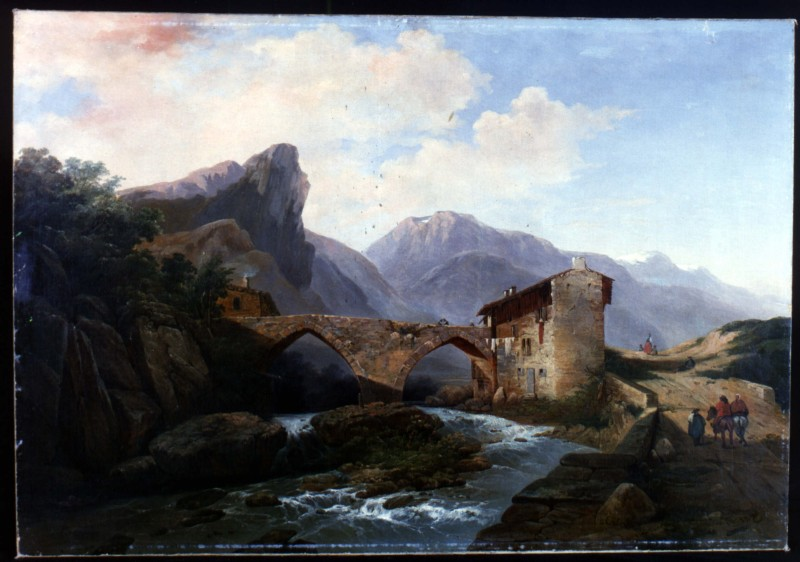
162. Ercole Calvi, Veduta della Brianza, 1860-1865

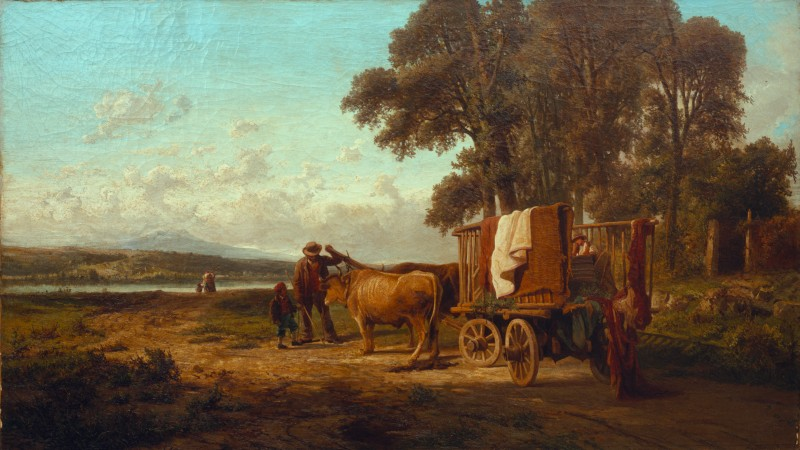
163. Carlo Mancini, Buoi aggiogati al carro sulle rive del Lago di Annone, 1857

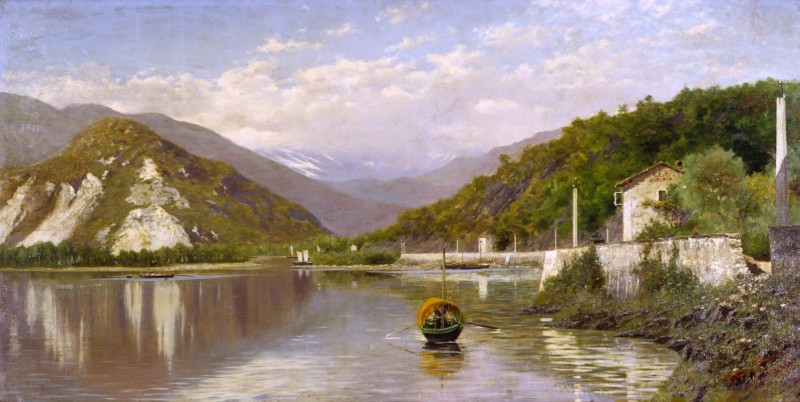
164. Francesco Gnecchi, Fondo Toce (Il Sempione dal Lago Maggiore), 1884

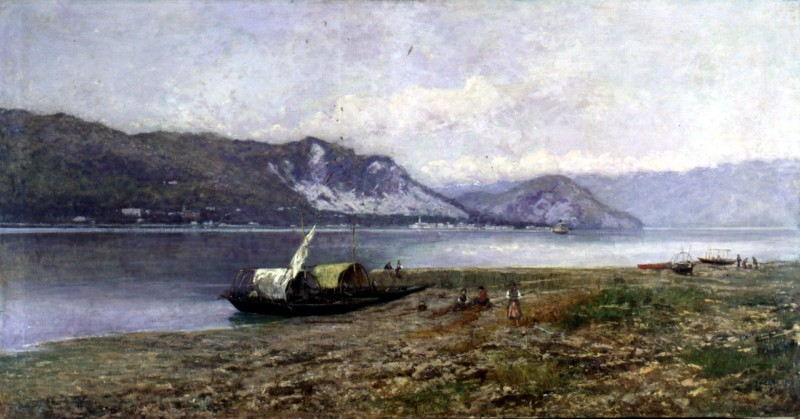
165. Lorenzo Gignous, Veduta del Lago Maggiore, 1885

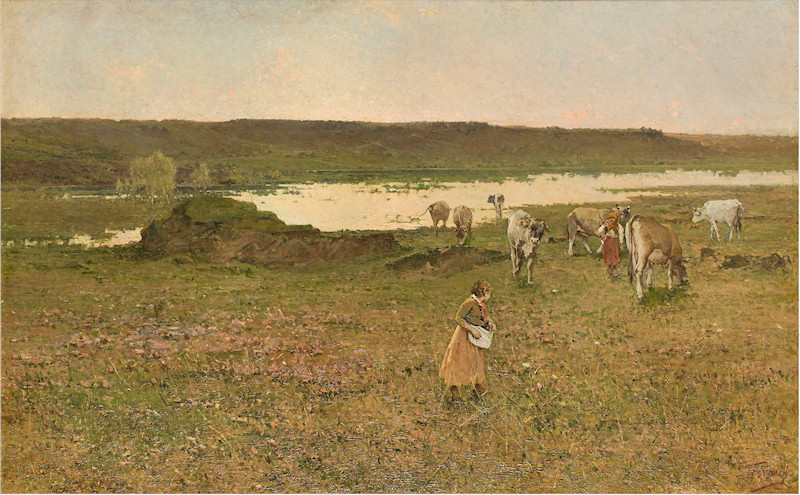
166. Achille Formis, Erica in fiore, 1906

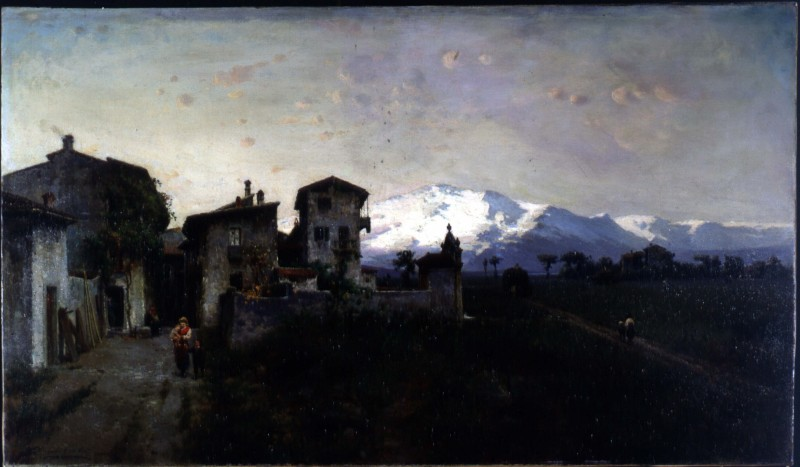
167. Ercole Calvi, Brughiera lombarda, 1887

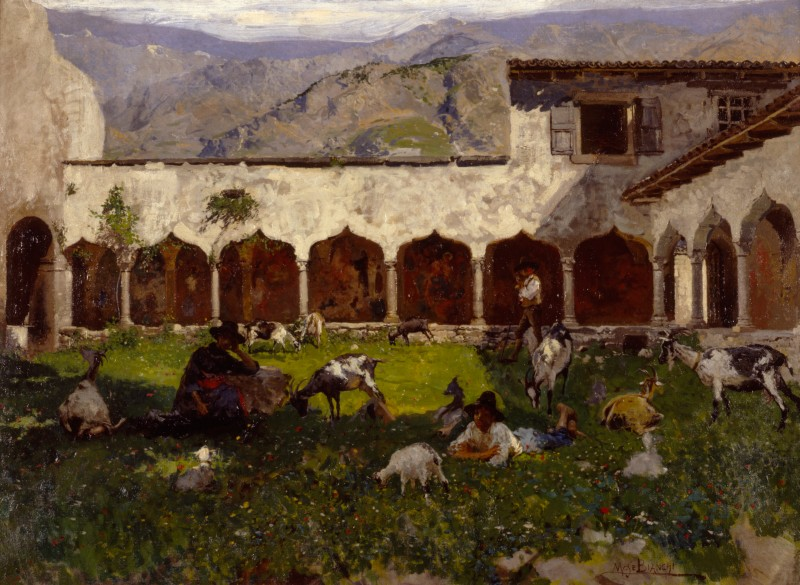
168. Mosè Bianchi, Chiostro, 1890

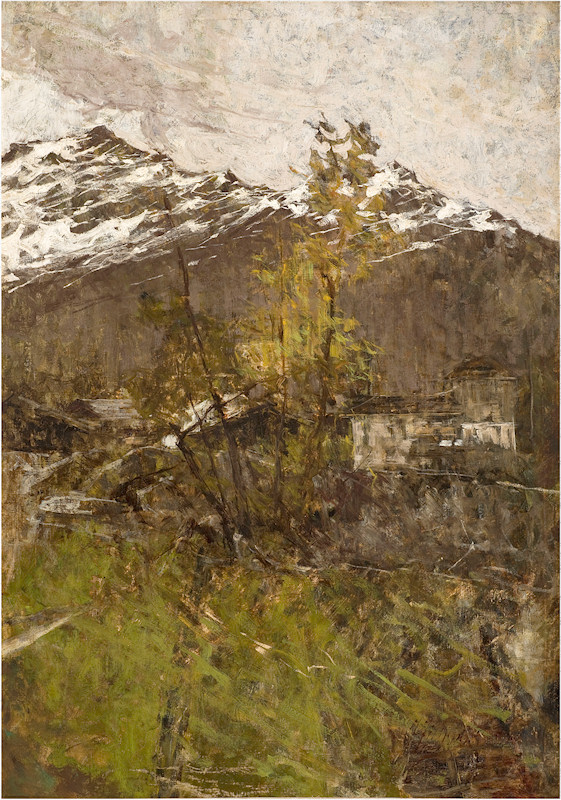
170. Francesco Filippini, Prime nevi, 1889

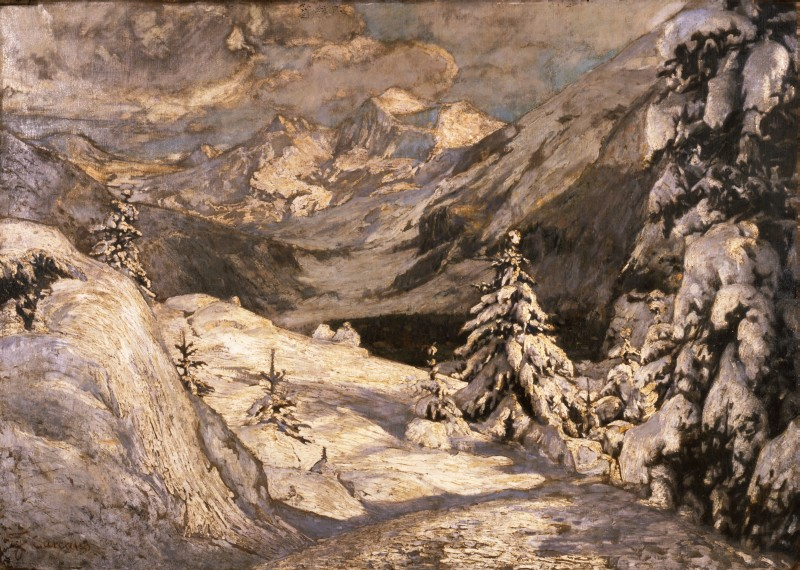
172. Filippo Carcano, In pieno inverno (Inverno in Engadina), 1909

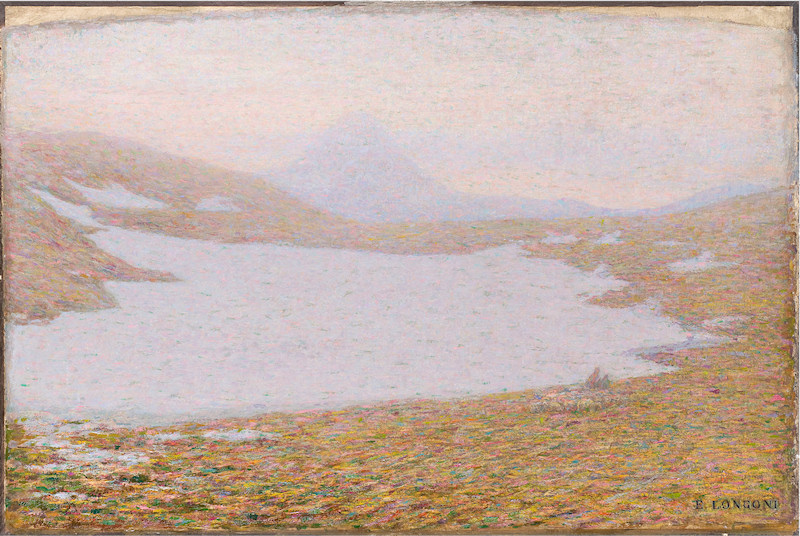
175. Emilio Longoni, Primavera in alta montagna, 1912

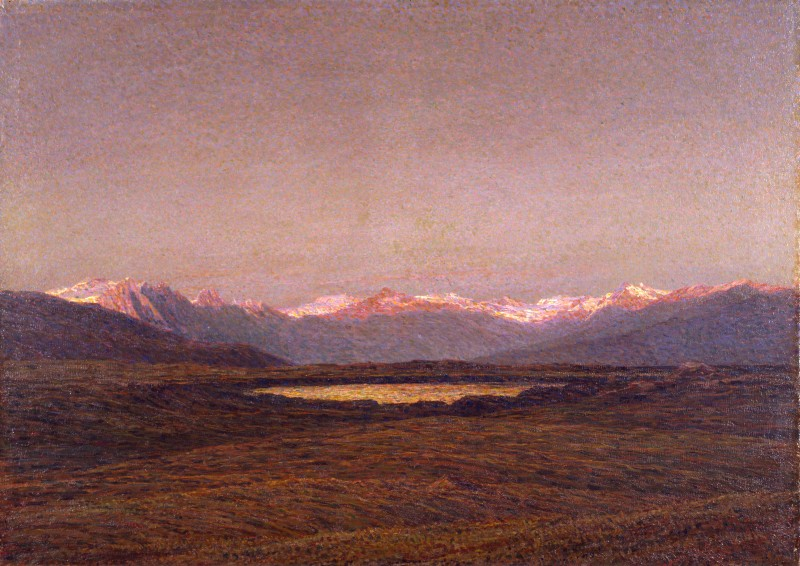
176. Carlo Cressini, Tramonto sereno (Foscagno - Valtellina), 1920-1925

==== Section XII: Symbolism ====
Symbolism. Between nature and allegory (Rooms 21 and 22).

Artworks
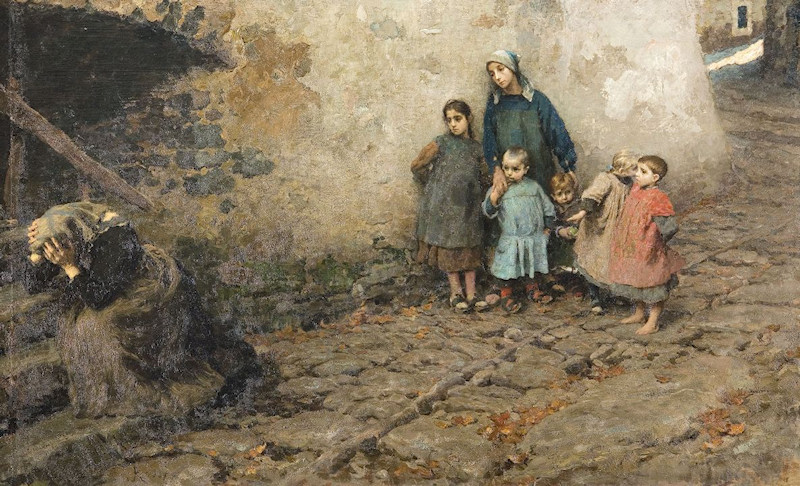
177. Luigi Rossi, La scuola del dolore, 1895

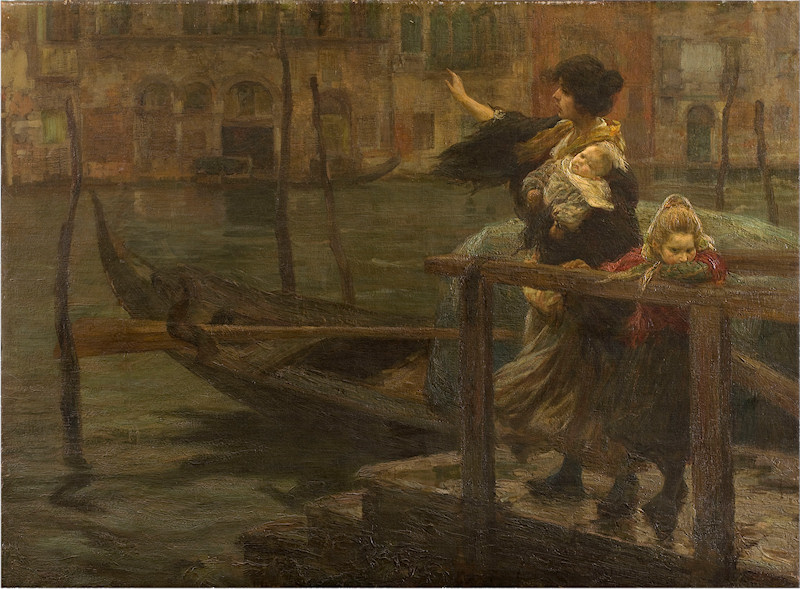
178. Alessandro Milesi, La traversata (La partenza del marinaio), 1901

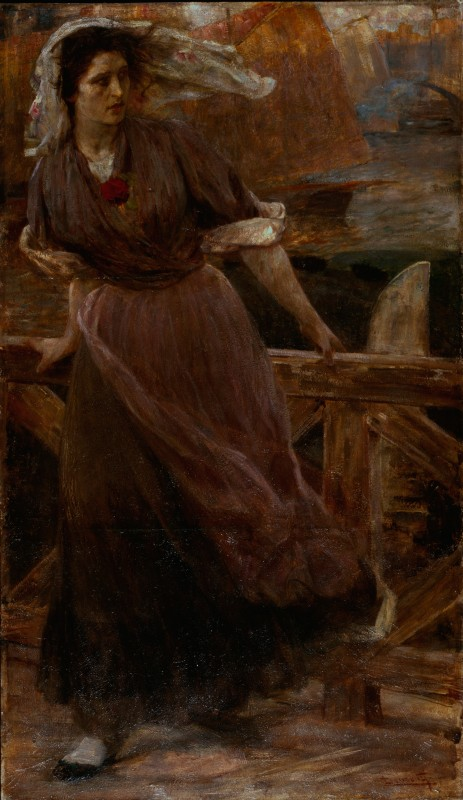
179. Cesare Laurenti, La meraviglia in attesa, 1900-1905

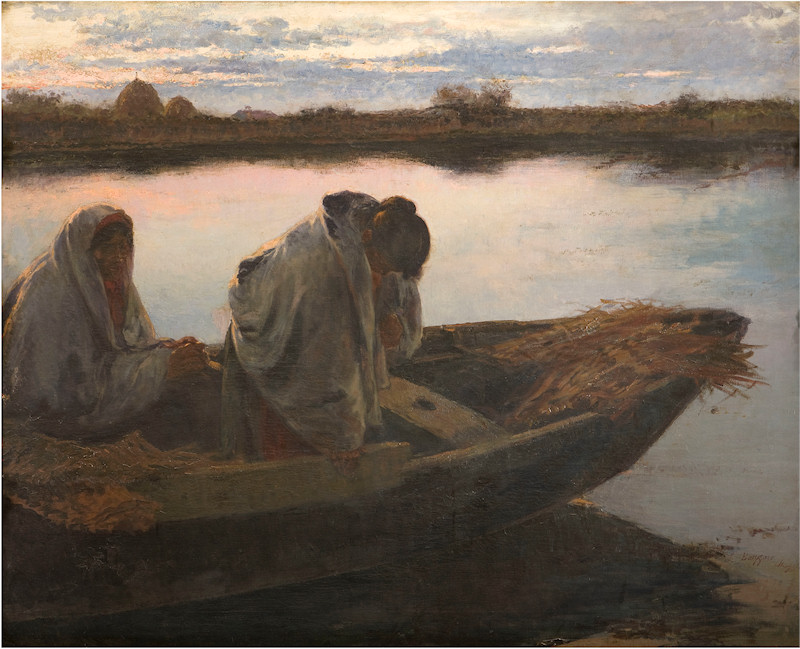
181. Leonardo Bazzaro, Orazione a Chioggia, 1897

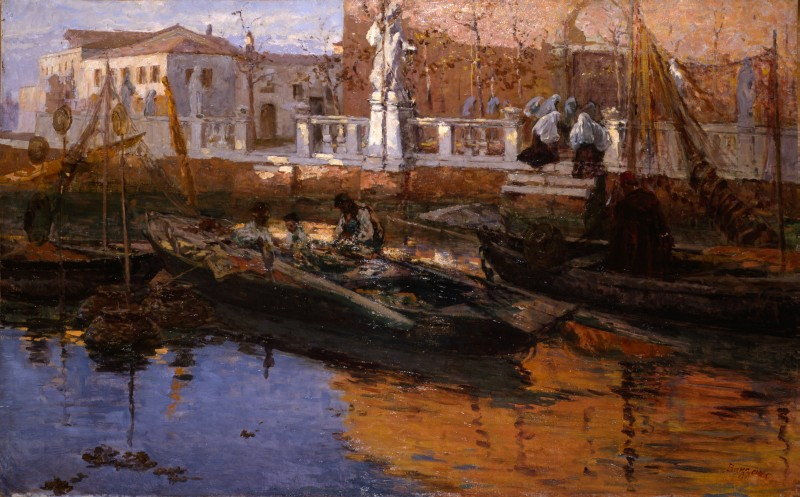
182. Leonardo Bazzaro, Alla Benedizione (Un vespro a Chioggia), 1898-1901

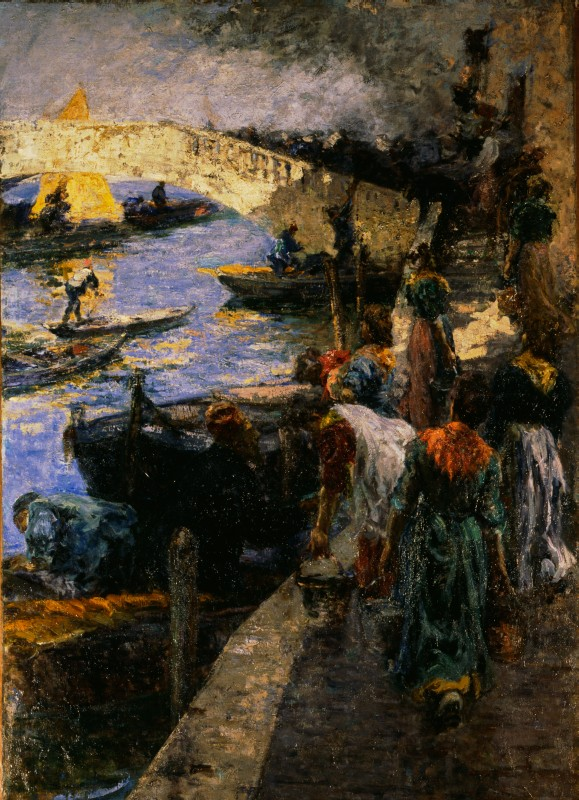
183. Leonardo Bazzaro, Fuoco! Fuoco! (L'incendio a Chioggia), 1905

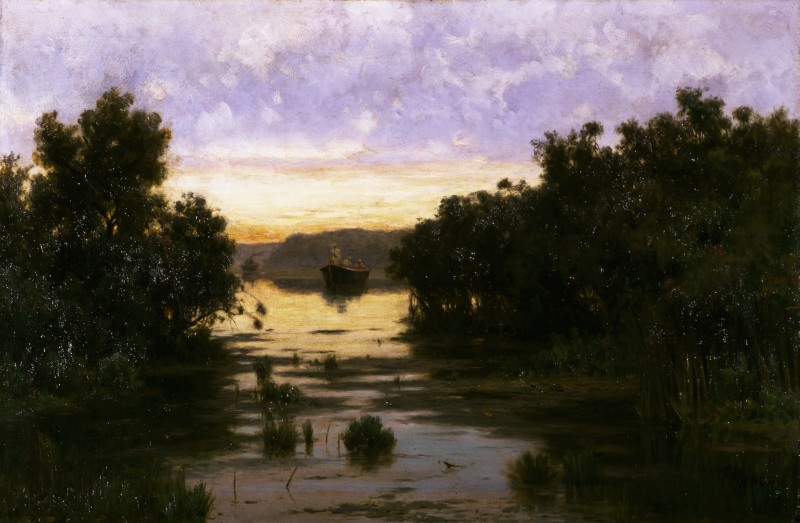
184. Francesco Lojacono, Le paludi, 1900-1910

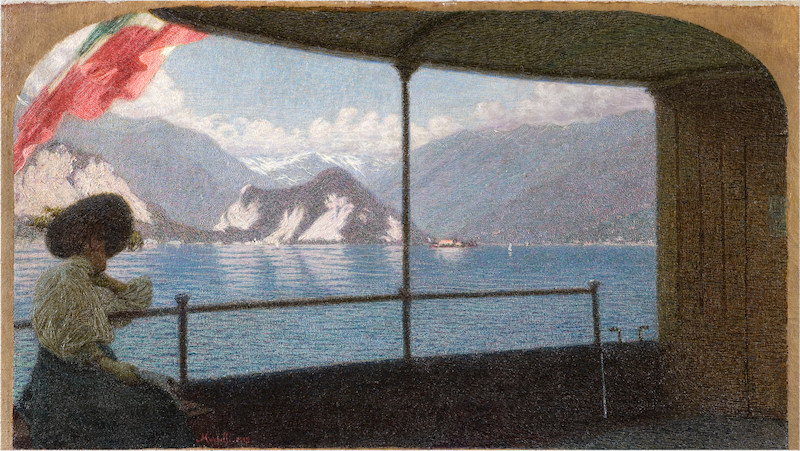
185. Angelo Morbelli, Battello sul Lago Maggiore, 1915

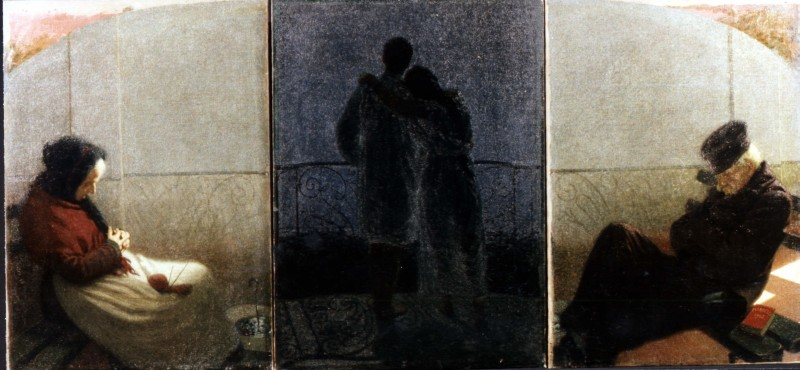
186. Angelo Morbelli, Sogno e realtà, 1905

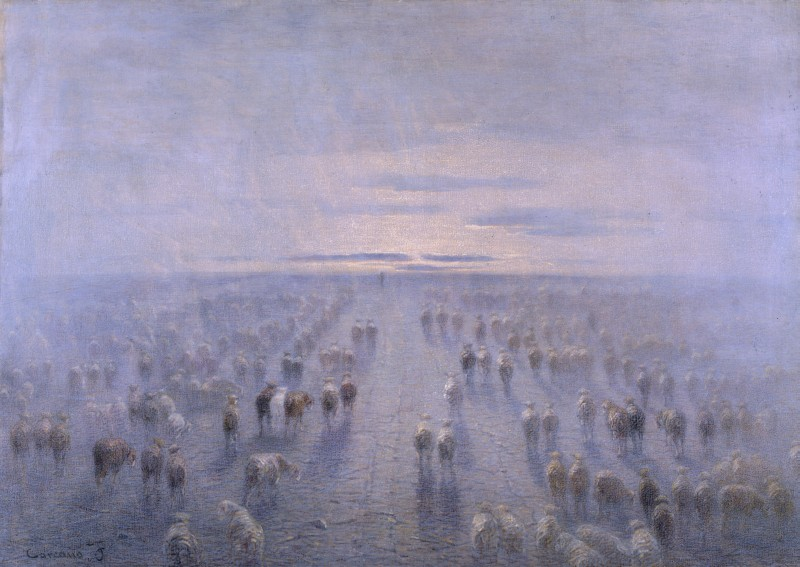
187. Filippo Carcano, Il gregge (L'Umanità), 1906

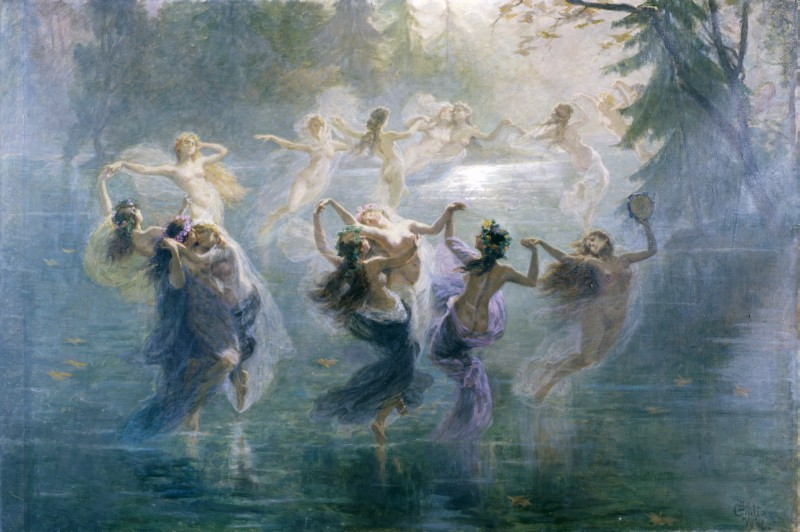
188. Bartolomeo Giuliano, Le Villi, 1906

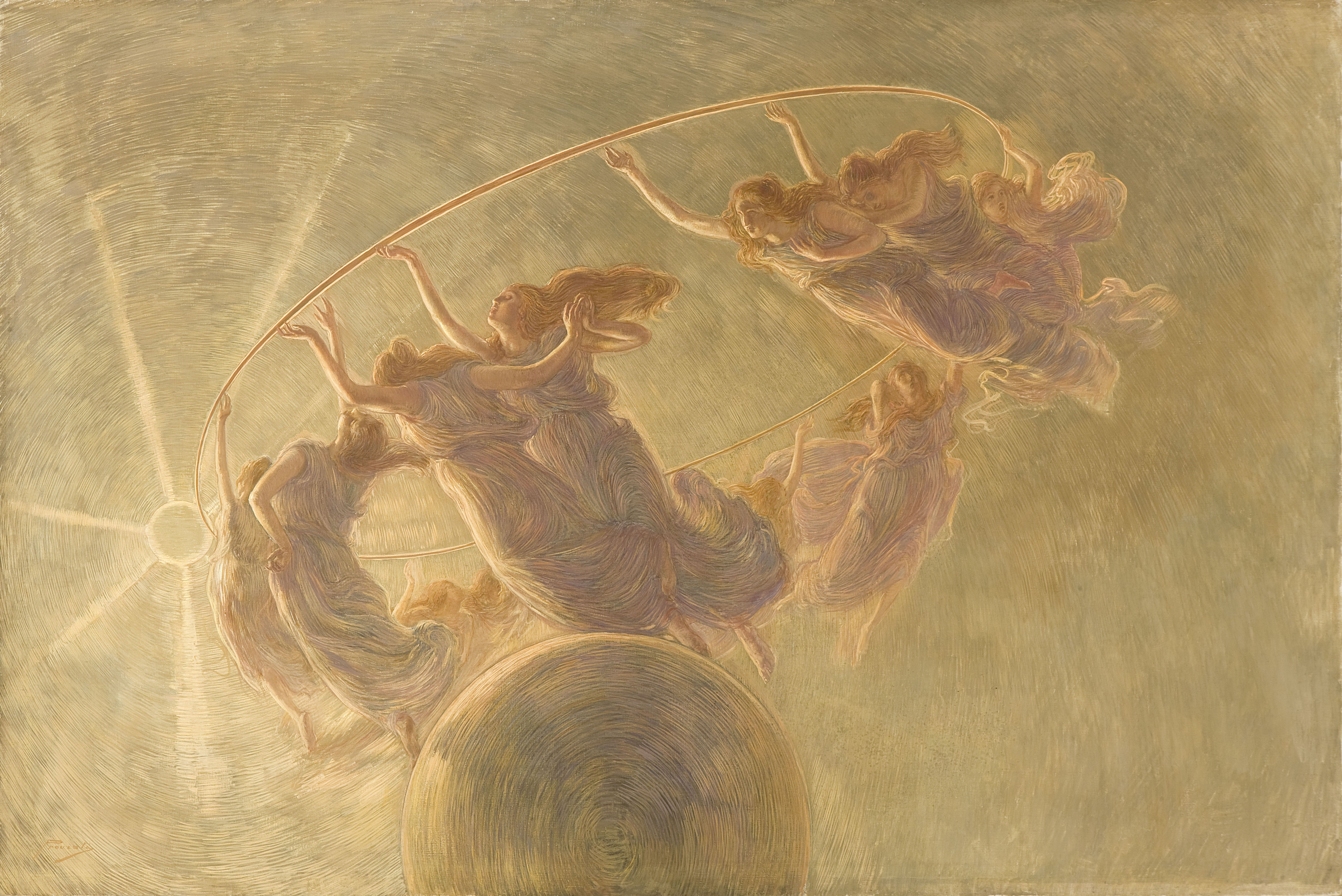
189. Gaetano Previati, La danza delle Ore, 1899

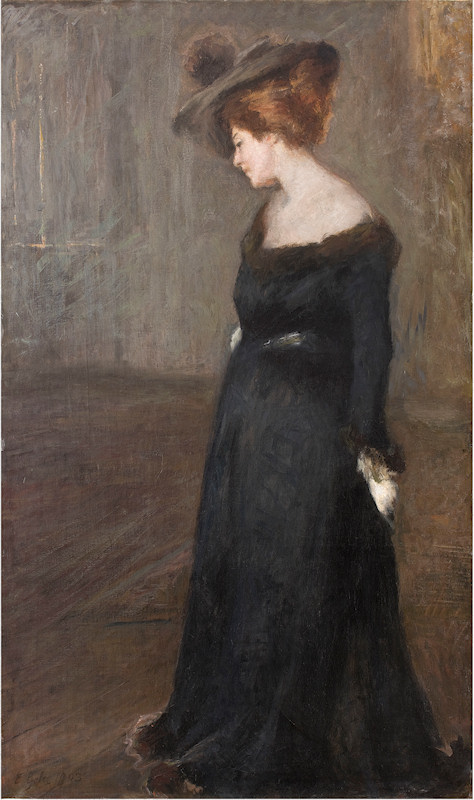
191. Emilio Gola, Ritratto di signora, 1903

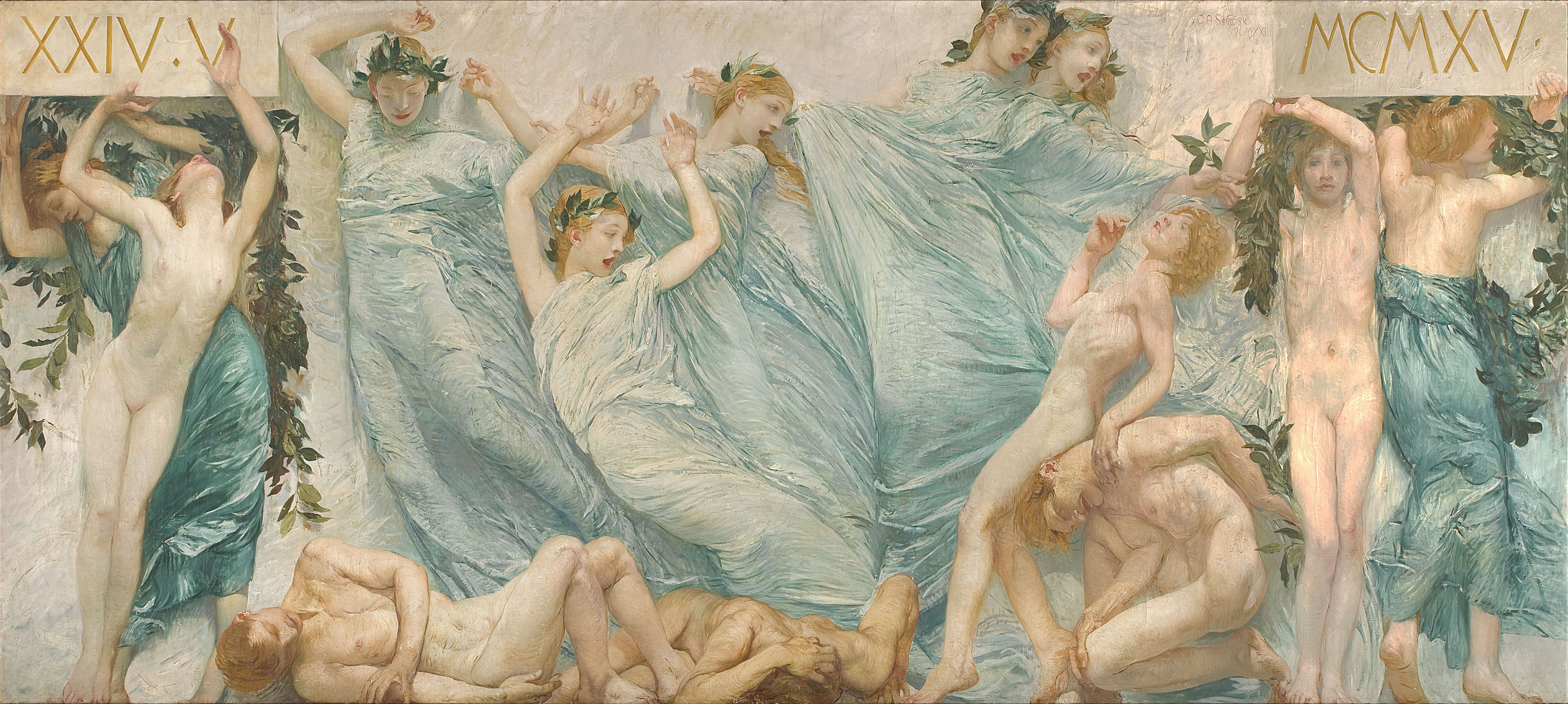
192. Giulio Aristide Sartorio, Risveglio, 1908-1923

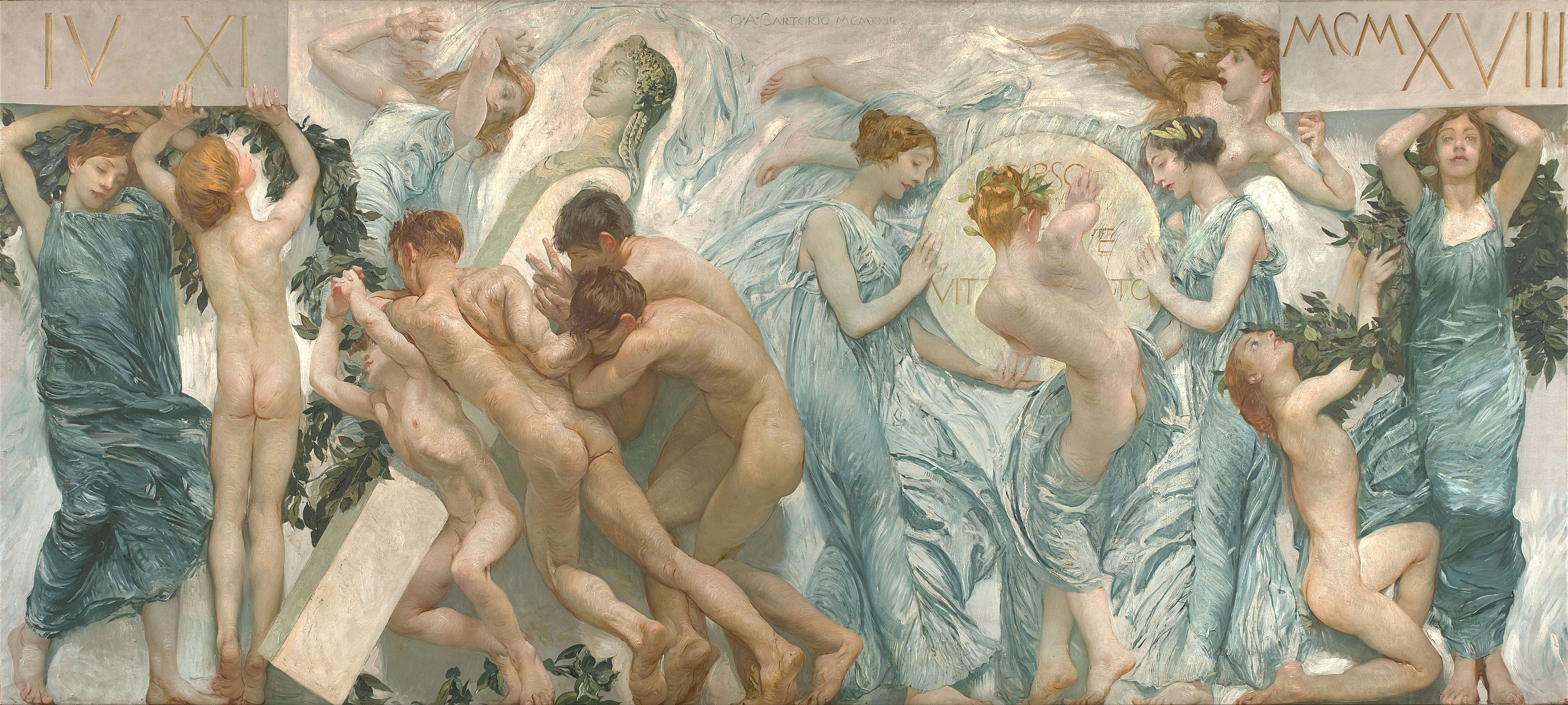
193. Giulio Aristide Sartorio, Sagra, 1908-1923

==== Section XIII: Umberto Boccioni. From Pointillism to Futurism ====
Umberto Boccioni. From Pointillism to Futurism (Room 23).

Artworks

194. Tre donne (La madre, la sorella e la modella Ines), 1909–1910 195. Officine a Porta Romana, 1910 196. Donna in giardino, 1910 197. Campagna con alberi e ruscello (Rio), 1908

== Twentieth Century ==
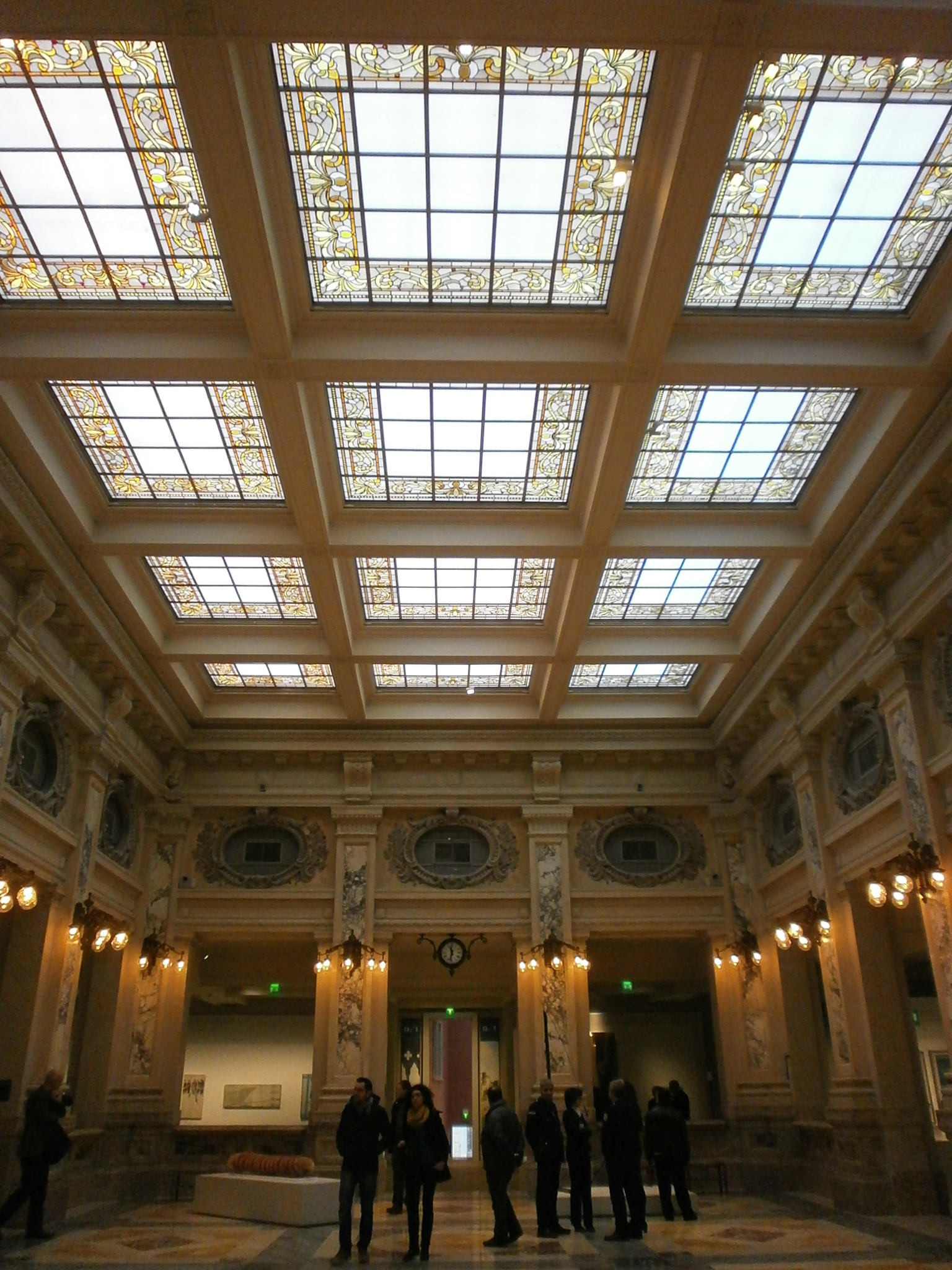
One of the museum's halls in the 20th century section

=== Sections ===
==== Ouverture 1 ====
- Section 1, Room 1: The memory of the image and its repression
- Section 2, Rooms 2-3-4: Lucio Fontana, Spatialism and the Nuclear Movement
- Section 3, Room 5: "Concrete" Abstract art between the Forties and the Fifties (MAC - Movimento Arte Concreta)
- Section 4, Room 6: Painting beyond painting. Action, tracks, imprints
- Section 5, Room 7: Forms of Informel
- Monographia 1, Room 8: Colour as a plastic form. A journey through a form of abstraction
- Monographia 2, Room 9: Emilio Isgrò, Italian Time
- Section 6, Room 10: Programmed and Kinetic art

==== Ouverture 2 ====
- Section 7, Room 11: The Sixties: signs, words, narratives
- Section 8, Room 12: The Sixties: things, images
- Section 9, Room 13: Around Arte Povera
- Section 10, Room 14: Conceptual practices
- Section 11, Room 15: Constructivist ideas
- Section 12, Room 16: Late twentieth century perspectives

=== Artworks ===
Full list
- Carla Accardi (Trapani 1924)
  - Green Red, 1963, acrylic on canvas, 96.7 x 146 cm
- Valerio Adami (Bologna 1935)
  - Auto-suggestion, 1965, acrylic on canvas, 73.3 x 94.3 cm
- Afro (Afro Basaldella) (Udine 1912 - Zürich 1976)
  - Unnamed, 1959, mixed media on canvas, 104 x 130 cm
  - Red Figure, 1964, mixed media on canvas-backed paper, 69.5 x 99.5 cm
- Vincenzo Agnetti (Milan 1926 - 1981)
  - Axiom, 1970, engraving on bakelite slate, 70 x 70 cm
- Carlo Alfano (Napoli 1932 - 1990)
  - Fragments of an Anonymous Self Portrait, 1975, mixed media (graphite, acrylic and magnetic tape) on canvas, 69 x 100 cm
- Giuseppe Allosia (Volterra, Pisa 1910 - Genova 1983)
  - Untitled, 1959, oil on wood panel, 67.5 x 41 cm
- Getulio Alviani (Udine 1939)
  - Surface, circa 1965, screen print on metal, 67 x 64 x 1 cm
- Giovanni Anceschi (Milan 1939)
  - Fluid Routes, 1961, polyethylene piping, coloured liquid, lacquered wood, 55 x 55 cm
- Franco Angeli (Rome 1935 - 1988)
  - Unum, 1966, mixed media on canvas, 50 x 140 cm
- Rodolfo Aricò (Milan 1930 - 2002)
  - Untitled, 1960, oil on canvas, 150 x 150 cm
  - General Perspective 2 (For Paolo Uccello), 1970, acrylic on canvas, 98 x 282 cm
- Stefano Arienti (Asola, Mantova 1961)
  - Water Lilies, 1990, plasticine on poster mounted on Leger panel, 90 x 121 cm
- Edmondo Bacci (Venice 1913 - 1978)
  - Composition, 1960-1961, oil on canvas, 75 x 90 cm
- Enrico Baj (Milan 1924 - Vergiate, Varese 2003)
  - Nuclear Landscape, 1951, oil and enamel on canvas glued to masonite, 29 x 52.3 cm
  - See in it what you will, 1951, oil and enamel on canvas, 69.7 x 99.8 cm
- Giacomo Balla (Turin 1871 - Rome 1958)
  - Abstract Study (Two Palm Trees in the Light), 1920, oil and pencil on wood panel, 37 x 28 cm
- Marina Ballo Charmet (Milan 1952)
  - Untitled (dalla serie Out of the corner of the Eye), 1993, photographic print in black and white on metal support, 102 x 153 cm
- Mario Ballocco (Milan 1913 - 2008)
  - Lattice, 1951, tempera on paper, 25 x 35 cm
- Luciano Bartolini (Fiesole, Firenze 1948 - Milan 1994)
  - Ariadne and Pythagoras, 1987, oil, rice paper, gold leaf and watercolour on paper, 149 x 199 cm
- Gianfranco Baruchello (Livorno 1924)
  - Puma skin - Rosa Selamort attacking the City, 1975, pencil, inks, tempera and enamel on aluminium, 150 x 150 cm
- Davide Benati (Reggio Emilia 1949)
  - Land of the Morning Calm, 1985, watercolour on paper, 130 x 150 cm
- Vasco Bendini (Bologna 1922)
  - Image (Tracks), 1957, oil and mixed media on canvas, 110 x 90 cm
- Gianni Bertini (Pisa 1922 - Caen 2010)
  - Untitled, 1950, oil on canvas, 41 x 50 cm
  - Something has happened, 1966, photographic print on canvas, 61.5 x 54.5 cm
- Domenico Bianchi (Anagni, Frosinone 1955)
  - Untitled, 1991, wax on polyester support and glass fibre, 80 x 60 cm
- Remo Bianco (Milan 1922 - 1988)
  - Imprint 15 A, 1960, mixed media on canvas, 100 x 75 cm
- Alberto Biasi (Padova 1937)
  - Untitled, 1972, PVC relief (double-layered) on painted wood panel, 68 x 68 x 4 cm
- Guido Biasi (Napoli 1933 - Paris 1982)
  - Spectator of a Comet, 1957, oil and enamel on canvas, 150,3 x 99.3 cm
- Annibale Biglione (Settimo Vittone, Turin 1923 - Pietra Ligure, Savona 1981)
  - Abstract Work, 1950, tempera on canvas-backed paper, 60 x 41 cm
- Renato Birolli (Verona 1905 - Milan 1959)
  - Fire in the Cinque Terre, 1955, oil on canvas, 114 x 122 cm
- Irma Blank (Celle 1934)
  - Page, 1977, Indian ink on paper, 23 x 30 cm
- Alighiero Boetti (Turin 1940 - Rome 1994)
  - Untitled, 1966, wood, rope, eye bolts, 99.7 x 99.7 cm
  - AI IEOOEI LGHRBTT, 1975, blue ball-point pen on canvas-backed paper, two elements, 100 x 70 cm each
- Agostino Bonalumi (Vimercate, Milan 1935)
  - Red, 1964, extroflexed canvas and vinyl tempera, 70.5 x 60 x 4.5 cm
- Davide Boriani (Milan 1936)
  - Magnetic Surface, 1962, iron, magnets, glass, motor, 46 x 46 cm
- Alberto Burri (Città di Castello, Perugia 1915 - Nice 1995)
  - Sand, 1952, mixed media on canvas, 90 x 108.5 cm
  - Red Black, 1953, olio, oil, enamels, canvas, pumice sand on canvas, 98.8 x 85.2 cm
- Corrado Cagli (Ancona 1910 - Rome 1976)
  - Cellular Rhythm, 1949, tempera on cardboard glued to plywood, 69.2 x 100.5 cm
- Angelo Candiano (Modica, Ragusa 1962)
  - Mutant, 1996, photographic print in black and white, 40.5 x 40.5 cm
  - Mutant, 1996, photographic print in black and white, 40.5 x 40.5 cm
  - Mutant, 1996, photographic print in black and white on paper, incision/cut along a section of the photographed object; inside, blank photographic paper on rigid support, 85.5 x 85.5 cm
- Giuseppe Capogrossi (Rome 1900 - 1972)
  - Surface 154, 1956, oil on canvas, 80 x 100 cm
- Carol Rama (Olga Carol Rama) (Turin 1918)
  - Untitled, 1961, mixed media on canvas, 40.5 x 30 cm
- Nicola Carrino (Taranto 1932)
  - Vertical Construction, 1989, iron, 503.5 x 150 x 165 cm
- Bruno Cassinari (Piacenza 1912 - Milan 1992)
  - Still Life with Fish, 1952, oil on backed canvas, 60 x 70 cm
- Enrico Castellani (Castelmassa, Rovigo 1930)
  - White Surface (Homage to the Dawn), 1971, acrylic on extroflexed and introflexed canvas, 141 x 212 cm
- Alik Cavaliere (Rome 1926 - Milan 1998)
  - Long Live Freedom, 1976, iron, bronze, objects, 227 x 105 x 103 cm
- Umberto Cavenago (Milan 1959)
  - Pedestal, circa 1989, whitened, galvanised sheet on wheels, 150 x 40 x 20 cm
- Mino Ceretti (Milan 1930)
  - Untitled, 1965, acrylic on canvas, 100 x 100 cm
- Mario Ceroli (Castel Frentano, Chieti 1938)
  - Daria, 1967, untreated packaging wood (Russian pine), 175 x 43 x 23 cm
- Sandro Chia (Firenze 1946)
  - Little man when you feel comfortable, since you’re in your own home, 1976, pencil, oil and tempera on canvas-backed paper, 80 x 80 cm
- Ennio Chiggio (Napoli 1938)
  - Untitled, 1966, acrylic on wood and glass, 49 x 49 x 4 cm
- Alfredo Chighine (Milan 1914 - Pisa 1974)
  - Orange Composition on a Blue Background, 1956, oil on canvas, 116.5 x 81 cm
- Francesco Clemente (Napoli 1952)
  - Diptych, 18 non-separable photographs, 1973, photographic print on paper, two elements, 26 x 26 cm each
  - Untitled, 1980, pencil and pastel on paper mounted on canvas, 45 x 61.7 cm
- Jack Clemente (Novara 1926 - Milan 1974)
  - Untitled, 1962, mixed media on canvas, 97 x 130 cm
- Ettore Colla (Parma 1896 - Rome 1968)
  - Iron (Polychrome Sculpture or Astro form), 1952, coloured iron, 165 x 130 x 36 cm
- Gianni Colombo (Milan 1937 - Melzo, Milan 1993)
  - Fluid Structure, 1960, steel, glass and painted wood, 50 x 50 x 4.5 cm
  - Elastic Space, 1970, lacquered wood and elastic, 100 x 100 cm
- Joe Cesare Colombo (Milan 1930 - 1971)
  - Untitled, 1952, mixed media on canvas, 79.1 x 100 cm
- Pietro Consagra (Mazara del Vallo, Trapani 1920 - Milan 2005)
  - Double-sided Caucasus Moonstone, 1976, Caucasus moonstone, 88.5 x 78 x 24.5 cm
- Antonio Corpora (Tunisi 1909 - Rome 2004)
  - Boat under Construction, 1952, oil on canvas, 81,5 x 100 cm
- Toni Costa (Padova 1935)
  - Optical Dynamical Structure, 1970, polyethylene and wood, 75 x 75 cm
- Roberto Crippa (Monza 1921 - Bresso, Milan 1972)
  - Spirals, 1952, oil on canvas, 100 x 100.5 cm
- Enzo Cucchi (Morro d’Alba, Ancona 1949)
  - Untitled, 1993, charcoal on cardboard mounted on canvas, 130 x 70 cm
- Dadamaino (Eduarda Maino) (Milan 1930 - 2004)
  - Unstable Visual Object, 1963, milled aluminium and nylon threads, painted wood, 50 x 50 x 5.5 cm
- Sergio Dangelo (Milan 1932)
  - La pluie, le beau temps, 1953, enamel on canvas, 44 x 80 cm
- Nicola De Maria (Foglianise, Benevento 1954)
  - Untitled, 1992, oil on canvas, 40 x 30 cm
- Bruno De Toffoli (Treviso 1913 - Venice 1978)
  - Ritmo nelle forme, 1949, gesso, 203 x 74 x 68 cm
- Gabriele De Vecchi (Milan 1938 - 2011)
  - U.R.M.N.T., 1962, metal grid, canvas, plywood and electric motor, 50 x 50 cm
- Lucio Del Pezzo (Napoli 1933)
  - Large Writing (metrò), 1962, collage and enamel on wood panel, 146 x 114 cm
- Mario Deluigi (Treviso 1901 - Venice 1978)
  - Untitled, 1953-1954, mixed media on wood panel, primed with gesso, 70 x 65.5 cm
- Bruno Di Bello (Torre del Greco, Napoli 1938)
  - Photo/graph, 1977, photographic print on canvas, 50 x 35 cm
- Nino Di Salvatore (Verbania 1924 - Milan 2001)
  - Active Space, 1949, oil on canvas applied to wood panel, 100 x 80 cm
- Enrico Donati (Milan 1909 - New York 2008)
  - White Magma, 1952, mixed media on canvas, 40 x 50 cm
- Piero Dorazio (Rome 1927 - Perugia 2005)
  - Plasticity, 1949, mixed media on canvas, 73 x 60 cm
  - Snake, 1968, oil on canvas, 175 x 350 cm
  - Doric IV, 1971, oil on canvas, 199.5 x 61 cm
- Gillo Dorfles (Trieste 1910)
  - Intersection II, 1956, oil on canvas, 55 x 80 cm
- Gianni Dova (Rome 1925 - Pisa 1991)
  - Untitled, 1952, oil on canvas, 50 x 40 cm
- Enzo Esposito (Benevento 1946)
  - Untitled, 1986, mixed media on canvas, 152 x 200 cm
- Agenore Fabbri (Barba, Pistoia 1911 - Savona 1998)
  - Character, 1961, polychrome wood, 85 x 22 x 18 cm
- Luciano Fabro (Turin 1936 - Milan 2007)
  - Herb Habitat (A), 1980, Indian ink and watercolour on canvas-backed paper, 60.5 x 80.5 cm
  - Herb Habitat (B), 1980, Indian ink, watercolour and pencil on paper, 101 x 68.5 cm
  - De Italia, 1972, “riviera” leather, natural colour, 102 x 96 cm
- Vincenzo Ferrari (Cremona 1941 - Milan 2012)
  - Doing, 1977, mixed media on wood panel, 45 x 45 cm
- Tano Festa (Rome 1938 - 1988)
  - Michelangelo according to Tano Festa, 1967, enamel on canvas, 100 x 80.6 cm
- Giosetta Fioroni (Rome 1932)
  - Detail from the Birth of Venus, 1965, oil on canvas, 100 x 200 cm
- Lucio Fontana (Rosario di Santa Fé 1899 - Comabbio, Varese 1968)
  - Spatial Concept, 1951 [1949], acrylic on paper glued on canvas, 68 x 70 cm
  - Spatial Concept, 1952, mixed media on perforated paper, silver and yellow patches on blue-grey background, 34.5 x 49.5 cm
  - Spatial Concept, 1956, sequins on canvas-backed, perforated paper, 58 x 43.5 cm
  - Spatial Concept. Expectations, 1959-1960, water-based paint on canvas, white, 64.5 x 42.5 cm
  - Spatial Concept: Venice Moon, 1961, oil and glass on canvas, 150 x 150 cm
  - Spatial Concept. Expectations, 1964, water-based paint on canvas, white, 53 x 64 cm
  - Spatial Concept. Expectations, 1967, water-based paint on canvas, white, 81 x 65 cm
  - Spatial Concept, 1967, lacquered, perforated metal, 110 x 110 x 10.5 cm
  - Spatial Concept, 1967, lacquered and cut metal, red, h. 128 cm, dia. 49 cm
- Pinot Gallizio (Alba, Cuneo 1902 - 1964)
  - Untitled, 1962, oil on cardboard, 50 x 70 cm
- Franco Garelli (Diano d’Alba, Cuneo 1909 - Turin 1973)
  - Figure, 1958, iron on wooden base, painted grey, 63 x 20.5 x 16 cm
- Alberto Garutti (Galbiate, Lecco 1948)
  - Wood, 1991, mixed media (wood and aluminium), 155 x 120 cm
- Piero Gilardi (Turin 1942)
  - Watermelons, 1966, foam, 70 x 100 x 15 cm
- Giorgio Griffa (Turin 1936)
  - Painting, 1977, acrylic on canvas, 215 x 230 cm
- Renato Guttuso (Bagheria, Palermo 1912 - Rome 1987)
  - Prickly Pears, 1962, oil on canvas, 115 x 146 cm
- Paolo Iacchetti (Milan 1953)
  - Aboulia, 1990, oil on canvas, 113 x 185 cm
- Emilio Isgrò (Barcellona Pozzo di Gotto, Messina 1937)
  - Untitled, 1972, book, tempera on paper, 39 x 59 cm
  - Italian Time, 1986, photo, acrylic and assemblage (clock) on wood panel, 20 elements, dia. 100 cm
- Massimo Kaufmann (Milan 1963)
  - Untitled, 1992, mixed media (oil, ink and combustion) on canvas, 100 x 100 cm
- Jannis Kounellis (Pireo, Atene 1936)
  - Untitled, 1963, mixed media on canvas, 140 x 165 cm
  - Untitled, 1959-1966, tempera on paper, 69.5 x 98.5 cm
- Ketty La Rocca (La Spezia 1938 - Firenze 1976)
  - Appendix to an Appeal, 1971, typographical print on paper, two pages, mounted on wood panel, 31 x 34 cm
- Edoardo Landi (San Felice sul Panaro, Modena 1937)
  - Orthogonal Structure + Chromatic Influence, 1964, interwoven coloured pieces of light cardboard, 38.5 x 38.5 cm
- Alberto Magnelli (Firenze 1888 - Meudon 1971)
  - Avec préméditation, 1947, oil on canvas, 130 x 96.8 cm
- Luigi Mainolfi (Rotondi, Avellino 1948)
  - Landscape, 1982, relief in terracotta, 60 x 90 x 16 cm
- Pompilio Mandelli (Luzzara, Reggio Emilia 1914 - Bologna 2006)
  - The Verziere, 1955, oil on canvas, 85.5 x 100.5 cm
- Edgardo Mannucci (Fabriano, Ancona 1904 - Arcevia, Ancona 1986)
  - Idea, 1963, metal, 62 x 52 x 8 cm
- Piero Manzoni (Soncino, Cremona 1933 - Milan 1963)
  - Achrome, 1958, kaolin and wrinkled canvas, 70 x 100 cm
- Giuseppe Maraniello (Napoli 1945)
  - Gifts, 1987, bronze, 270 x 110 x 130 cm
- Elio Marchegiani (Siracusa 1929)
  - Weights of Colour on Plaster Support, 1974, mixed media on plaster support, 50 x 70 cm
- Enzo Mari (Cerano, Novara 1932)
  - Ambiguous Alternation, 1965-1968, light cardboard, corrugated cardboard, polystyrene, methacrylate, 33.5 x 33.5 x 7 cm
- Manfredo Massironi (Padova 1937 - 2011)
  - Double Structure with Rotated Squares, 1965, painted cardboard, wood and glass, 53 x 53 x 9 cm
- Vittorio Matino (Tirana 1943)
  - Viennese, 1989, acrylic on canvas, 140 x 517 cm
- Fabio Mauri (Rome 1926 - 2009)
  - What is a Screen, 1965, oil on canvas, 112 x 123 cm
- Fausto Melotti (Rovereto, Trento 1901 - Milan 1986)
  - Couple, circa 1970, brass, 63 x 18 x 14 cm
- Eugenio Miccini (Firenze 1925 - 2007)
  - Gods do not like disorder, 1972, mixed media on canvas, 110 x 110 cm
- Umberto Milani (Milan 1912 - 1969)
  - Grey, Pink and Blue, 1961, oil on canvas, 100 x 100 cm
- Aldo Mondino (Turin 1938 - 2005)
  - Rencontres, 1968, acrylic on canvas, with pencil and black marker, 115.5 x 89.5 cm
- Gianni Monnet (Turin 1912 - Milan 1958)
  - Inside, 1947, oil on canvas, 50 x 70 cm
- Mattia Moreni (Pavia 1920 - Brisighella, Ravenna 1999)
  - The Quarry, 1955, oil on canvas, 150.5 x 150,5 cm
- Ennio Morlotti (Lecco 1910 - Milan 1992)
  - Calendulas, 1955, oil on canvas, 61 x 85 cm
- Bruno Munari (Milan 1907 - 1998)
  - Negative-Positive Yellow-Red, 1951, acrylic on canvas, 100 x 100 cm
- Mario Nigro (Pistoia 1917 - Livorno 1992)
  - Untitled, 1957, mixed media on paper on canvas, 99 x 73 cm
  - Three Reds, 1975, water-based paint on canvas, 81 x 81 cm
- Gastone Novelli (Wien 1925 - Milan 1968)
  - Geographical explorations (The Geographical Explorations or Geographical Exploration), 1963, mixed media on canvas, 70 x 90 cm
  - The Language of Man, 1963, mixed media on canvas, 100 x 100 cm
- Claudio Olivieri (Rome 1934)
  - Untitled, 1972, oil on canvas, 150 x 190 cm
- Luciano Ori (Firenze 1928 - 2007)
  - Toccata and Fugue (the ball) - Opus k. 732, 1974, photo (emulsion) on canvas, 95 x 65 cm
- Mimmo Paladino (Paduli, Benevento 1948)
  - North Sea, 1985, mixed media (iron and wood) and oil on wood, 121 x 86 cm
- Giulio Paolini (Genova 1940)
  - Demonstration, 1975, metal music stands; photographic prints; sheets of plexiglas
  - Narcissus, 1982, photograph on emulsion-coated canvas, 137 x 204 cm (two elements, 137 x 102 cm each)
- Gianfranco Pardi (Milan 1933 - 2012)
  - Apse, 1981, acrylic on canvas, 119 x 200 cm
  - Architecture, 1990, painted iron, 160 x 82 x 50 cm
- Claudio Parmiggiani (Luzzara, Reggio Emilia 1943)
  - Towards Byzantium, 1985, chalk and colour maps, 38.5 x 35 x 33 cm
- Pino Pascali (Bari 1935 - Rome 1968)
  - Rock, 1966, wood and painted canvas, 35 x 133 x 39 cm
  - Bristleworm, 1967, sixteen acrylic bristle brushes on metal support, 27.5 x 178.5 x 35 cm
- Giuseppe Penone (Garessio, Cuneo 1947)
  - Writes/Reads/Remembers, 1972, colour photographs in wooden frames and a steel bar with a wooden base, 35 x 70.5 x 13 cm
- Achille Perilli (Rome 1927)
  - Top of the Void, the Solidity of Silence, 1961, mixed media on canvas, 200 x 160 cm
- Cesare Peverelli (Milan 1922 - Paris 2000)
  - Painting, 1952, tempera on paper, 48 x 66 cm
- Michelangelo Pistoletto (Biella 1933)
  - Girl Walking, 1966, screen print on mirror-polished stainless steel, 230 x 120 cm
- Enrico Prampolini (Modena 1894 - Rome 1956)
  - Composition, 1949, oil on canvas-backed paper, 63 x 46 cm
- Mario Raciti (Milan 1934)
  - Story, 1963, mixed media on canvas-backed paper, 50 x 70 cm
- Mauro Reggiani (Nonantola, Modena 1897 - Milan 1980)
  - Composition no. 12, 1950, oil on canvas, 65 x 81 cm
- Regina (Regina Prassede Cassolo Bracchi) (Mede Lomellina, Pavia 1894 - Milan 1974)
  - MAC (or Untitled), 1953, collage on paper, 21 x 17 cm
  - Structure (Cosmodrome), 1952, painted wood and brass, wire and plexiglas, 27 x 26 x 20 cm, wooden base 18 x 26 x 2 cm
- Bepi Romagnoni (Milan, 1930 - Villasimius, Cagliari 1964)
  - Story, 1963, oil and collage on canvas-backed paper, 100 x 80 cm
- Mimmo Rotella (Catanzaro 1918 - Milan 2006)
  - Untitled, [1948], mixed media on wood panel, 50 x 40 cm
  - Mythology in Black and Red, 1962, décollage on canvas, 135 x 98 cm
- Piero Ruggeri (Turin 1930 - Avigliana, Turin 2009)
  - Head, 1958, oil on canvas, 70 x 50 cm
- Remo Salvadori (Cerreto Guidi, Firenze 1947)
  - In the Moment, 1988, lead foil, bent, 99 x 97.7 x 3.2 cm
- Antonio Sanfilippo (Partanna, Trapani 1923 - Rome 1980)
  - Composition, 1955, oil on canvas, 60 x 80 cm
- Giuseppe Santomaso (Venice 1907 - 1990)
  - Green Memory, 1953, oil on canvas, 120.2 x 150 cm
- Emilio Scanavino (Genova 1922 - Milan 1986)
  - Virginity, 1960, oil on canvas, 146 x 120 cm
- Paolo Scheggi (Firenze 1940 - Rome 1971)
  - For a Situation, 1962, acrylic on perforated, superimposed canvases, 50 x 60 cm
- Mario Schifano (Homs 1934 - Rome 1998)
  - Last Autumn, 1963, mixed media on canvas, 179 x 140 cm
  - Futurism Revisited, 1966, perspex and mixed media on paper, 100 x 52 cm
- Toti Scialoja (Rome 1914 - 1998)
  - White Imprints, 1959, mixed media on hemp, 114 x 236 cm
- Atanasio Soldati (Parma 1896 - 1953)
  - Composition, 1951, oil on canvas, 50 x 60 cm
- Ettore Spalletti (Cappelle sul Tavo, Pescara 1940)
  - Evening Sky, Peach Blossoms, Spring, 1983, impasto on wood panel, three elements, 81 x 100.5 cm each
- Domenico Spinosa (Napoli 1916 - 2007)
  - Trees and Sun, 1959, oil on wood panel, 97 x 80 cm
- Mauro Staccioli (Volterra, Pisa 1937)
  - Untitled, 1989, ferrocement, 110 x 350 x 50 cm
- Tancredi (Tancredi Parmeggiani) (Feltre, Belluno 1927 - Rome 1964)
  - Untitled, 1953, mixed media and pastels on Fabriano paper, 70 x 100 cm
  - Untitled, 1955, oil on masonite, 125 x 170.5 cm
- Marco Tirelli (Rome 1956)
  - Untitled, 1993, mixed media on canvas, 150 x 110 cm
- Grazia Toderi (Padova 1963)
  - There was something of the fairy in her, and nothing is more unbearable, judging by fairy tales, than living with a fairy..., 1994, cibachrome on aluminium, 80 x 120 cm
- Giulio Turcato (Mantova 1912 - Rome 1995)
  - Untitled, 1960, oil and sand on canvas, 65 x 92 cm
  - Wooden Structure, 1985, painted wood, 333 x 120 x 120 cm
- Giuseppe Uncini (Fabriano, Ancona 1929 - Trevi, Perugia 2008)
  - Shadow and Two Parallelepipeds T. 6, 1973, concrete and laminated wood, 180 x 75 x 35 cm
  - Shadows of Two Parallelepipeds, 1975, concrete and laminated wood, 71 x 145 x 12 cm
- Franco Vaccari (Modena 1936)
  - Exhibition in Real Time no. 8: Homage to Ariosto, 1974, photographic print on paper, five elements, 60 x 80 cm each
- Sergio Vacchi (Castenaso di Bologna, Bologna 1925)
  - The Foundations, 1956, oil on canvas, 114.5 x 159 cm
- Valentino Vago (Barlassina, Monza e Brianza 1931)
  - E 174, 1973, acrylic on canvas, 81 x 65 cm
- Grazia Varisco (Milan 1937)
  - Variable Luminous Pattern R. VOD, 1962, neon, plastic, motor, 35 x 40 x 8 cm
- Emilio Vedova (Venice 1919 - 2006)
  - Disturbed Space T. 1, 1957, tempera grassa on canvas, 134.5 x 167.9 cm
  - Spain. Homage to Machado, 1959-1960, oil on canvas, 129.7 x 57.7 cm
- Luigi Veronesi (Milan 1908 - 1998)
  - Suspended no. 2, 1953, tempera on paper, 50 x 69.5 cm
- Franco Vimercati (Milan 1940 - 2001)
  - Tureens, 1983, photographic print on paper, six elements, 18.7 x 24 cm each
- Silvio Wolf (Milan 1952)
  - Green Light/Orthogonal, 1989, mixed media (cibachrome print, lead, zinc, plastic laminates), 97 x 151 x 4 cm
- William Xerra (Firenze 1937)
  - Stet, 1977, mixed media on temporary frame, 68 x 53 cm
- Gilberto Zorio (Andorno Micca, Biella 1944)
  - Beach, 1972, pencil, acrylic, tin foil on canvas-backed paper, 70 x 200 cm

== See also ==
- Art collections of Fondazione Cariplo
- List of largest art museums
