= Art collection of Fondazione Cariplo =

Artworks collection in Italy

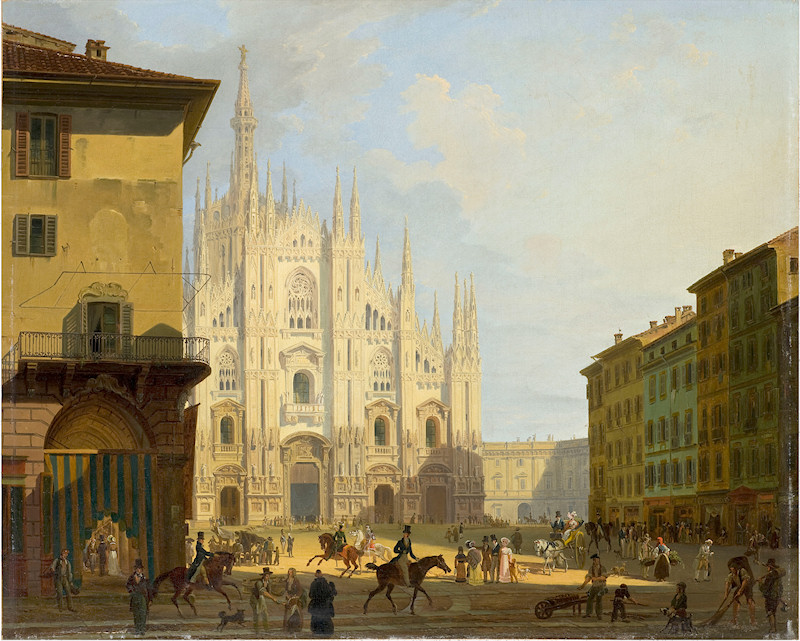
- Giovanni Migliara, View of piazza del Duomo in Milan (1819)

The art collections of Fondazione Cariplo are a gallery of artworks with a significant historical and artistic value owned by Fondazione Cariplo in Italy. It consists of 767 paintings, 116 sculptures, 51 objects and furnishings dating from the first century AD to the second half of the twentieth.

The collection includes examples of Late Antiquity stone sculpture, of Mediaeval wooden sculpture, and of Italian Renaissance and Baroque painting; its strength is in its collection of nineteenth-century Italian paintings, particularly from Lombardy.

== Selected collection highlights ==
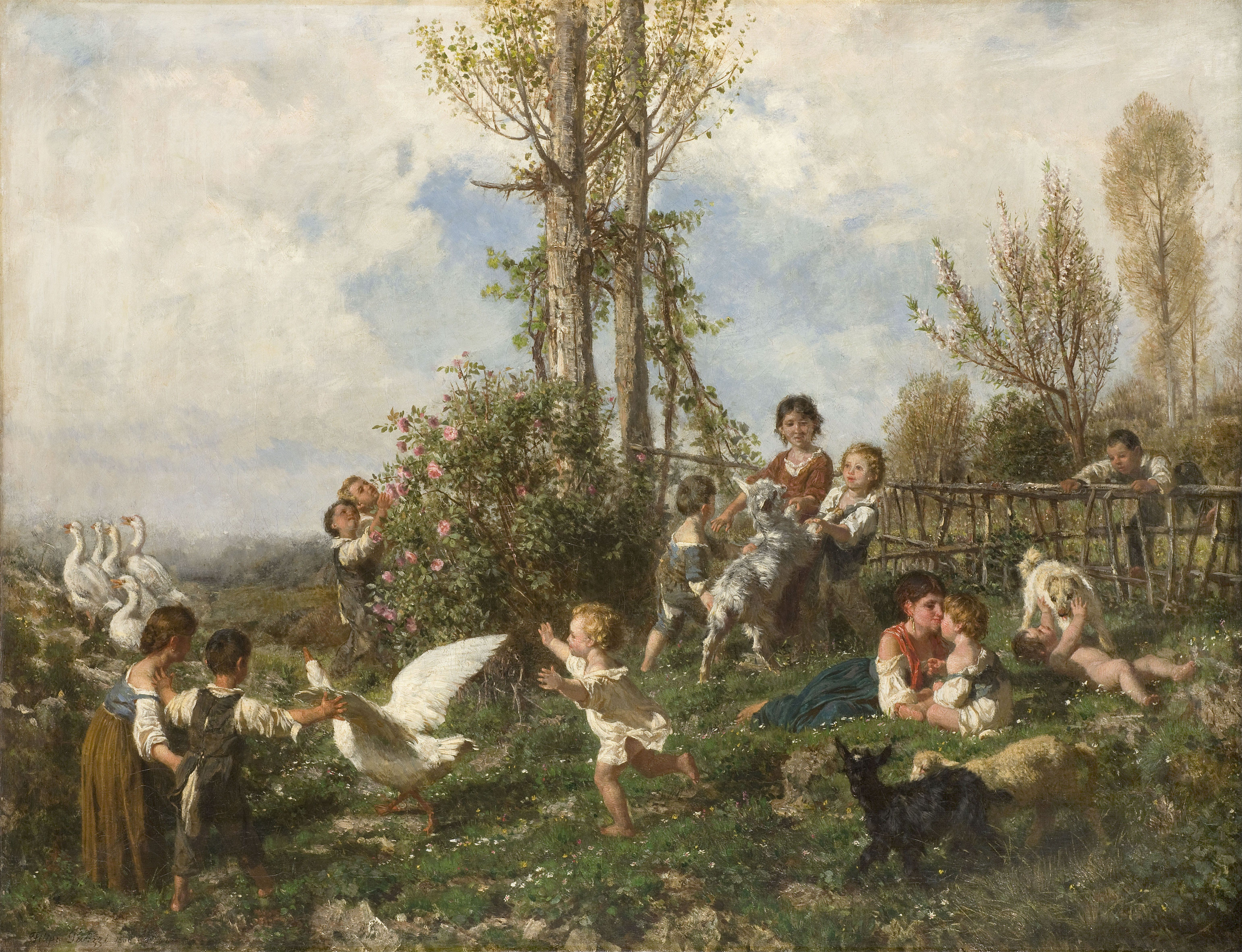
Filippo Palizzi

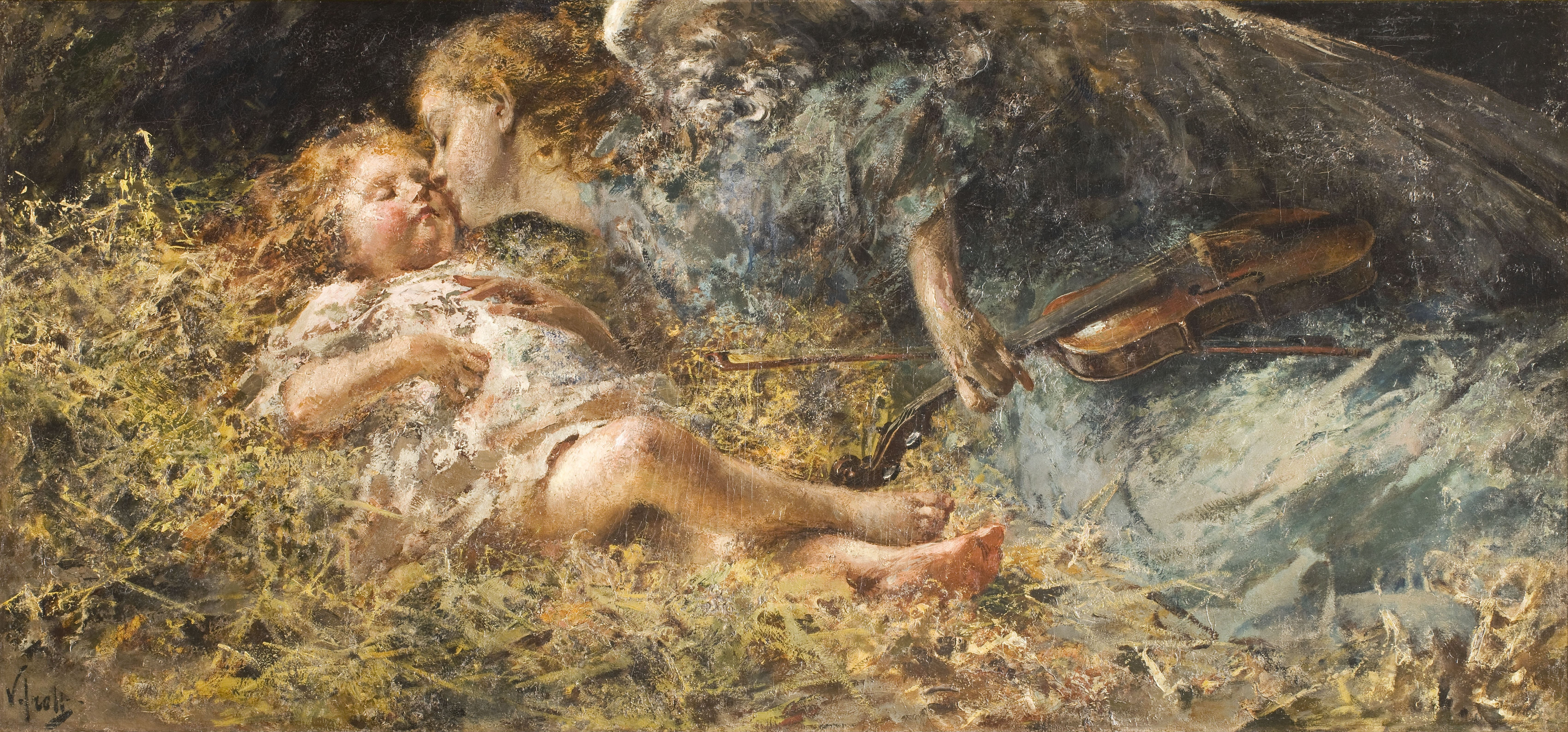
Vincenzo Irolli

== History of the collections ==
The Cariplo bank (Savings Bank of the Lombardy Provinces) began to form the collection in 1923, originally through the acquisition of paintings and sculptures by contemporary artists exhibited in Milan with the aim to promote and encourage the arts in Lombardy. This policy continued after the Second World War, and increased with annual purchases of the Permanente company and exhibitions of religious art at the Angelicum. Since the late 1960s, it began to make purchases at sales held by auction houses. The works of Istituto Bancario Italiano were added to its collection. It includes a portrait gallery of former Cariplo presidents. After the passage of the Amato Law donations increased, including the Manara Grolle, Marcenaro legacy. Completing the collection of presidential portraits at the Cariplo, are paintings and sculptures of the nineteenth and twentieth century depicting many of the protagonists of the modern Italian economy.

In 2011 as part of the Share Your Knowledge project, the collection was made available under CC BY-SA, including low-resolution images.

== Gallerie di Piazza Scala ==
The Gallerie di Piazza Scala, a museum of nineteenth-century art, opened in Milan in 2011. It holds almost two hundred artworks from the Cariplo collections and those of Intesa San Paolo, ranging from bas-reliefs by Antonio Canova to works by Umberto Boccioni.

== List of artists in the collections ==
A

- Vincenzo Abbati
- Mario Acerbi
- Francesco Albotto
- Attilio Alfieri
- Luca Alinari
- Aldo Andreani
- Antonianos di Afrodisia
- Fausto Antonioli
- Emanuele Appendini
- Andrea Appiani
- Ercole Salvatore Aprigliano
- Francesco Filippo Arata
- Silvestro Ariscola

B

- Giovanni Balansino
- Salvatore Balsamo
- Achille Barbaro
- Alessandro Barbieri
- Contardo Barbieri
- Donato Barcaglia
- Ugo Vittore Bartolini
- Ferruccio Baruffi
- Jacopo Bassano (bottega di)
- Francesco Battaglioli
- Ernesto Bazzaro
- Leonardo Bazzaro
- Mario Bazzi
- Alberto Bazzoni
- Giorgio Belloni
- Simon Benetton
- Nicolas Berchem
- Cirillo Bertazzoli
- Giorgina Bertolucci Di Vecchio
- Oreste Betti
- Mario Bettinelli
- Bartolomeo Bezzi
- Amedeo Bianchi
- Mosè Bianchi
- Giuseppe Biasi
- Mario Biazzi
- Mario Biglioli
- Osvaldo Bignami
- Adriana Bisi Fabbri
- Fulvia Bisi
- Luigi Bisi
- Giovanni Boldini
- Arturo Bonfanti
- Leonardo Borgese
- Pompeo Borra
- Odoardo Borrani
- Timo Bortolotti
- Carlo Bozzi
- Giovanni Brancaccio
- Gastone Breddo
- Cesare Breveglieri
- Luigi Brignoli
- Remo Brindisi
- Anselmo Bucci
- Vittorio Bussolino

C

- Guido Cadorin
- Alberto Caligiani
- Ercole Calvi
- Pompeo Calvi
- Gianfranco Campestrini
- Carlo Canella
- Giuseppe Canella
- Pietro Canonica
- Antonio Canova
- Innocente Cantinotti
- Giovanni Bernardo Carbone
- Filippo Carcano
- Francesco Carini
- Luca Carlevarijs
- Giovanni Carnovali
- Aldo Carpi
- Guido Carrer
- Rosalba Carriera
- Michele Cascella
- Daphne Casorati Maugham
- Giannino Castiglioni
- Vincenzo Catena (bottega di)
- Achille Cattaneo
- Luigi Cauda
- Ludovico Cavaleri
- Attilio Cavallini
- Carlo Ceresa
- Giuseppe Cerrina
- Gaetano Chierici
- Beppe Ciardi
- Emma Ciardi
- Guglielmo Ciardi
- Antonio Cifrondi
- Virginio Ciminaghi
- Pier Francesco Cittadini
- Viviano Codazzi
- Florin Codre
- Enrico Coleman
- Augusto Colombo
- Giovanni Colombo (painter)
- Adone Comboni
- Gigi Comolli
- Luigi Conconi
- Silvio Consadori
- Raffaello Consortini
- Aldo Conti
- Alfonso Corradi
- Salvatore Corvaya
- Gino Cosentino
- Ettore Cosomati
- Giovanni Costa
- Jacques Courtois
- Giuseppe Maria Crespi
- Carlo Cressini
- Luigi Crippa

D

- Edoardo Dalbono
- Angelo Dall'Oca Bianca
- Giovanni Stefano Danedi
- Arturo Dazzi
- Sebastiano De Albertis
- Cristoforo De Amicis
- Domenico De Bernardi
- Nicolas De Corsi
- Fernando De Filippi
- Raffaele De Grada
- Andrea De Lione
- Pedro De Mena
- Filippo De Pisis
- Francesco De Rocchi
- Jules Jean-Baptiste Dehaussy
- Mario Della Foglia
- Lorenzo Delleani
- Michele Desubleo
- Beppe Devalle
- Filippo Teodoro di Liagno
- Alfredo Di Romagna
- Adriano Di Spilimbergo
- Antonio Discovolo
- Gaspare Diziani
- Carlo Donelli
- Antonio Donghi
- Leonardo Dudreville
- Gaspard Dughet

E

- Giuseppe Elena
- Giovanni Antonio Emanueli

F

- Fabio Fabbi
- Guido Farina
- Gennaro Favai
- Giacomo Favretto
- Charles Fayod
- Gino Federici
- Adolfo Feragutti Visconti
- Gregorio Fernandez
- Arturo Ferrari
- Carlo Ferrari
- Giuseppe Ferrata
- Tano Festa
- Francesco Filippini
- Luigi Filocamo
- Napoleone Giovanni Fiumi
- Alessandro Focosi
- Pietro Foglia
- Enrico Fonda
- Achille Formis
- Piero Fornasetti
- Andrea Fossombrone
- Innocenzo Fraccaroli
- Pietro Fragiacomo
- Felicita Frai
- Umberto Franzosi
- Vittore Frattini
- Ernst Freiesleben
- Émile Friant
- Donato Frisia
- Achille Funi

G

- Giacomo Gandi
- Vincenzo Gemito
- Franco Gentilini
- Melchiorre Gherardini
- Eugenio Gignous
- Lorenzo Gignous
- Luigi Gioli
- Luca Giordano
- Bartolomeo Giuliano
- Piero Giunni
- Francesco Gnecchi
- Emilio Gola
- Marco Gozzi
- Giovanni Grande
- Nicola Grassi
- Ottavio Grolla
- Giannino Grossi
- Giacomo Grosso
- Orazio Costante Grossoni
- Kriss Guenzati Dubini
- Giuseppe Guerreschi
- Sergio Guerreschi
- Virgilio Guidi
- Bartolomeo Guidobono
- Renato Guttuso
- Beppe Guzzi

H

- Francesco Hayez

I

- Domenico Induno
- Gerolamo Induno
- Angelo Inganni
- Vincenzo Irolli

J

- Pio Joris
- Italo Josz

K

- Ivan Karpoff
- Hermann Kern

L

- Dino Lanaro
- Andrea Lanzani
- Cesare Laurenti
- Giovanni Battista Lelli
- Umberto Lilloni
- Fausto Locatelli
- Raffaello Locatelli
- Francesco Lojacono
- Emilio Longoni
- Alessandro Lupo

M

- Maestro dei fiori guardeschi
- Cesare Maggi
- Giuseppe Maggiolini
- Emilio Magistretti
- Giovanni Maimeri
- Vincenzo Malò
- Gianfranco Manara
- Antonio Mancini
- Carlo Mancini
- Francesco Mancini (1830–1905)
- Enrico Manfrini
- Luigi Mantovani
- Giuseppe Manzone
- Giacomo Manzù
- Anacleto Margotti
- Pompeo Mariani
- Piero Martina
- Arturo Martini
- Carlo Martini
- Guido Marussig
- Ennio Marzano
- Arrigo Renato Marzola
- Giuseppe Mascarini
- Aldo Mazza
- Giuseppe Menato
- Ilario Mercanti
- Francesco Messina
- Francesco Paolo Michetti
- Giovanni Migliara
- Vincenzo Migliaro
- Alessandro Milesi
- Arrigo Minerbi
- Federico Moja
- Giuseppe Molteni
- Giuseppe Montanari
- Cesare Monti
- Umberto Montini
- Angelo Morbelli
- Foggia Mario Moretti
- Antonio Moretti
- Gino Moro
- Marzio Moro
- Cesarina Mottironi
- Gabriele Mucchi
- Pieter Mulier
- Giulio Vito Musitelli

N

- Carlo Nangeroni
- Giovanna Nascimbene Tallone
- Renato Natali
- Gerolamo Navarra
- Mario Nigro
- Charles Francois Nivard
- Plinio Nomellini
- Luigi Nono
- Pietro Novelli
- Giuseppe Novello

O

- Augusto Ortolani
- Pasquale Ottino

P

- Carlo Paganini
- Eleuterio Pagliano
- Giuseppe Palanti
- Filippo Palizzi
- Giuseppe Palizzi
- Laura Panno
- Gilda Pansiotti Cambon D'Amico
- Pierluigi Parzini
- Arturo Pasetto
- Antonio Pasinetti
- Lazzaro Pasini
- Ezio Pastorio
- Angelo Pavan
- Riccardo Pellegrini
- Ugo Piatti
- Antonio Piccinni
- Orazio Pigato
- Ernesto Pirovano
- Carlo Pizzi
- Lodovico Pogliaghi
- Silvio Poma
- Giuseppe Ponga
- Giacomo Antonio Ponsonelli
- Giuseppe Porta (painter 1807)
- Walter Pozzi
- Luigi Prada
- Attilio Pratella
- Carlo Preda
- Luigi Premazzi
- Gaetano Previati
- Giulio Cesare Procaccini
- Scipione Pulzone

Q

- Gianni Quaglio
- Luigi Querena

R

- Ambrogio Raffele
- Aldo Raimondi
- Camillo Rapetti
- Richard Reinagle Ramsay
- Gian Piero Restellini
- Leonardo Roda
- Alonzo Rodriguez
- Pietro Ronzoni
- Johann Heinrich Roos
- Ottone Rosai
- Mario Rossello
- Attilio Rossi
- Giulio Rossi
- Luigi Rossi
- Vanni Rossi
- Carlo Fortunato Rosti
- Francesco Rustici
- Teodolinda Sabaino Migliara

S

- Paolo Sala
- Roberto Sambonet
- Salvatore Saponaro
- Francesco Sartorelli
- Giulio Aristide Sartorio
- Aligi Sassu
- Ferruccio Scattola
- Gregorio Sciltian
- Alfredo Scocchera
- Lello Scorzelli
- Giovanni Segantini
- Pompilio Seveso
- Pacifico Sidoli
- Telemaco Signorini
- Giuseppe Simonelli
- Francesco Simonini
- Mario Sironi
- Ardengo Soffici
- Giuseppe Solenghi
- Emilio Sommariva
- Giovanni Sottocornola
- Armando Spadini
- Francesco Speranza
- Ilario Spolverini
- Nino Springolo
- Romano Stefanelli
- Ottavio Steffenini
- Luigi Stracciari

T

- Remo Taccani
- Clemente Tafuri
- Carlo Costantino Tagliabue
- Cesare Tallone
- Guido Tallone
- Orfeo Tamburi
- Giovanni Battista Tiepolo
- Sirio Tofanari
- Fiorenzo Tomea
- Adolfo Tommasi
- Ludovico Tommasi
- Arturo Tosi
- Ernesto Treccani
- Angelo Trezzini
- Giulio Turcato

U

- Giuseppe Ugolini
- Stefano Ussi

V

- Bassano Vaccarini
- Francesco Valaperta
- Ludwig Valenta
- Simon Johannes van Douw
- Allaer Van Everdingen
- Gaspar Van Wittel
- Francesco Vanni
- Alessandro Varotari
- Vincenzo Vela
- Mario Vellani Marchi
- Gaspare Venturini
- Renato Vernizzi
- Giulio Cesare Vinzio
- Volterrano Volterrani

W

- Richard Wilson
- Teodoro Wolf Ferrari

X

- Ettore Ximenes

Z

- Luigi Zago
- Giuseppe Zais
- Lodovico Zambeletti
- Adelina Zandrino
- Vittore Zanetti Zilla
- Bartholomaeus Zeitblom
- Umberto Ziveri
- Carlo Zocchi
- Guido Zuccaro
- Luigi Zuccoli

== See also ==
- Fondazione Cariplo
- Gallerie di Piazza Scala
- Google Arts & Culture
