= Rapetti =

Rapetti is an Italian surname. Notable people with the surname include:

- Camillo Rapetti (1859–1929), Italian painter
- Giulio Rapetti (born 1936), Italian music lyricist
- Tomas Rapetti (born 2005), Argentine rugby union player
