= Bettinelli =

Bettinelli is a surname. Notable people with the surname include:

- Andrea Bettinelli (born 1978), Italian high jumper
- Bruno Bettinelli (1913–2004), Italian composer
- Marcus Bettinelli (born 1992), English football player
- Mario Bettinelli (1880–1953), Italian painter
- Matt Bettinelli-Olpin (born 1978), American actor
- Saverio Bettinelli (1718–1808) Italian Jesuit writer
