= Manueli =

Manueli may refer to:

- Manueli Tulo (born 1990), Fijian weightlifter
- Paul Manueli, former Commander of the Royal Fiji Military Forces
- Cernaysia manueli, commonly known as Manuel's skink, is a species of lizard in the subfamily Scincinae of the family Scincidae
- Chalcides manueli, commonly known as Manuel's skink, is a species of lizard in the subfamily Scincinae of the family Scincidae
- Pholcus manueli, a species of cellar spider in the family Pholcidae

== See also ==
- Emanueli
