= Foglia (disambiguation) =

Foglia may refer to:

- Foglia, a river in the Marche region of Italy
- Montecalvo in Foglia, a municipality in the Marche region of Italy
- 13147 Foglia, a main-belt asteroid

== People ==
- Alejandro Foglia
- Adriano Foglia
- Andrea Foglia
- Joe Foglia
- Leonard Foglia
- Mario Foglia
- Pietro Foglia
