= Sartorelli =

Sartorelli is an Italian surname that may refer to the following notable people:

- Francesco Sartorelli (1856–1939), Italian painter
- Pierluigi Sartorelli (1912–1996), Italian prelate of the Catholic Church
- Sergio Sartorelli (1928–2009), Italian automotive designer and engineer
