= Ludovico Cavaleri =

Italian painter (1867 – 1942)

Ludovico Cavaleri (1867–1942) was an Italian painter.

== Biography ==
He was born in Milan. A self-taught member of the school of Lombard Naturalism in its last stages, Cavalieri abandoned his medical studies in 1888 to devote himself exclusively to painting. Having begun to specialise in seascapes under the influence of his contemporaries Pompeo Mariani and Giorgio Belloni in 1890, he later adopted the anti-naturalistic approach characteristic of the turn of the century, possibly as a result of his friendship with the Symbolist poet Gian Pietro Lucini. In addition to his large output of paintings, he also worked as an illustrator and commercial artist. A regular participant in the major exhibitions, he achieved considerable success on the art market and a number of official awards, including a gold medal at the International Exhibition of Munich in 1902. The prestigious Galleria Pesaro hosted two solo shows of the artist’s work, one in 1918 and the other in 1935. He died in Cuvio, Varese, in 1942.

== Other projects ==
Media related to Ludovico Cavaleri at Wikimedia Commons
