= Antonio Pasinetti =

Italian painter (1863–1940)

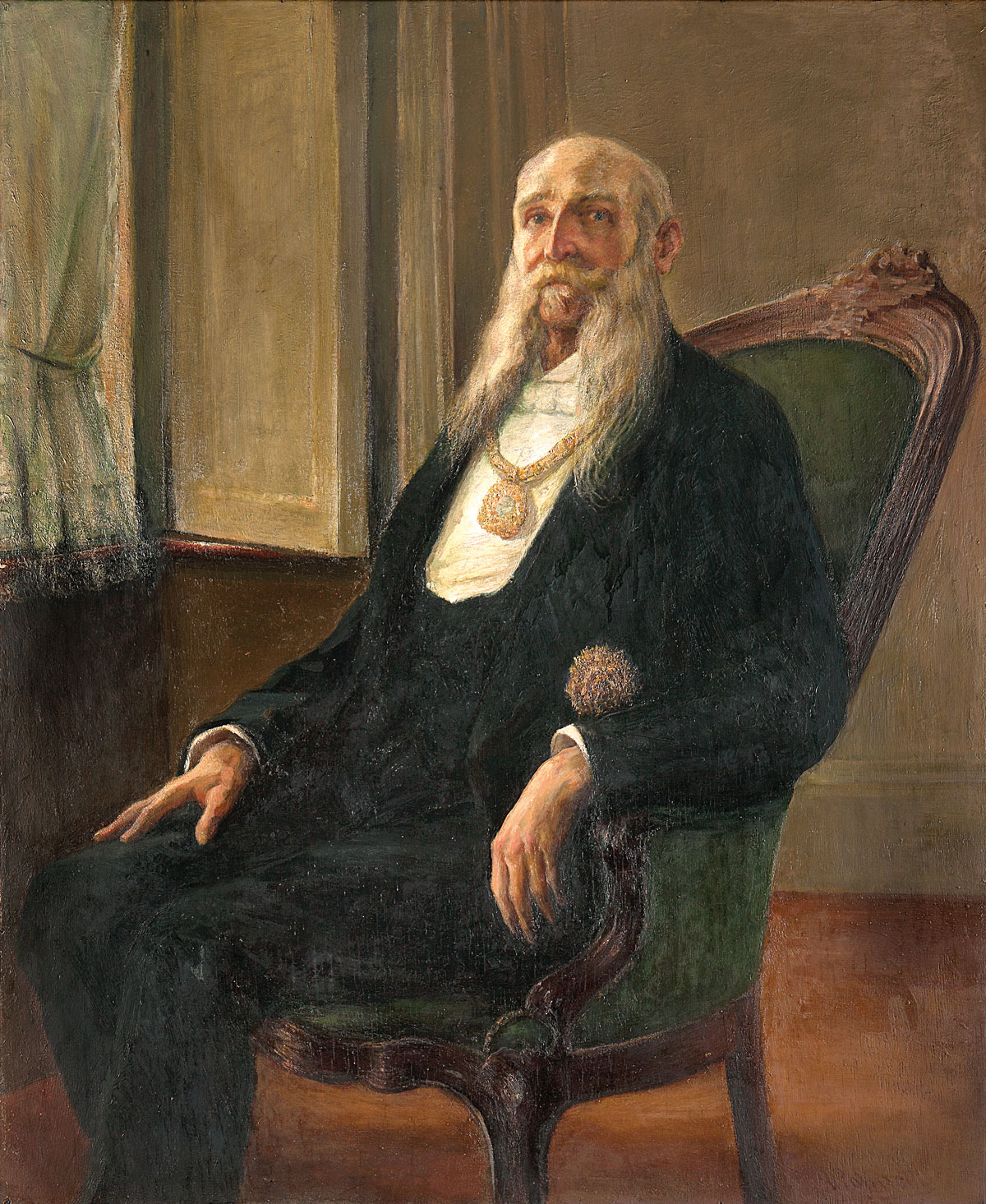
Ritratto dell'avvocato Giuseppe Marcora, 1924 (Art collections of Fondazione Cariplo)

Antonio Pasinetti (Montichiari, Brescia, 1863 – Milan, 1940) was an Italian painter.

== Biography ==
Of humble origin, Pasinetti served his apprenticeship with the local painter Luigi Campini in Brescia. After attending the Moretto school there, he moved to Milan in 1880 and enrolled at the Brera Academy, where he graduated in drawing. Dissatisfaction with the academic teaching may have been the reason why he abandoned his studies and moved to Verona to attend the school of the painter Napoleone Nani, a practitioner of the new naturalistic approach. He travelled through northern Italy and specialized in landscape and portrait painting until 1889, when he settled definitively in Milan. There he came into contact with the leading figures of the Lombard school of naturalism and shared a studio on Via Solferino with Paolo Troubetzkoy. He was established by the end of the 20th century as a portrait painter with a middle-class clientele in Lombardy while continuing to paint landscapes during his frequent travels and stays in Italy and other countries, with a particular preference for Venice. His strongly naturalistic painting took a new course around 1925 as a result of contact with the Novecento Italiano movement.

Pasinetti took part in the major national and international exhibitions from 1884 on. Giovanni Treccani degli Alfieri organized a show of his work in Milan in 1942, two years after his death.

== Bibliography ==
- Elena Lissoni, Antonio Pasinetti, online catalogue Artgate by Fondazione Cariplo, 2010, CC BY-SA (source for the first revision of this article).
