= Marco Gozzi =

Italian painter (1759–1839)

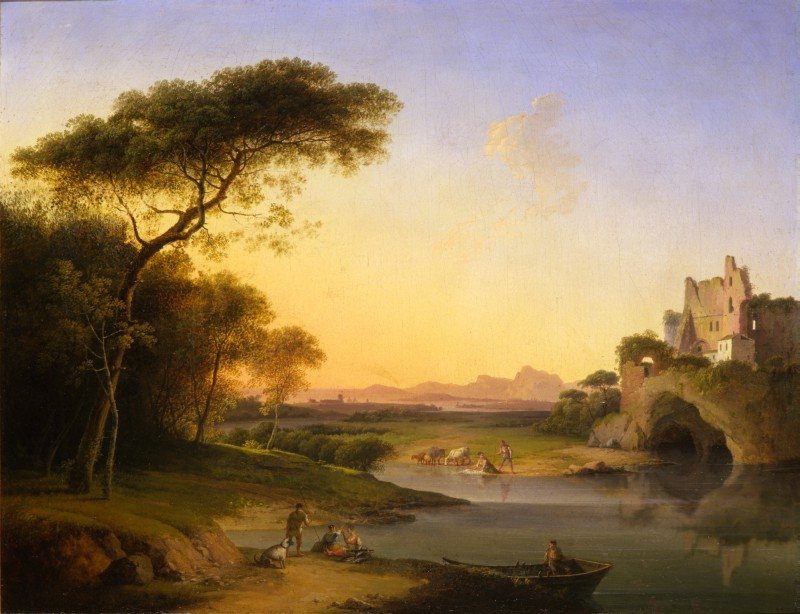
Paesaggio con figure in riva al fiume Adda, ca. 1810 (Art collections of Fondazione Cariplo)

Marco Gozzi (1759–1839) was an Italian landscape art painter.

== Biography ==
He was born in San Giovanni Bianco in Val Bembrana, Province of Bergamo. He was probably trained under the guidance of the painter Corneo. Gozzi worked initially in a broad range of fields including portraiture, religious subjects and decorative frescoes executed in accordance with the Veneto tradition, then still predominant in the region of Bergamo.

There is no record of his activity as a landscape painter until 1807, when he signed a contract with Count De Breme, then Minister of the Interior of the Kingdom of Italy, for the execution of four views of Lombardy a year in return for a government pension. His painting was transitional: he still aimed to depict an imaginary and romantic Arcadian and had not yet moved to attempt topographical depictions of the rustic landscape.

Even by the 1860s, Locatelli was to note this reactionary attachment to the style of prior centuries; he viewed Gozzi as the "last scion of the great idealist school of Poussin and Lorraine, now sagging and exhausted".

The ministerial contract for painting was renewed in 1812 and his regular participation in the annual Brera exhibitions began the following year. While he never held the chair in landscape at the Academy of Brera, he was elected an honorary member in 1829 and qualified as a landscape painter in 1832.

Gozzi died in Milan in 1839.

== Other projects ==
Media related to Marco Gozzi at Wikimedia Commons
