= Renato Vernizzi =

Italian painter

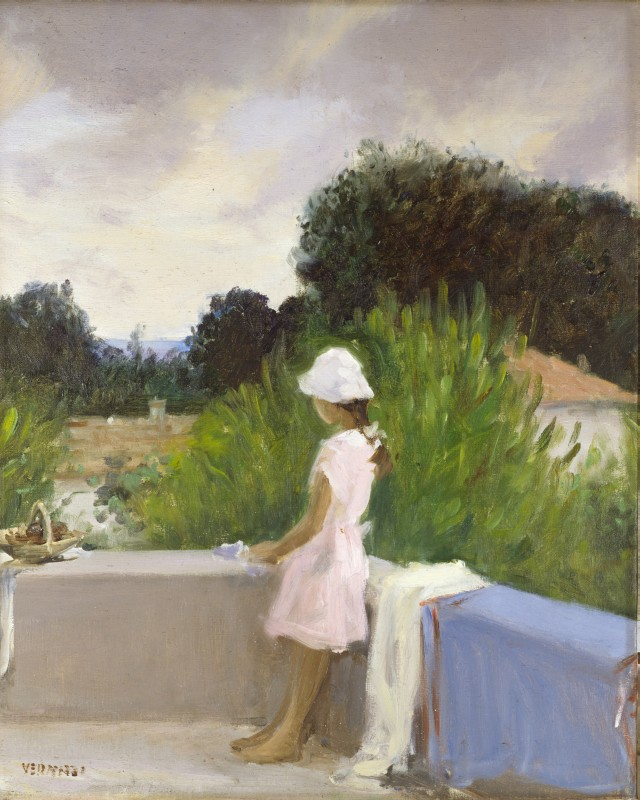
La fanciulla (Art collections of Fondazione Cariplo)

Renato Vernizzi (1 July 1904 – 18 January 1972) was an Italian painter.

== Biography ==
Vernizzi was born in Parma, Italy. He enrolled at the Parma Academy of Fine Arts in 1922. Having moved to Milan in 1927, he came into contact with the painting of the Novecento Italiano group, which he soon abandoned in favour of Chiarismo. Participation in the Settimana dell’Arte exhibition organised by the newspaper L'Ambrosiano in 1934 brought him to the attention of critics and opened a period of success that reached its climax with the 20th Esposizione Internazionale d’Arte della Città di Venezia in 1936. A work exhibited at the Seconda Provinciale del Sindacato Fascista di Belle Arti was bought by the Galleria d’Arte Moderna, Milan, in 1940 and the artist was awarded the Bergamo Prize in 1941. He focused on portraits and works of an intimist nature after World War II and joined the Cenacolo di Via Bagutta. He started teaching at the Parma Institute of Art in 1955.

== Other projects ==
Media related to Renato Vernizzi at Wikimedia Commons
