= Mario Acerbi (painter) =

Italian painter (1887–1982)

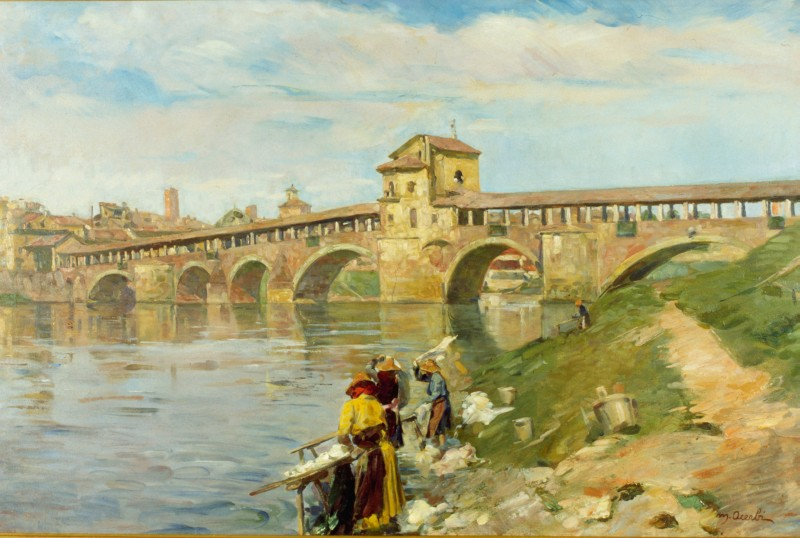
Il Ponte Vecchio con lavandaie, 1925–30 (Art collections of Fondazione Cariplo)

Mario Acerbi (1887–1982) was an Italian painter.

== Biography ==
Acerbi was born in Milan. He attended the municipal school of painting in Pavia from 1900 to 1909 as a pupil of Carlo Sara, Romeo Borgognoni and Giorgio Kienerk, and was awarded the Lauzi Prize in 1907 and the Frank Prize (subsequently revoked due to a procedural error) in 1910. The artist's father Ezechiele, a well-known landscape painter and leading figure in the artistic circles of Pavia, played a crucial part in his training as a naturalistic painter. Acerbi took part in exhibitions in Turin and Milan from 1908 with a repertoire of landscapes, portraits and flower paintings based on his father's more commercially successful models. Acerbi distinguished himself as a portrait painter with a clientele in Milan and Pavia and received official commissions for history paintings and religious frescoes from various bodies in the Lombardy region. He died in Pavia.

== Bibliography ==
- Elena Lissoni, Mario Acerbi, online catalogue Artgate by Fondazione Cariplo, 2010, CC BY-SA (source for the first revision of this article).
