= Luigi Mantovani =

Italian painter (1880–1957)

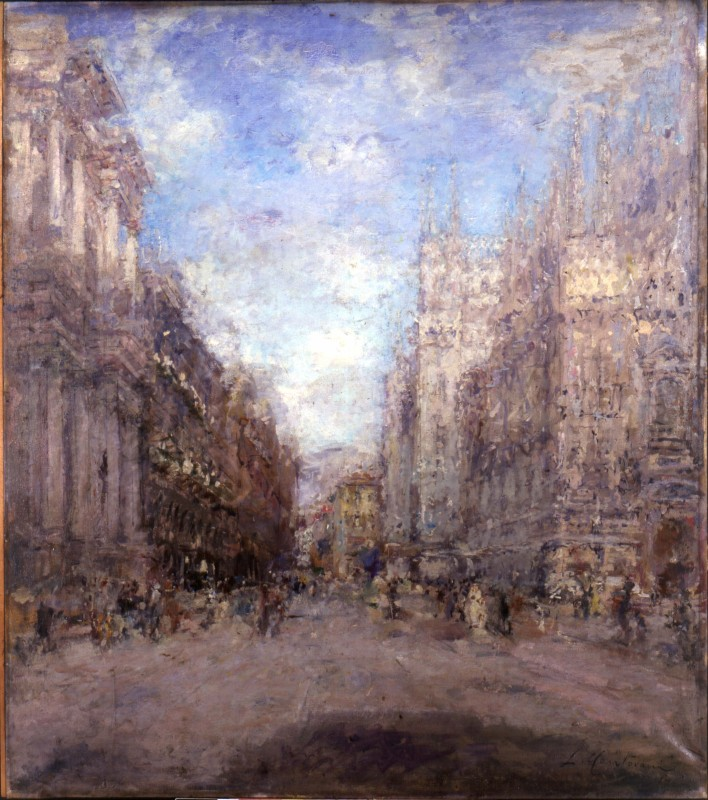
Corso Vittorio Emanuele a Milano, 1924 (Art collections of Fondazione Cariplo)

Luigi Mantovani (Milan, 1880 – Milan, 1957) was an Italian painter.

== Biography ==
Encouraged in his artistic studies by his father Giuseppe, who was an engraver, he enrolled at the Brera Academy in 1896 and became a pupil of Giuseppe Mentessi, Vespasiano Bignami and Cesare Tallone.

He made his debut at the 4th Esposizione Triennale di Brera in 1900 with two landscape studies and began to participate regularly in the exhibitions held at the Famiglia Artistica Milanese and the Società per le Belle Arti ed Esposizione Permanente, becoming established on the art scene in 1906 through his participation in the Esposizione Internazionale di Milano. From the 1920s on, he distinguished himself as a protagonist in the Milanese cultural coteries, being one of the leading lights of the Associazione degli Acquarellisti Lombardi and of the Famiglia Artistica Milanese, and he was awarded a gold medal at the exhibition devoted to the Lombard landscape in 1926. From the outset, his cityscapes and landscapes are characterised by broken brushstrokes and a light, transparent palette, which was to become his signature style. In the 1940s, when he took up painting again after the long hiatus due to World War II, he reprised his repertoire of Milanese and Venetian views, which had now become repetitive and conventional, using a looser and more fluid pictorial technique.

== Bibliography ==
- Elena Lissoni, Luigi Mantovani, online catalogue Artgate by Fondazione Cariplo, 2010, CC BY-SA (source for the first revision of this article).

== Other projects ==
Media related to Luigi Mantovani at Wikimedia Commons
