= Orazio Costante Grossoni =

Italian sculptor

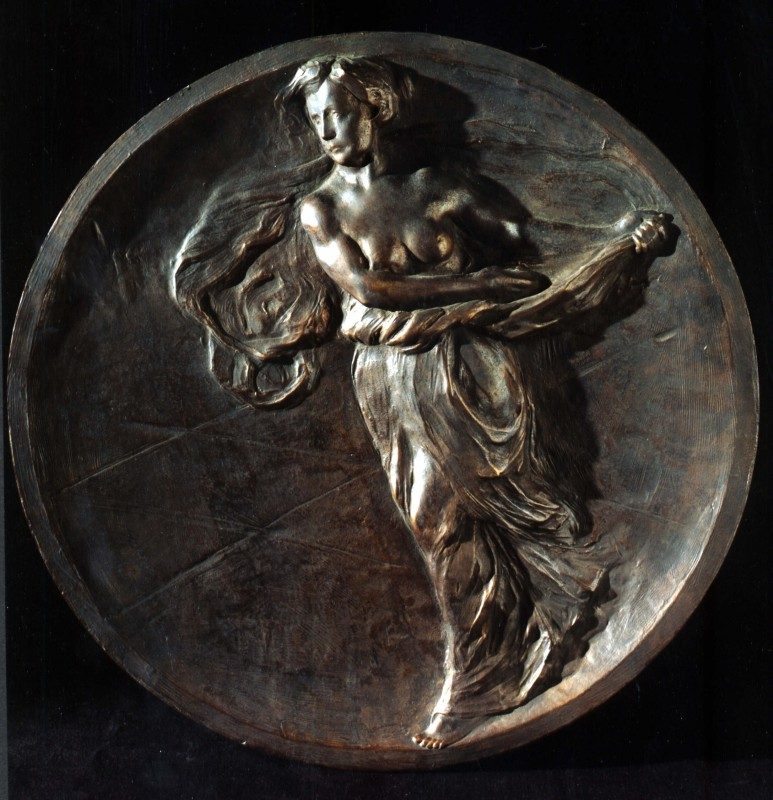
La seminatrice (Art collections of Fondazione Cariplo)

Orazio Costante Grossoni (Milan, 1867–1952) was an Italian sculptor.

== Biography ==
Grossoni studied at the Brera Academy of Fine Arts in Milan with Raffaele Casnedi and Ambrogio Borghi and worked in the studio of the sculptor Ernesto Bazzaro. He exhibited portraits and genre works at the first three editions of the Milan Triennale, winning the Fumagalli Prize in 1894. He also took part in the major events at the national and international level, including the Turin (1898) and Milan (1906) exhibitions as well as the Universal Exhibition of 1900 in Paris, where he was awarded a silver medal. The funerary sculpture for which he became known and esteemed in the early years of the 20th century includes the Bocconi (1901–14) and Sacchetti (1921) tombs and the Antonio Ascari monument (1928) in the Cimitero Monumentale in Milan. He also produced models for medals and worked for the building commissioners of Milan Cathedral from 1936 to 1939.

== Other projects ==
Media related to Orazio Costante Grossoni at Wikimedia Commons
