= Emanueli =

Emanueli is a surname. Notable people with the surname include:

- Giovanni Antonio Emanueli (1816–1894), Italian painter
- Luigi Emanueli (1883–1959), Italian engineer

== See also ==
- Liopropoma emanueli (or Cape Verde basslet), a species of basslet in the family Serranidae
