= Lazzaro Pasini =

Italian painter (1861–1949)

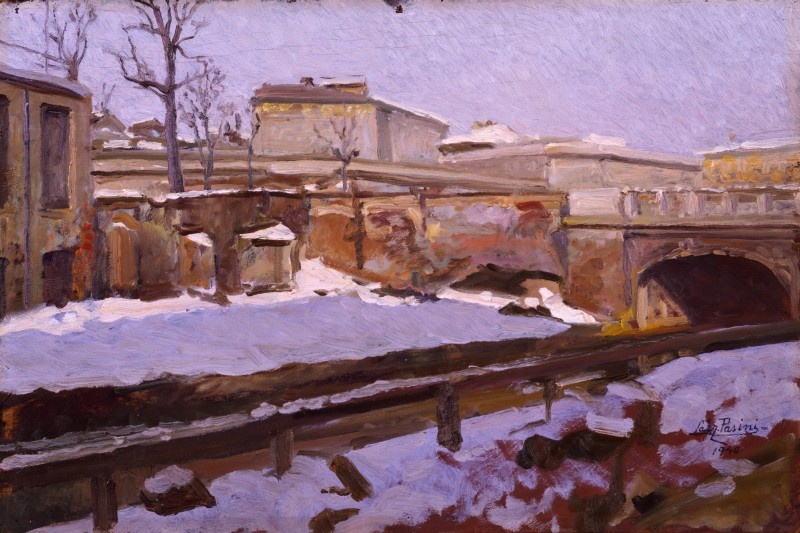
Il tombone di San Marco, 1940 (Art collections of Fondazione Cariplo)

Lazzaro Pasini (1861–1949) was an Italian painter, mainly of landscapes, but also some genre works.

== Biography ==
A pupil of engraver Romualdo Belloli in Reggio Emilia, the city of his birth, Lazzaro Pasini moved to Florence after obtaining a scholarship to study at the Academy. He frequented Giovanni Fattori’s studio and, attracted by macchia style of painting, he devoted himself to executing landscapes of the Tuscan countryside from life. In 1884, he made his debut at the National Exposition of Turin with a genre scene based on a social theme. Similar themes became a constant feature of his work following his move to Milan in 1886, where he came into contact with exponents of Lombard Naturalism. At the beginning of the 20th century he became interested in the technique of separating colors to achieve effects of heightened luminism in works of a religious nature and in his first Lombard views, which won him the gold medal from the Ministry of Education in 1918. His mature works were devoted mainly to landscape painting, with a return to a late 19th-century naturalistic language. He died in Milan in 1949.

== Other projects ==
Media related to Lazzaro Pasini at Wikimedia Commons
