= Donato Barcaglia =

Italian sculptor (1849–1930)

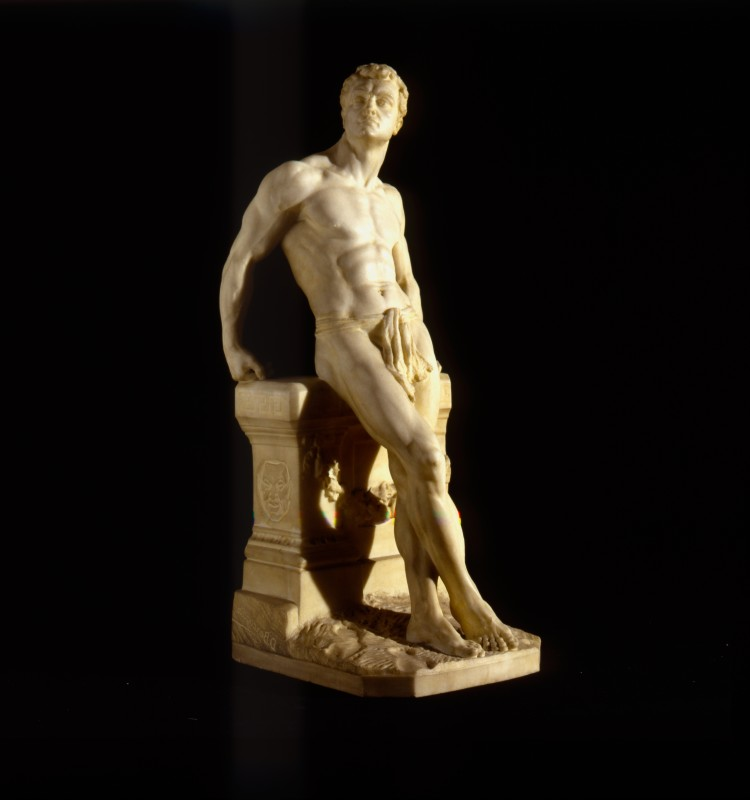
Atleta, 1898-1905 (Art collections of Fondazione Cariplo)

Donato Barcaglia (Pavia, 1 December 1849 – Rome, 1930) was an Italian sculptor.

== Biography ==
He attended the courses of sculpture taught by Abbondio Sangiorgio at the Brera Academy in Milan. His first work at 17 years of age, was Il Vendemmiatore. Barcaglia established himself as a portraitist in the 1860s before devoting his energies in the following decade to genre sculpture, for which he achieved distinction at the international exhibitions held in Vienna in 1873 and Philadelphia in 1876. This later gave way to a more rigorous classical style both in public works and in the groups sculpted in the first two decades of the new century for tombs in the Cimitero Monumentale in Milan.

Among his works are:

- The First Visit
- The Butterfly
- The Hunter
- Soap Bubble
- Love Blinded, won Gold medal at Florentine Exhibition, sold for $68,500 in 1999 and for $167,300 in 2004.
- La Vergognosa, (Museum of Trieste)
- La Vita che lenta trattenere il Tempo, won a prize in 1876 Exhibition in Philadelphia, then London, Trieste, and Milan in 1881.
- The awakening of the senses, Peri e Cacicco, inspired by Guarany del Gomes
- Lo Spazzacamino

== Other projects ==
Media related to Donato Barcaglia at Wikimedia Commons
