= Vincenzo Abbati =

Italian painter

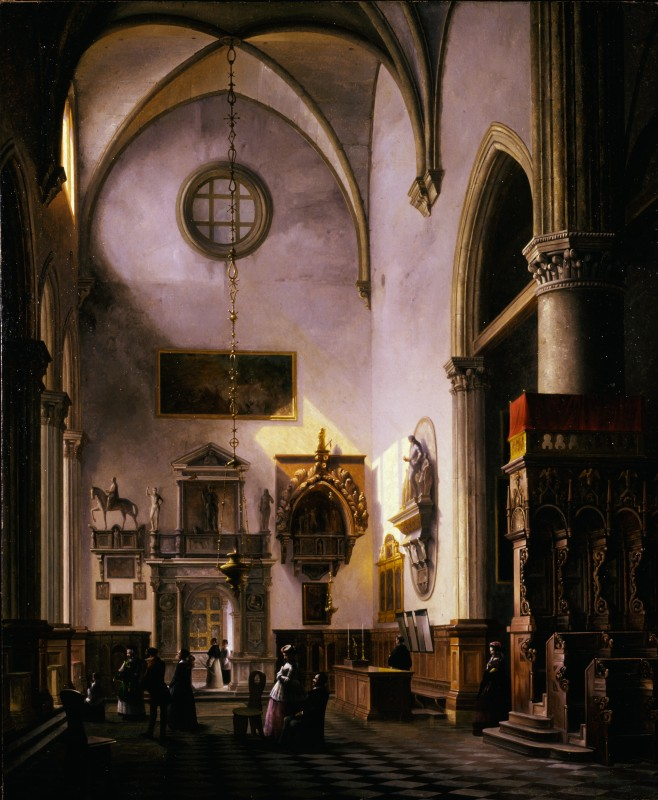
Veduta del monumento sepolcrale a Paolo Savelli nella chiesa di Santa Maria Gloriosa dei Frari a Venezia, 1857 (Art collections of Fondazione Cariplo)

Vincenzo Abbati (1803–1874?) was an Italian painter.

== Biography ==
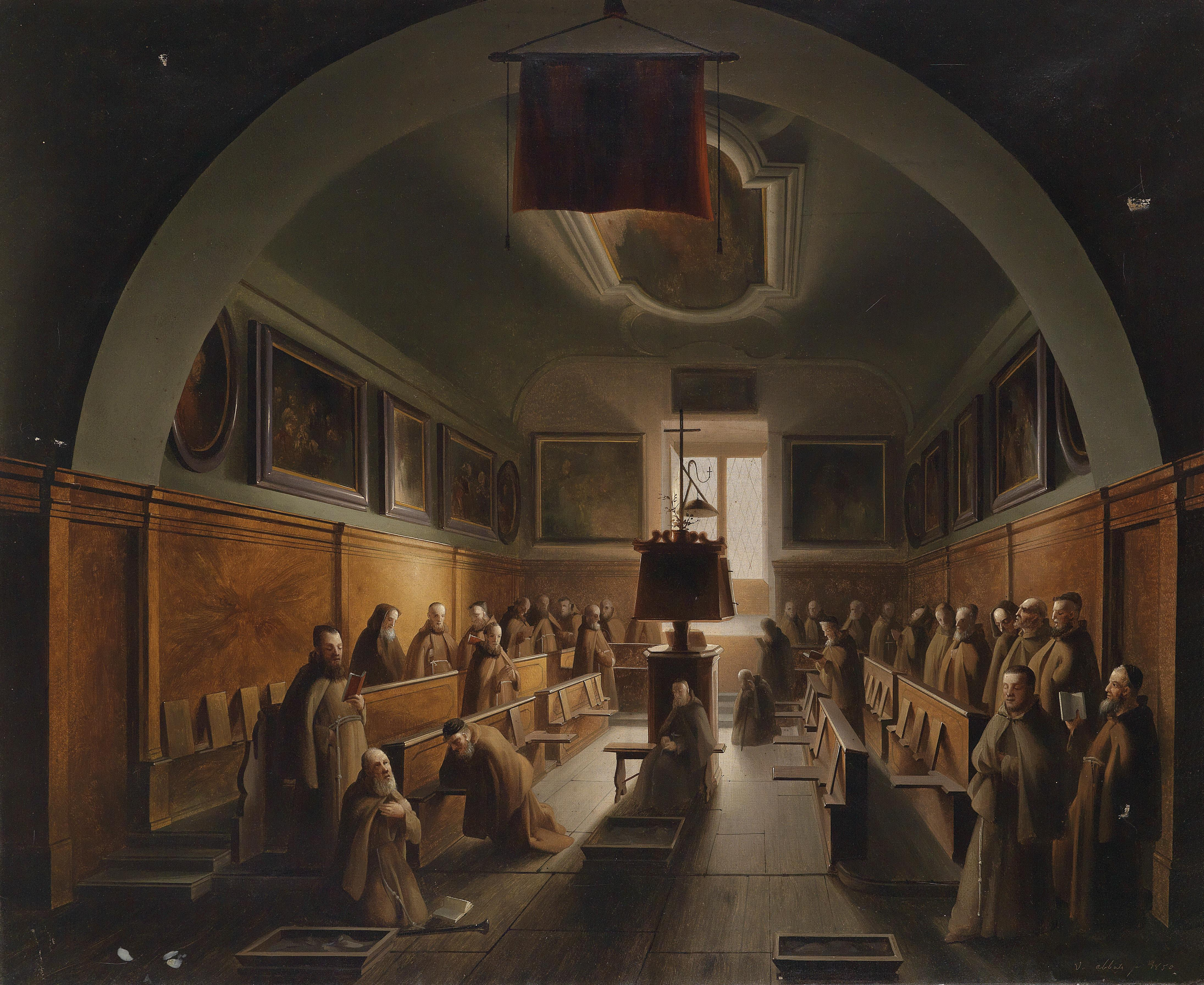
Carthusian Monks in Padua

Abbati was born to a French Napoleonic officer stationed in Naples. After attending the school of set design attached to the San Carlo Theatre in Naples, Abbati enrolled at the Royal Institute of Fine Arts in 1822 under Giuseppe Cammarano and remained there until 1826, the year of his debut in the first Bourbon exhibition. He then became court painter to Carolina, better known as the Duchess of Berry, the daughter of Francesco I, and moved in her entourage to Florence in 1842, Graz (Austria) in 1844, and finally Venice, where he took part in the annual exhibitions of the Academy of Fine Arts with perspective views. After returning to Naples in 1856 with his son Giuseppe, who was also a painter, he lived there on a permanent basis as from 1859. Recent studies suggest that the date of his death, traditionally given as 1866, could in fact be around 1874, at which time he was apparently involved in a lawsuit for debt.

== Other projects ==
Media related to Vincenzo Abbati at Wikimedia Commons
