= Mario Biazzi =

Italian painter (1880–1965)

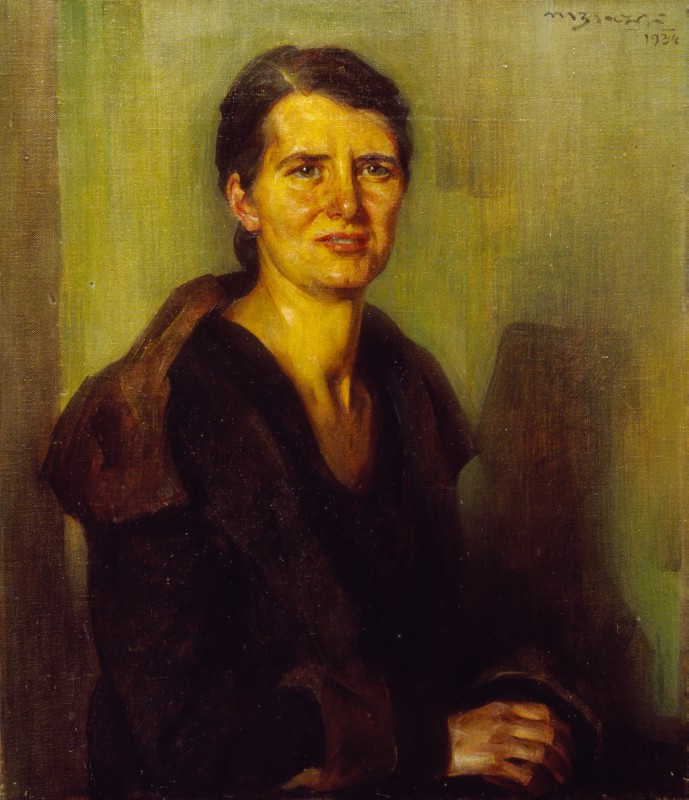
Ritratto di donna, 1934 (Art collections of Fondazione Cariplo)

Mario Biazzi (17 December 1880 – 11 February 1965) was an Italian painter.

He was born Natale Mario Biazzi in Castelverde, Cremona, Italy. Having attended the courses taught by Cesare Tallone at the Brera Academy in Milan (1899–1903), the Carrara Academy in Bergamo (1903–1905), and the Brera school of nude studies (1907–1909), Biazzi moved to Milan and came into contact with the Famiglia Artistica group, making himself known with portraits in the late style of the Scapigliatura movement. He made his debut at the 10th International Exhibition of Munich in 1910 and won a gold medal at the Esposizione d’Arte Moderna in Cremona the same year. He was in London from 1913 to 1915 but returned to Cremona during World War I and established himself as the leading portrait painter of the city's middle-class establishment. One of the founders of the local branches of the Famiglia Artistica and the Sindacato Interprovinciale Fascista di Belle Arti in the 1930s, Biazzi took part in the Cremona Prize competition in 1940 and 1942. His isolation after World War II was also due to political reasons. He died in 1965 in Cremona.

== Other projects ==
Media related to Mario Biazzi at Wikimedia Commons
