= Francesco Valaperta =

Italian painter (1836–1908)

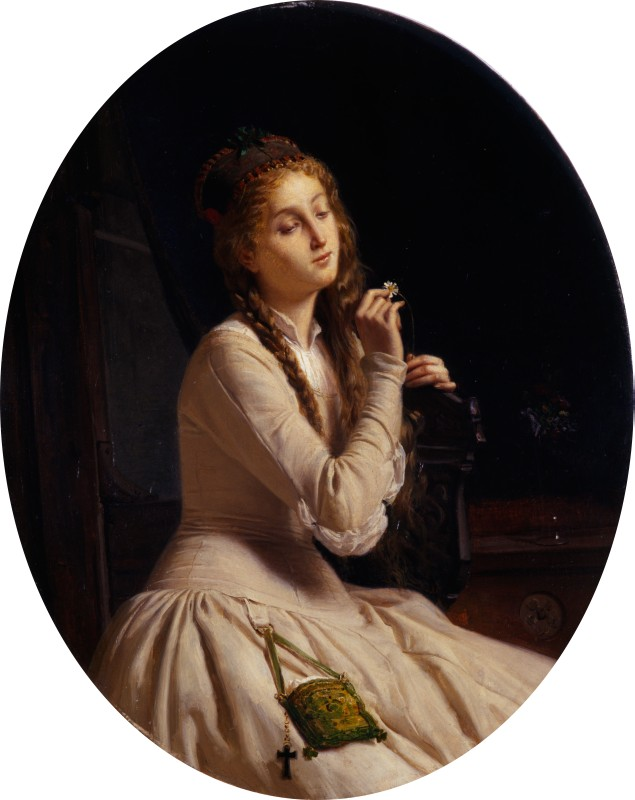
Mi ama o non mi ama o La malata d'amore (Art collections of Fondazione Cariplo)

Francesco Valaperta (Milan, 1836 – 1908) was an Italian painter.

== Biography ==
A pupil of Francesco Hayez at the Brera in Milan, Valaperta made his debut at the Academy’s annual exhibition in 1859 with a painting on a religious subject, followed in later years by works of a historical and literary character. Having adapted in the late 1860s to the great demand of contemporary collectors for subjects of a more intimate nature, he took part in the 2nd Esposizione Nazionale di Belle Arti at the Palazzo di Brera in 1872 and then went on to produce genre scenes in the manner of Gerolamo Induno and Eleuterio Pagliano. He received numerous commissions from important figures in Milan’s middle-class society and also from the Ospedale Maggiore for portraits of its benefactors. He presented a group of portraits at the 2nd Milan Triennale in 1894.

In 1886 in Milan, he exhibited a canvas depicting the Death of Charles Emmanuel II. Among other works were: Queen Elisabeth of England refuses to suspend the execution of Mary Stuart despite the request by the Scottish Ambassador, exhibited at Parma in 1870. In 1877 in Naples, he exhibited the Last Supper of Mary Stuart. Also in 1877 in Milan, he exhibited a portrait of a lady, and La musica buffa; I facili ammiratori; Mi ama o non mi ama?.

== Other projects ==
Media related to Francesco Valaperta at Wikimedia Commons
