= Pompeo Calvi =

Italian painter (1806–1884)

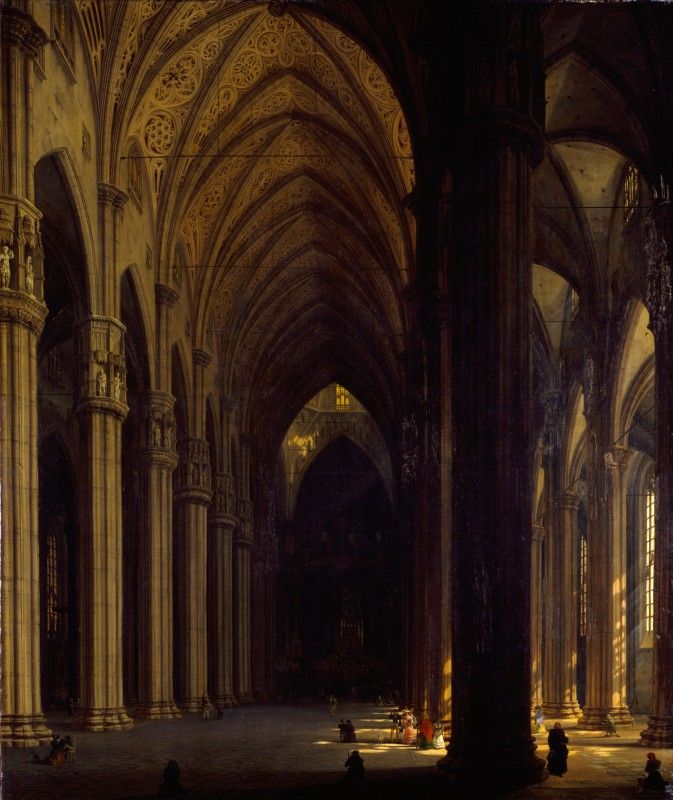
Interno del Duomo di Milano, 1835 (Art collections of Fondazione Cariplo)

Pompeo Calvi (1806–1884) was an Italian painter known especially for architectural subjects.

== Biography ==
He was born in Milan. A pupil of Giovanni Migliara, Calvi made his debut at the annual Esposizione dell’Accademia di Belle Arti di Brera in 1828. The repertoire of perspective views drawn directly from the master was revitalised with new subjects as the result of a long journey to Rome and Naples from 1830 to 1832. He was a constant presence at the Brera exhibitions until 1842, when he stopped painting altogether. An honorary member of the Brera Academy of Fine Arts as from 1850 and academic advisor from 1860, he resigned from his official posts in 1868. Regarded by critics as a dilettante of no particular interest, Calvi received important commissions from the Lombard and Piedmontese aristocracy. His commercial success reached its peak when one of his works was purchased for the Belvedere Gallery in Vienna.

== Other projects ==
Media related to Pompeo Calvi at Wikimedia Commons
