= Innocenzo Fraccaroli =

Italian sculptor

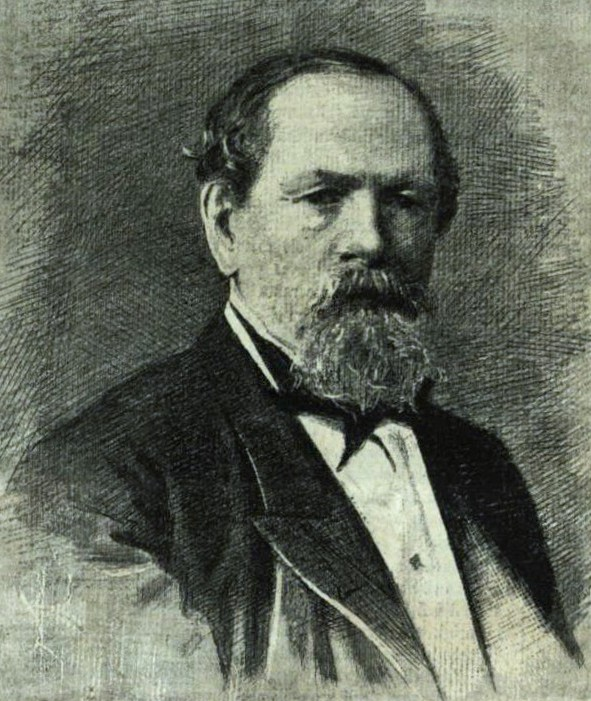
Innocenzo Fraccaroli

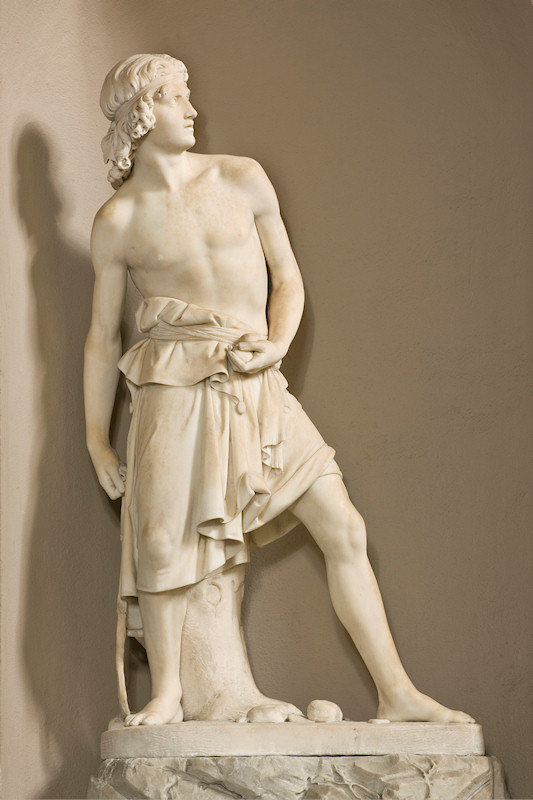
Davide che lancia la fionda, 1858 (Fondazione Cariplo)

Innocenzo Fraccaroli (1805, in Castelrotto di Valpolicella (Verona) – 1882, in Milan) was an Italian sculptor.

A student at the Venice Academy of Fine Arts, Fraccaroli was the winner of the Brera Academy’s prize for sculpture in 1829. This success enabled him to complete his studies from 1830 to 1835 in Rome, where he met and mixed with some of the greatest sculptors of the day, including Thorvaldsen and Pietro Tenerani. Having returned to Milan in 1836 after a short stay in Verona, he focused in the 1840s on the customary mythological subjects and portraiture, adopting a style of austere Neoclassical ancestry but with unprecedented expressive intensity. A regular participant in the Brera exhibitions, he attained full recognition with participation in the Great Exhibition of 1851 in London and the Universal Exhibition of 1855 in Paris. Allegorical interpretations of the ideals of the struggle for national liberation known as the Risorgimento gave way in the 1850s to the production of openly patriotic works. The artist's activities diminished in the 1860s as a result of lack of success in the major competitions for public monuments – probably due to his outmoded classical style – and failure to obtain the chair in sculpture at the Brera Academy. The years of his maturity saw a particular focus on religious works and commemorative monuments. In 1876, on retiring from the world of art, he donated the plaster models of his most important works to the Museo Civico in Verona.

== Other projects ==
Media related to Innocenzo Fraccaroli at Wikimedia Commons
