= Mario Bettinelli =

Italian painter (1880–1953)

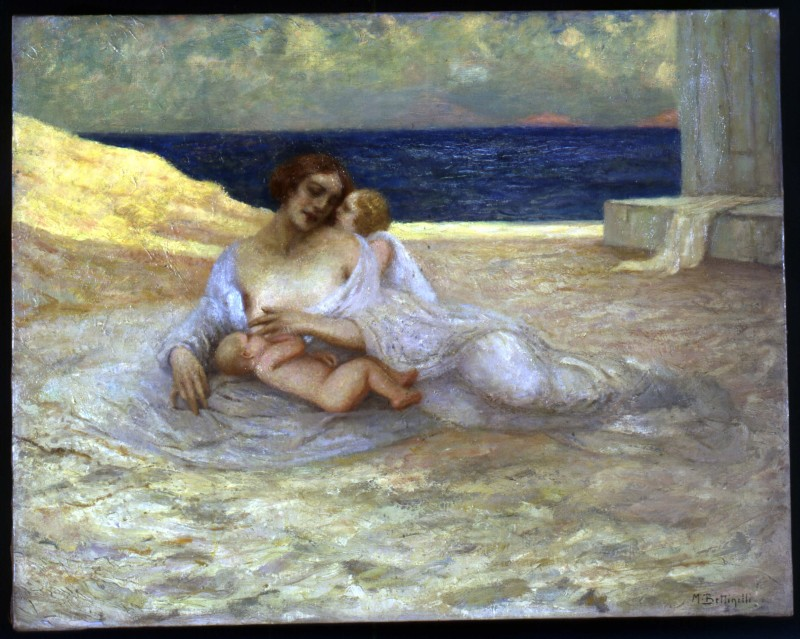
Maternità, 1921 (Art collections of Fondazione Cariplo)

Mario Bettinelli (1880–1953) was an Italian painter.

== Biography ==
He was born in Treviglio (Bergamo). It was in Brescia, where the family had moved, that Bettinelli attended the Moretto da Brescia school of drawing from 1895 to 1901, specialising in portraits and caricature. Highly gifted in technical terms, he moved to Milan in 1911 and came into contact with the Scapigliatura movement in its later stages, focusing on allegorical subjects and female portraits. His fame grew after World War I, and one of his paintings was purchased for Milan’s municipal art collection in 1918. He came under the influence of the Novecento Italiano movement in the 1920s but did not take part in its group exhibitions. Bettinelli exhibited works at Lino Pesaro’s gallery in 1923 and 1930. He devoted his energies mainly to views of the Lombard countryside during the 1930s and above all after World War II, until his death in 1953 in Milan.

== Other projects ==
Media related to Mario Bettinelli at Wikimedia Commons
