= Innocente Cantinotti =

Italian painter (1877–1940)

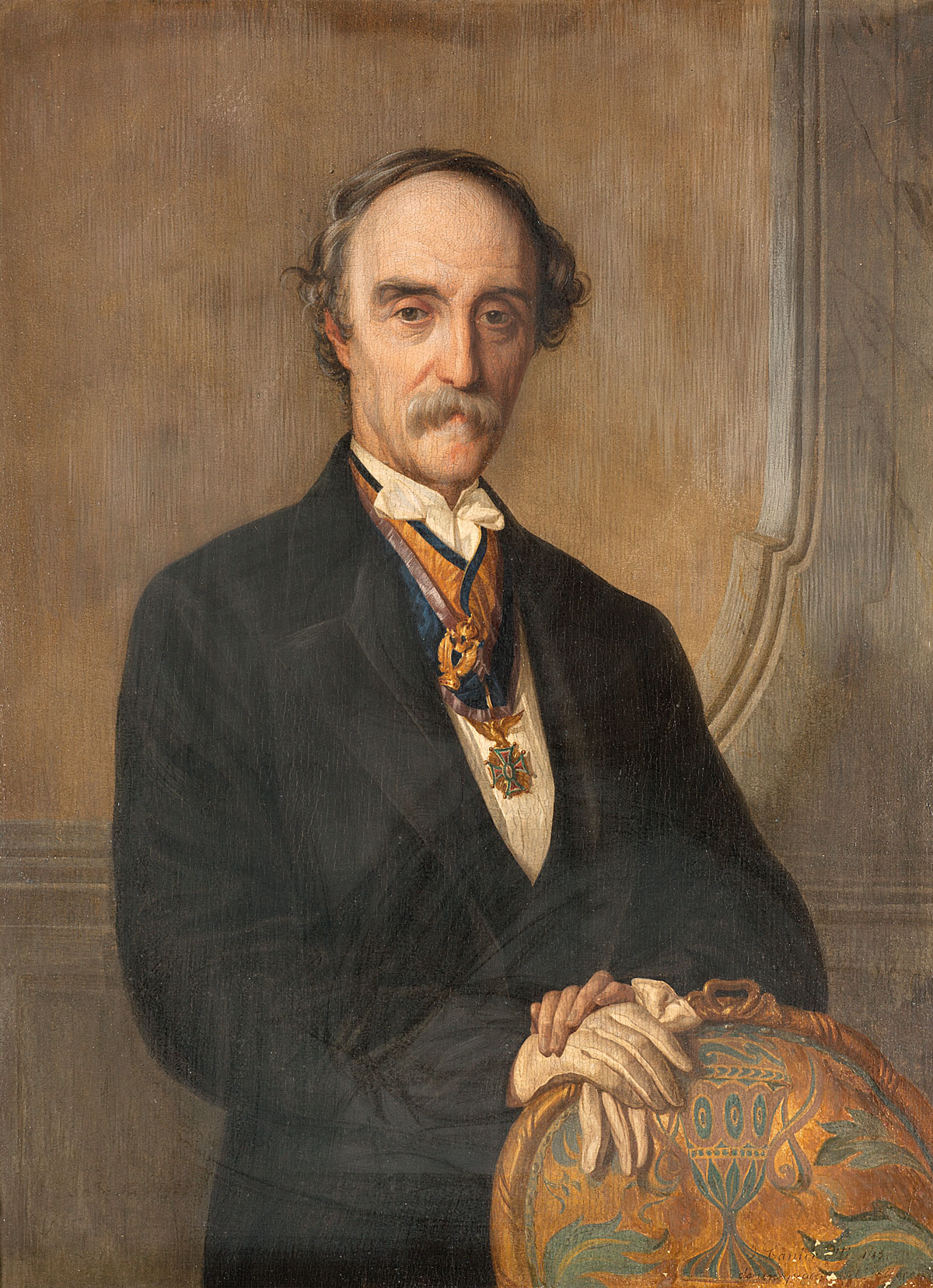
Ritratto del conte Galeazzo Manna Roncadelli, 1925 (Fondazione Cariplo)

Innocente Cantinotti (Milan, 1877–1940) was an Italian painter.

== Biography ==
Innocente Cantinotti worked in his native city of Milan as an apprentice in the stained glass workshop of Pompeo Bertini, and enrolled at the Brera Academy, attending courses taught by Raffaele Casnedi, Giuseppe Bertini and Giuseppe Mentessi. Under the direction of Mentessi, he participated in the creation of the Railway Workers Triptych in 1898 for the salon at the Società Nazionale Mutuo Soccorso fra Ferrovieri e Lavoratori dei Trasporti in Milan. He was a socialist by persuasion and participated in the lively intellectual climate of the Famiglia Artistica, of which he was a member, exhibiting portraits and sanguine drawings at their annual exhibitions. From the beginning of the century until the 1920s, he was lucky enough to have the opportunity, together with Guido Zuccaro and Giovanni Buffa, to gain experience in the artistic stained glass company managed by Giovanni Beltrami. He participated regularly in the exhibitions of the Società per le Belle Arti ed Esposizione Permanente and in the Brera exhibitions, including the 4th Triennale in 1900, where he won the Gavazzi Prize, and the Nazionale in 1906; in 1903 and 1905 he also showed works in the Esposizione Internazionale d’Arte di Venezia.

== Other projects ==
Media related to Innocente Cantinotti at Wikimedia Commons
