= Giuseppe Elena =

Italian painter and printmaker (1801–1867)

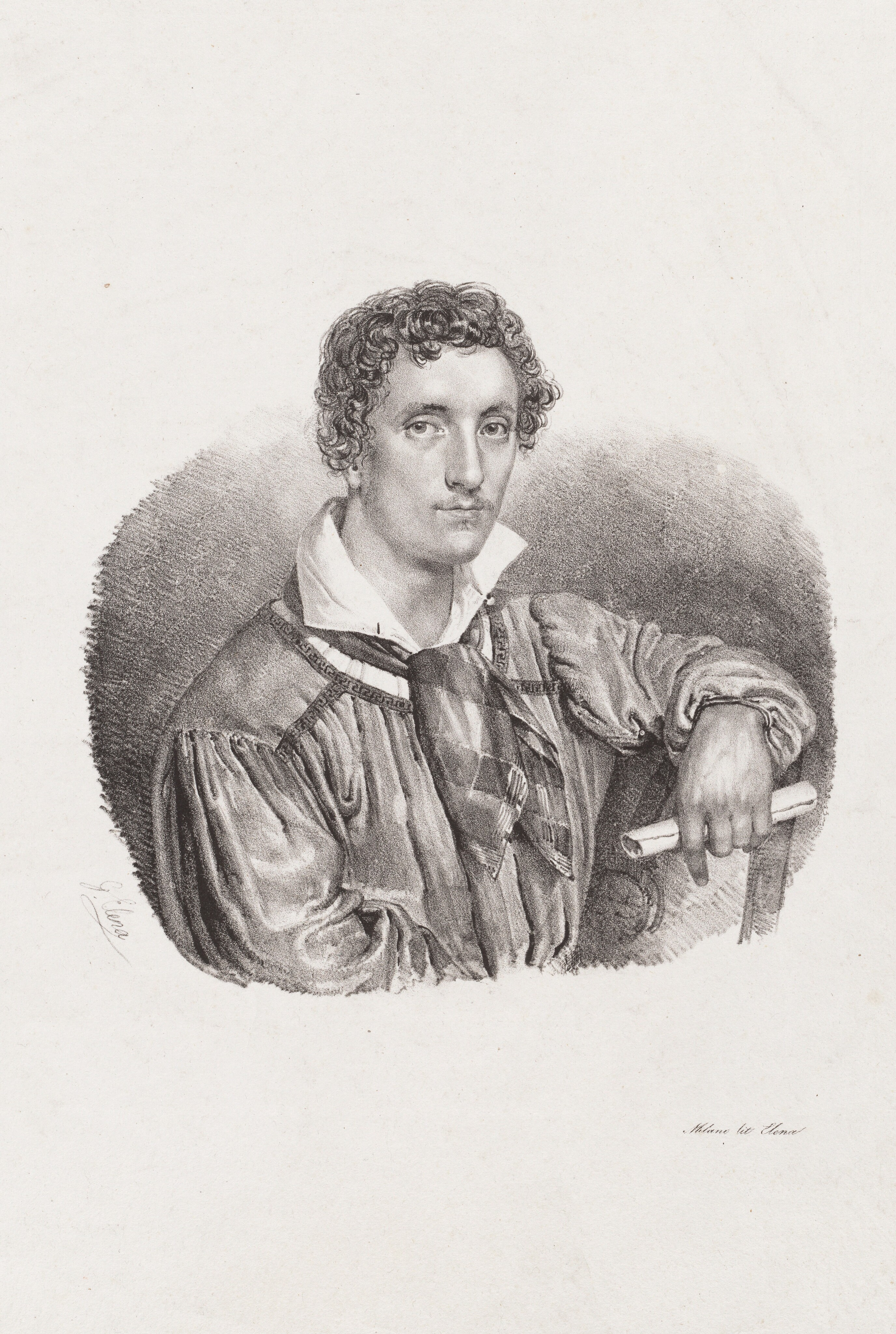
Giuseppe Elena, self-portrait (1820s)

Giuseppe Elena (1801–1867) was an Italian painter and printmaker.

== Biography ==
He was born in Codogno (Lodi). Having left the seminary in order to devote himself entirely to painting, Elena studied at the Brera Academy of Fine Arts in the 1820s, distinguishing himself for his work as a miniaturist and winning the second-class prize for figure studies in 1826. He obtained a licence to open a lithographic printing shop in 1827 and ran it as a self-taught printer, possibly in response to the growing interest in the engraving technique that had spread quickly at the Brera. When the shop was forced out of business by stiff competition in 1831, the artist continued to work for various publishers, reproducing works by celebrated artists of the time and making prints of views of Lombardy drawn from life. The same subjects – urban views and genre scenes – also featured in the paintings presented at the Brera exhibitions as from 1833. He started to write art criticism in 1841 and worked as a caricaturist on the Milanese periodical L’Uomo di Pietra in 1858 and 1859. He died in Milan in 1867.

== Other projects ==
Media related to Giuseppe Elena at Wikimedia Commons
