= Jules Jean-Baptiste Dehaussy =

French painter

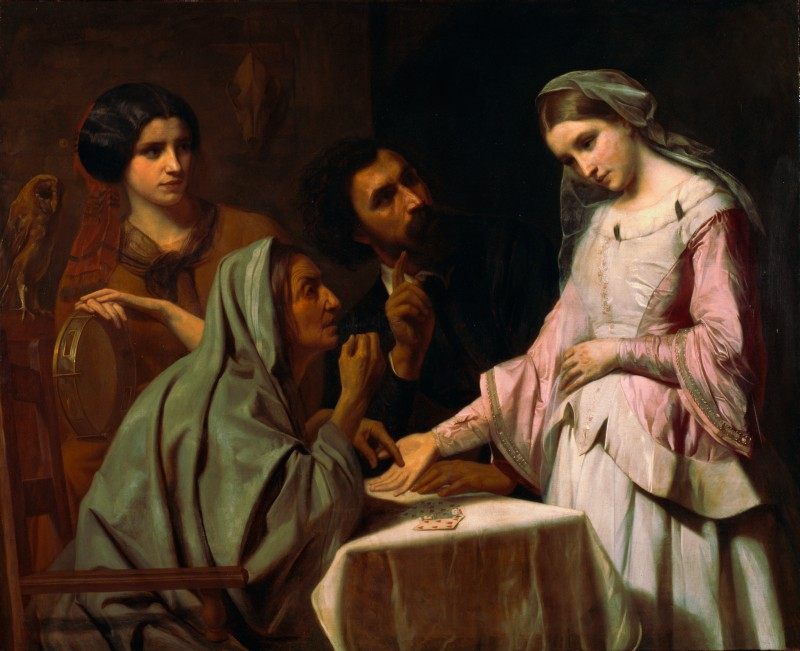
La cartomante, 1856 (Fondazione Cariplo)

Jules Jean-Baptiste Dehaussy (Péronne, France, 1812–1891) was a French painter.

== Biography ==
Introduced to painting by his brother Auguste, the leading spirit of an art school in Péronne, he subsequently became a pupil of the painter and illustrator Théophile Fragonard. A portraitist and painter of history and genre paintings he made his debut at the Paris Salon of 1836 and was awarded a third class medal.

An important exponent of an academic culture linked to official circles, he worked for the Versailles galleries in particular. In 1848, when commissions declined, he was forced to move to England. He participated regularly in the exhibitions at the Royal Academy in London with a series of miniature portraits and, in 1851, with two history paintings. After returning to Paris in 1852, he exhibited at the Salon until 1890 with a vast repertoire of genre scenes of historical inspiration that were very successful commercially, as well as portraits and religious subjects that were stylistically similar to those of his teacher.

He became famous on the international art scene from the 1850s onwards, following his participation in some of the major exhibitions of the time including the national Ghent Triennial Salon of 1853 and 1865, the 1865 Porto International Exhibition and the 1st International Exhibition of Fine Arts in Munich in 1869.

The Italian landscape shown at the Exhibition of Fine Arts in Lille in 1866, suggests that the artist was in Italy before that date, though sources traditionally date his stay to between 1869 and 1871.

== Bibliography ==
- Elena Lissoni, Jules Jean-Baptiste Dehaussy, online catalogue Artgate by Fondazione Cariplo, 2010, CC BY-SA (source for the first revision of this article).

== Other projects ==
Media related to Jules Jean-Baptiste Dehaussy at Wikimedia Commons
