= Alessandro Barbieri =

Italian painter (1850–1931)

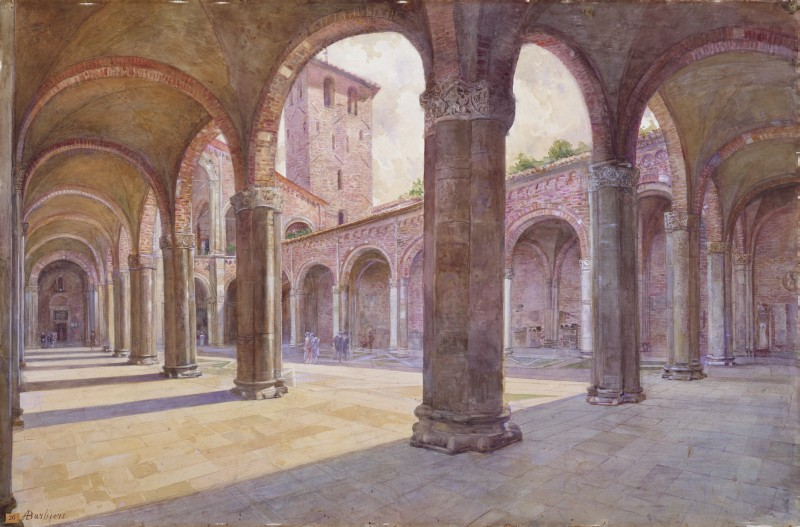
The Ancient Portico of Sant'Ambrogio, circa 1926

Alessandro Barbieri (1850 – September 26, 1931) was an Italian painter born in Milan.

He trained under Giuseppe Bertini and Tranquillo Cremona at the Accademia di Brera, painting genre themes. He exhibited four paintings in the Mostra Veneziana of 1887:

- Dolorose rimembranze
- Madre felice
- In sacrestia
- La cresima
