= Arturo Ferrari =

Italian painter

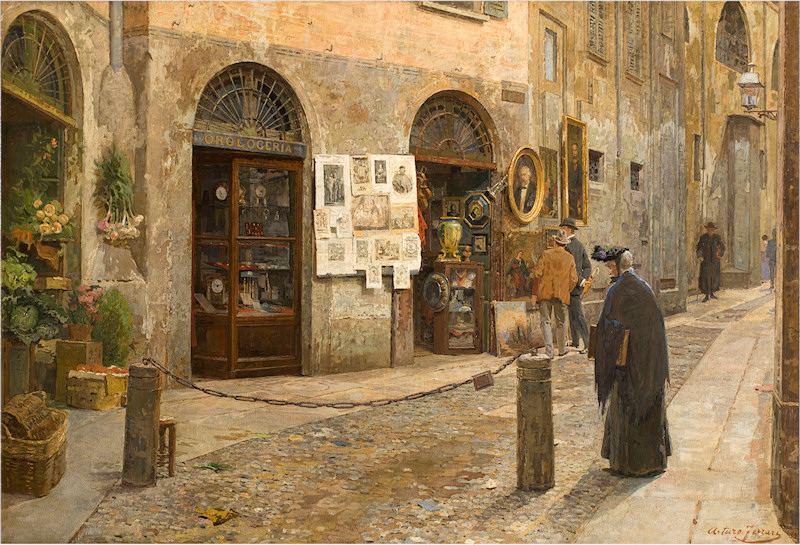
Nella vecchia via o Via San Bernardino in Milano, 1912 (Fondazione Cariplo)

Arturo Ferrari (Milan, 1861–1932) was an Italian painter.

== Biography ==
Initiated into artistic studies by his father Cesare, an associate of Luigi Scrosati, and the painter Mosè Bianchi from Lodi, Arturo Ferrari completed his training at the Brera Academy under the guidance of Giuseppe Bertini from 1877 to 1884 while working in the studio of Gerolamo Induno at the same time. He made his debut at the Esposizione di Belle Arti di Brera in 1879 with a view of the interior of Milan Cathedral, thus inaugurating the repertoire of Milanese perspective views that was to be a constant feature of his vast production of oil paintings and watercolours. He soon became the guiding spirit of a poetic and sentimental evocation of "Old Milan" during the phase of transition to the 20th century, when the face of the city changed radically through wholesale rebuilding. A regular participant in all the major exhibitions until 1932, the year of his death, he was the recipient of numerous marks of official recognition and enjoyed considerable success with the public as well as the esteem of conservative critics.

== Other projects ==
Media related to Arturo Ferrari at Wikimedia Commons
