= Fabio Fabbi =

Italian painter

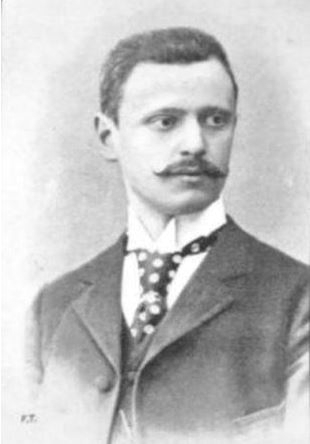
Fabio Fabbi (1898)

Fabio Fabbi (18 July 1861 – 24 September 1946) was an Italian Orientalist painter and illustrator.

== Life and work ==
Born in Bologna, he studied painting and sculpture with Augusto Rivalta, at the Academy of Fine Arts, Florence, where he would become a Professor in 1893.

He exhibited at the Società promotrice di belle arti (Society for the Promotion of the Fine Arts) in Turin, and at the Mostre di belle arti in Milan. In 1892, he was named a Knight in the Order of the Crown of Italy.

His major works include a Sacred Heart for the Chiesa di Sant'Antonio Abate (1902), and medals commemorating the sixth centenary of the birth of Petrarch (1904).

In addition to his paintings, he illustrated the works of Virgil and Lodovico Ariosto, as well as Italian translations of works by Louisa May Alcott, Charles Dickens, Jules Verne and Edgar Rice Burroughs, among many others.

He died in 1946 in Casalecchio di Reno.

== Selected paintings ==
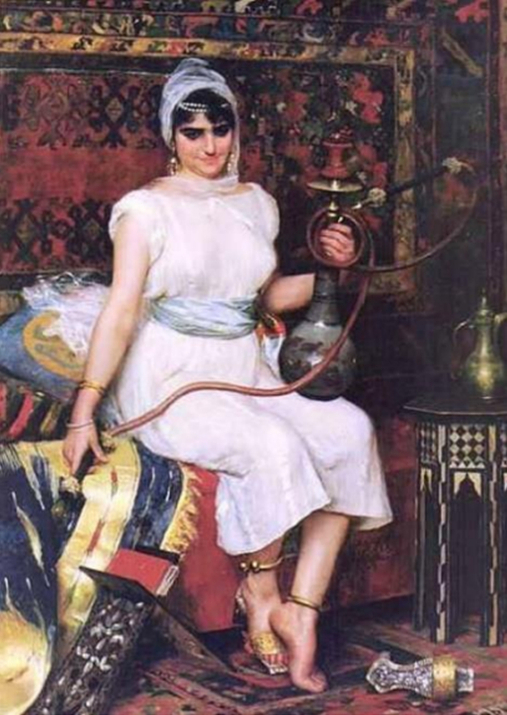
Algerian Woman

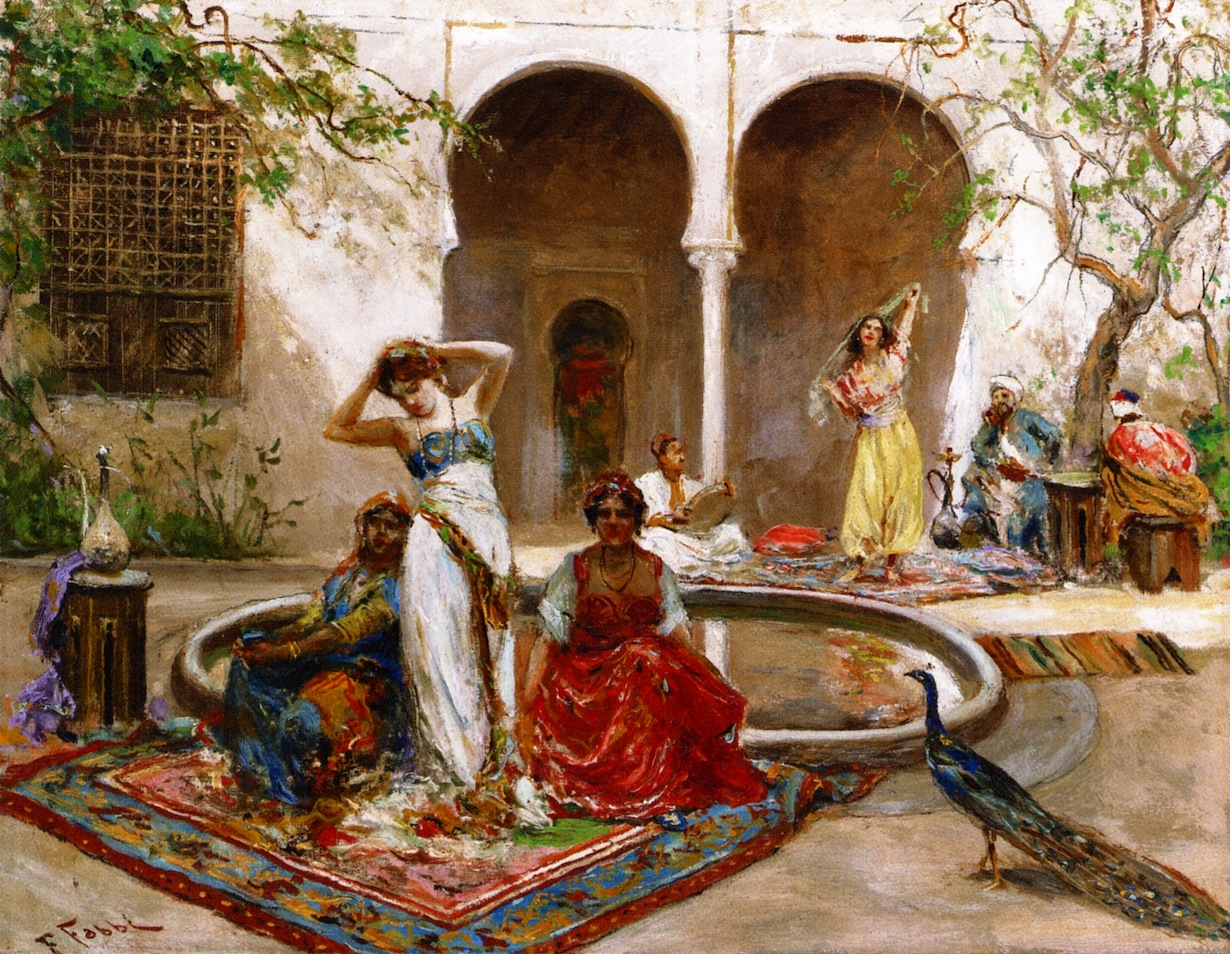
Dancing in the Harem Courtyard

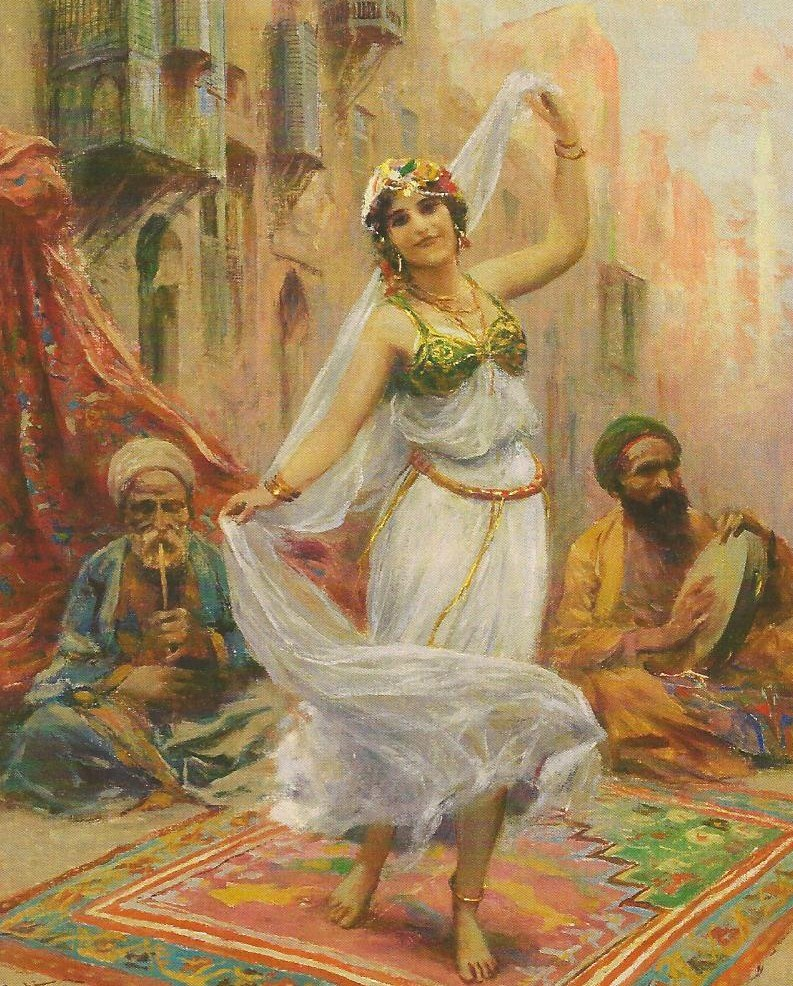
Oriental Dance

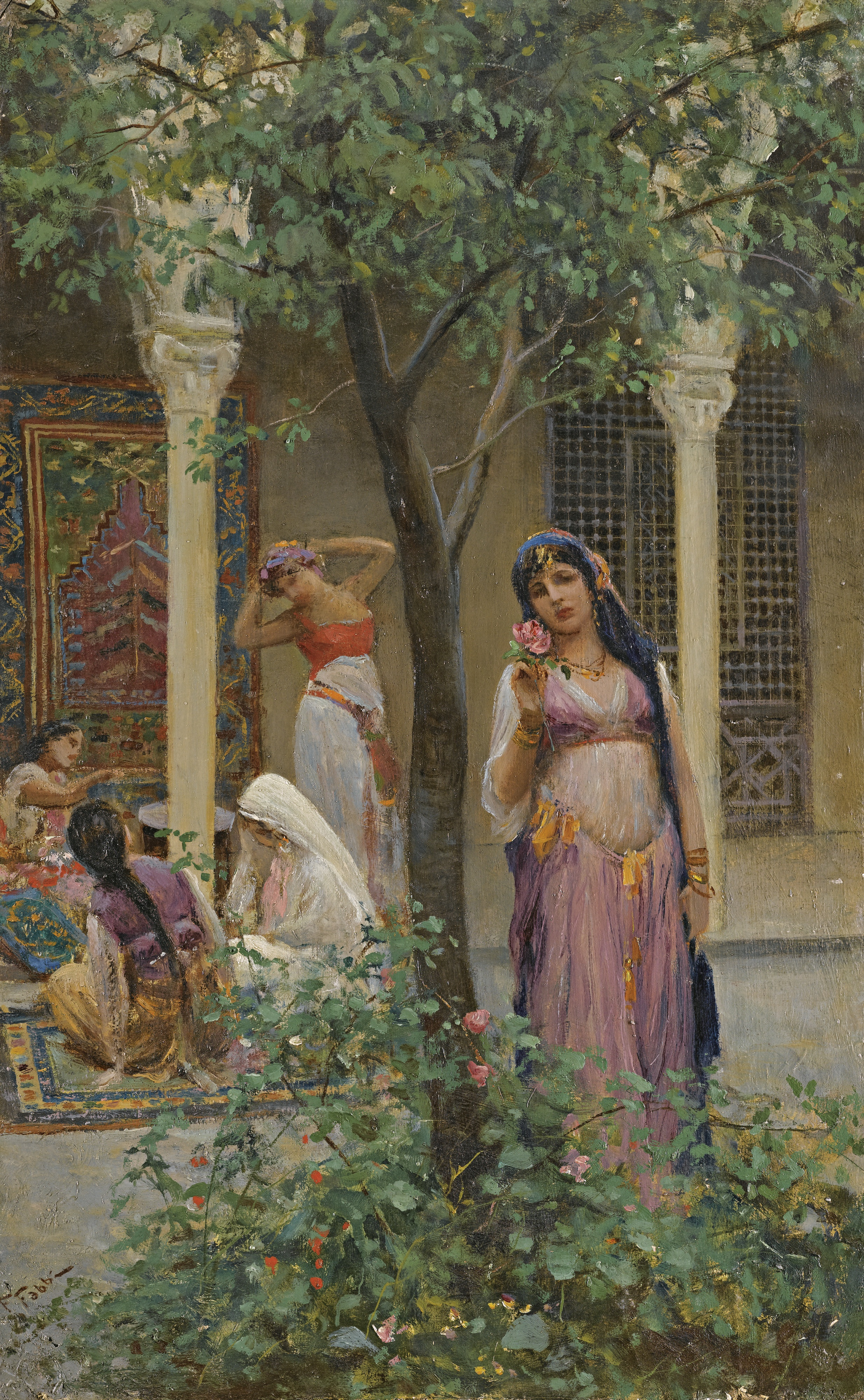
The Turkish Rose

== Sources ==
- Ulrich Thieme, Felix Becker, Hans Vollmer: Allgemeines Lexikon der Bildenden Künstler von der Antike bis zur Gegenwart, Vol.11 E. A. Seemann, 1915 pgs.146-147 Online
- Caroline Juler, Les orientalistes de l'école italienne, ACR Edition, 1996 pgs.68-71 ISBN 978-2-86770-076-7 Online
- Angelo De Gubernatis, Dizionario degli artisti italiani viventi, Le Monnier, pgs.189-190 Online
