= Francesco Sartorelli =

Italian painter (1856–1939)

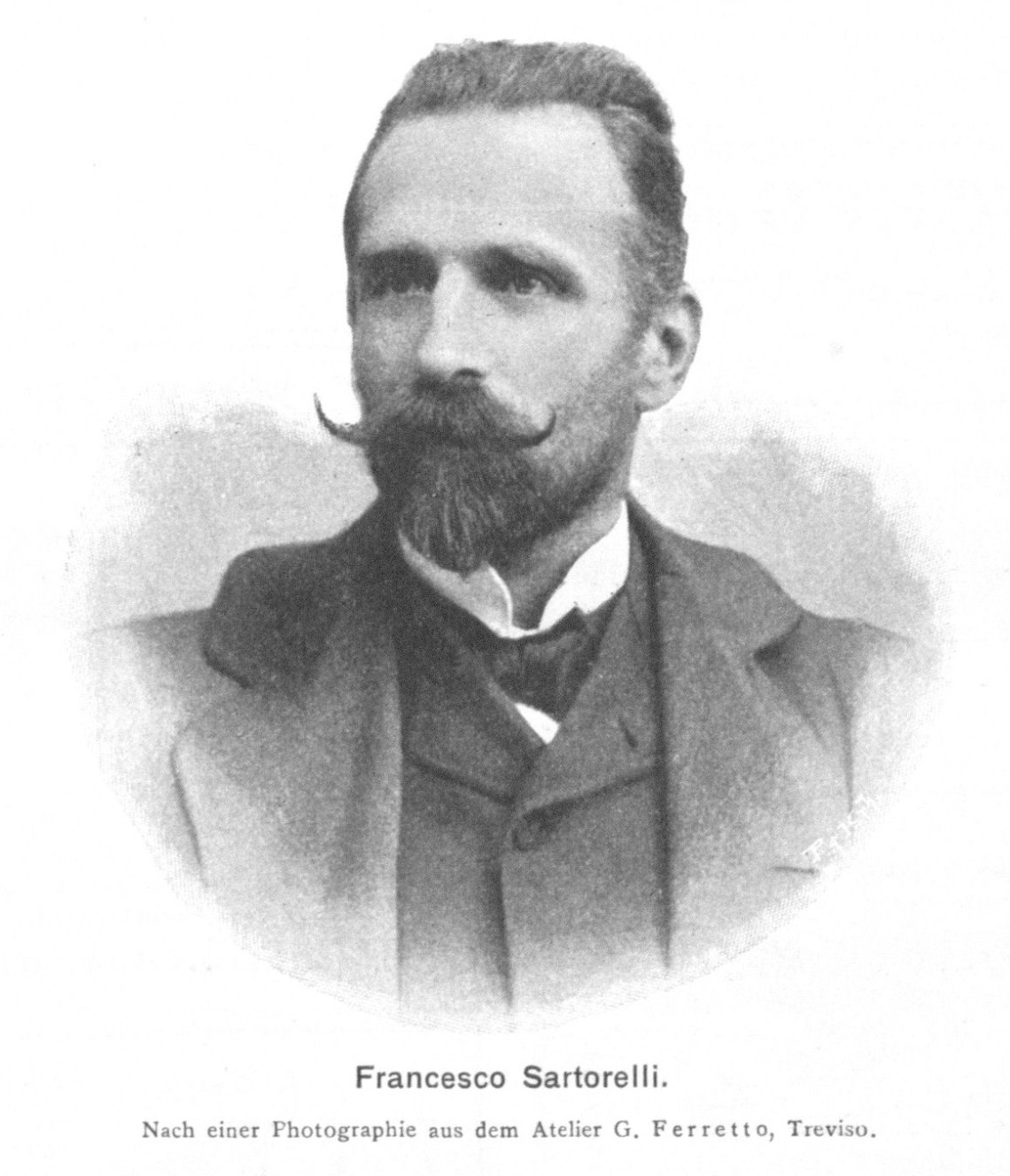
Francesco Sartorelli (photo by G. Ferretto in Treviso, 1902)

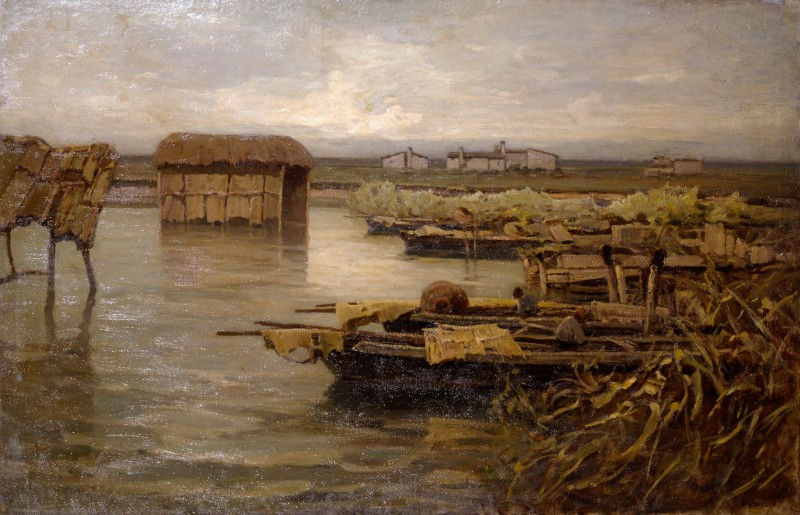
Laguna, 1915 ca. (Art collections of Fondazione Cariplo)

Francesco Sartorelli (1856 in Cornuda, Province of Trieste – 1939 in Udine) was an Italian painter.

== Biography ==
Francesco Sartorelli came from a well-to-do family – his father was a solicitor at Asolo – and after secondary school he enrolled at the Faculty of Medicine in Padua, though he abandoned his studies around 1875 to attend the Milan Conservatory. Serious health problems forced him to give up his career as a flautist and on his return to Cornuda he began to teach himself painting. In 1889 he moved to Venice and made friends with Alessandro Milesi; that same year he exhibited for the first time at the Turin Promotrice. He took part in the Esposizioni Internazionali d’Arte di Venezia from the first edition in 1895 onwards. In 1900 his landscape painting received definitive recognition by being awarded the Principe Umberto Prize at the Brera exhibition, followed by the gold medal at the 8th Munich International Art Exhibition the following year. In 1903 the art dealer Ferruccio Stefani, who was active in South America, organised a solo exhibition for him, which travelled to Buenos Aires, Montevideo and Valparaíso. His works were also shown at the International Centenary Exhibition in Buenos Aires in 1910 and that same year the Venice Biennale devoted a whole room to forty-six works by Sartorelli. In 1924 he moved to Milan, where the Galleria Pesaro mounted a solo exhibition for him the following year. In 1940, a few months after his death, the 23rd Venice Biennale devoted a major retrospective to him organized by his son Carlo, who was also a painter.

== Other projects ==
Media related to Francesco Sartorelli at Wikimedia Commons
