= Emilio Magistretti =

Italian painter (1851–1936)

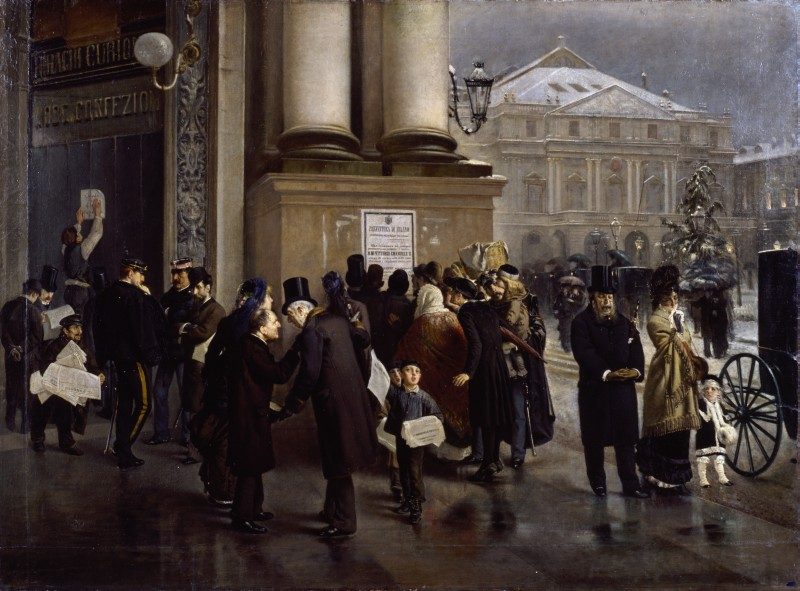
L'annuncio della morte di Vittorio Emanuele a Milano, 1880 (Fondazione Cariplo)

Emilio Magistretti (1851 in Milan – 1936) was an Italian painter.

== Biography ==
Magistretti studied at the Brera Academy of Fine Arts from 1871 to 1875 under the guidance of Francesco Hayez and then accompanied him on his Italian journey of 1879. He worked initially in a range of different areas, from genre scenes to religious subjects and perspective painting, and successfully tried his hand at painting portraits, animals and landscapes at the turn of the century. He began to establish his reputation as an artist in 1880, when he was awarded a prize by the Ministry of Education, and became well known as a painter of moderately naturalistic portraits particularly appreciated by the middle-class establishment. An autobiography richly illustrated with reproductions of his most celebrated works was published in 1926.

== Other projects ==
Media related to Emilio Magistretti at Wikimedia Commons
