= Giovanni Maimeri =

Italian painter (1884–1951)

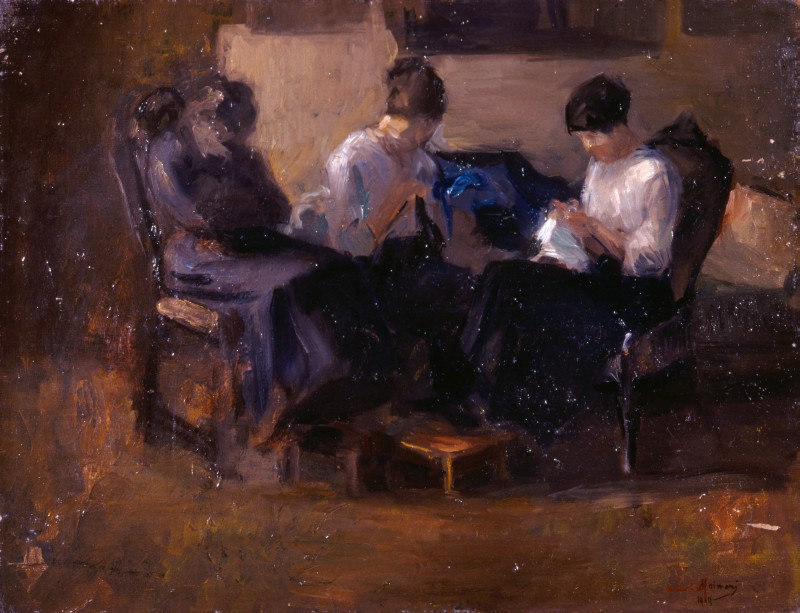
Conversazione, 1919 (Fondazione Cariplo)

Giovanni (Gianni) Maimeri (1884–1951) was an Italian painter.

== Biography ==
Giovanni Maimeri was born in Varano, Varese. He was self-taught and completed his training in Venice and Milan, where he studied at the studio of Leonardo Bazzaro from 1906 onwards. His meeting with Emilio Gola in 1908 was decisive in the development of his artistic research with a naturalistic approach, which focused on the impact of light on objects and on the role of colour. In 1910 he made his debut in the Esposizione di Belle Arti at the Società Permanente with subjects taken from Milan nightlife, a landscape and figures. The same themes, which he tackled repeatedly during the following years, were brought together in his first solo exhibition at the Galleria Geri in Milan, in 1918. Starting in 1923, he worked on an idea to start manufacturing paints for artistic use industrially, in collaboration with his brother Carlo, a graduate in chemical engineering. From 1929 onwards he devoted himself to views of the Milan canals presented the following year at the Giornale dell’Arte salon, which was to become a characteristic theme of his output. He was systematically excluded from the Esposizione Internazionale d’Arte della Città di Venezia and from the Mostre del Sindacato Fascista, but continued to exhibit during the 1940s at the most important private galleries in Milan and Rome. He died in Milan.

== Other projects ==
Media related to Gianni Maimeri at Wikimedia Commons
