= Volterrano Volterrani =

Italian sculptor

- Born: 5 October 1891; Carrara, Italy
- Died: 15 March 1963 (aged 71); Rome, Italy
- Occupation: Sculptor

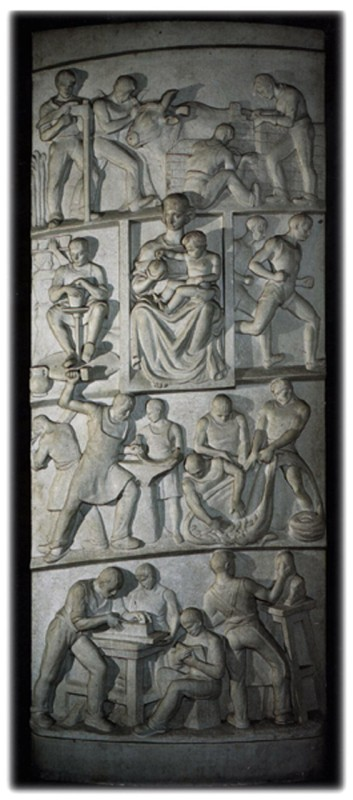
L'uomo e il lavoro (Man and work) by Volterrani Volterrano

Volterrano Volterrani (5 October 1891 – 15 March 1963) was an Italian sculptor. His work was part of the sculpture event in the art competition at the 1936 Summer Olympics.
