= Arrigo Renato Marzola =

Italian painter

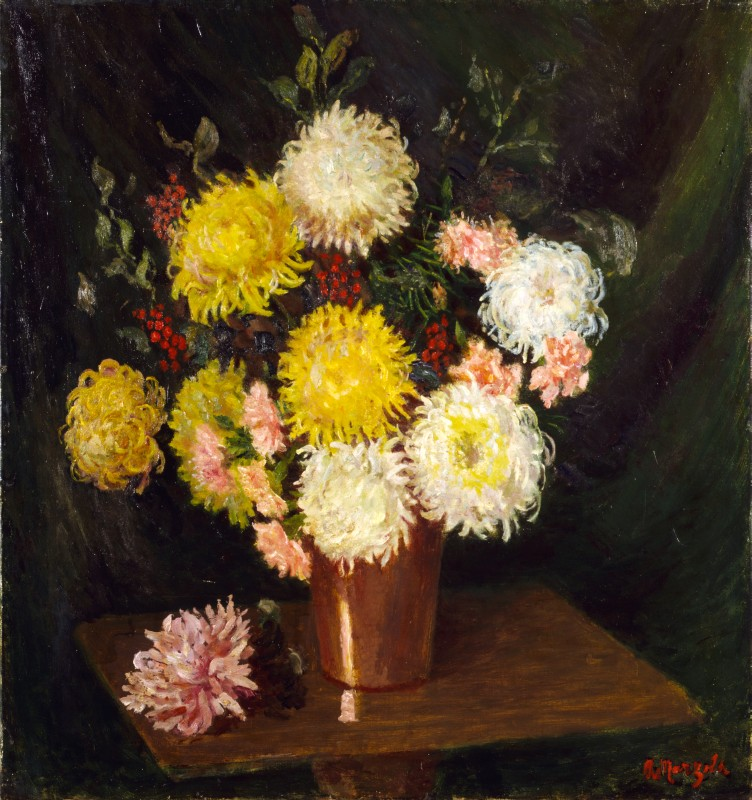
Fiori (Flowers), c. 1937 (Fondazione Cariplo)

Arrigo Renato Marzola (1889–1965) was an Italian painter.

== Biography ==
Marzola was born in Ostellato, Italy. He attended the courses taught by Cesare Tallone at the Brera Academy of Fine Arts from 1906 to 1911, focusing on portraiture, landscape and still life. He made his debut in Milan at the Esposizione Annuale di Belle Arti di Milano of 1912 and at the Venice Biennale with the 11th Esposizione Internazionale della Città di Venezia in 1914. He served in World War I and established his reputation in the 1920s, not least by winning the Gavazzi Prize at the Esposizione Nazionale di Belle Arti di Milano in 1920. The same year saw his appointment as professor of drawing at the Milan school of arts and crafts, a post he was to hold until 1959. Associated with the Novecento Italiano movement, he exhibited work at the Galleria Pesaro in 1927 and the Galleria Gianferrari in 1928. The Galleria d'Arte Moderna, Milan, bought one of his paintings in 1931.

Marzola died in Garbagnate Milanese in 1965.

== Other projects ==
Media related to Arrigo Renato Marzola at Wikimedia Commons
