= Guido Farina =

Italian painter

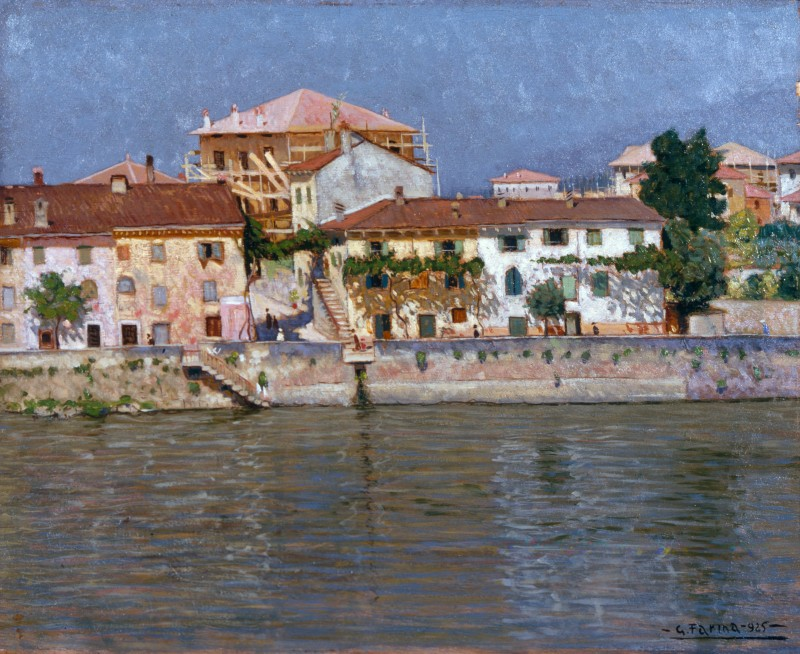
Mattino d'estate sull'Adige o Lungo Adige a Verona, 1925 (Fondazione Cariplo)

Guido Farina (1896–1957) was an Italian painter.

== Biography ==
Farina was born in Verona, Italy. He enrolled at the Cignaroli Academy in Verona in 1910 and made his debut in 1918 at an exhibition held by the city's Pro Assistenza Civica organisation. He was associated with the artists of the Burano School in the 1920s and his urban views and landscapes were presented in the show of dissident artists at Ca' Pesaro. His participation in the Venice Biennale began by invitation in 1924 with the 14th Esposizione Internazionale d'Arte della Città di Venezia. He was closely associated with the Novecento Italiano movement in this period and took part in the group's first and second exhibitions (Milan, 1926 and 1929). His first solo show was held in 1931 at the Galleria del Milione, Milan, and he took part in the Prima Quadriennale Nazionale d'Arte in Rome, where the Galleria Mussolini bought one of his works. He made frequent trips to Paris as well as Britain, Germany, Switzerland and Austria. He also worked in the fields of decoration and fresco (Verona, Museo di Castelvecchio, 1925–1929, and Palazzo del Podestà, 1929–1930).

Farina died in Padua in 1957.

== Other projects ==
Media related to Guido Farina at Wikimedia Commons
