= Carlo Donelli =

Italian painter (1661–1715)

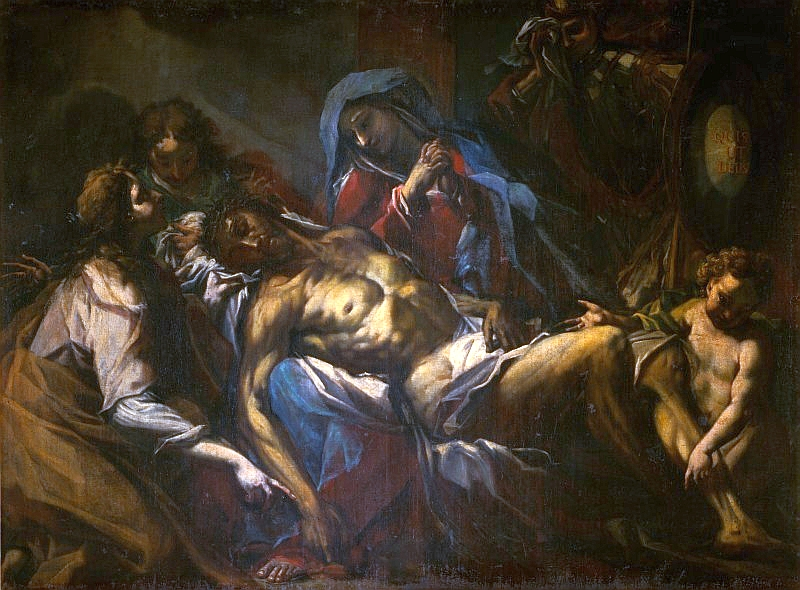
Compianto del Cristo morto (Fondazione Cariplo)

Carlo Donelli (Milan, 1661–1715) was an Italian painter, known as Vimercati.

== Biography ==
Donelli was probably a pupil of Ercole Procaccini the Younger and his training included the study of Daniele Crespi’s frescoes for the Carthusian monastery in Garegnano. Influenced by the painting of the Venetian Tenebrists, possibly through the work of Filippo Abbiati, he worked at first in the provinces (Codogno and Varese) and then on various churches in Milan. While few of Donelli's works survive, significant evidence of his style is provided by his altarpiece of Saint Anne Offering Mary to the Eternal Father for the Sanctuary of Our Lady of Sorrows in Rho.

== Other projects ==
Media related to Carlo Donelli at Wikimedia Commons
