= Leonardo Borgese =

Italian painter

- Born: 24 December 1904; Naples, Italy
- Died: 17 June 1986 (aged 81); Milan, Italy
- Occupation: Painter

Leonardo Borgese (24 December 1904 – 17 June 1986) was an Italian painter. His work was part of the painting event in the art competition at the 1932 Summer Olympics.
