= Cesare Monti (painter) =

Italian painter (1891–1959)

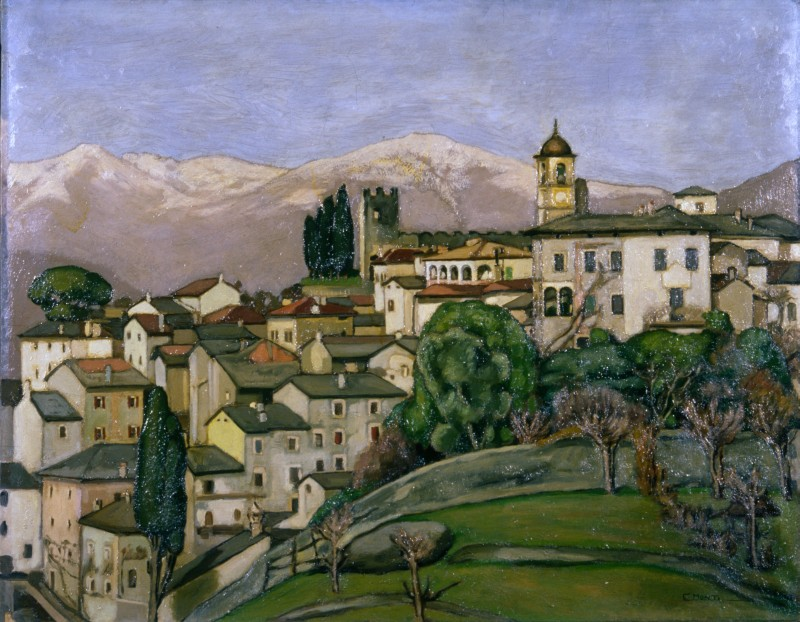
Corenno Plinio - Lago di Como, c. 1924 (Fondazione Cariplo)

Cesare Monti (1891–1959) was an Italian painter.

== Biography ==
After studying in Paris, France, Monti moved to Milan in 1911 and began to focus on landscapes, female figures and still lifes. His debut came with works of a Divisionist character at the annual show of the Milan Società per le Belle Arti ed Esposizione Permanente in 1912. He was associated with the Novecento Italiano movement in the 1920s and took in their first and second exhibitions (Milan, 1926 and 1929). His handling of space acquired greater solidity in this period. His participation in the Venice Biennale began by invitation in 1920 with the 12th Esposizione Internazionale d'Arte della Città di Venezia. Associated with the group known as the Cenacolo di Via Bagutta in the 1930s, he achieved fame in 1940, when a room was devoted exclusively to his work at the 22nd Esposizione Internazionale d'Arte della Città di Venezia. The tradition of the school of Lombard Naturalism is clearly reflected in the works produced after World War II.

== Other projects ==
Media related to Cesare Monti (painter) at Wikimedia Commons
