= Riccardo Pellegrini =

Italian painter (1863–1934)

Riccardo Pellegrini (1863–1934) was an Italian painter and illustrator.

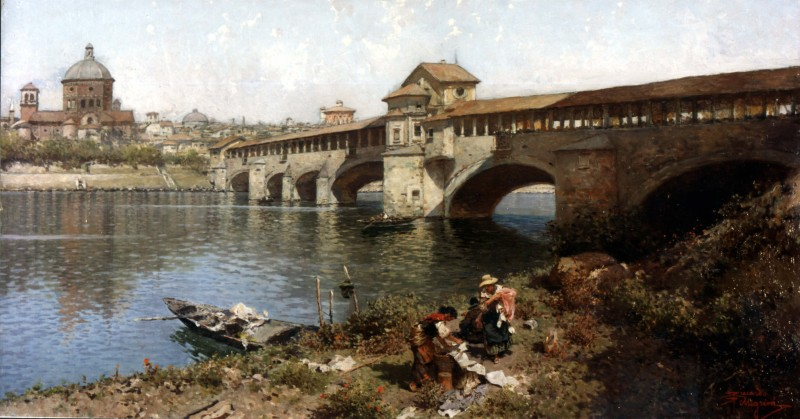
Medieval bridge over Ticino at Pavia, circa 1900, (Fondazione Cariplo)

He was born in Milan. Influenced by Romanticism, Pellegrini studied in Rome and Naples with Domenico Morelli. He then took up travelling around Europe, completing many landscapes and urban scenes from his trips in Spain, England and France.

He also illustrated an edition of Miguel de Cervantes's Don Quixote and Alain-René Lesage's Gil Blas.

Among his most popular paintings are Nel mercato Jerez; Sur la promenade des Anglais; Notes of Spain: Remembrance of Seville; Remembrance of my nation: El picador; Premier Espada: View of Seville; Spaniard Prototype, and A Bullfighter. He died in Crescenzago.
