= Piero Giunni =

Italian painter

Piero Giunni (1912, in Villa Cortese (Milan) – 2000, in Bondone (Trento)) was an Italian painter.

== Biography ==
Giunni worked as a decorator and studied at the academies in Milan and Venice before the outbreak of World War II. He then made his debut in 1949 at the Galleria Annunciata, Milan, with landscapes set in the Po Valley. Contact with Art Informel in Paris in the 1950s led to a move towards non-figurative painting. He took part in the 6th Rome Quadrenniale in 1951 and the Venice Biennale of 1956, where he was awarded the prize for a young artist at the 18th Esposizione Internazionale d’Arte della Città di Venezia. The Galleria del Milione in Milan held a solo show of his work in 1962. From 1964 on, practically all of his painting took place at a mill in the countryside near Legnano, where he devoted himself to landscapes of the Po Valley and still lifes.

== Other projects ==
Media related to Piero Giunni at Wikimedia Commons
