= Aldo Raimondi =

Italian painter (1902–1997)

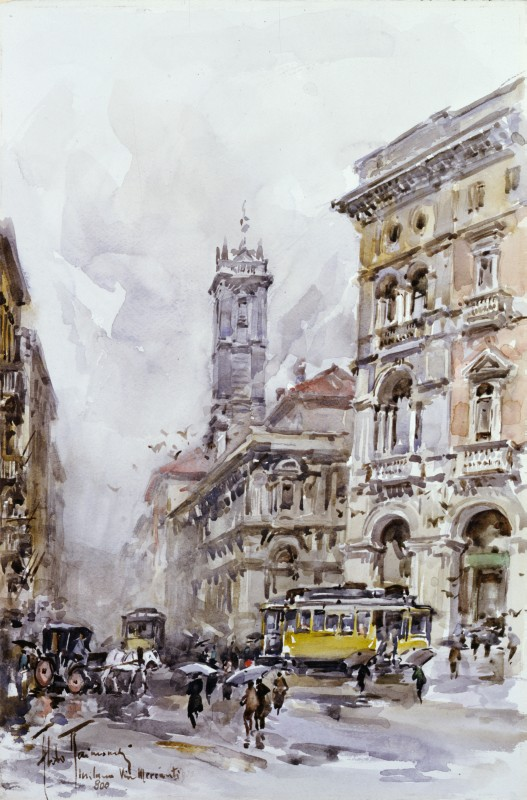
Aldo Raimondi, Milano Ottocento – Via Mercanti (1970).

Aldo Raimondi (Rome, 1902 – Milan, 1997), was an Italian painter.

== Biography ==
Born in Rome in 1902, Raimondi began his artistic career there in the studio of Giuseppe Signorini. He majored in architecture at the Academy of Fine Arts at the age of 22. Between 1925 and 1926 he lived in Milan, where he served in the Italian military; while there, he painted a fresco for a barracks, and restored some of the rooms of the Palazzo Cusani, home of the Command of the Army Corps.

Raimondi moved to Parma in 1926, and began to teach in the local Art Institute: there he inserted himself into a difficult environment without much effort, and was quickly befriended by the natives for his extraordinary dedication to his craft and the eye-catching qualities of his character. In Parma, he was commissioned by the mayor to paint some watercolors of the view over the old city, still visible today in the Town Hall, which are proof of his skill as a landscape artist; Raimondi would receive other such commissions both in Italy and abroad later on. In Parma in 1930 he organized his first of many solo exhibitions, both in Italy and abroad. From 1938 to 1940 he replaced Achille Beltrame as the illustrator of Domenica del Corriere, and later was called to illustrate "The People of Turin."

Specializing in watercolor painting, an exclusive piece of his repertoire, in 1939 he was appointed a professor of watercolors at the Academy of Brera, a chair he left immediately after the war to devote himself full-time to making films. Later he painted landscapes, animals, flowers and many portraits, including those of the Popes Pius XII, John XXIII (1958) and Pope Paul VI (1966). He also produced some windows for the Seminary of Monza, for the parish of Menaggio in Como, and the church of San Simpliciano in Milan.

== Bibliography ==
- Catalogo online Artgate della Fondazione Cariplo, 2010, CC-BY-SA.
- F. Pestellini, Aldo Raimondi e il romanzo dell'acquarello, Florence, 1966.
- A. Raimondi, La mia vita per l'acquarello, Rome, 1979.
- S. e S. Minardi, I cinque grandi dell'acquarello, Milan, 1986.
- Salvatore Minardi, Catalogo Generale Vol. 1, Milan, 1999.
