= Giuseppe Guerreschi =

Italian painter (1929–1985)

Giuseppe Guerreschi (Milan, 1929 – Nice, 1985) was an Italian painter.

== Biography ==
Guerreschi started taking evening painting classes at the Brera Academy in 1947 while working as a clerk in a Milanese bank. In 1951, he quit his job and attended the Academy’s regular courses. He studied painting with Aldo Carpi and engraving with Benvenuto Disertori, graduating in 1954. In the second half of the 1950s he took part in a group exhibitions of artists associated to the "Existential Realism" movement.

Through the American dealer Charles Feingarten, Guerreschi's work was the subject of solo exhibitions in Chicago (1955, 1956, 1958, 1959), San Francisco (1959) and New York City (1960). He also displayed his works at the Venice Biennale in 1960, 1964 and 1972.

In 1986, shortly after Guerreschi’s death, curator and art historian Renato Barilli organised a retrospective of the artist at the Rotonda di Via Besana in Milan.

== Bibliography ==
- Laura Casone, Giuseppe Guerreschi, online catalogue Artgate by Fondazione Cariplo, 2010, CC BY-SA (source for the first revision of this article).

== Other projects ==
Media related to Giuseppe Guerreschi at Wikimedia Commons
