= Felicita Frai =

Italian painter (1909–2010)

Felicita Frai (born Felice Frajová; 20 October 1909 – 14 April 2010) was a Czech-born Italian painter.

== Biography ==
She was born in Prague, Bohemia, Austria-Hungary. After dropping out of university in her native city, she moved to Italy, living first in Trieste and then Ferrara. Here she studied fresco painting under Achille Funi, collaborating with him in 1936 on the decoration of the Palazzo della Consulta. In 1938 she made her debut at the Venice Biennale, participating again in 1948. In the 1940s she went to live in Milan where she frequented Giorgio de Chirico's studio and showed her work at all the editions of the Triennale from 1945 to 1954. She devoted herself to figure painting and still life, but also to engraving and the illustration of books, such as Through the Looking Glass by Lewis Carroll (1947 Italian edition) and L'albero del riccio by Antonio Gramsci (1948). She died in 2010 in Milan.
