= Aldo Conti =

Italian painter (1890–1988)

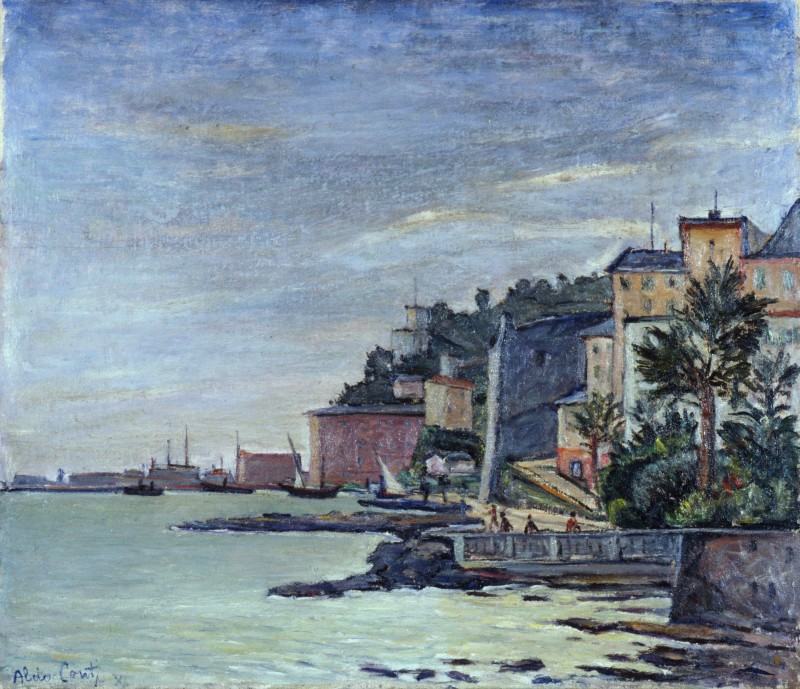
Santa Margherita Ligure, 1933 (Fondazione Cariplo)

Aldo Conti (1890–1988) was an Italian painter.

== Biography ==
He was born in Milan, Italy. He studied between 1911 and 1914 both in Milan and in Paris, where he attended the course in architecture at the School of Fine Arts. Having returned to Italy, he devoted his energies to landscapes and urban views. Though influenced by the Novecento Italiano movement in the years after World War I, he did not participate in its group exhibitions. He began showing works in the national events held by the Milan Società per le Belle Arti ed Esposizione Permanente in the 1930s and took part in the Rome Quadrenniale (Quadriennale Nazionale d'Arte di Roma, 1931 and 1943) and the Venice Biennale (Esposizione Internazionale d'Arte di Venezia, 1936, 1940 and 1942). He was awarded the Sallustio Fornara Prize at the Mostra Sociale Autunnale della Società per le Belle Arti in 1938 and his painting The Lombard Countryside was purchased for the Galleria d'Arte Moderna in Milan as a result. He also took part in the first Bergamo Prize competition, held in the same year, as well as the edition of 1940.

== Other projects ==
Media related to Aldo Conti at Wikimedia Commons
