= Camillo Rapetti =

Italian painter (1859–1929)

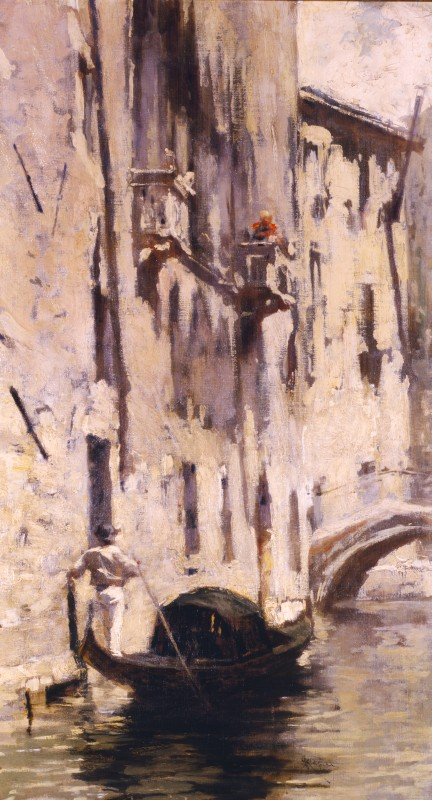
Venezia, 1880-1885 (Art collections of Fondazione Cariplo)

Camillo Rapetti (1859, Milan – 1929) was an Italian painter.

== Biography ==
Rapetti attended the School of Decorative and Figural Art at the Brera Academy in Milan, where he debuted by winning the Fumagalli Prize with a portrait commissioned by Vittore Grubicy. He travelled to Rome, Paris, and London, developing techniques in oil painting, watercolour, and engraving. He received important commissions for decorative work in Milan, frescoing civic buildings like the Teatro Eden and religious edifices like the church of the Ospedale Maggiore. He also executed some portraits of benefactors for the same institution. He showed genre scenes at the Turin Quadriennale in 1902 and the Mostra Nazionale of Fine Arts in Milan in 1906. In 1926, he participated in the first exhibition of Milanese artists organized by the Famiglia Meneghina.

Among his works are: Primavera; Il medico condotto; Il preferito; Corri, corri; Il Corso Venezia a Milan; Portrait of the signorina Liuzzi; La partila alla mora; Papà, non vieni?; A tiro; i primi pani, and Gambrino. He taught at the Brera Academy.

== Other projects ==
Media related to Camillo Rapetti at Wikimedia Commons
