= Alessandro Focosi =

Italian painter (1836–1869)

Alessandro Focosi (June 14, 1836 – February 1, 1869) was an Italian painter born in Milan, Austrian Empire.

== Biography ==
The son of the painter and illustrator Roberto Focosi, Alessandro completed his artistic training at the Brera Academy of Fine Arts, where Francesco Hayez was his master. Focosi won numerous academic prizes, and received a grant from the Brera that enabled him to visit Florence, Rome and Turin for study purposes between 1858 and 1860.

He returned to Milan by 1866, and specialised in Romantic treatments of historical and literary subjects that were widely praised and received official recognition. In 1866, he painted a Catherine de' Medici induces Charles IX to exile the Huguenots and in 1868, Carlo Emanuele of Savoy confronts the Ambassador of Spain. The latter painting won the first prize, 10,000 lire, in a national contest instituted in 1866 by minister Broglio. He was made an honorary member of the Brera Academy of Fine Arts in 1863. In addition to the exhibitions of the Brera and the Promotrice in Turin, his works were also shown at the Universal Exhibition in Paris in 1867 and the Munich Exhibition of Fine Arts in 1869.
