= Pietro Foglia =

Italian sculptor

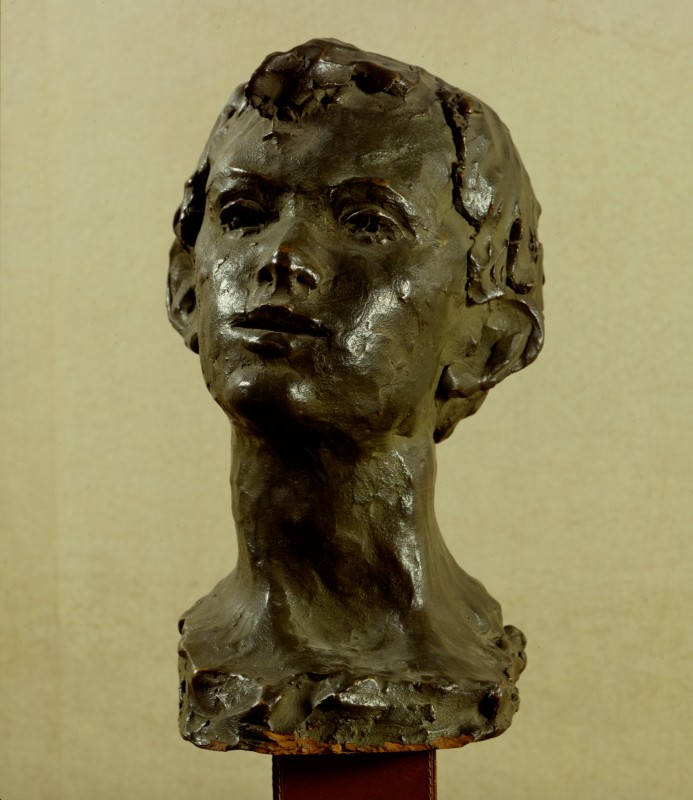
Testina di adolescente, ca. 1952 (Fondazione Cariplo)

Pietro Foglia (1913–1974) was an Italian sculptor born in Cremona.

== Biography ==
Foglia began his apprenticeship as a sculptor on completing his studies at the Ala Ponzone School of Applied Arts in Cremona. He moved to Rome in 1929 and then Turin in 1937, where he enrolled at the Albertina Academy to attend the courses of Felice Casorati. His debut came in 1939 at the Esposizione del Sindacato Interprovinciale Fascista organised by the Società Promotrice di Belle Arti in Turin. He returned to Cremona after serving in World War II and produced a large number of funerary works. Having moved to Switzerland in the 1950s, he enjoyed considerable success with private collectors, focusing above all on portraits, heads of adolescents and allegorical female figures. He also worked as a painter.

== Other projects ==
Media related to Pietro Foglia at Wikimedia Commons
