= Giorgio Belloni =

Italian painter (1861–1944)

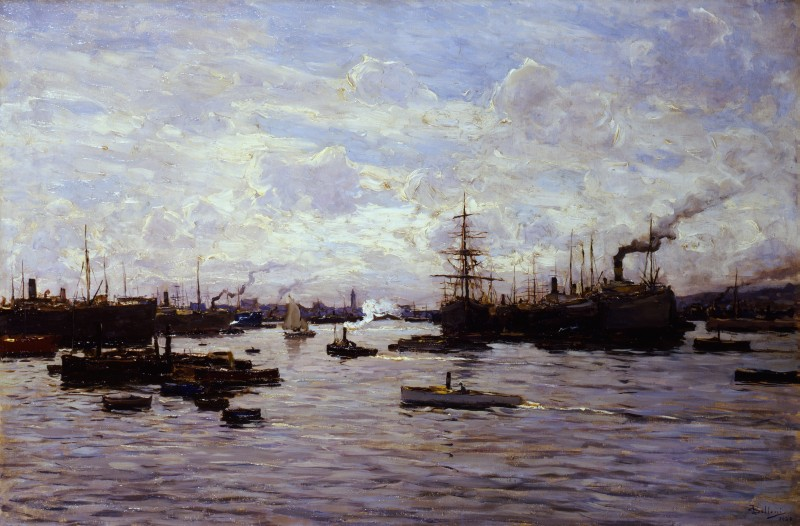
Meriggio nel porto, 1923 (Fondazione Cariplo)

Giorgio Belloni (Codogno (Lodi), 1861 – Azzano di Mezzegra (Como), 1944) was an Italian painter.

== Biography ==
A pupil of Giuseppe Bertini at the Brera Academy, Belloni made his debut in 1879 with two perspective views of interiors. After a stay in Verona, during which he painted his first landscapes en plein air, he settled in Milan, where he established himself as a landscape painter as from 1882. The success achieved in Venice at the Esposizione Nazionale Artistica di Venezia of 1887 made him known beyond the regional borders. He came under the influence of Lombard Naturalism as from the beginning of the 1880s and specialised in seascapes, painted from life during summer stays at Sturla, Noli and Forte dei Marmi but distinguished by a poetic and evocative atmosphere. While continuing to work primarily as a landscape painter, producing large-scale views of the Alpine area and Brianza, he also turned his hand to portraits and still lifes. The influence of Divisionism at the turn of the century was developed through his own interpretation of light. Belloni's assiduous participation in major exhibitions at the national and international level culminated in the allocation of a personal room at the Venice Biennale in 1914 and a show at the Galleria Pesaro in 1919.

== Other projects ==
Media related to Giorgio Belloni at Wikimedia Commons
