= Giovanni Antonio Emanueli =

Italian painter (1817–1894)

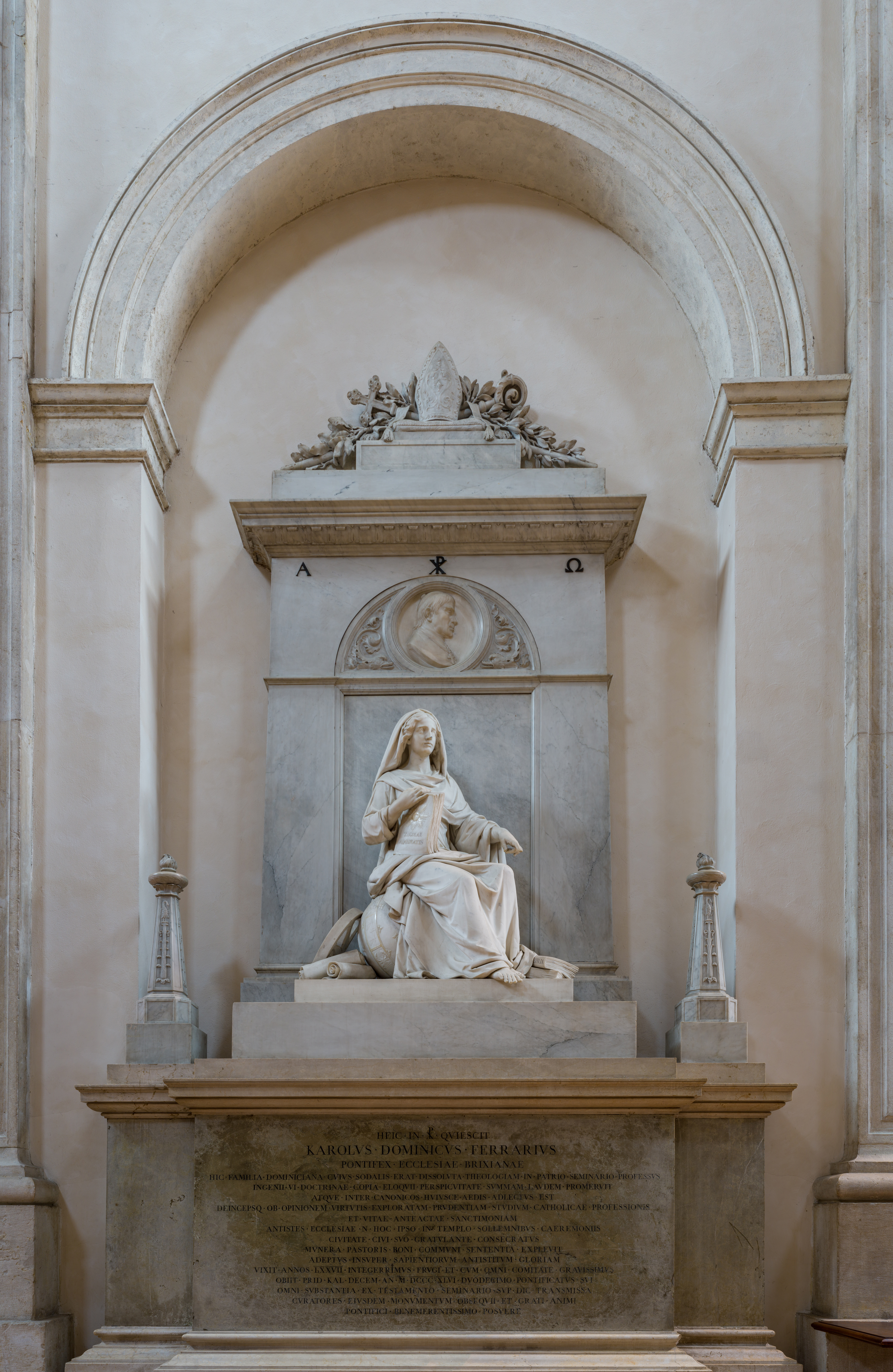
Funerary monument of Carlo Domenico Ferrari by Giovanni Antonio Emanueli in the New Cathedral in Brescia.

Giovanni Antonio Emanueli (1817–1894) was an Italian painter.

== Biography ==
Emanueli was born in Brescia. He enrolled at the Milan Academy of Fine Arts in 1831 and attended Antonio Durelli’s course of figure studies but was enabled to complete his training under the sculptor Abbondio Sangiorgio from 1833 on by a grant from the Brescia City Council. His youthful work shows the influence of the classically inspired models of his master and Rodolfo Vantini, with whom he collaborated repeatedly on important building projects in Brescia. He settled in Milan in 1842 but continued to send works from his repertoire of religious and funerary subjects, portraits and genre compositions to his hometown. He produced some sculptures for Milan Cathedral and the church of San Carlo al Corso in the period 1857–1869 and took part in the 4th Esposizione Nazionale di Belle Arti in Turin in 1880. The works of the artist’s mature period show the adoption of a naturalistic approach under the influence of Alessandro Puttinati, Giovanni Strazza and Antonio Tantardini. Emanueli died in 1894 in Milan.
