= Giorgio Baffo =

Venetian senator and poet

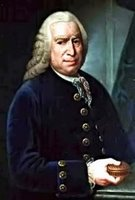
Giorgio Baffo

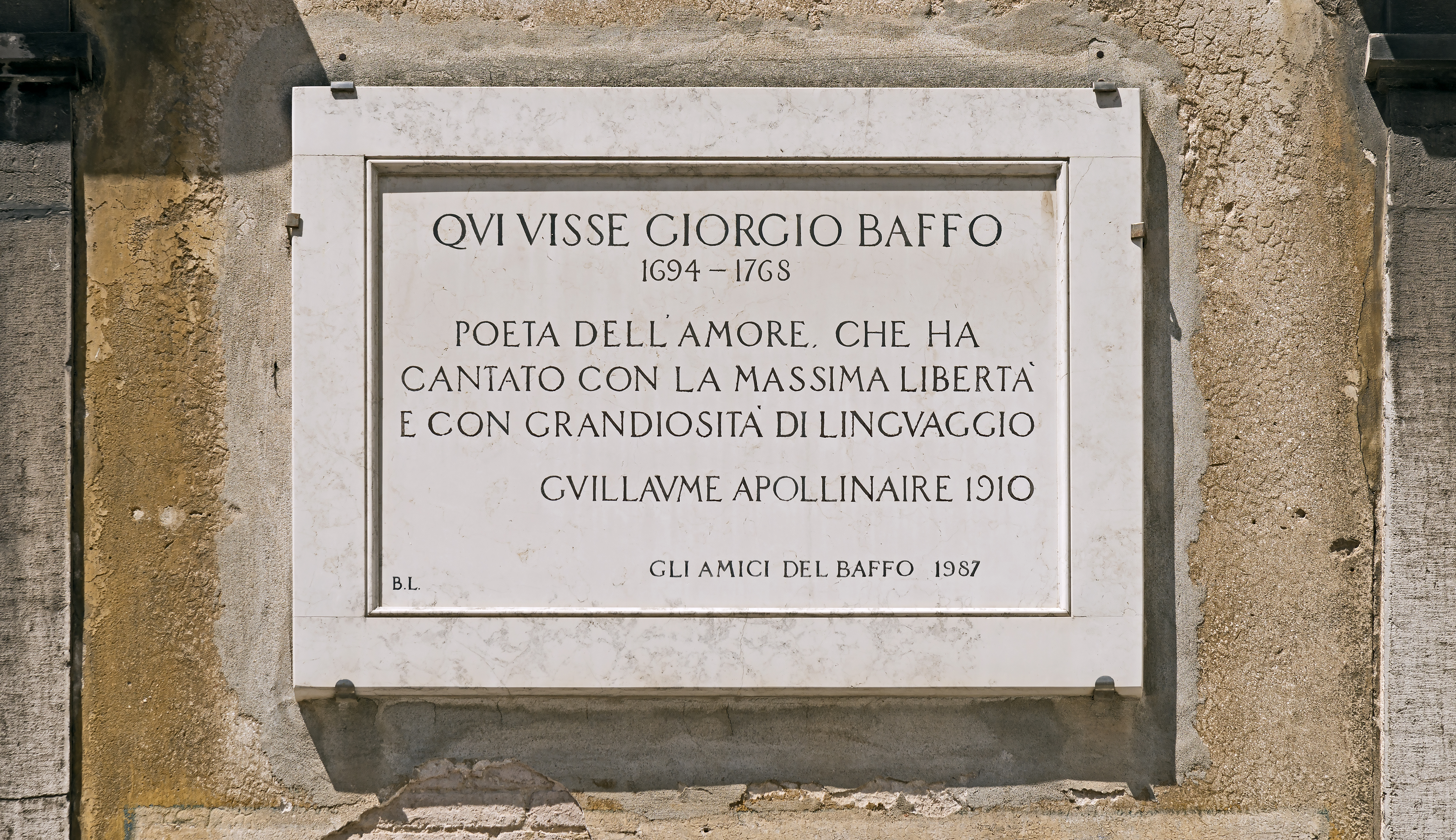
Plaque commemorating Giorgio Baffo on the facade of Palace Bellavite in Venice

Giorgio Alvise Baffo (Venetian: Zorzi Alvixe Baffo; 11 August 1694 – 30 July 1768) was a Venetian poet and senator of the Venetian Republic.

Born in Venice, Baffo was, like Ruzante, Carlo Goldoni and Berto Barbarani, a major writer in the Venetian language. He wrote many erotic sonnets. Baffo died in 1768 in the Palazzo Bellavite, Venice.
