= Emilio Longoni =

Italian painter

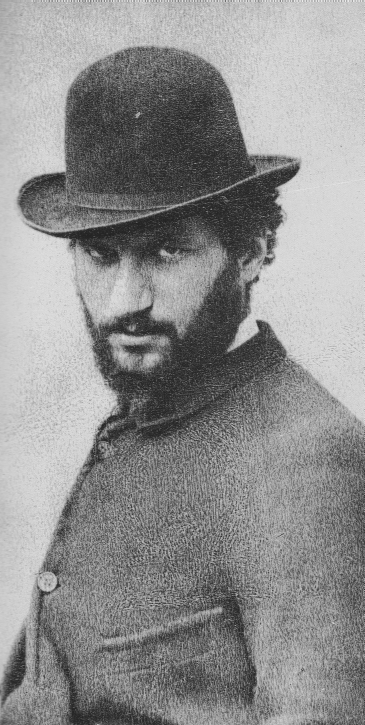
Emilio Longoni in 1890

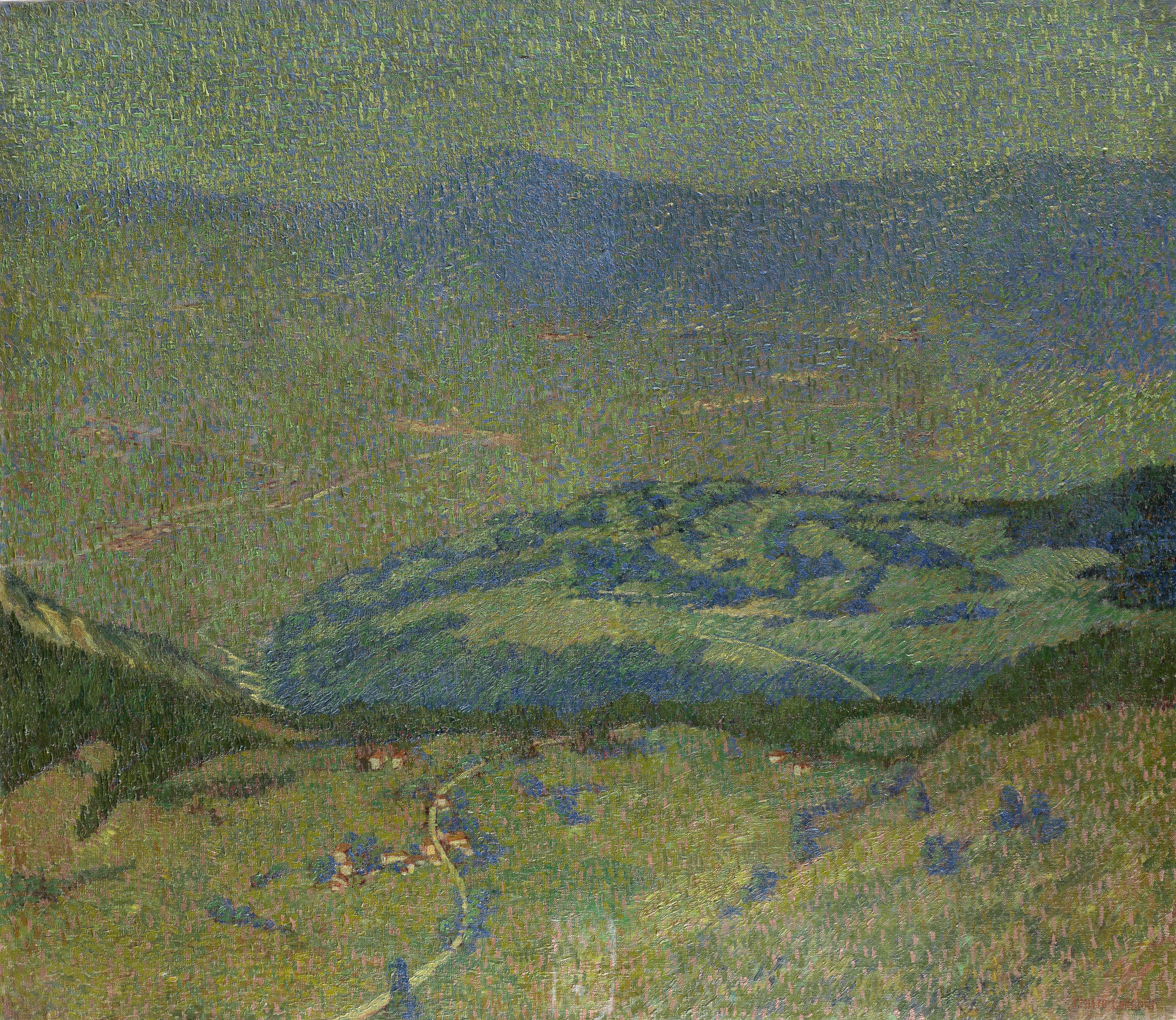
Emilio Longoni: Landscape in Valtellina

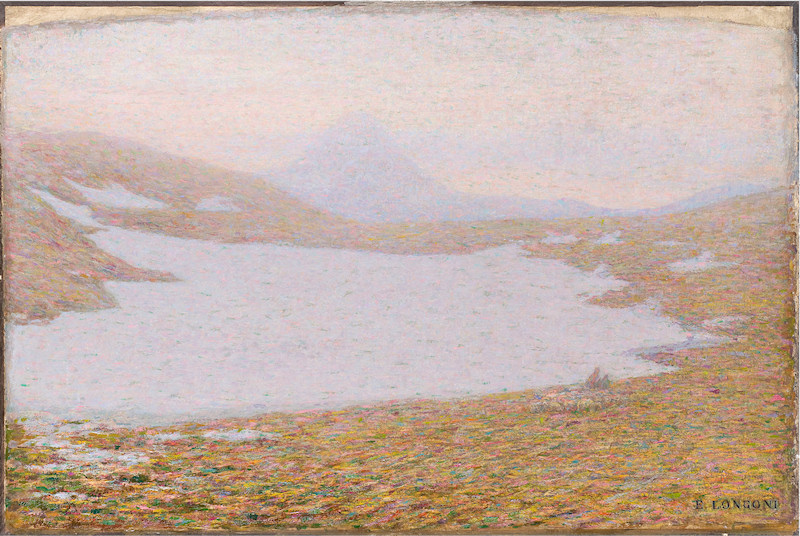
Primavera in alta montagna, 1912 ca. (Fondazione Cariplo)

Emilio Longoni (July 9, 1859 – November 29, 1932) was an Italian painter.

== Biography ==
He was born in Barlassina on July 9, 1859, fourth of twelve children, from Garibaldi’s volunteer and horseshoer Matteo Longoni and from tailor Luigia Meroni.

Since he was a child he felt a great passion for painting. After he finished elementary school he was sent to Milan to work as a boy. From 1875, he first studied at the night school of the Brera Academy. In 1876, he joined the regular courses, along with Gaetano Previati and Giovanni Segantini, with whom he shared a studio in 1882. He exhibits at the Brera in 1880 and 1882. He spent time in Naples and Brianza during the years 1880-1884; during this decade, he mainly painted still lifes. At the 1891 Brera Trienale, he displayed Oratore dello sciopero, his first Divisionist work. He moved on to painting landscapes.

In 1882 he met Giovanni Segantini, already his classmate in Brera, who introduced him to the brothers Alberto and Vittore Grubicy, owners of an art gallery that was active in promoting young artists. In 1886, he succeeded in renting a study in via della Stella, now via Corridoni 45. He started painting portraits and still lives for Milan aristocracy and middle class. Among his customers, there was the banker Giovanni Torelli, the collector Giuseppe Treves brother of the publisher Emilio Treves, the banker Lazzaro Donati. In 1891 he took part to the first Triennale of Brera with works that made him known to the public and the critics. He developed a divisionist style of painting.

Between 1900 and 1932 he took part to the most important Italian and international exhibitions. He developed an increasing connection to nature and got close to Buddhism, spending long periods painting in the mountains, mainly in the Bernina Range, where he painted many works from life.

After the first world war he shut himself up, his age forbade him to go to the high mountains while his painting became more and more immaterial. Far from exhibitions, he worked for few people with whom he had direct contact and kept away from art dealers. In 1928 he married his partner Fiorenza de Gaspari, whom he met in the house of Avv. Luigi Majno, one of his admirers.

Emilio Longoni's work has been offered at auction multiple times, with realized prices ranging from US$1,426 to US$335,910, depending on the size and medium of the artwork. Since 2002 the record price for this artist at auction is US$335,910 for natura morta con frutta candita e caramelle, studio dal vero, sold at Sotheby's Milan in 2007.

He died in his study on November 29, 1932, and was buried in the Cimitero Monumentale di Milano.

== Bibliography ==
- Giovanna Ginex, Emilio Longoni, Catalogo ragionato, Federico Motta Editore, Milano, 1995
- Giovanna Ginex, Emilio Longoni, Opere scelte e inediti, Federico Motta Editore, Milano, 2002 (ISBN 8871793722)
- Giovanna Ginex, Emilio Longoni. 2 Collezioni, Skira, Milano, 2009

== Works exhibited in Milan museums ==
- Alba nel ghiacciaio, Neve in alta montagna (1915–16), Pinacoteca di Brera, arrived from Lazzaro Donati’s collection
- Studio dal vero, Cocomeri e Poponi (1886), Galleria d'Arte
- Gamberi e fiaschi, Natura morta comn fiaschi e gamberi, 1886
- Melanconie, Fanciulla triste (1895), Galleria d'Arte Moderna
- Trasparenze alpine (1910), Galleria d'Arte Moderna
- Ghiacciaio (1912), Galleria d'Arte Moderna
- Disillusa, Paesaggio alpino (1914), Galleria d'Arte Moderna
- Goletta di alta montagna, Mountain Landscape (1915–20), Galleria d'Arte Moderna
- Ultima neve, Residui di neve, Paesaggio alpino (1920), Galleria d'Arte Moderna
- Augusto Donati (1903), Museo Martinitt e Stelline, corso Magenta 57,
- Primavera in alta montagna (1912), Gallerie di Piazza Scala
