= Luigi Conconi =

Italian painter (1852–1917)

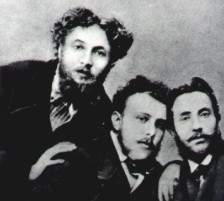
- Emilio Praga, Carlo Dossi and Luigi Conconi
- Born: 30 May 1852; Milan, Kingdom of Lombardy–Venetia
- Died: 23 January 1917 (aged 64); Milan, Kingdom of Italy
- Education: Polytechnic University of Milan
- Known for: Painting, printmaking
- Movement: Scapigliatura

Luigi Conconi (30 May 1852 – 23 January 1917) was an Italian painter, printmaker, illustrator and architect. He is considered a leading figure of the Scapigliatura movement.

== Biography ==
Luigi Conconi (30 May 1852, Milan, 23 January 1917, Milan) was an Italian painter, architect, graphic artist and book illustrator whose protean artistic imagination led to his being one of the most important figures in the cultural transfer to modernism that characterized Italy in the early part of the twentieth century. Conconi was a graduate of the Polytechnic University of Milan, and his background was in architecture, where he was involved early in designing the Palazzo Turati (Luigi Conconi, 2025). But his extreme suggestions of mass monuments, e.g., the statue to Victor Emmanuel II and to the Five Days of Milan, were not adopted, and this set him on the path of a more communicative art form (British Museum, 2017).

Along with other characters such a Tranquillo Cremona and Gaetano Previati, Conconi shared the anti-conformist spirit of the Scapigliatura, creating a somewhat romantic symbolism with an experimental approach (Artvee, 2024). In his works, the artist demonstrated his taste to sombre atmospheres and dreamlike imagery. A member of the artistic life of Milan, he helped found, with Giuseppe Glauco and Guerino Meschino, a satirical journal, Guerino Meschino, and was a member of La Famiglia Artistica (Internet Archive, 2022). He is renowned in architecture, having completed some of the iconic projects such as the Villa Pisani Dossi and Chapter Segre (THETIS Srl Grafica - Multimedia, 2020).

A pioneer of print, Conconi combined etching and monotype techniques, as well as illustrated other books by Carlo Dossi and Emile Zola. His exhibitions were controversial, but became internationally acclaimed in some extent, as well as his legacy that continues to be in the process of artistic progress in Italy of the late 19th and early 20th centuries.

=== Early life and architectural beginnings ===
Luigi Conconi was born in Milan on 30 May 1852, when the Kingdom of LombardyVenetia was going through political turmoil. He received an architectural education at the Accademia di Brera and subsequently entered the Politecnico di Milano--institutions that produced the intellectual and artistic elite (northern Italy). He received a classical education in design but Conconi soon showed himself to be fond of unconventional design, mixing things up, as was evidenced by rising to prominence (Cambedda, 2023).

Among his first professional works was a short and collaborative work on the Palazzo Turati, a neo-Renaissance work commissioned by the Turati family. His role was minor; however, the experience introduced him to the upper echelons of architectural circles of Milan and the bureaucracy of the state commissions (Rocaille, 2013). Conconi then (1880) presented a project of a monument to the memory of the five days of Milan, a revolutionary movement against the Austrian occupation. His initiative, which also included allegorical figures and asymmetrical shapes, was too radical and had to be declined (Rocaille, 2013). Not dismayed, he took part in another competition in 1881 against a monument to King Victor Emmanuel II in Rome. Even this design was rejected-although supported in culture by men such as Carlo Borghi and Luca Beltrami, the weekly Guerin Meschino (Cambedda, 2023). These failures became the turning point in the career of Conconi, as he gave up traditional architecture to concentrate more on expressive visual art that was expressive. At this transition period, Conconi started trying with architectural etchings and hallucinatory drawings by combining structural accuracy and surrealistic imagery (Cambedda, 2023). His previous background in architecture showed through in his later works, which tended to contain gothic arches, wrecked chapels and symbolic spatial designs. This is how he would be able to combine fields, all of which became classic of his style and made him distinguish himself among his peers and preface his works in the movement of Scapigliatura (Cambedda, 2023).

=== Artistic Community and Experimentation ===
Conconi began to move in avant-garde groupings in Milan, joining La Famiglia Artistica in 1881: this was a group of progressive artists who organized satiric events, including Indisposizione artistica. In 1882, together with Guido Pisani Dossi, Luca Beltrami and others, he created a literary review, Guerino Meschino (Artsupp, 2025). Until 1885, he had shared a studio with Gaetano Previati, with whom he had experimented with medieval legends and nocturne subjects. They combined efforts and aimed at symbolic narration by means of art. With his plan of a polyptych “Fiabe e Leggende”, Conconi tried to contrast a symbolic meaning day and night, but the work was not finished (Rocaille, 2013).

=== Controversies and Exhibitions ===
The work of Conconi was usually controversial. His Intermezzo, which he had shown uncompleted at the first show of the Societa per le Belle Arti ed Esposizione Permanente, in 1886, had evoked divided responses. Three pictures exhibited in the 1887 Esposizione Nazionale in Venice aroused no less a controversy (Cambedda, 2023). Irrespective of those tensions, Conconi worked in the field of urban planning and monumental art. He co-operated in 1891 with the sculptor Paolo Troubetzkoy in a statue of Dante at Trento, and in 1892 suggested one to Prince Amedeo at Turin--in neither was his invention fulfilled. In 1894, he created a diorama of the life of Dante that was left incomplete (Cambedda, 2023).

=== Later career and personal life ===
Following his marriage in 1897, Luigi Conconi devoted himself to domestic life, education and public service, sitting as a Milan city councillor between 1899 and 1904 (Cambedda, 2023). Even with the financial problems, he continued to be an artist, showing in selective semi-private shows and attracting attention overseas, receiving an award in Paris in 1900 and Munich in 1913. He never lost his interest in printmaking, and during his career, he was an innovator in experiments on etchings, which tended to be monotype-like (Mattia Jona, 2025). Through this experimental technique, he was able to capture air effects and emotional expression, making his work to go beyond those of other traditional printmakers and thus earning him a reputation of being a visionary in the Scapigliatura school (Cambedda, 2023).

== Scapigliatura ==
After collaborating briefly in the construction of the Palazzo Turati in Milan, Conconi entered two competitions for public monuments: the first, in 1880, to commemorate the Five Days of Milan; the second, in 1881, to King Victor Emmanuel II, in Rome. His unorthodox proposals were refused, despite support from the writer Carlo Dossi, the painter Vittore Grubicy de Dragon and others. Embittered by failure, Conconi turned to painting with Tranquillo Cremona, who was associated with the Scapigliatura, an Italian literary and artistic movement.

Conconi’s early works reflect the influence of Cremona and of Daniele Ranzoni: Children in the Garden (priv. col.) and Sick Girl. Around 1880, Conconi painted House of the Wizard (priv. col.), also treated as an etching, inspired by the discovery of a ruined church and by his collection of stuffed animals and other curiosities. His visionary works caused a sensation at the Brera exhibition of 1880.

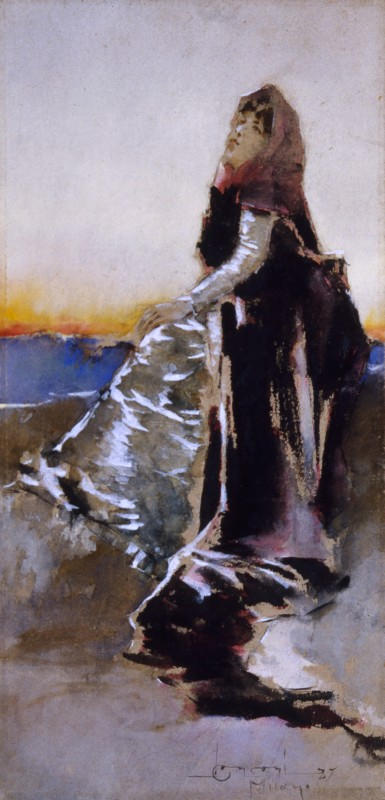
Visione romantica, Artgate Fondazione Cariplo

In 1892, Conconi sought to participate in Joséphin Péladan’s Salon de la Rose + Croix in Paris. In 1881, Conconi joined the artists’ group La Famiglia Artistica in Milan, where he took an active part in planning burlesques such as the Indisposizione artistica, held that year. In 1882, together with Guido Pisani Dossi, Luca Beltrami and other writers, he founded the spirited review Guerino Meschino.

Despite criticism, Conconi continued to exhibit in Italy and abroad for the next 15 years. Like the painter Gaetano Previati, with whom he shared a studio until 1885, he frequently developed subjects from fables and medieval legends and painted nocturnal subjects. Conconi also planned a polyptych, Fables and Legends, in which phases of the day and night were to be symbolically contrasted in a series of paintings. The project was abandoned, however.

Another painting, Intermezzo, was exhibited ‘unfinished’ at the inaugural exhibition of the Società per le Belle Arti ed Esposizione Permanente in Milan in 1886, where it provoked heated discussion. Further controversy greeted the three paintings Conconi showed at the Esposizione Nazionale in Venice in 1887. The same year, he was commissioned to devise a plan for the reorganization of the Foro Bonaparte in Milan. He collaborated with the sculptor Paolo Troubetzkoy in a competition for a monument to Dante in Trento in 1891 and for a monument to Prince Amedeo in Turin in 1892, in both cases without success. He also worked, in 1894, on a diorama of the life of Dante; this was left unfinished.

Three of his architectural projects were realized, however: the Villa Pisani Dossi (1897–8) on Lake Como; the tomb of the poet Felice Cavallotti (1898) at Dagnente, Lake Maggiore; and the Segre chapel (1900) in the Cimitero Monumentale di Milano.

== Later works ==
Disillusioned and never financially solvent, after 1895, Conconi exhibited only by invitation. After his marriage in 1897, he dedicated himself increasingly to family life, to teaching and (as a city councillor for Milan from 1899 to 1904) to civic administration. However, he continued painting and exhibiting and received prizes in Paris in 1900 and in Munich in 1913. Throughout his life, he devoted much research to etching: his experimental printing techniques often effectively created monotypes. Conconi also illustrated books by Carlo Dossi (e.g. Amori, Milan, 1887), Alphonse Daudet (e.g. Tartarin sur les Alpes, Paris, 1890), Émile Zola (La Faute de l'Abbé Mouret, Paris, 1890) and other contemporary writers.

== Gallery ==
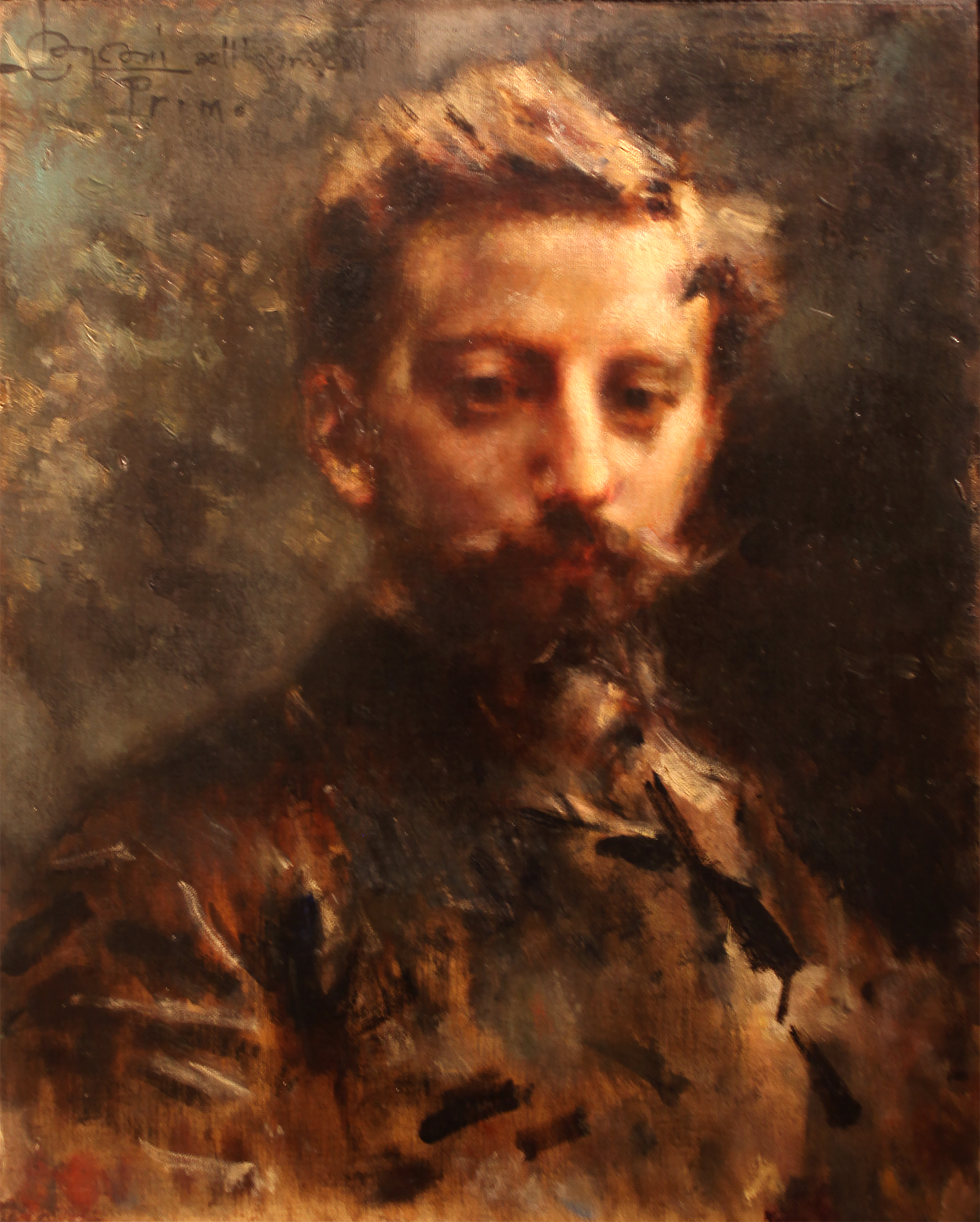
Portrait of Primo Levi, Galleria d'Arte Moderna, Milan

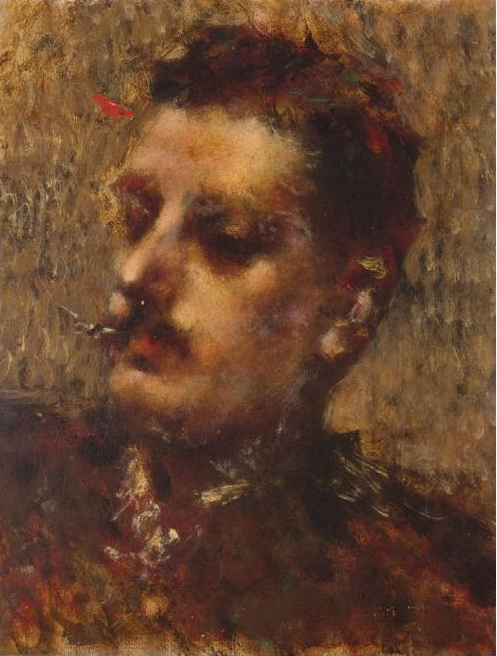
Portrait of Giacomo Puccini, Fondazione Puccini, Lucca

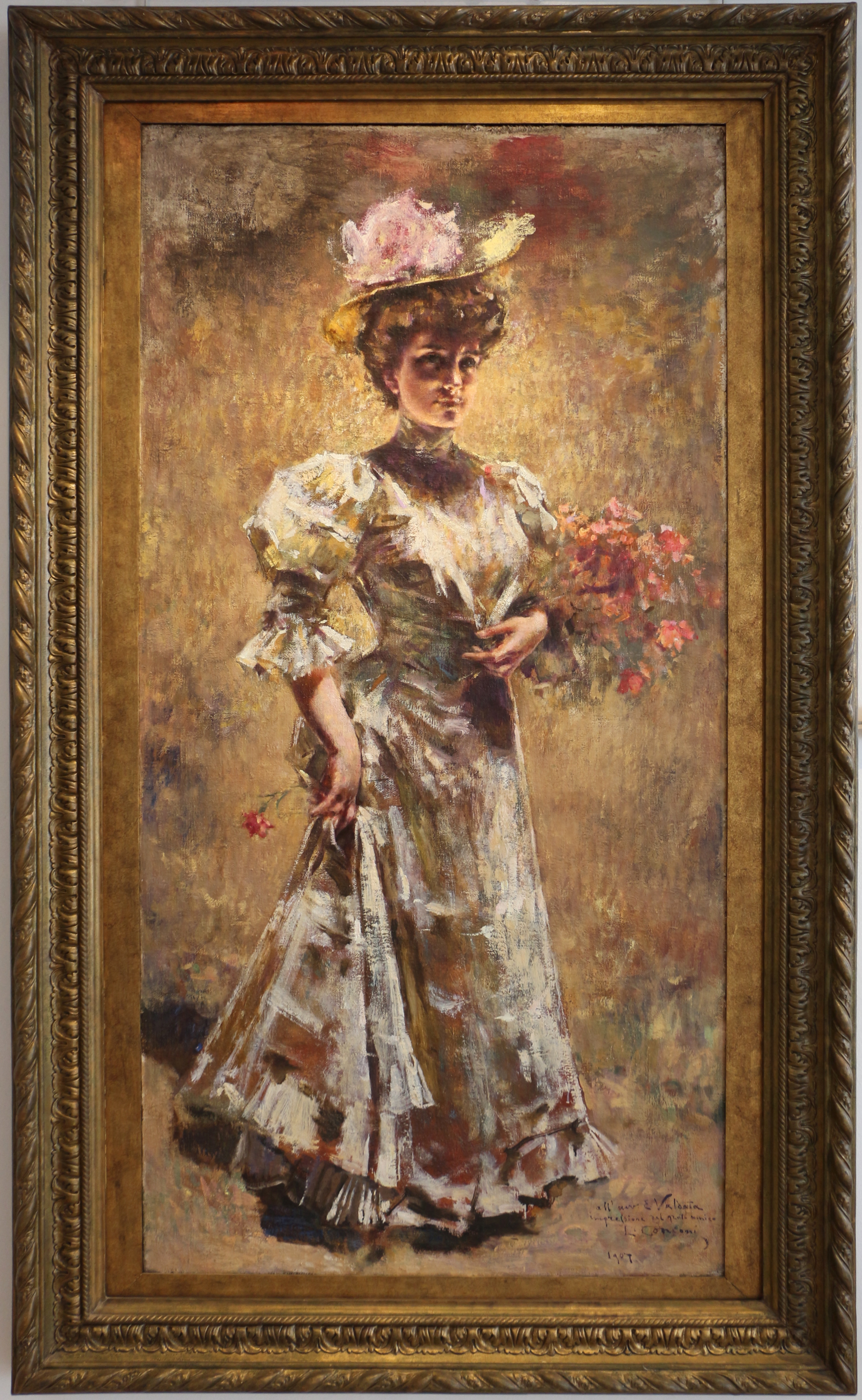
Portrait of Ada Valdata, Raccolte Frugone, Genoa

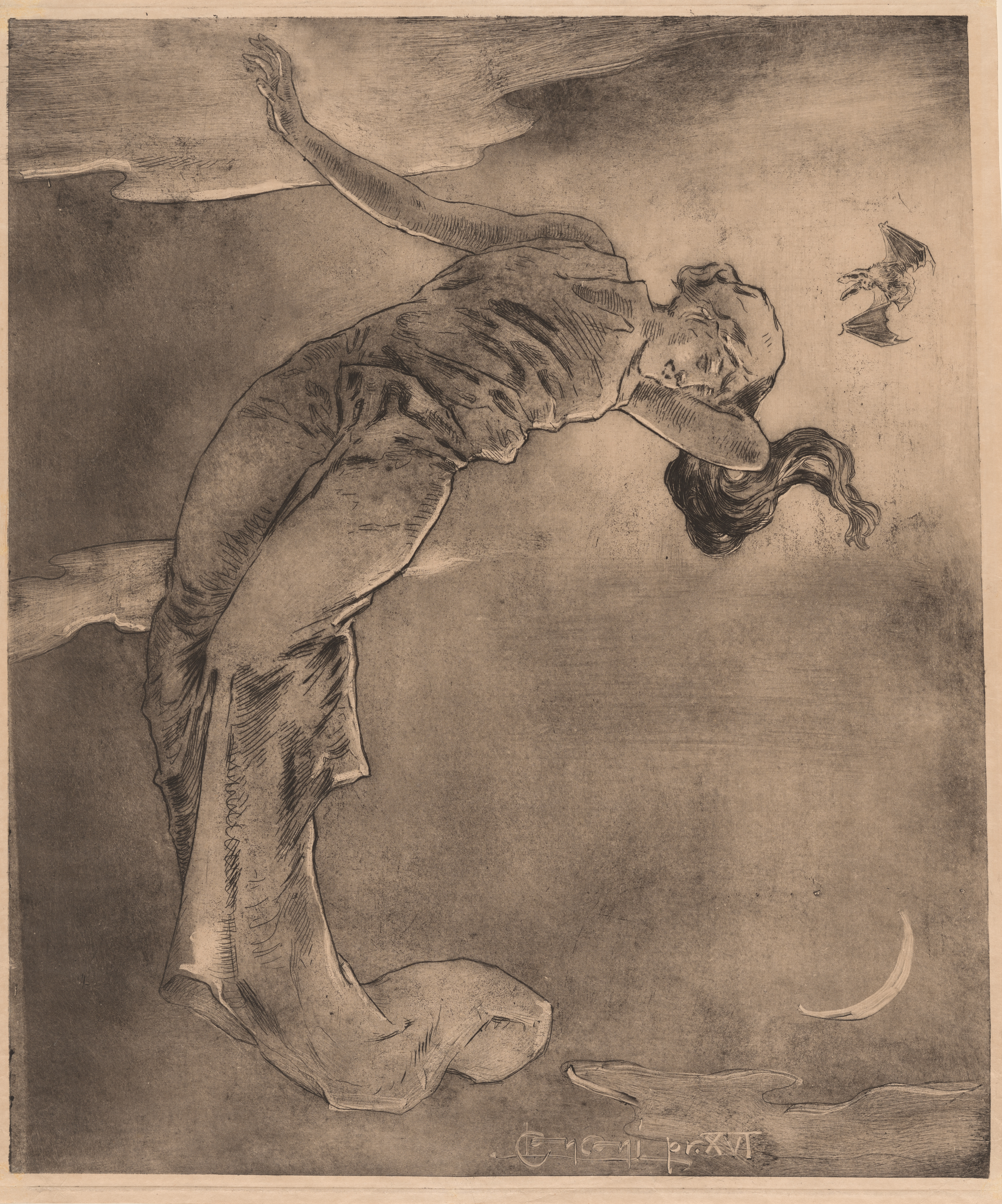
The Wave, National Gallery of Art, Washington, D.C.

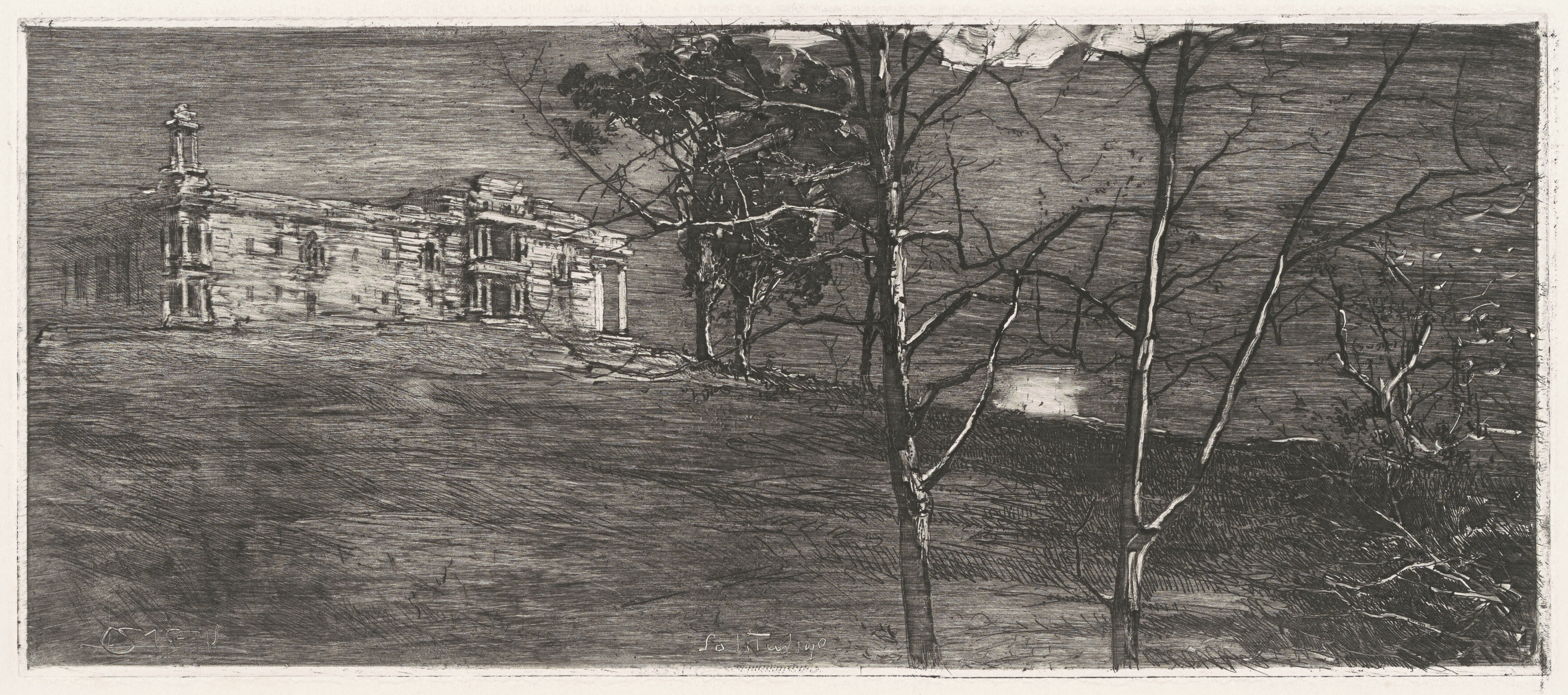
Solitude, National Gallery of Art, Washington, D.C.

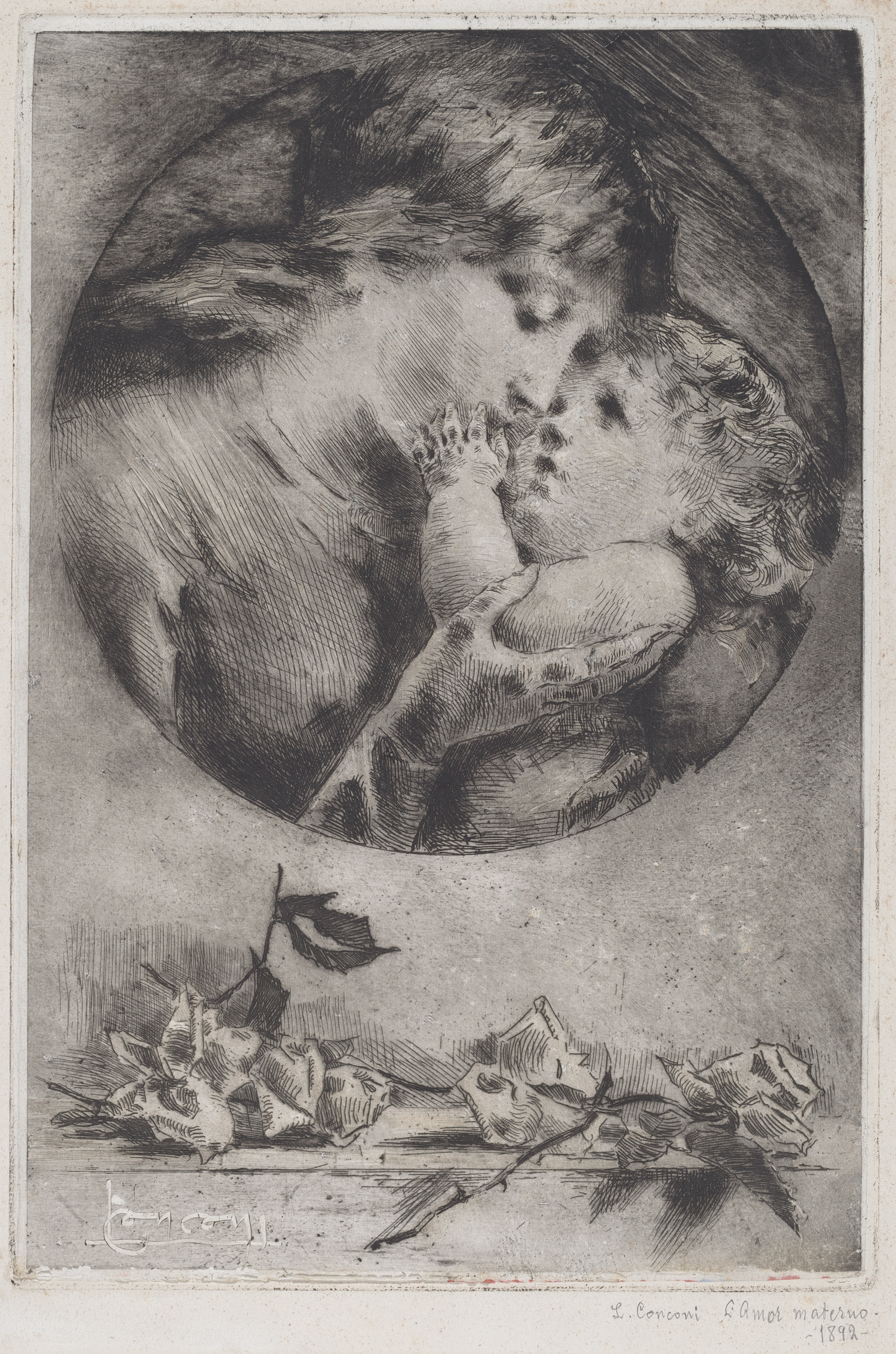
Maternal Love, National Gallery of Art, Washington, D.C.

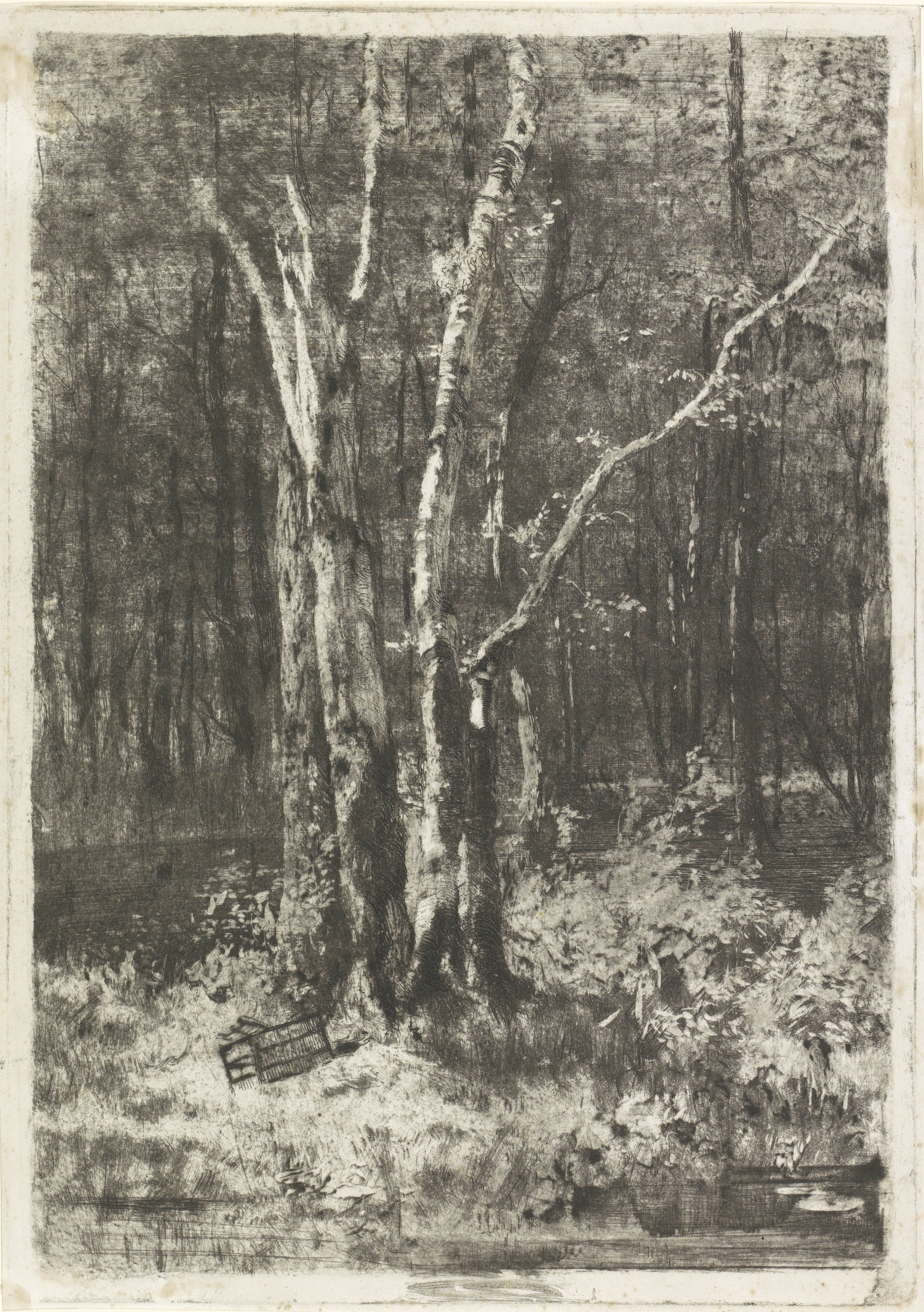
The forest, Rijksmuseum, Amsterdam

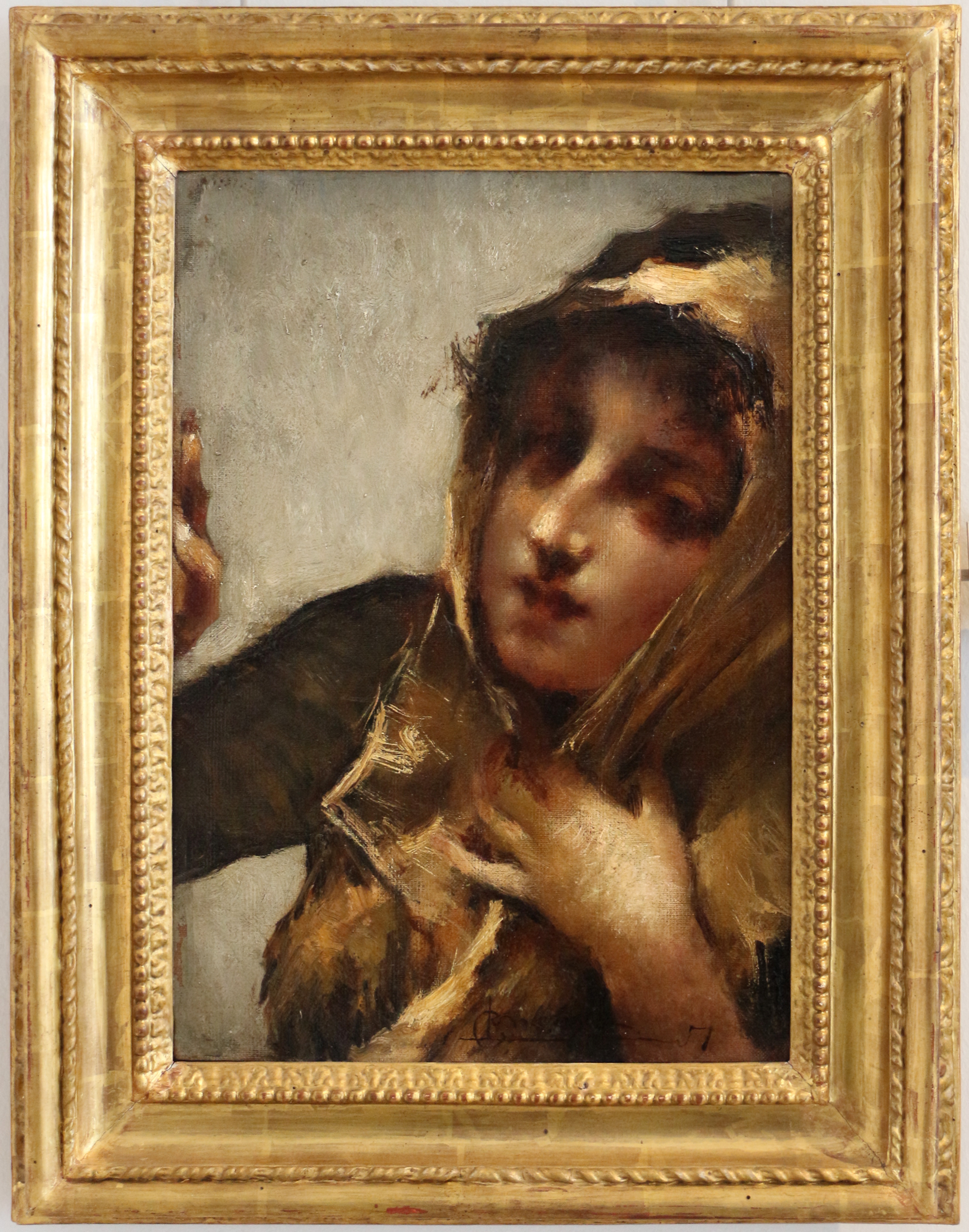
Woman at the window, Raccolte Frugone, Genoa

== Sources ==
- Luigi Conconi, online catalogue Artgate by Fondazione Cariplo, 2010, CC BY-SA (source for the first revision of this article).
- Artsupp (2025) Medieval motif, Luigi Conconi Artsupp. 2025 [online]. Available from: https://artsupp.com/en/artists/luigi-conconi/motivo-medioevale [Accessed 7 July 2025].
- Artvee (2024) Luigi Conconi - Artvee Artvee. 2024 [online]. Available from: https://artvee.com/artist/luigi-conconi/ [Accessed 7 July 2025].
- British Museum (2017) Collections Online | British Museum Britishmuseum.org. 2017 [online]. Available from: https://www.britishmuseum.org/collection/term/BIOG136899 [Accessed 7 July 2025].
- Internet Archive (2022) Dizionario biografico degli Italiani : Free Download, Borrow, and Streaming : Internet Archive Internet Archive. 2022 [online]. Available from: https://archive.org/details/dizionariobiogra0000unse [Accessed 7 July 2025].
- ‘Luigi Conconi’ (2025) Hellenicaworld.com. 2025 [online]. Available from: https://www.hellenicaworld.com/Art/Paintings/en/LuigiConconi.html [Accessed 7 July 2025].
- ‘Luigi Conconi in the Biographical Dictionary of Italians volume 27’ (2023) Treccani. 2023 [online]. Available from: http://www.treccani.it/enciclopedia/luigi-conconi_(Dizionario-Biografico)/ [Accessed 7 July 2025].
- Mattia Jona (2025) Mattia Jona - LUIGI CONCONI - LANDSCAPE WITH BUSHES AND CLOUDS Mattiajona.com. 2025 [online]. Available from: https://www.mattiajona.com/schede.php?t=1&i=f3b509fbc8d1af141bbd3dfc341a88da&c=conconi [Accessed 7 July 2025].
- Rocaille (2013) Luigi Conconi Rocaille - A Blog about Decadence, Kitsch and Godliness. 29 October 2013 [online]. Available from: https://www.rocaille.it/luigi-conconi/ [Accessed 7 July 2025].
- THETIS Srl Grafica - Multimedia (2020) CONCONI LUIGI : Luigi Conconi - Asta Dal Rinascimento al Primo ’900 Percorso attraverso 5 secoli di pittura | DIPINTI DEL SECOLO XIX - Associazione Nazionale - Case d’Asta italiane Anca-aste.it. 2020 [online]. Available from: https://www.anca-aste.it/it/asta-0533/luigi-conconi.asp [Accessed 7 July 2025].

== Other projects ==
Media related to Luigi Conconi at Wikimedia Commons
