= Alfredo Soressi =

Italian painter

- Born: 1897; Mucinasso, Piacenza, Italy
- Died: 1982 (aged 84–85); Piacenza, Italy

Alfredo Soressi (1897 – 1982) was an Italian painter, eclectic in subjects.

== Biography ==
Born in Mucinasso, frazione of Piacenza, in 1897, he initially trained under Francesco Ghittoni at the Istituto Gazzola of Piacenza, but then traveled to Milan to study at the Brera Academy under Mentessi, Bignami, and Pellini. After the World War I, he obtained a diploma as an architect, but for many years (1925 - 1958) he taught ornamentation at the Istituto Gazzola.

In his will, he left many of his works to the Galleria Ricci Oddi of Piacenza. Among his architectural works, he designed the Casa del Mutilato in Piacenza, the Palazzo del Comune in Farini d'Olmo, and the Villaggio degli artisti in Bosconure.

== Awards ==
- 1957: Mostra d'Arte Pura di Napoli, Naples gold medal
- 1958: Antibiennale, Rome gold medal
