= Casa del Mutilato, Piacenza =

Coordinates: 45.05590°N 9.69327°E

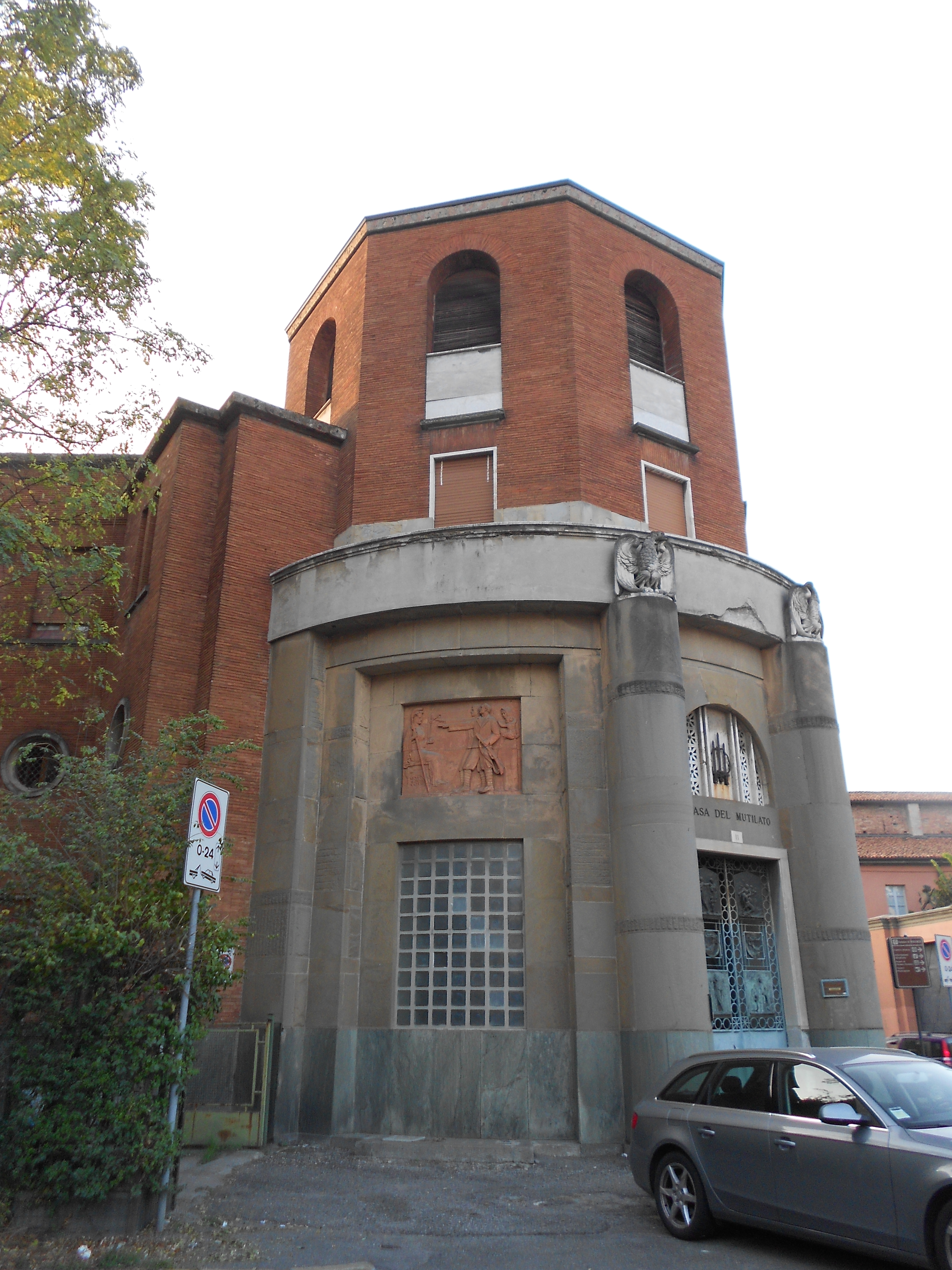
Entrance to Casa del Mutilato

The Casa del Mutilato is a government office located on Piazza Alessandro Casali #11, adjacent to the former Chiesa del Carmine, in Piacenza, region of Emilia-Romagna, Italy. The building, erected during 1939–1941 to house offices of the Associazione Nazionale fra Mutilati ed Invalidi di Guerra (ANMIG), which aided men wounded in Italian wars. It also serves as a chapel or monument. The building designed by Alfredo Soressi, and is peppered with fascist imagery and reliefs honoring patriotic sacrifice.

The entrance consists of a cylindrical projection with a portal flanked by two severe columns topped by eagles, recalling the Aquila atop some Ancient Roman standards. Above the door is a heraldic shield with three swords. The metal gate at the entrance has relief panels of soldiers leaving their family, and being rescued in battle. The walls and columns are given detail by rusticated surfaces.
