= Chiesa del Carmine, Piacenza =

Former church in Emilia-Romagna, Italy

Coordinates: 45.05577°N 9.69323°E

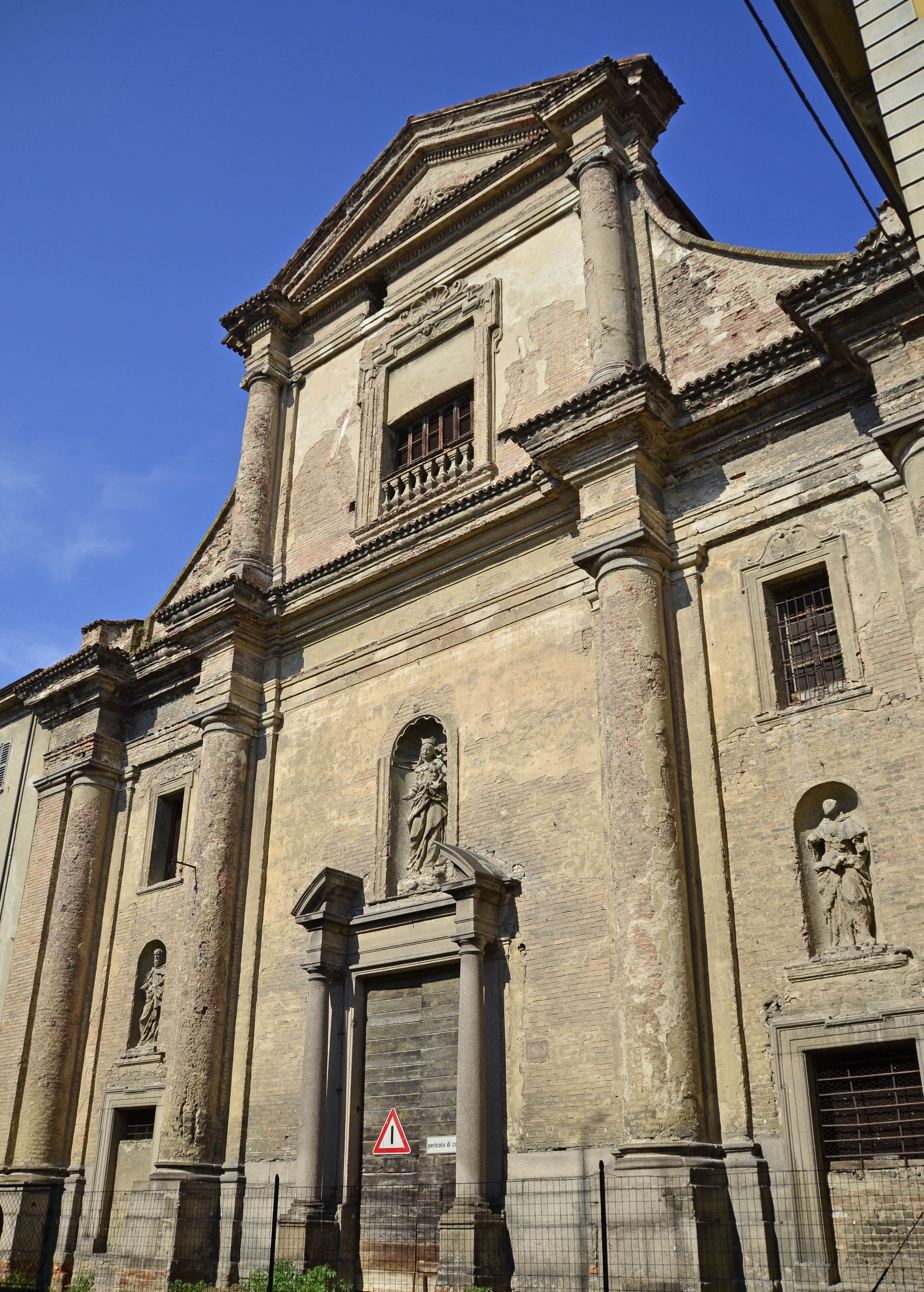

The former Chiesa del Carmine (Church of the Carmine Order) is a Baroque style, now deconsecrated Roman Catholic church, located at Piazza Cassali #10, adjacent to the Casa del Mutilato in Piacenza, Region of Emilia Romagna, Italy. The space is now used for communal use administered by Laboratorio Aperto Piacenza.

== History ==
A church was built at this site in 1334 by the Mendicant order of Carmelite monks; this church was oriented in the opposite orientation with the entrance portal to the east and the apse in the west. In the seventeenth century a major refurbishment inverted the orientation. The church and the order was suppressed in 1805, and the church was used first as a hospital then a warehouse, while the adjacent convent became a barracks and in 1807, an abattoir. By 1923, convent and church buildings were utilized as offices of the Fascist party. The church was abandoned by 2006. In 2017, a project for restoration of the church was begun and completed two years later. During the restorations portions of a Roman era mosaic pavement were discovered.
