= Gaetano Previati =

Italian painter (1852–1920)

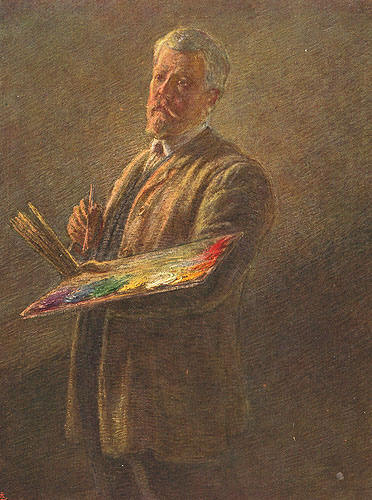
- Self-portrait (1911)
- Born: 31 August 1852; Ferrara, Kingdom of Italy
- Died: 21 June 1920 (aged 67); Lavagna, Kingdom of Italy
- Education: Brera Academy in Milan
- Known for: Painting
- Movement: Divisionism, Symbolism
- Patrons: Vittore Grubicy de Dragon

Signature
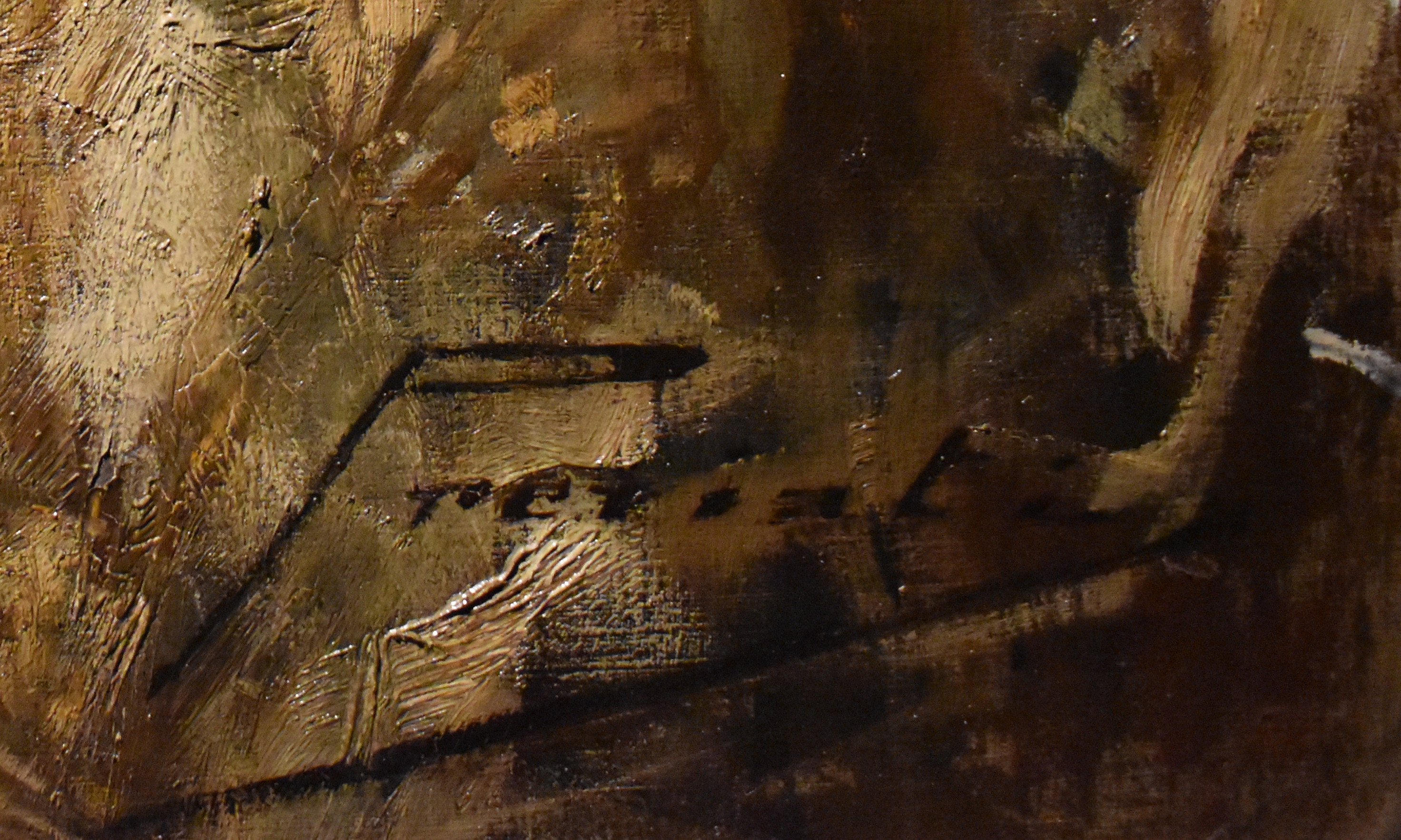

Gaetano Previati (31 August 1852 – 21 June 1920) was an Italian Symbolist painter in the Divisionist style and art theorist.

== Biography ==
=== Study and early works ===
Gaetano Previati was born into a moderately prosperous family and completed his first studies in the technical school at Ferrara, later graduating to the advanced technical institute. After a year, however, he left the institute to enrol in the School of Fine Arts at the Ateneo Civico, studying the works of the Renaissance masters in the local art gallery.

After military service (1873–5) in Livorno, he returned to Ferrara where the death of his father had brought a deterioration in the family's circumstances. With financial assistance, partly from the authorities and partly from his brother Giuseppe Previati, he moved to Florence, where he was the pupil of Amos Cassioli.

In November 1876, however, attracted by the work of Lombard artists, particularly Giuseppe Bertini, he moved to Milan and enrolled in the life drawing class at the Brera Academy. Here, apart from Giuseppe Mentessi, a childhood friend, his companions included Leonardo Bazzaro and Cesare Tallone. In Milan Previati studied under Giuseppe Bertini, Giovanni Morelli, and Federico Faruffini. In 1878, in the company of Mentessi, he travelled to Paris for the Exposition Universelle.

His studies at the Brera were marked by various successes, including the Canonica prize in 1879 for a large-scale history painting, Hostages of Crema (1.37×2.24 m; Milan, Brera). In the compositional complexity of the various figures, especially the carefully studied nudes, Previati's solid academic training was evident. The influence of Hans Makart, whose work Previati perhaps knew through engravings, seems likely here. Previati's approach, however, also reveals a desire to emphasize the complexity of layout by means of contrasting light effects and by the careful portrayal of the half shadows from which the figures emerge, features that became even more prominent in later works such as Oporto (1884; Rome, Galleria Nazionale d'Arte Moderna).

=== Gli Scapigliati and first Divisionist works ===
In 1881 Previati decided to settle in Milan. He established links with Scapigliatura painters, particularly Giuseppe Mentessi and Luigi Conconi. With the latter Previati planned to decorate the Castano Primo Cemetery with frescoes depicting episodes from the Way of the Cross. Eventually, however, Previati carried out this work alone (frescoes 1882–9; now Castano Primo, town hall). Previati's links with Scapigliati circles tempted him to tackle historical themes of a more dramatic and fantastical nature, as in Cleopatra (1887; Galleria d'Arte Moderna, Milan) and Paolo and Francesca (1887; Bergamo, Accademia Carrara). Here he tried to convey emotional relationships by means of vibrant effects of light and colour.

In 1886–87, at Milan and Turin, he exhibited the patriotic historical painting titled Tiremm innanz (Fire away). The canvas depicts the execution of the patriot Amatore Sciesa, who had been active in the rebellion in Milan against Austrian rule. The political overtones of his works causes controversy with the government; for example, an award given to his Cleopatra was withdrawn by the Academic Council of Milan. At Venice, in 1887, he exhibited L'Haschich and at the 1888 National Exhibition of Fine Arts of Bologna: Christ and the Magdalen; Oporto and Le fumatrici di haschisch.

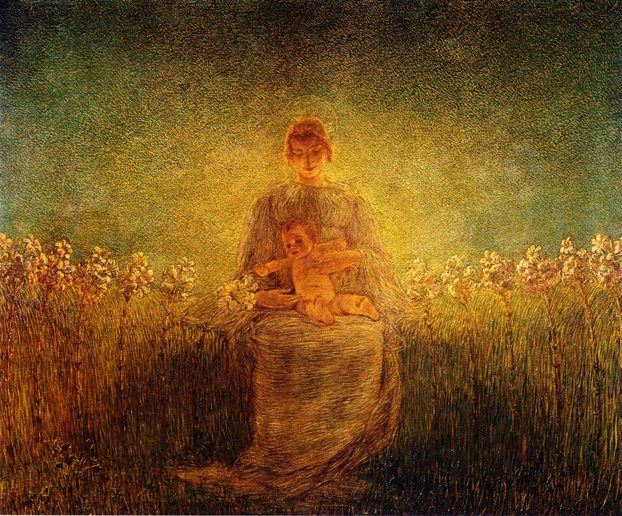
Madonna of the Lilies

In this period Previati also embarked on a series of illustrations for literary works, for example Edgar Allan Poe’s Tales (edition of 1890), where he used pools of swirling shade to create an oppressive or exalted mood. His work here is comparable to much Symbolist printmaking from this time. Such work was not well received by the critics; and Previati provoked further heated discussion when he exhibited at the first Brera Triennale the large Motherhood (1.74×4.11 m, 1890–91). The work was, however, subsequently shown at the Salon de la Rose + Croix group exhibition in Paris in 1892. At Vittore Grubicy de Dragon’s suggestion, Previati adopted a Divisionist style of brushwork in this painting, in order to achieve more vibrant lighting effects. The fact of motherhood was thus transformed from a natural episode into a spiritual idea: a single compositional entity is established, held together by the luminous streaks of greyish blue, so that sky, earth and angelic and human figures are one. The Divisionist technique of applying colour in separate threads and dots does not produce here an image of greater figurative truth or greater optical luminosity: rather, it creates an aura that envelops the whole scene, increasing the ‘ideal’ nature of the image.

It was this quality that fascinated Vittore Grubicy, who made it the hallmark of the art that he called ideista, which he believed to possess the greatest possible persuasive powers. Previati subsequently applied the technique, increasing its decorative potential, to such works as Madonna of the Lilies (1894; Galleria d'Arte Moderna, Milan).

=== Further developments and research ===
Even though his art became the subject of frequent critical comment and the appearance of his works invariably excited public interest, Previati sold very few paintings and had to rely for survival on the monthly allowance sent him by his brother, a hydraulic engineer, in Ferrara. In order to improve his financial position he had the idea of creating, in collaboration with other artists, a panorama (for the Milan exhibitions of 1894) representing Dante’s Inferno by paintings and a variety of mechanical devices. This plan, however, came to nothing.

In 1895 he entered the competition announced by the publishers Hoepli for the illustrations of a new edition of Alessandro Manzoni's novel The Betrothed, which was published in 1900. He worked on this project for two years and completed 268 drawings, which at the end of 1897 won the 9000 lire prize. In 1898 Vittore Grubicy’s brother, Alberto Grubicy, offered Previati a ten-year contract with his gallery, and this enabled Previati to overcome, at last, his financial difficulties. The death of Giovanni Segantini in 1899 heightened Alberto Grubicy’s interest in Previati among Divisionist artists. Previati was thus able to devote himself wholeheartedly to his work.

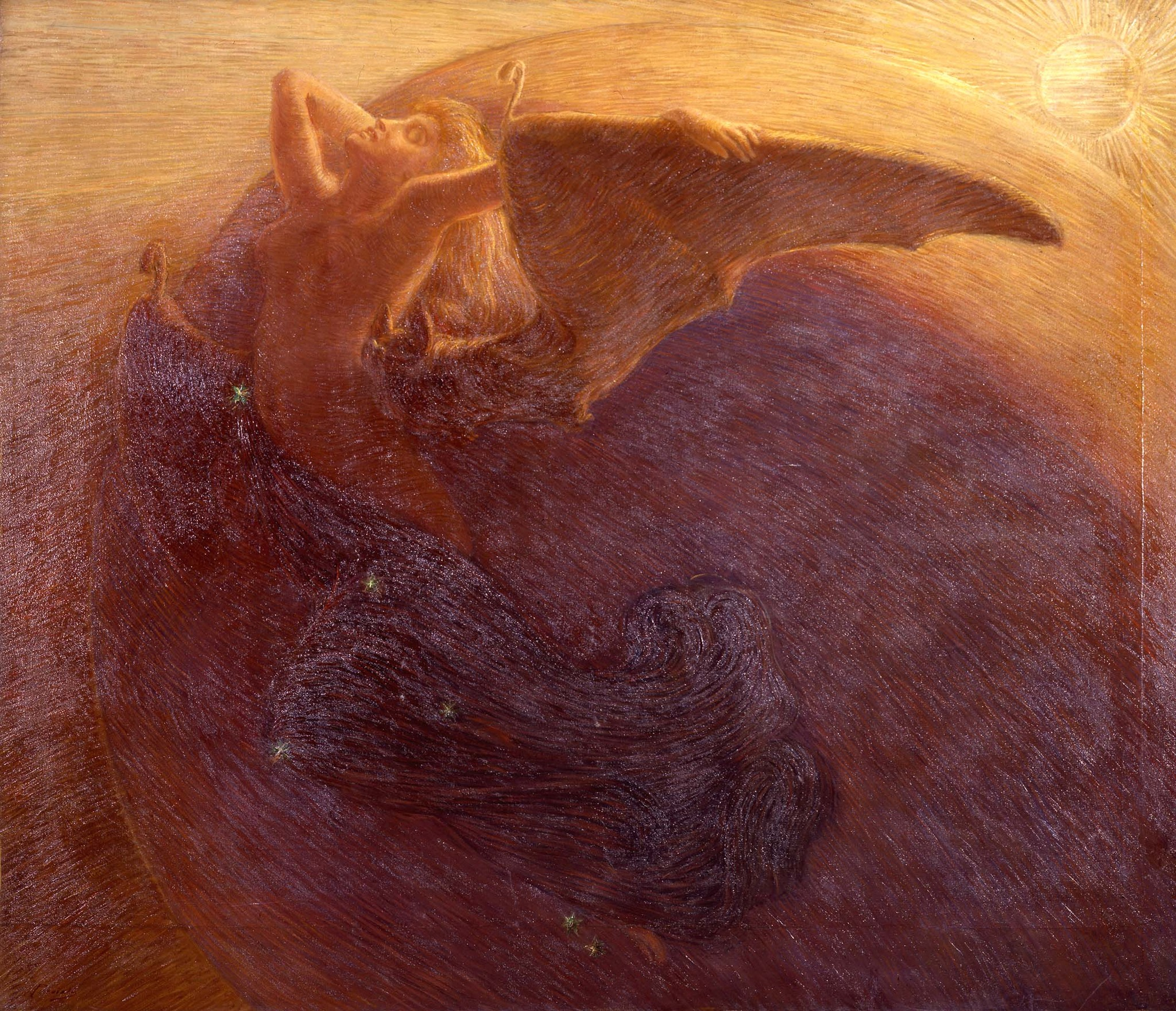
Day Awakens Night (c. 1905)

He now turned to the problem of the relationship between painting and the other arts, most notably music and literature. In works such as Day Awakens Night (1905; Trieste, Revoltella Museum) and the triptych Fall of the Rebel Angels (1913; Rome, Galleria Nazionale d'Arte Moderna) an overall ‘musicality’ was conjured up entirely by tonal variations in a near monochromatic range. The use of large surfaces worked with thread-like brushstrokes achieves an effect reminiscent of some of the work of Walter Crane and George Frederic Watts. The same quality can also be detected in the series of decorative panels prepared in 1908 for the music room of Grubicy's house (and since 1939 in Gabriele D'Annunzio’s villa at Gardone): The Dance (Pastoral), The Wind (Fantasia), Nocturne (Silence) and Harmony (Symphony).

Previati’s contract with Alberto Grubicy expired in 1908, but it was renewed in 1911 with the founding of the Società per l’Arte di Gaetano Previati. With the coming of war in 1914, however, the enterprise faced greater difficulties and these were increased as Previati’s health deteriorated. By 1917 he had stopped painting altogether. In a series of late canvases on the theme of the triumph of modern technology, however, Previati had demonstrated his adaptability. In Suez Canal, Pacific Railroad and especially in Piercing the Alps (all 1916; Milan, Camera di Commercio) a sense of the vast scale of oceans and mountains is deftly balanced with awe at human daring and achievement. Grief-stricken over the death of several members of his family, he died in 1920 at the town of Lavagna in Liguria, where he was in the habit of staying for long periods.

=== Theoretical writings ===
Interest in artistic technique was central to Previati’s theoretical writings on art. He believed that only a solid grounding in theory could allow an artist to work satisfactorily on a large scale. His first theoretical text (1895) was a brief dissertation on the technique of painting, sent to the Ministry of Public Education in response to the announcement of an international competition. He returned to the same problems in the early 1900s, perhaps at the request of Alberto Grubicy, who wanted theoretical support for his campaign to promote Divisionism on a European scale. Previati wrote a long treatise, eventually published by Bocca of Turin in two separate volumes: La tecnica della pittura (1905) and I principi scientifici del divisionismo (1906). These were followed, in 1913, by Della pittura, tecnica ed arte, also published by Bocca.

== Gallery ==
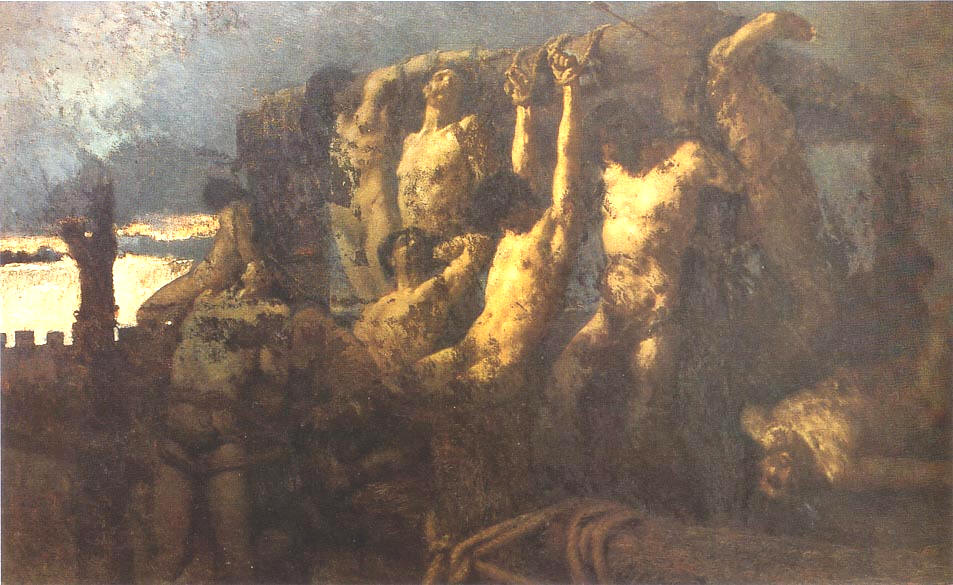
Ostaggi di Crema

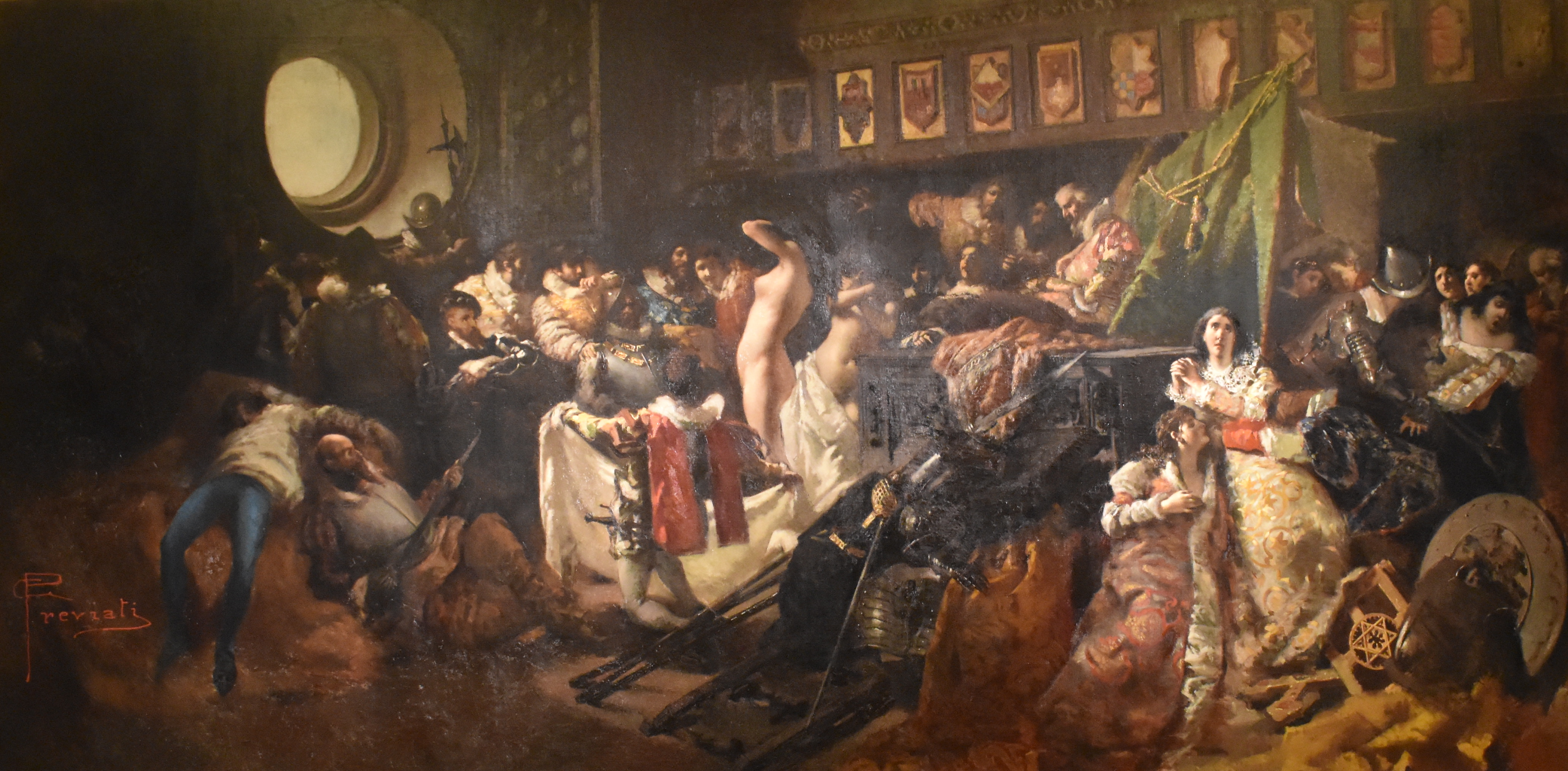
Cesare Borgia a Capua

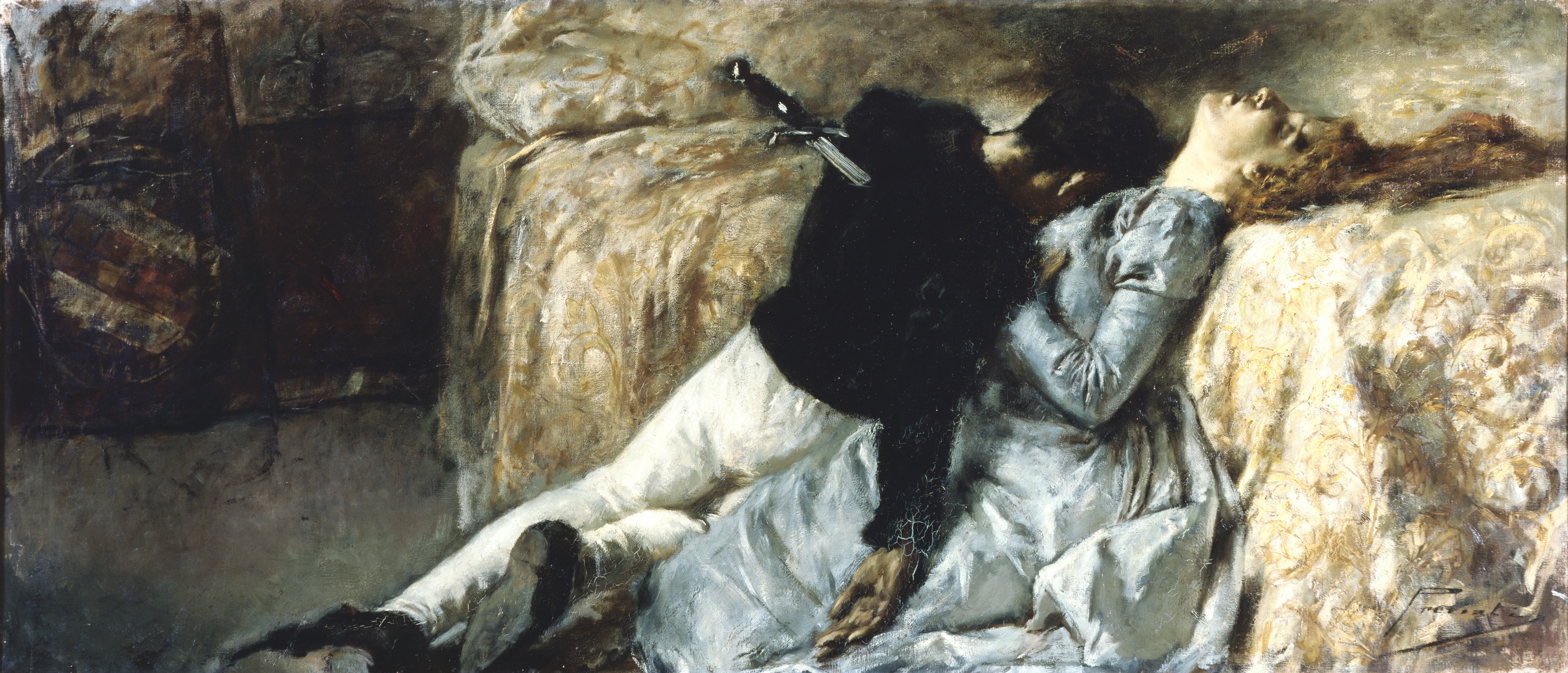
Paolo e Francesca

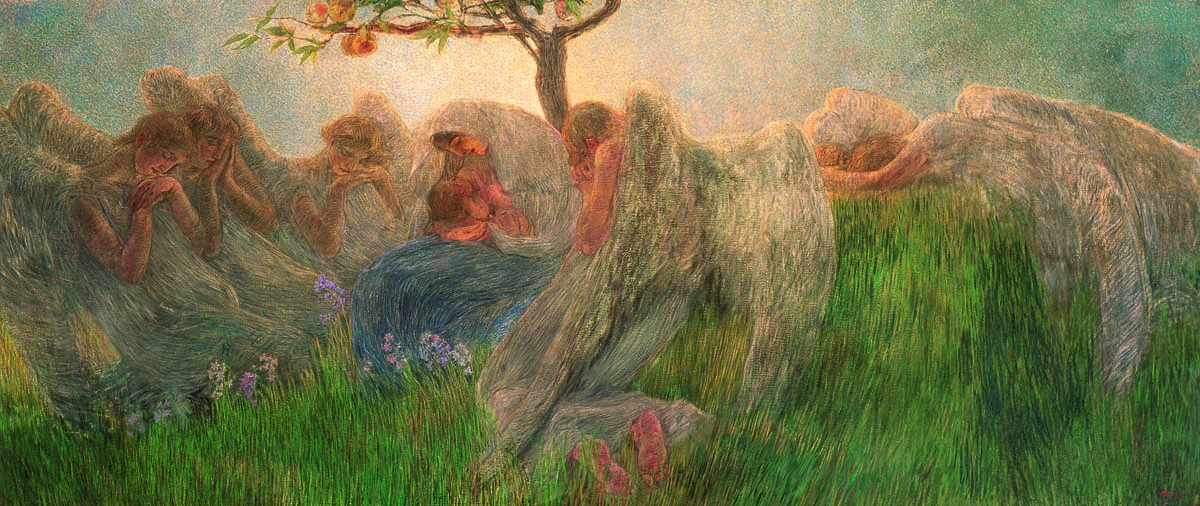
Maternity

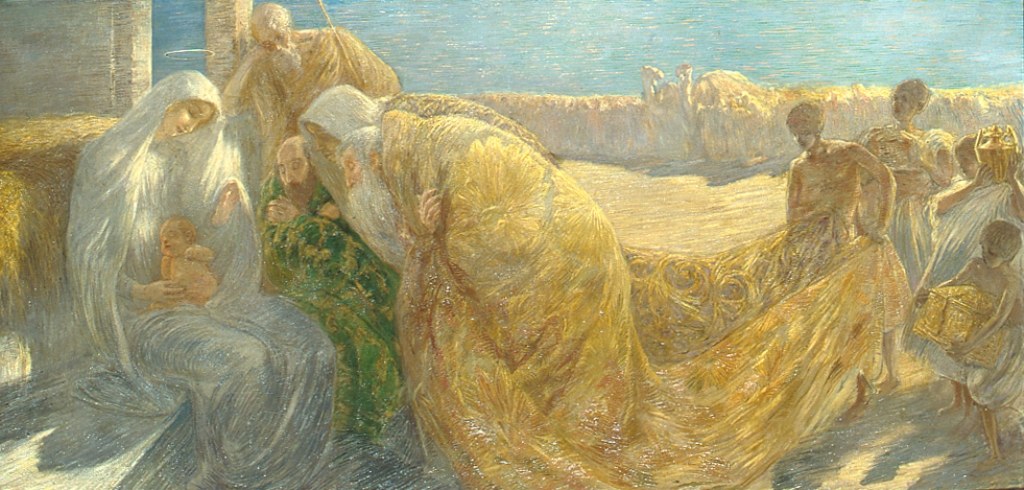
Adoration of the Magi

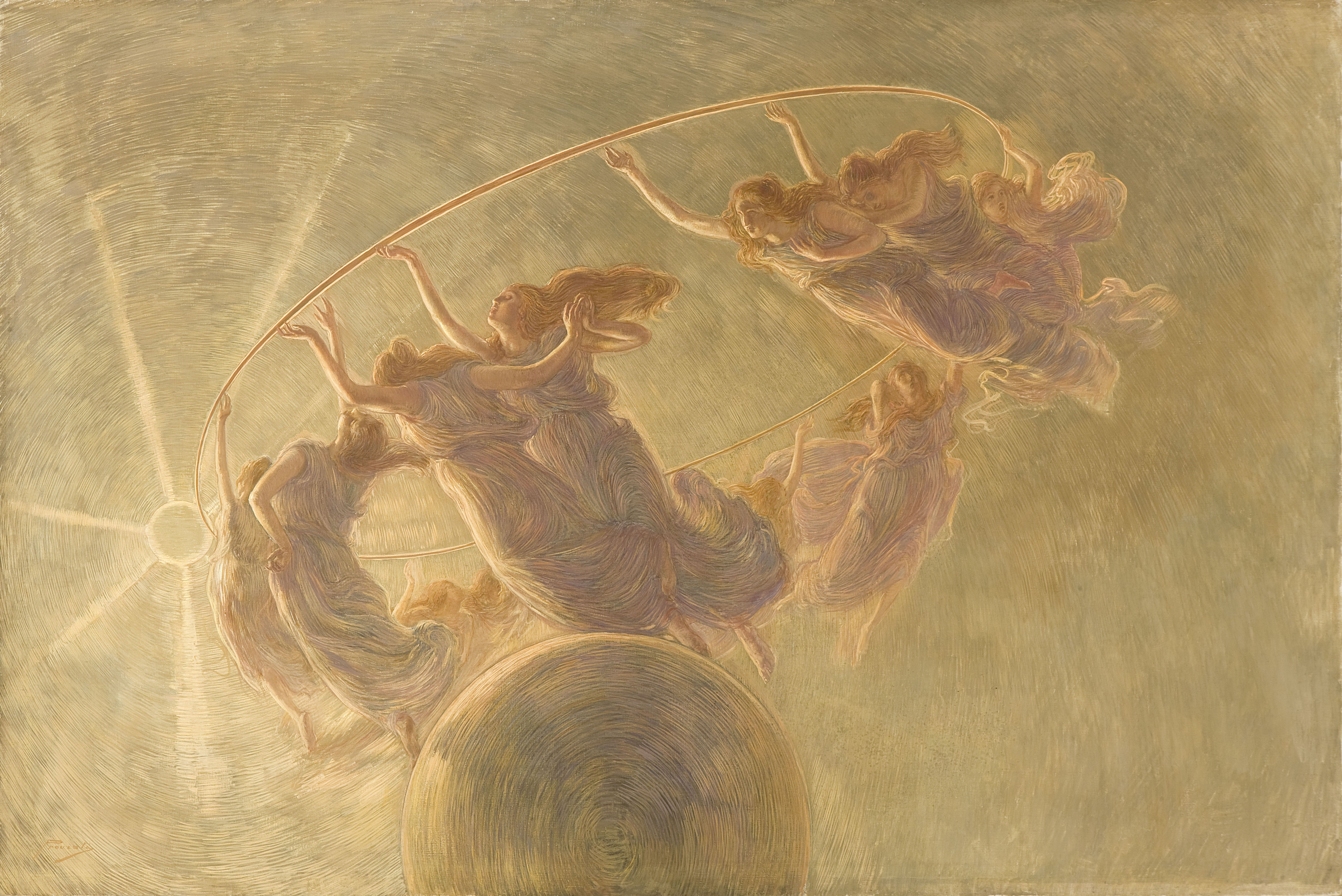
Dance of the Hours

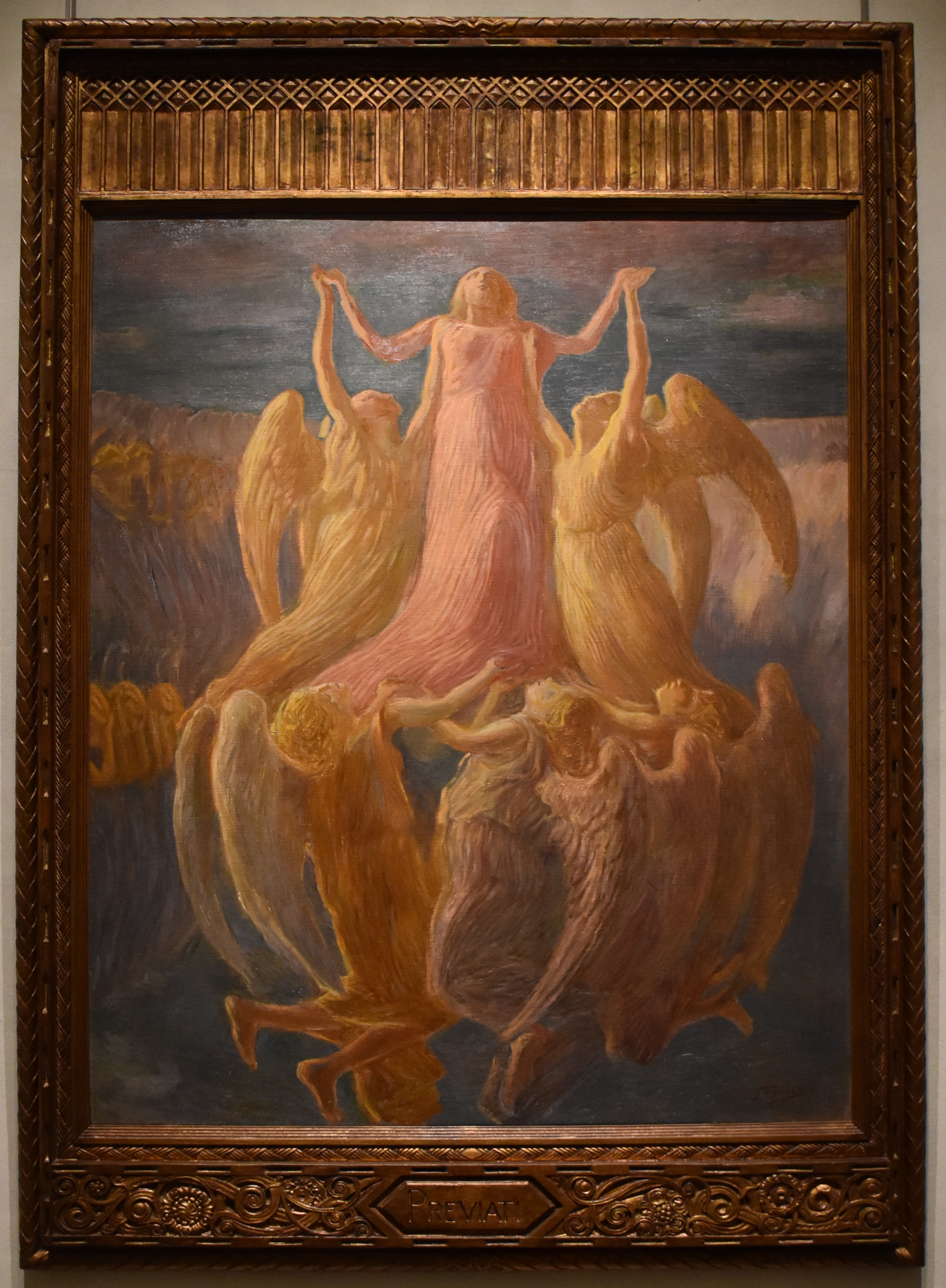
The Assumption

== Bibliography ==
- Laura Casone, Gaetano Previati, online catalogue Artgate by Fondazione Cariplo, 2010, CC BY-SA (source for the first revision of this article).
- Botta, Alessandro (2017). "Il fantasma sorge immediato e potente' i disegni di Gaetano Previati per i 'racconti' di Edgar Allan Poe: genesi e fonti". Saggi e Memorie di Storia dell'arte. 41: 194–221. JSTOR 45185087.
- Galli, Paolo Filippo (2020). "Angeli, Un Previati Ritrovato". Arte Lombarda. 188 (1): 122–28. JSTOR 27137245.
