= Arturo Tosi =

Italian painter (1871–1956)

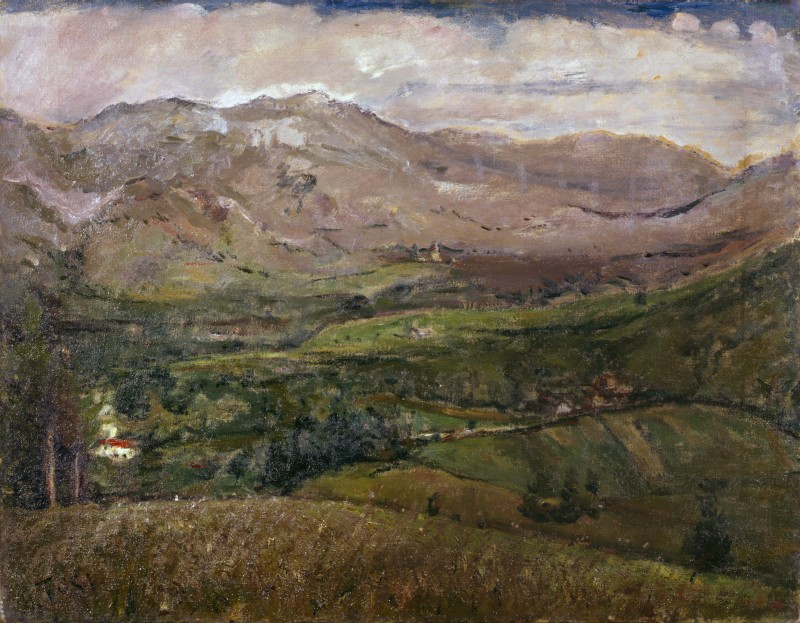
Alta Valle Seriana (Fondazione Cariplo)

Arturo Tosi (25 July 1871 – 3 January 1956) was an Italian painter known best for his landscapes.

== Biography ==
Tosi was born in Busto Arsizio, Italy. He moved to Milan in 1882 and attended the school of nude studies at the Brera Academy of Fine Arts from 1890 to 1891. He made his debut at the 1st Esposizione Triennale di Belle Arti in 1891 and attracted the attention of Vittore Grubicy, who steered him towards the late 19th-century Lombard tradition. Specialising in landscapes of the valleys around Bergamo, he presented work at the national exhibition held in Milan to mark the inauguration of the Sempione Tunnel in 1906. His participation in the Venice Biennale began in 1909 with the 8th Esposizione Internazionale d’Arte della Città di Venezia and continued uninterruptedly until 1956. Tosi came into contact with the critic Margherita Sarfatti in the 1920s and held his first solo show in 1923 at the Galleria Pesaro in Milan. He served on the Novecento Italiano governing committee and took part in the movement's first and second exhibitions (Milan, 1926 and 1929) as well as those held outside Italy. One of the most respected Italian painters from the 1930s on, he became a member of the Academy of San Luca in 1943. He died in Milan in 1956.

== Legacy ==
Busto Arsizio dedicated their 'Liceo Scientifico' to Arturo Tosi

== Other projects ==
Media related to Arturo Tosi at Wikimedia Commons
