= Palazzo Bellavite =

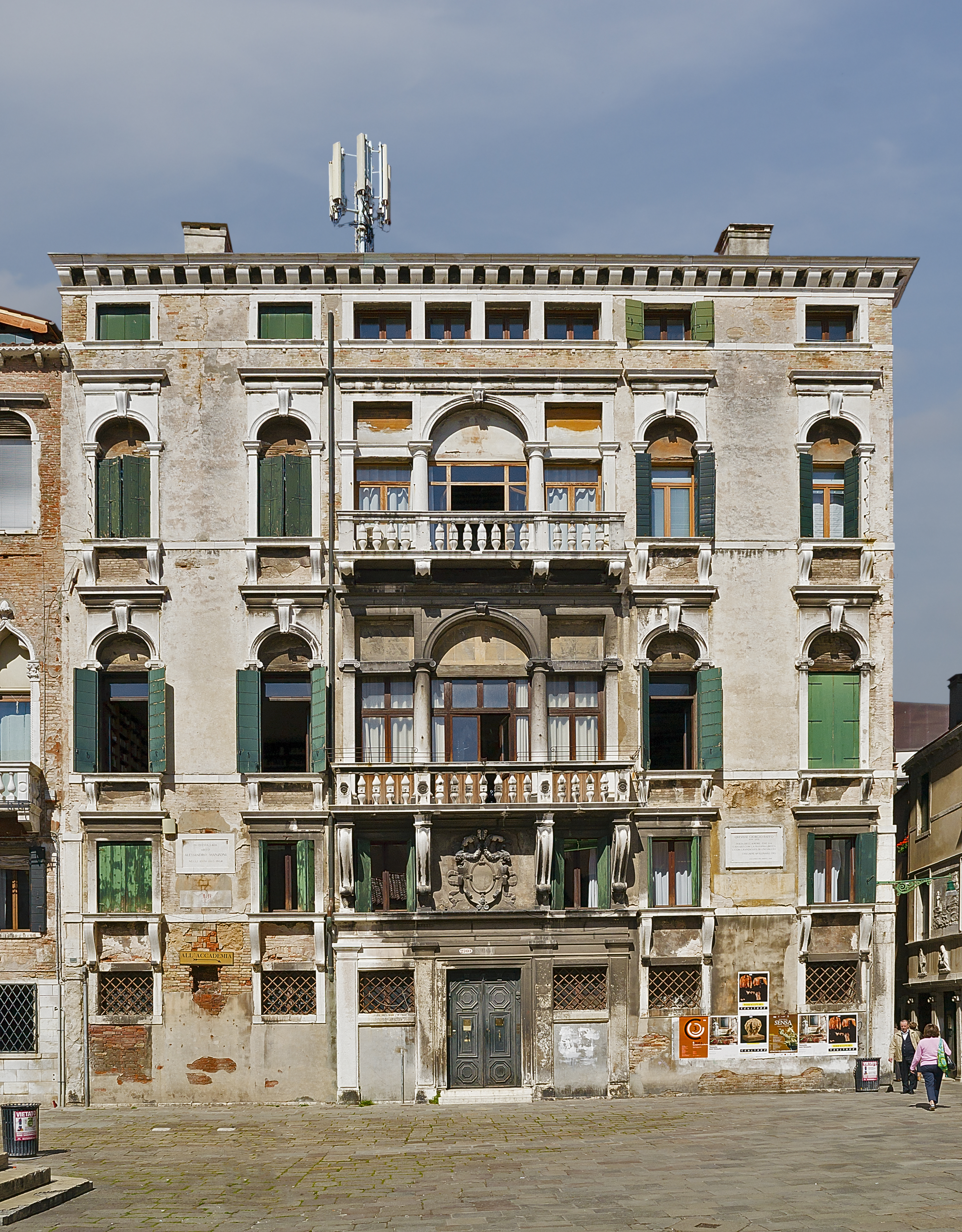
- Palazzo Bellavite on Campo San Maurizio
- Interactive map of the Palazzo Bellavite area

General information
- Type: Residential
- Architectural style: Baroque
- Location: San Marco district, Venice, Italy
- Coordinates: 45°25′58.68″N 12°19′52.77″E
- Construction stopped: 16th century

Technical details
- Floor count: 4

Design and construction
- Architect: Paolo Veronese

Palazzo Bellavite is a 16th-century Venetian palace, located in Campo San Maurizio, in the San Marco district. It is also known as Palazzo Bellavite Baffo, because the last member of the Baffo family lived there.

== History ==
Tha palace was commissioned by Dionisio Bellavite, a wealthy flour and oil merchant, in the early 16th century in place of the old bell tower of the church of San Maurizio. The façade was originally painted by Paolo Veronese with no traces remaining today. Poet Giorgio Baffo lived in the palace until his death in 1768; therefore, the structure is also known as Casa Baffo. Italian poet and novelist Alessandro Manzoni lived in the palazzo in 1803–1804. There are two stone plaques commemorating both poets on the palazzo façade.

== Architecture ==
The building has four levels with two in the middle designed as noble floors. The latter ones are decorated by serlianas flanked by pairs of single-light windows. The interiors are of 18th century with frescoes attributed to Pietro Antonio Novelli. Once a prestigious residential palazzo, the building is nowadays home to a study center and offices.

== Gallery ==
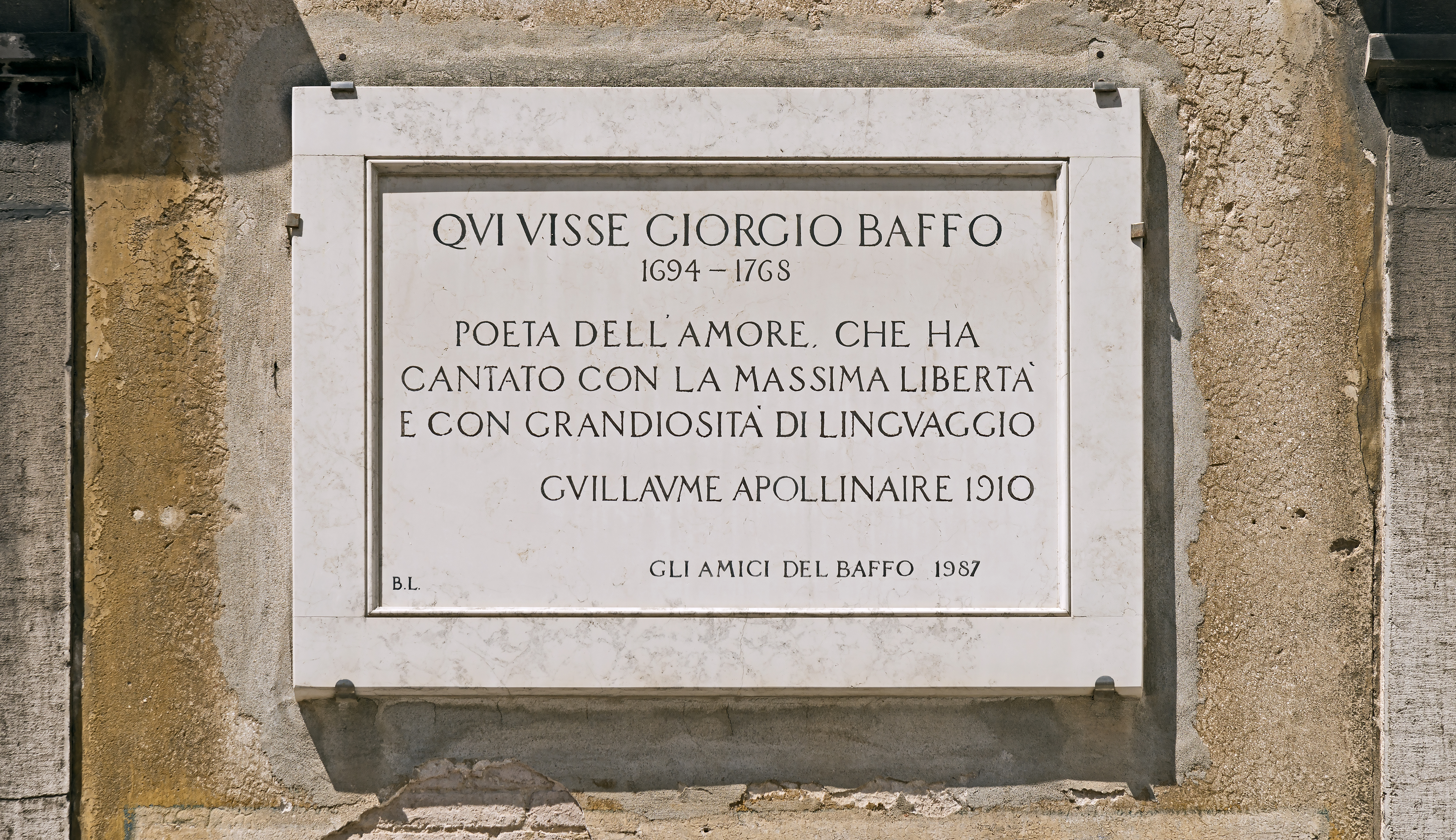
Plaque commemorating Giorgio Baffo on the facade, epitaph by Guillaume Apollinaire.

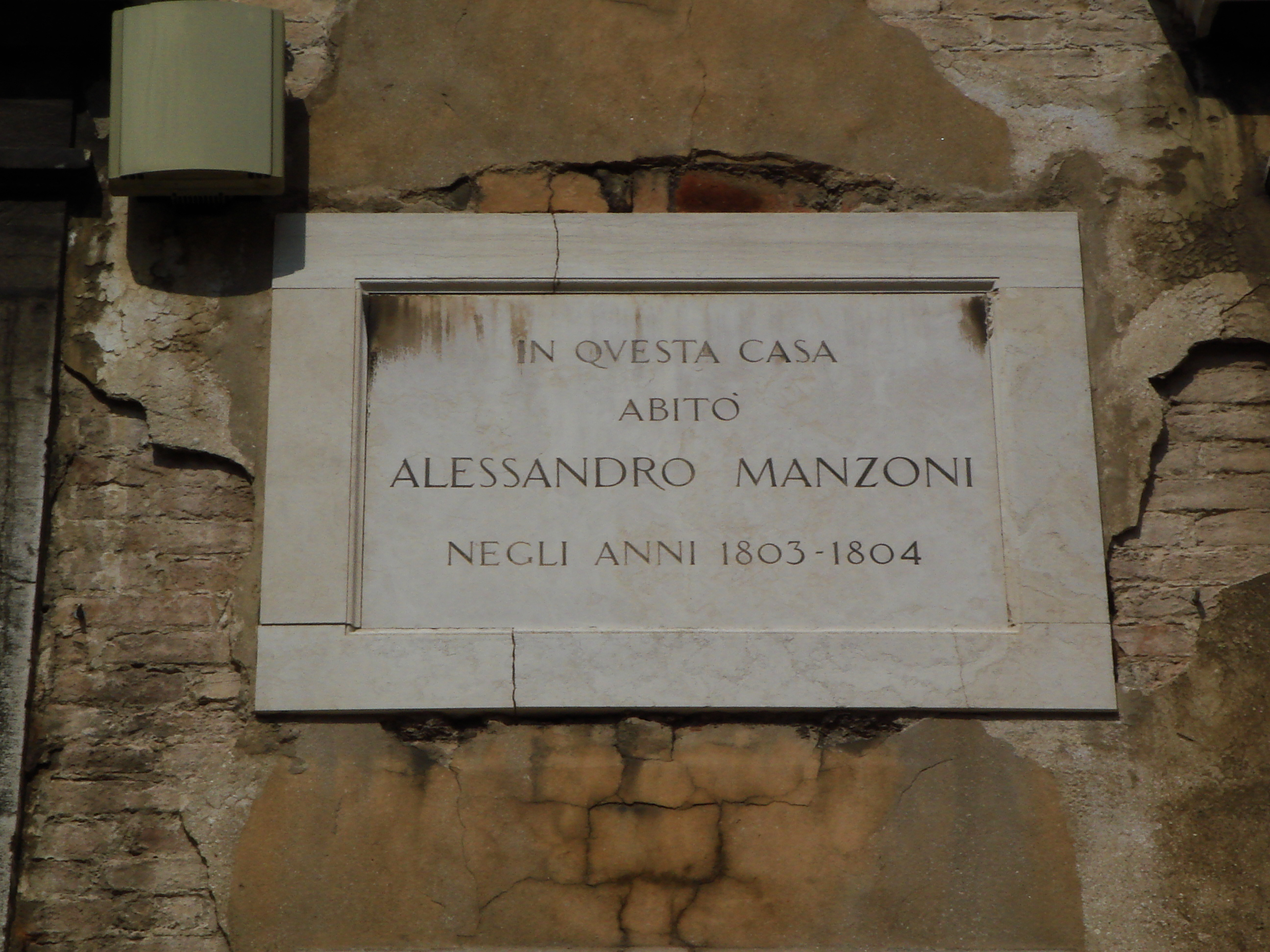
Commemorating plaque for Alessandro Manzoni, who lived here in 1803–1804.

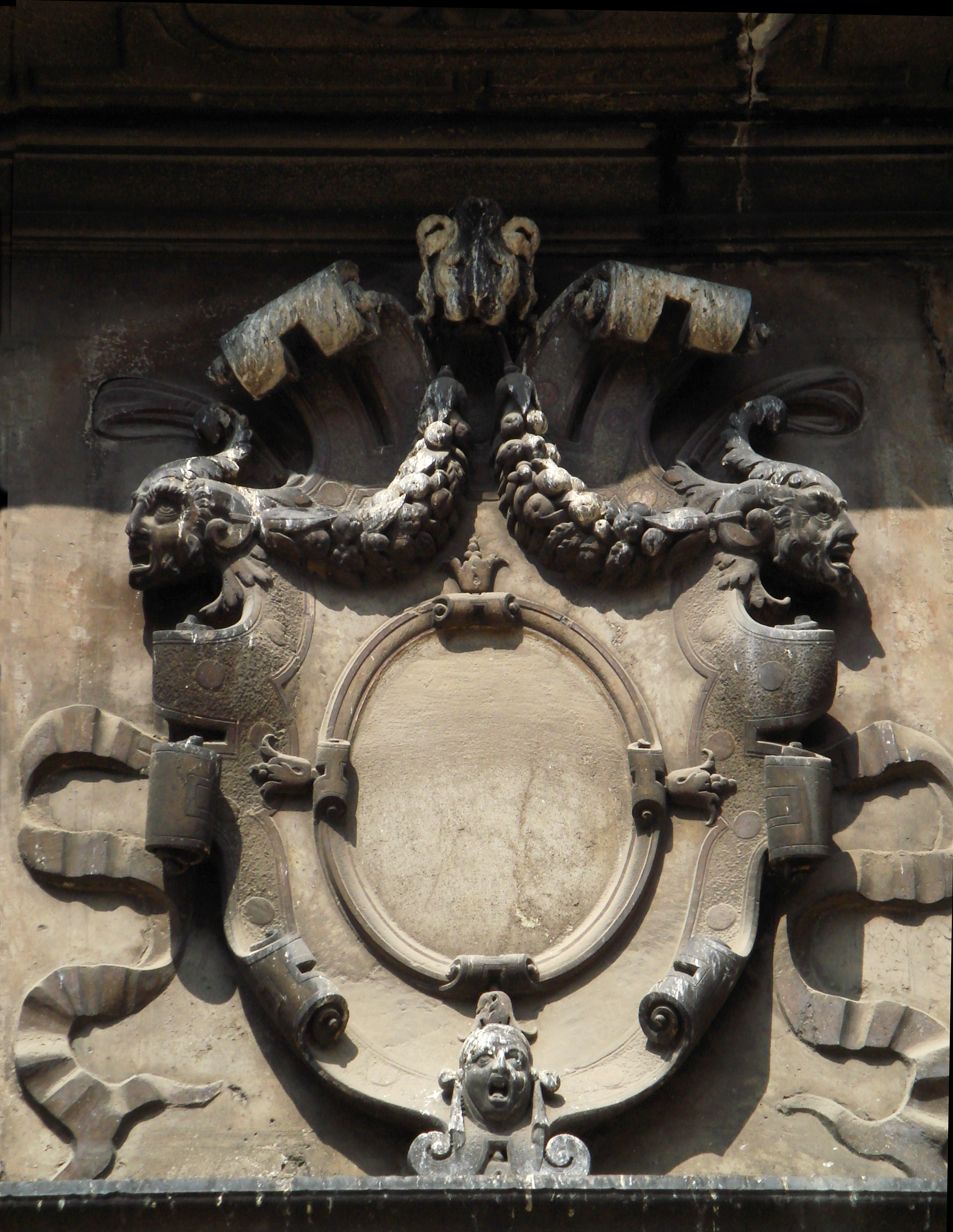
Relief on the facade

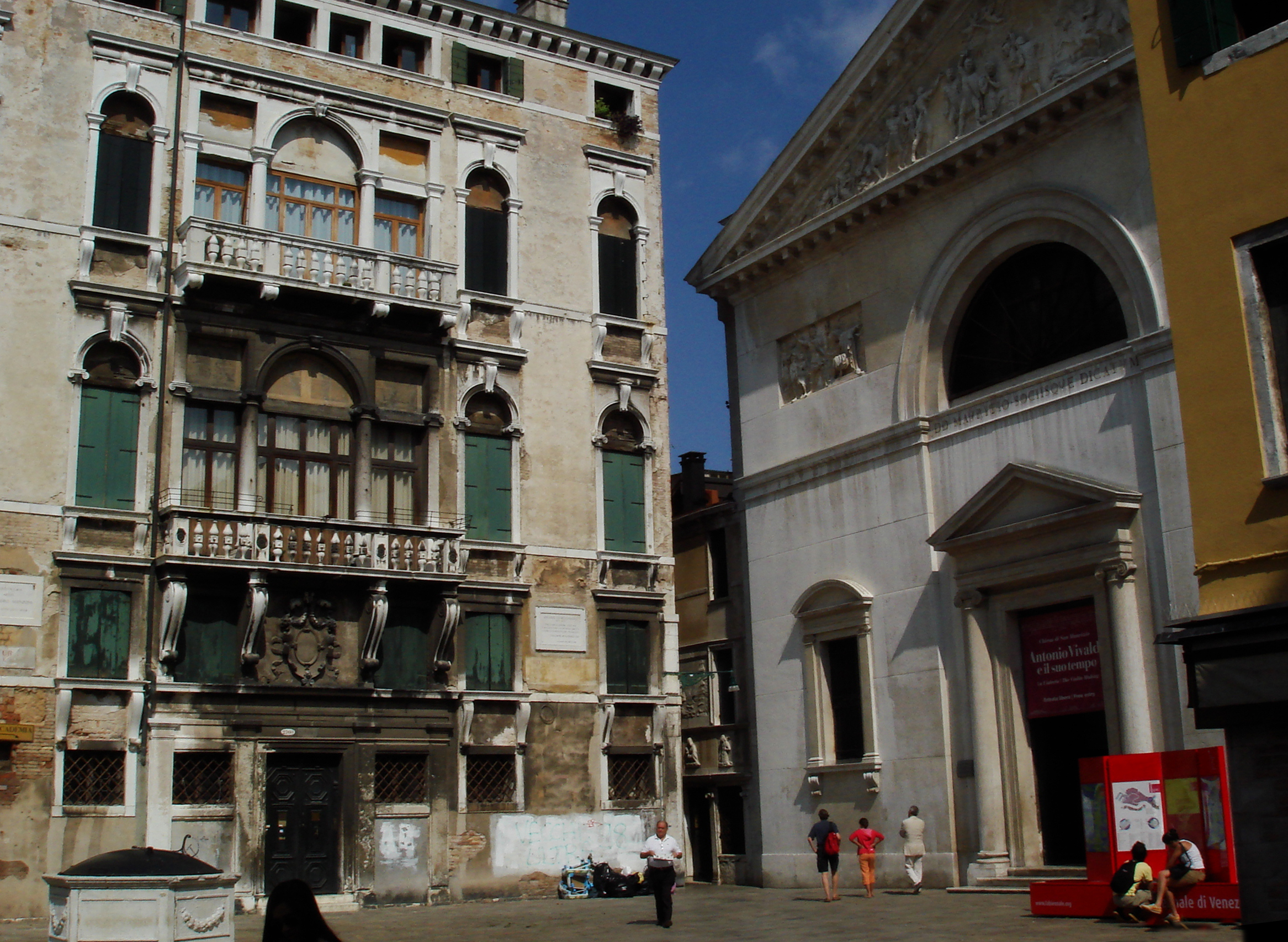
Facade details

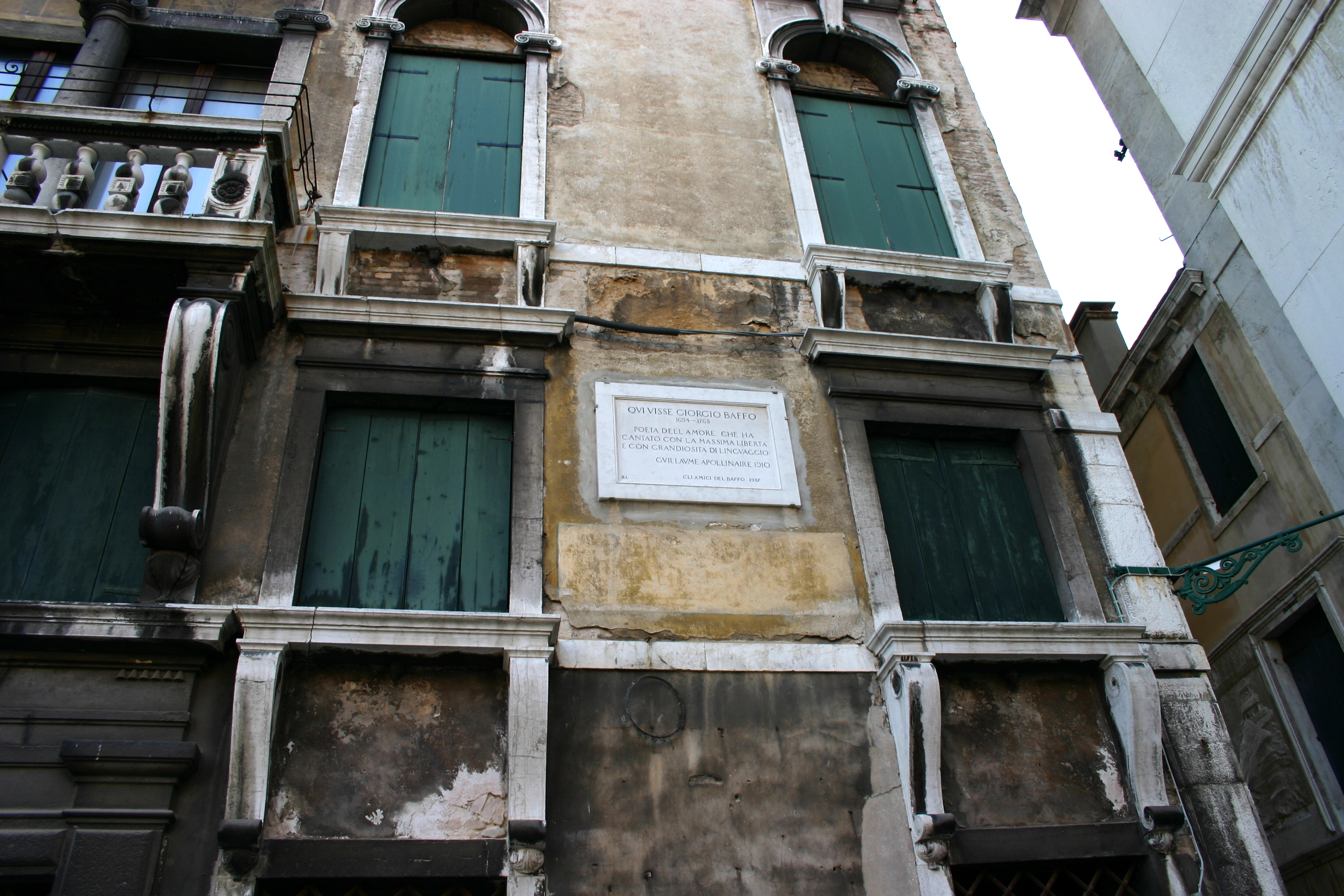
Facade details
