= Vittore Grubicy de Dragon =

Italian painter (1851–1920)

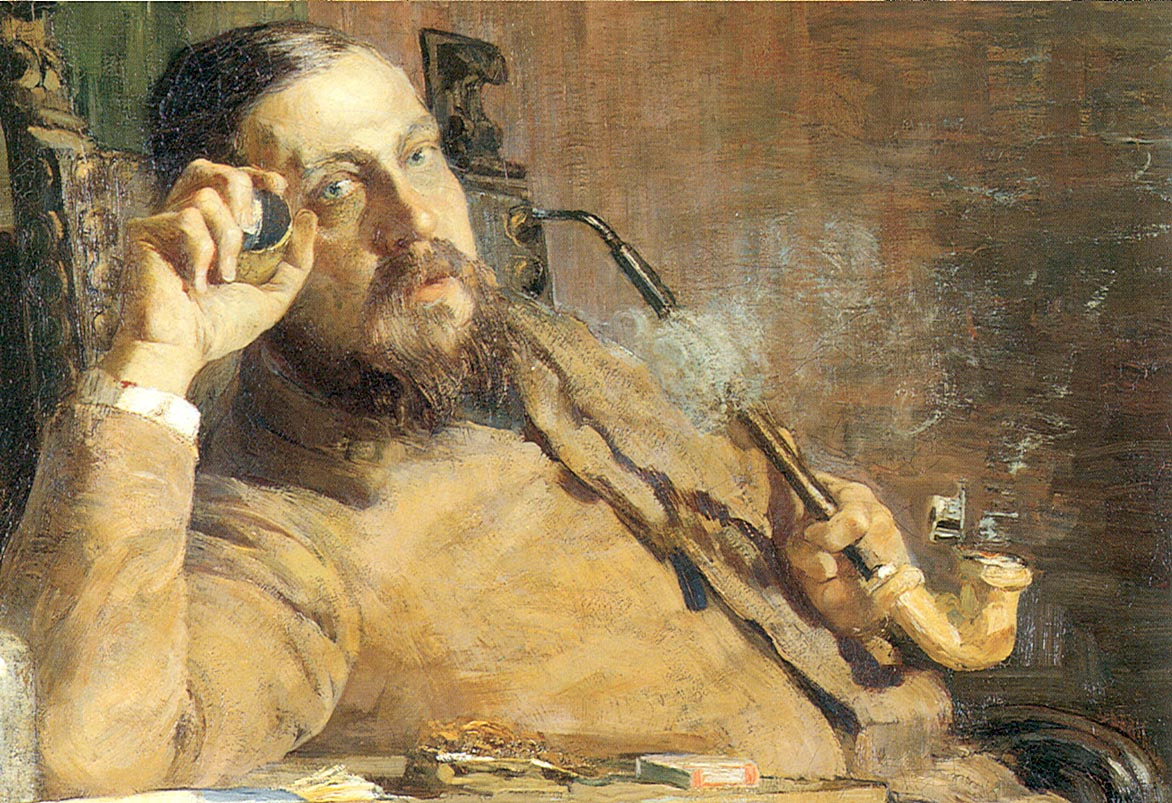
- Portrait of Grubicy by Giovanni Segantini
- Born: 15 October 1851; Milan, Austrian Empire
- Died: 4 August 1920 (aged 68); Milan, Italy
- Notable work: Winter in the Mountains
- Movement: Divisionism

Vittore Grubicy de Dragon (15 October 1851 – 4 August 1920) was an Italian painter, art critic and art gallery owner who was largely responsible for introducing into Italian painting the optical theories of Divisionism. His writings and paintings influenced a generation of late 19th-century Italian painters. In addition, the Grubicy Gallery became one of the first art enterprises to be run on the concept of exhibiting living artists that were represented as clients of the gallery.

== Biography ==
Grubicy was born on 15 October 1851, in Milan to a wealthy family. Both of his parents were great art lovers, and from an early age he was introduced to the art circles in Milan and other European cities.

After his father died in 1870, Grubicy became involved with a bohemian group of Milanese artists, poets and writers known as the Scapigliatura, who sought to blur the differences between art and life. He was so taken with this new lifestyle that he convinced his brother Alberto to join him in buying an art gallery, which came to be known as the Galleria Fratelli Grubicy. His brother ran the financial aspects of the gallery while Vittore traveled throughout Europe looking for the newest art trends. Their gallery initially specialized in Scapigliatura artists such as Tranquillo Cremona and Daniele Ranzoni, but within a few years it began to feature newer Italian artists that included Giovanni Segantini, Emilio Longoni and Angelo Morbelli.

Sea of Mist (Mare di nebbia), 1885. Private collection

Between 1882 and 1885, Grubicy spent most of his time in the Netherlands, where he became friends with artists of the Hague School, especially Anton Mauve. Mauve strongly influenced Grubicy as an artist and in his critical approach to art. When he returned to Italy, Grubicy encouraged the artists he represented to emulate the styles of Mauve and Mauve's cousin-in-law, Vincent van Gogh. Painter Emilio Longoni wrote, "Vittore Grubicy has brought Divisionism from abroad. He's having Segantini, Morbelli and me do it ourselves." Grubicy's passion for Divisionism was so strong that he convinced Segantini to rework an already finished painting, Ave Maria by the Lake, in a Divisionist technique.

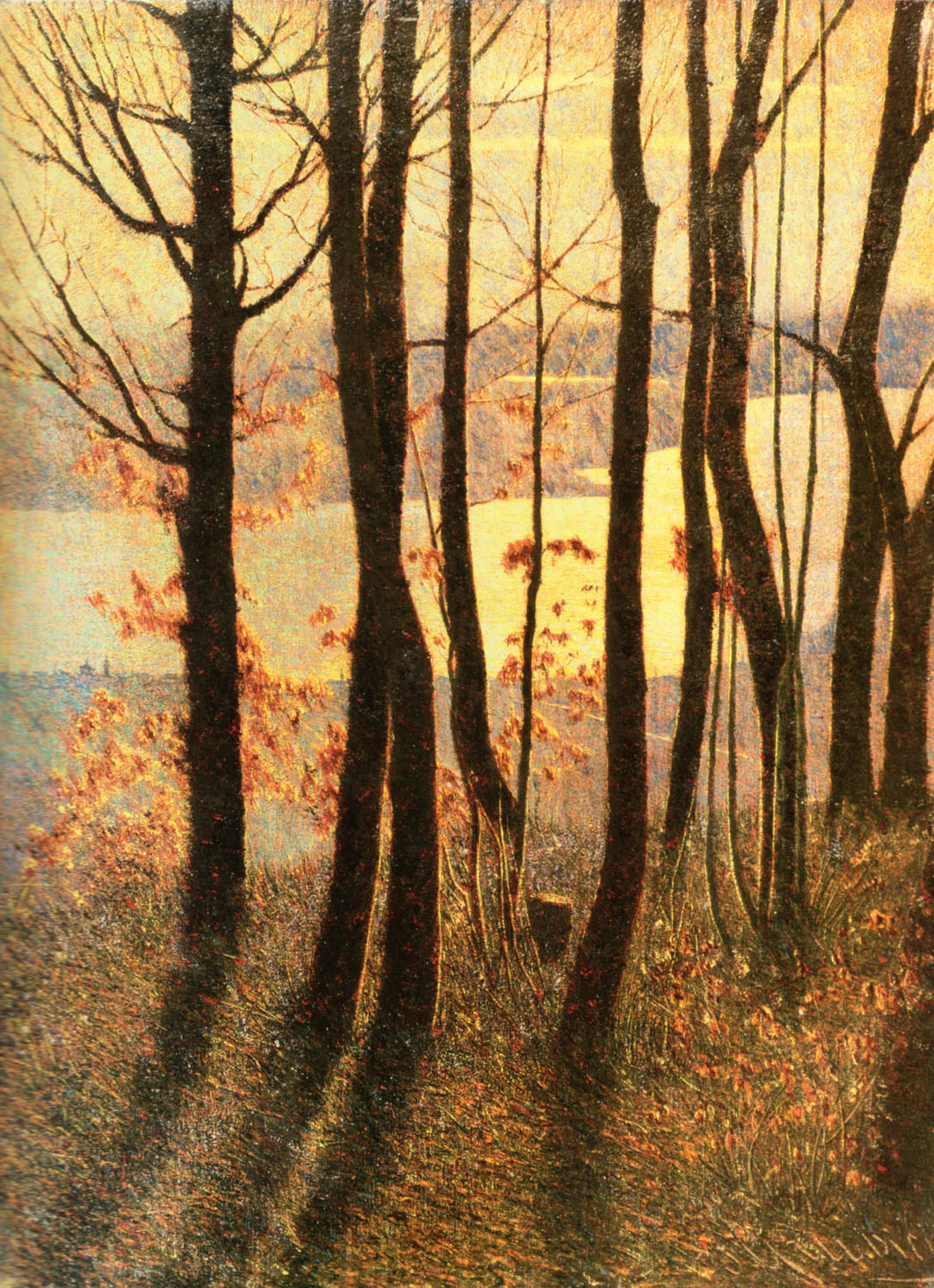
Morning (Mattino), 1898. Galleria d'Arte Moderna, Milan

In 1886, Grubicy became the art critic for the newspaper La Riforma, where for the next four years he used his position to further promote his artistic opinions. In that publication and in Cronaca d'Arte, the most important Italian art review of the time, Grubicy wrote extensively about "the perception of light as the tool best able to translate onto canvas subjective emotions…"

Photograph of the polyptych Winter in the Mountains, 1911

In 1889, Vittore left the gallery business over conflicts with his brother, and he began to devote most of his time to his own painting and to writing about other artists. He continued to act as an independent talent scout, and in 1891 he helped organize the first large exhibition of Italian Divisionist painting at Milan's Brera Triennale. Conservative art critics wrote scathing reviews of many of the works, but Grubicy wrote very positive reviews in several newspapers. One of the most important paintings shown at that exhibition was Gaetano Previati's Maternity. In writing about this work Grubicy introduced the concept of Symbolism in Italian painting when he hailed the piece as embodying a new aesthetic which he called "mystico-ideist".

Grubicy also influenced his fellow artists through his compositions of multiple paintings arranged as triptychs and polyptychs. In the early 1890s, he began planning a polyptych of sixteen panels under the title of Winter in Miazzina. The work took shape as an interchangeable sequence of paintings that reflected his emotional experiences over the long winters at Miazzina on the shore of Lake Maggiore. Each canvas was subjected to continued revisions by Grubicy over many years, depending upon his mood and his interests. Finally, in 1911, the polyptych assumed its final form in an arrangement of only eight paintings that he called Winter in the Mountains. In spite of all his work to create it, he did not exhibit it during his lifetime. It was first shown together at the Rome Biennale in 1921, the year after his death. After that the assemblage did not remain as a polyptych, and the individual paintings were sold to different collectors and museums. Grubicy took a photograph of the polyptych as he intended it to be seen, and based upon that image the work has been reassembled for several exhibitions since his death, most recently at the Kunsthaus Zürich in 2009.

His health deteriorated after 1910, and during the last decade of his life he had to give up painting altogether. He remained an active promoter of new artists during this period, especially Carlo Carrà, Pietro Angelini and Arturo Tosi.

Grubicy died at his home in Milan in 1920.
