= Giuseppe Mentessi =

Italian painter (1857–1931)

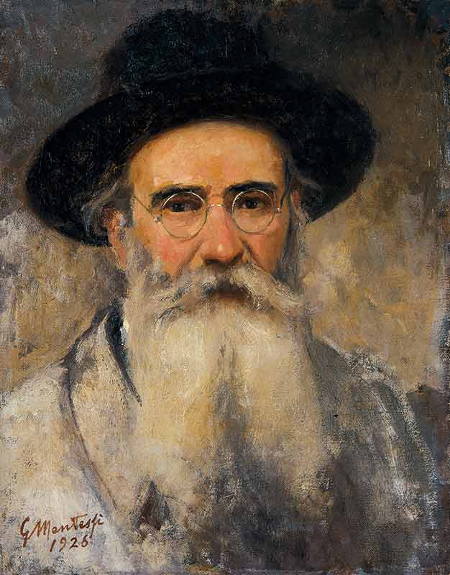
Self-portrait (1926)

Giuseppe Mentessi (29 September 1857, Ferrara - 14 June 1931, Milan) was an Italian landscape and veduta painter.

== Biography ==
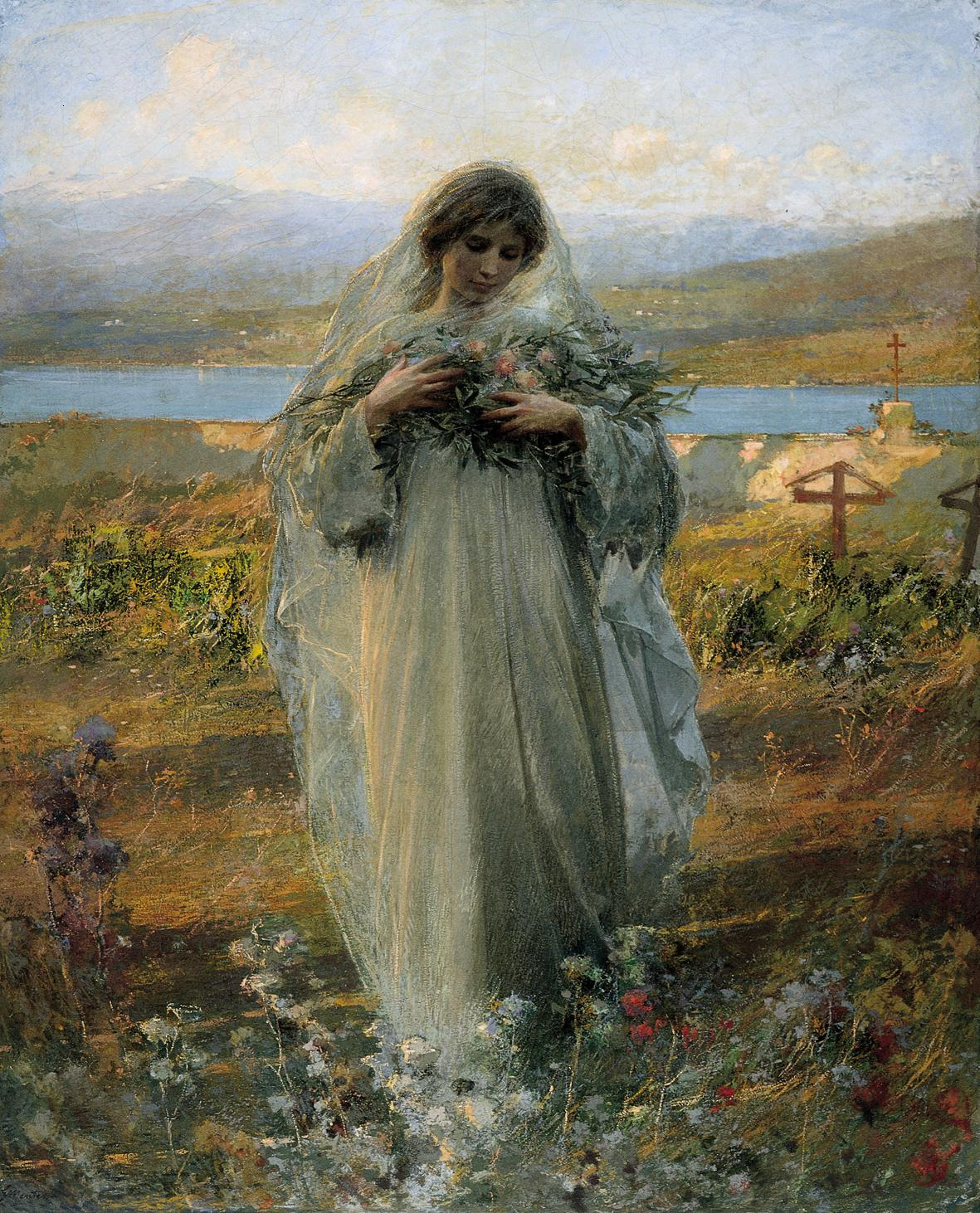
Peace

He was born to Michele Mentessi, a merchant, and his wife Teresa, née Bentini. His father died when he was only seven. Despite having to help support his family, he was able to take drawing lessons at the Civic Art School in Ferrara. He then attended the Academy of Fine Arts of Parma, with the help of a government subsidy, where his primary instructor was Giacomo Giacopelli.

In 1877, encouraged by his friends, he moved to Milan to complete his studies at the Brera Academy. There, he studied perspective with Luigi Bisi. He also attended a course on architecture and scenography, taught by Carlo Ferrario, who had worked with Giuseppe Verdi, and received commissions for projects at La Scala.

In 1880, he became a teaching assistant to Luca Beltrami, a professor of architectural drawing and elementary geometry. Two years later, he began to participate in their annual exhibitions. That same year, he was assigned his own class in geometry, which he would teach until 1912. He published his first text in 1887: A Collection of Decorative Motifs for the Teaching of Chiaroscuro in Schools. This resulted in an appointment to the chair of landscape painting. In 1907, he succeeded Ferrario as a perspective teacher, a position he would occupy until 1923. He sought to make all of his classes available to working-class people and war veterans.

His early paintings were influenced by the Scapigliatura movement. Later, he added elements from Art Nouveau. In 1895 he was invited to the first Venice Biennale, and presented Panem Nostrum Quotidianum, a socially conscious work dealing with the scourge of pellagra in the countryside. In 1899, he exhibited a work depicting the Bava Beccaris massacre. He took part in the Biennale until 1914.

During these years, he created illustrations for books by Neera, Gerolamo Rovetta and Berto Barbarani, among others. He also did some decorative work, at the Villa Facheris in Inzago, the Villa Paradiso in Montesiro, and the chapels at the cemeteries in Lenno and Verderio. His largest such work, however, was a series of saints for the Basilica di San Babila.

He officially retired in 1924, was named a Professor Emeritus, and spent the remainder of his life devoted to landscape painting. He was buried at the Monumental Cemetery of Certosa in Ferrara, alongside his mother, in a tomb designed by his former associate, Beltrami. His works may be seen at the Museo dell'Ottocento in Ferrara, the Galleria d'Arte Moderna in Venice, and the Galleria Nazionale d'Arte Moderna in Rome.

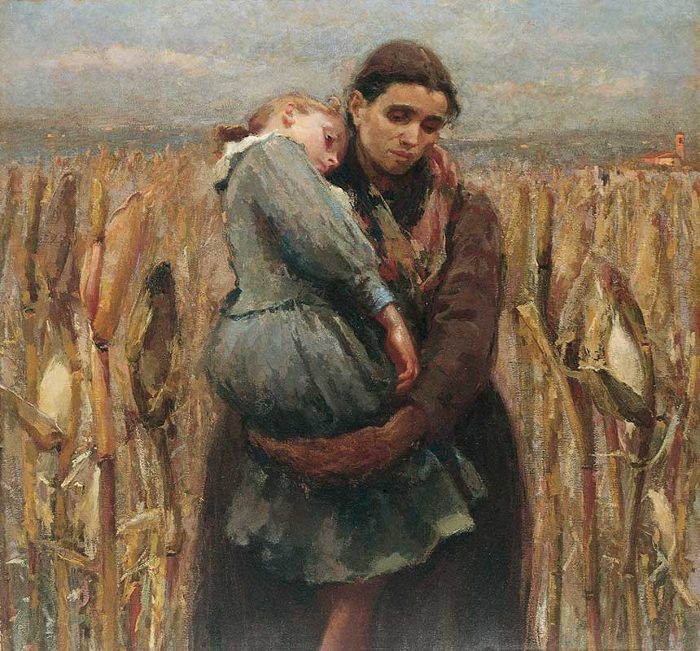
Panem Nostrum Quotidianum
