= Berto Barbarani =

Italian poet

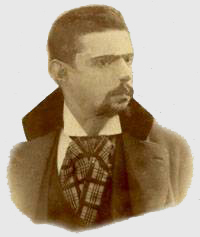
Berto Barbarani

Roberto Tiberio "Berto" Barbarani (born and died Verona, Italy; 3 December 1872 – 27 January 1945) was an Italian poet. He wrote many poems in the Veronese dialect of Northern Italy.

== Biography ==
He was born in the historic center of Verona, near the New Bridge on the Adige river, from non-wealthy parents who ran a hardware store. He started studying with his brother Vittorio, who earned his medical degree. Berto instead, following the death of his father (1887), had to leave the boarding school to help his mother manage the shop. This did not prevent him from continuing his studies until he enrolled in the faculty of law at the University of Padua. He abandoned it after the first exams, while continuing to collaborate on a student newspaper with his first poems (1892), which were then the basis of the first collection El rosario del cor (1895).

In that year he embarked on a journalistic career, collaborating with the newspaper L'Adige and later with the Gazzettino. He joined fellow dialect poets Alfredo Testoni (Bolognese) and Carlo Alberto Salustri (known as Trilussa, Roman) to make strong friendships. Together they took part in the Duse Theater of Bologna in a cycle of evenings promoted for charity in 1901 by the "Dante Alighieri" Society.
