= Federico Faruffini =

Italian painter and engraver (1833-1869)

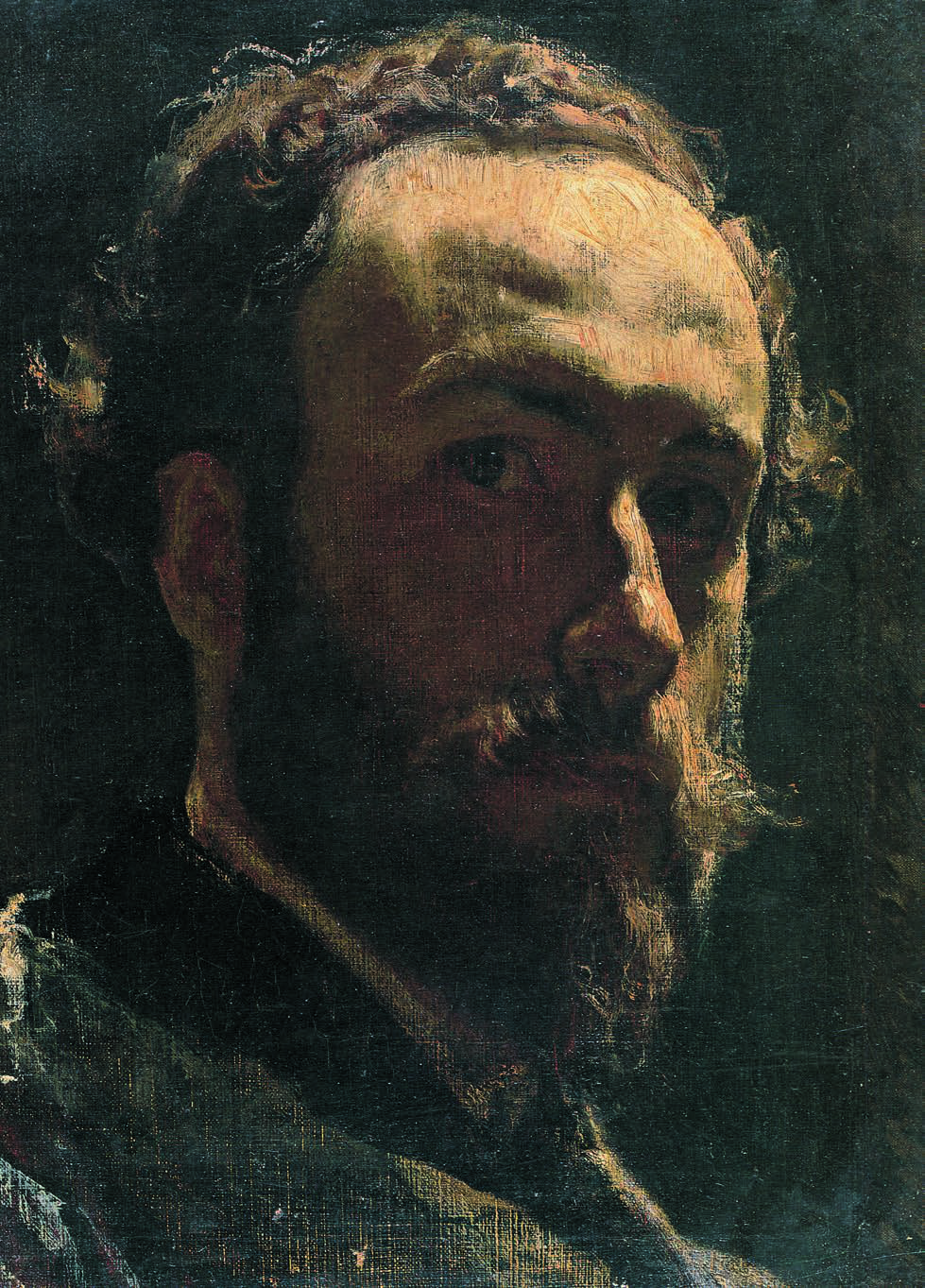
- Self portrait, 1867, Accademia di San Luca, Rome
- Born: 12 August 1833; Sesto, Kingdom of Lombardy–Venetia
- Died: 15 December 1869 (aged 36); Milan, Kingdom of Italy
- Known for: Painting
- Movement: Scapigliatura

Federico Faruffini (12 August 1833 – 15 December 1869) was an Italian painter and engraver of historical subjects. He worked in a style that combines the styles and themes of Realism with the diffuse outlines and lively colors of Scapigliatura painters.

== Biography ==
=== Early life and education ===
Federico Faruffini was born in Sesto, a commune now inside the metropolitan area of Milan. Obliged by his father to study law at the University of Pavia, he also enrolled at the local art school. When he abandoned his legal studies, he received essential financial support from his two brothers. With the painting Cola di Rienzo Contemplating the Ruins of Ancient Rome (1855; Pavia, Visconti Castle), Faruffini relinquished the academic Romanticism of Francesco Hayez and of Giacomo Trécourt, head of the art school in Pavia, adopting instead a style clearly influenced by the work of Giovanni Carnovali.

=== Early career ===
Faruffini apparently first visited Rome in 1856, remaining there until 1858. During this period he received his first official commission, the Immaculate Conception for Pavia Cathedral, and also painted Cardinal Ascanio Sforza Examining the Model of Pavia Cathedral (Pavia, Visconti Castle). In 1860 he went to Venice, probably to visit the painter Tranquillo Cremona, whom he had known in Pavia. The impact of the colour in Venetian painting was immediately apparent in Faruffini’s Titian’s Gondola (Milan, Pinacoteca di Brera), in which he attempted a new form of history painting. The intimate, almost romantic atmosphere of the scene is emphasized by soft forms, achieved through interesting juxtapositions of light, shade, and colour. The work was received favourably at the annual exhibition at the Brera Academy in 1861.

=== Mature work ===
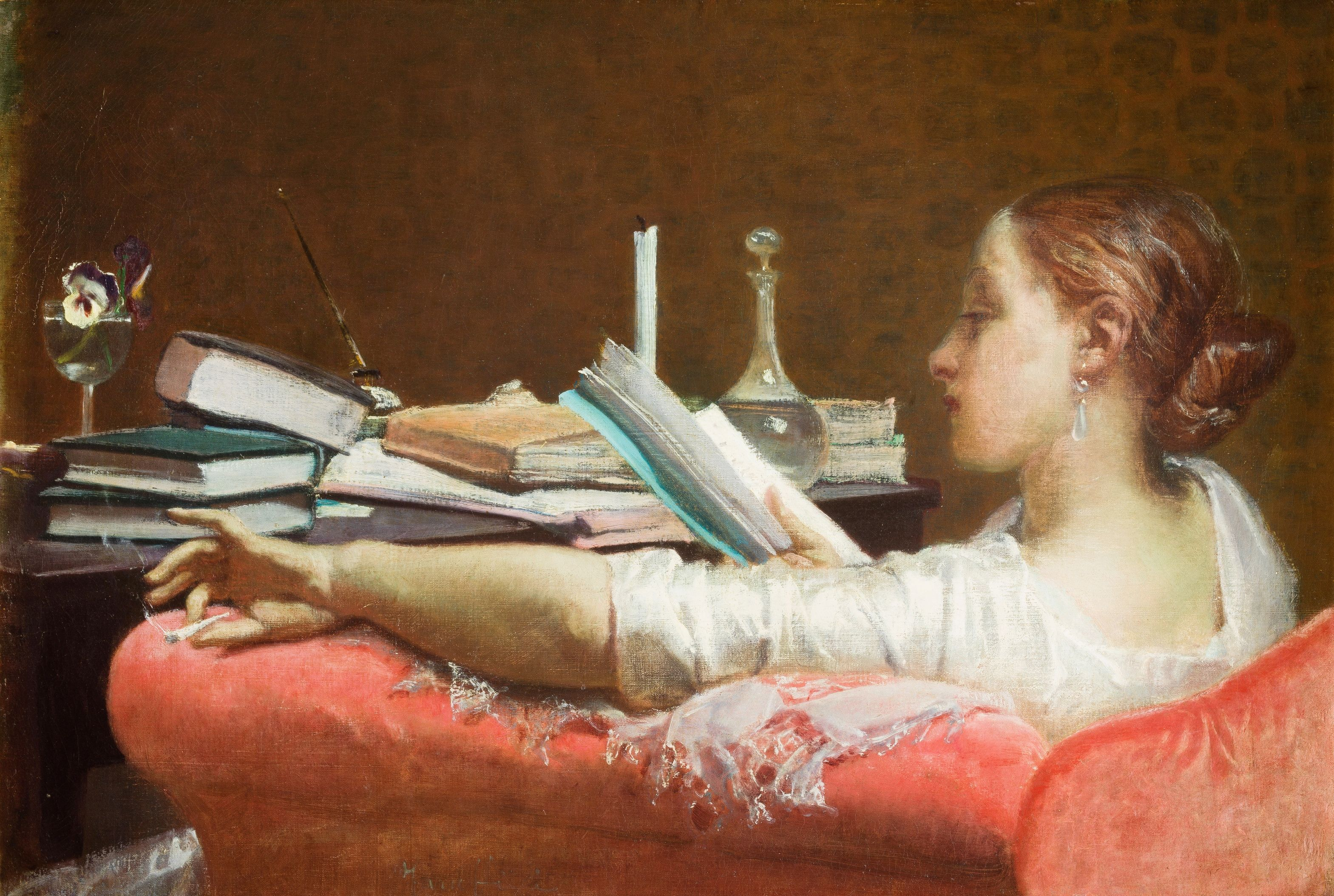
The Reader: Clara (1864; Galleria d'Arte Moderna, Milan)

In 1863 he was invited to send a group of watercolors to the Société des Aquarellistes in Brussels, and he was nominated for several official positions in Italy. His best-known work, The Reader: Clara (1864; Galleria d'Arte Moderna, Milan), was followed by the less successful Virgin Being Sacrificed to the River Nile (1865; Rome, Galleria Nazionale d'Arte Moderna), one of his few paintings of exotic subject-matter.

In 1865 Faruffini began experimenting with etching, usually following the compositions of his previous paintings. He also produced a series of illustrations for Francesco Pagnoni’s edition (1865) of Dante’s Divine Comedy. The following year Faruffini went to Paris, where his Legation of Niccolò Machiavelli, Citizen and Secretary of Florence, to Cesare Borgia, Duke Valentino (1864), received a gold medal at the Exposition Universelle of 1867. The Orgy of Messalina (1867; Milan, priv. col.) reflects the influence of the French painter Thomas Couture.

In 1867 Faruffini returned to Italy, and in 1868 he became interested in photography, using the collodion process and favouring a large-scale format, simplified settings, and well-defined spacing. Lack of recognition and financial difficulties are said to have led him to his suicide at age 38 in Perugia.

== Gallery ==
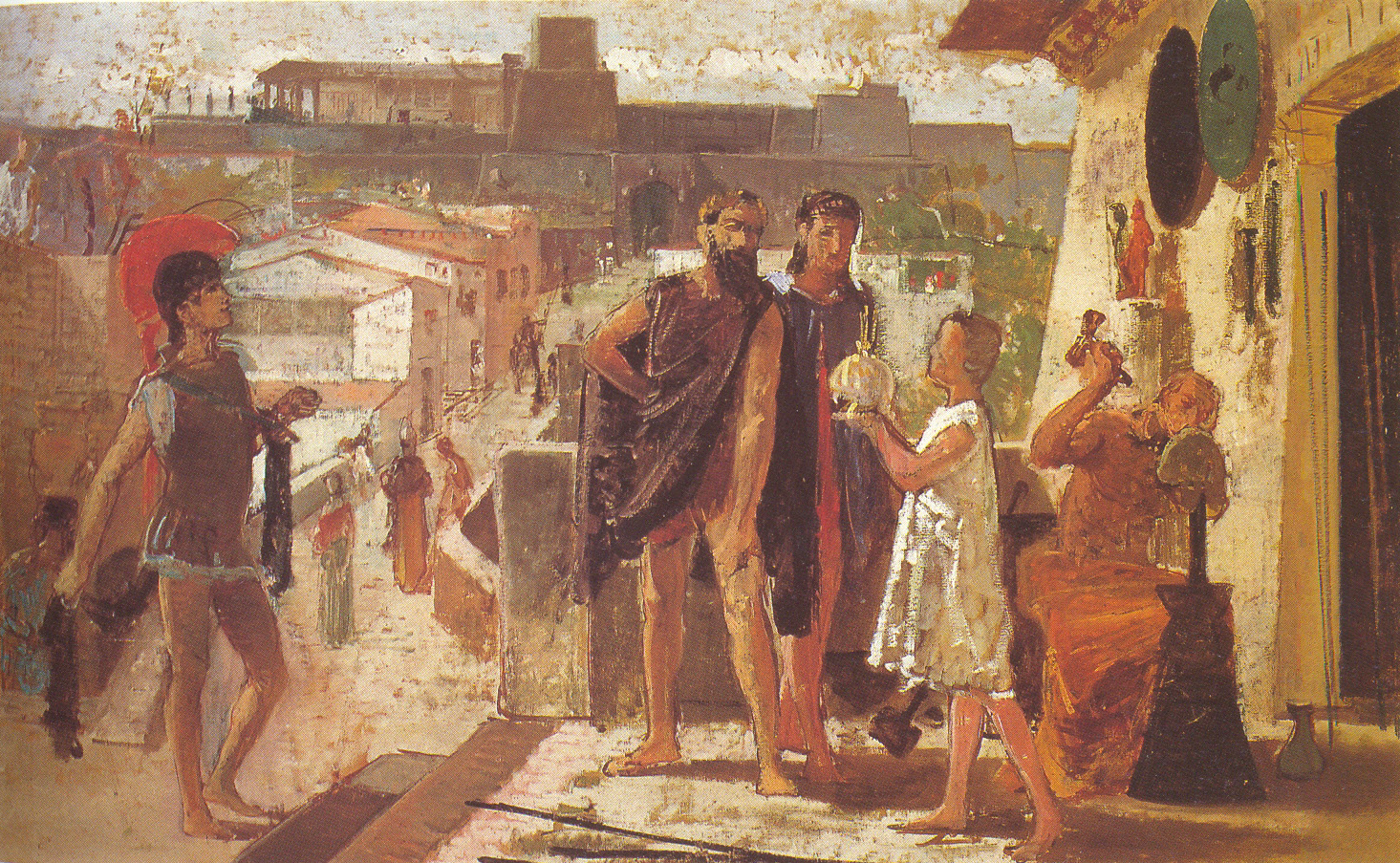
The Etruscans in Perugia, c. 1869

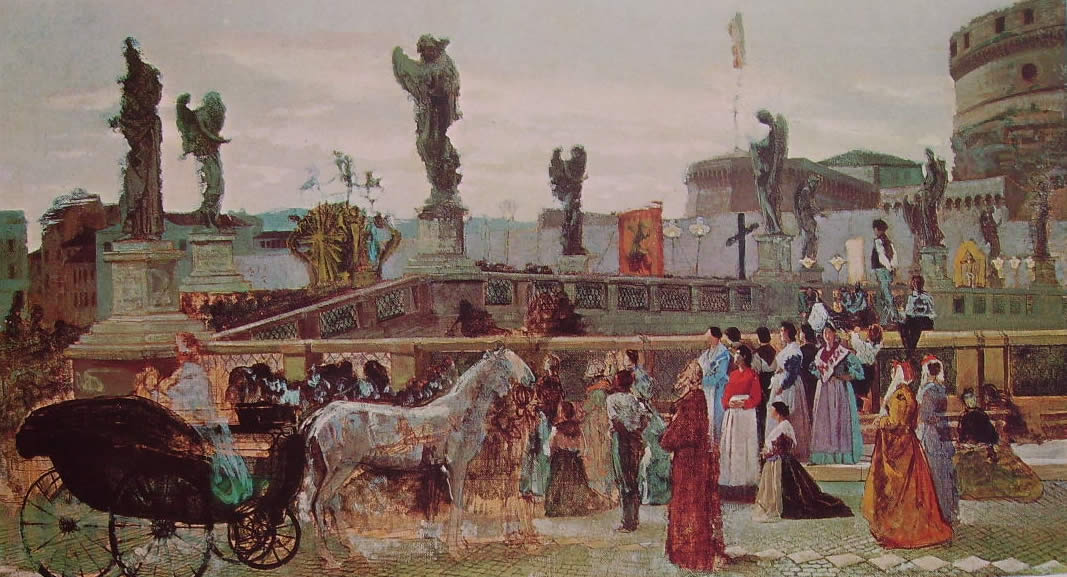
Ponte Sant'Angelo

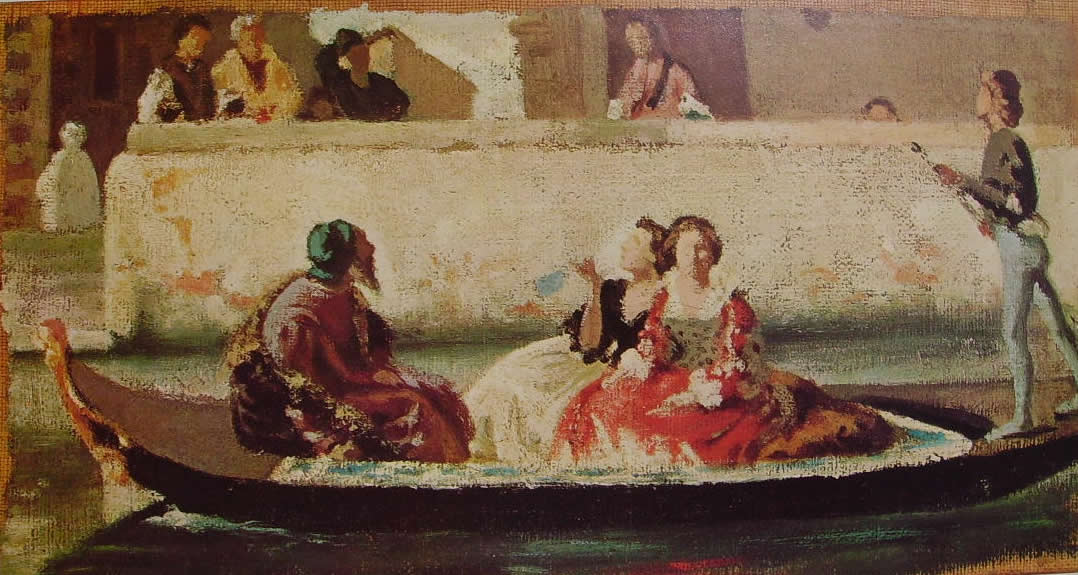
The Reader

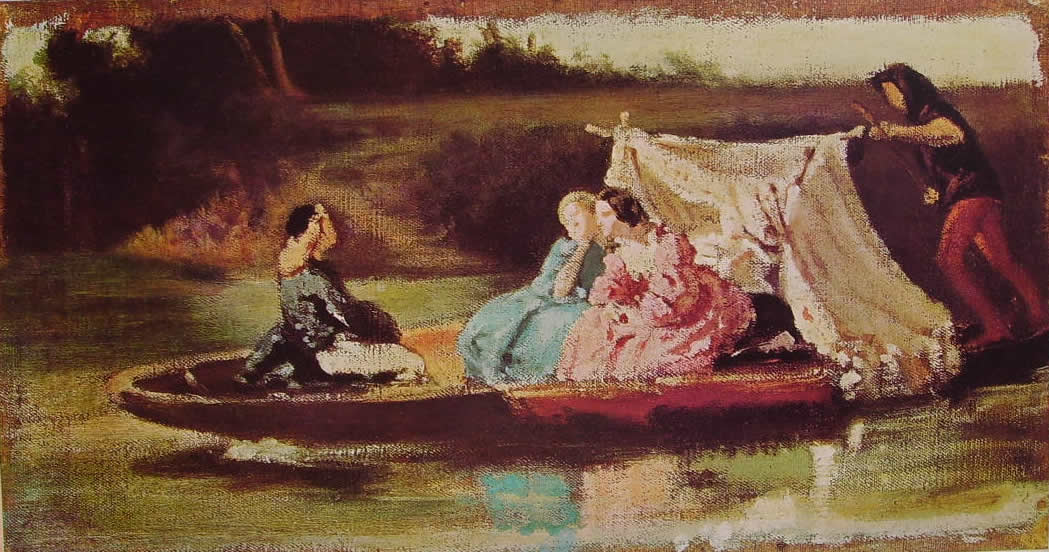
Titian's Gondola

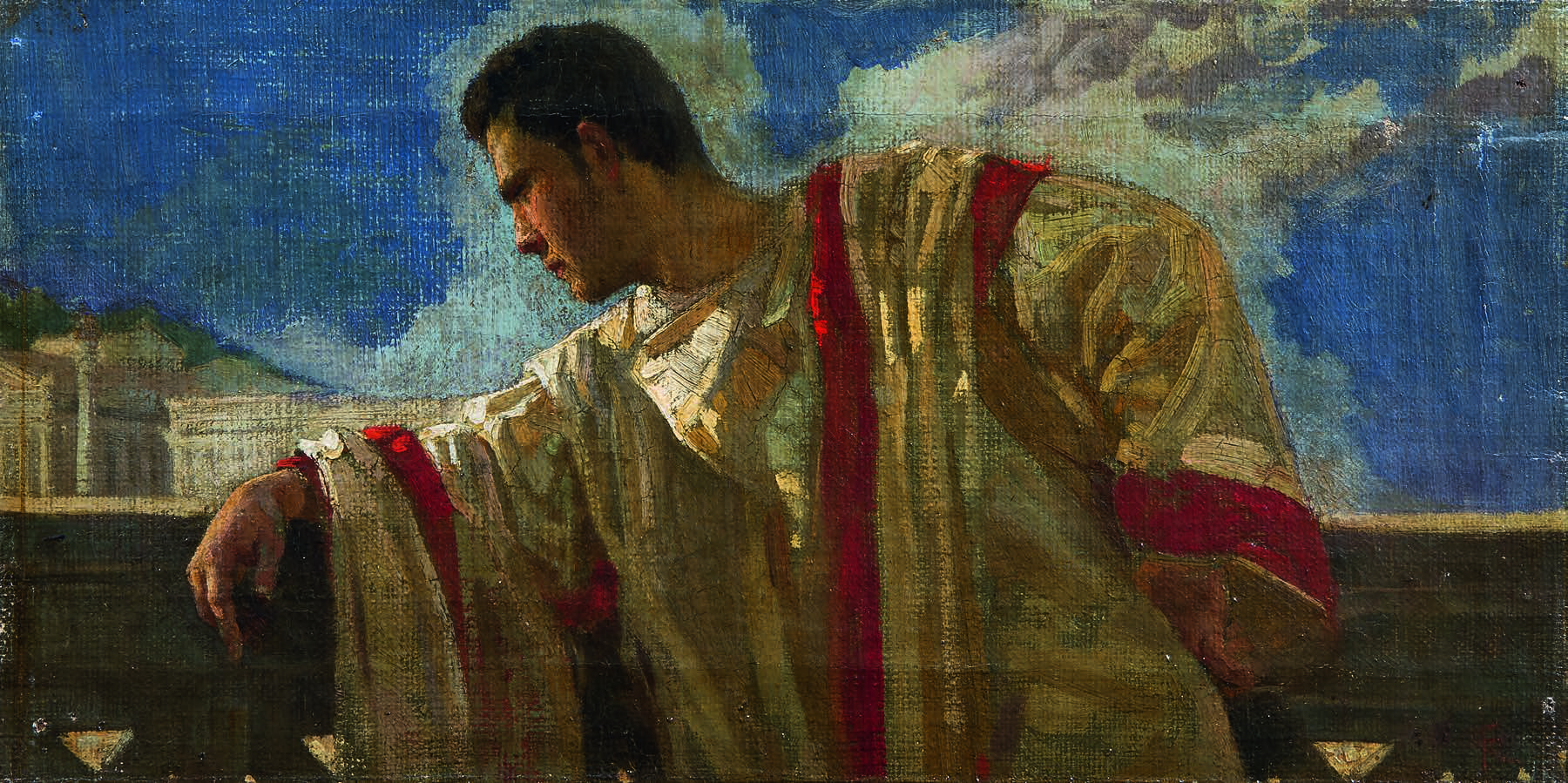
Catilina
