= Tranquillo Cremona =

Italian painter (1837–1878)

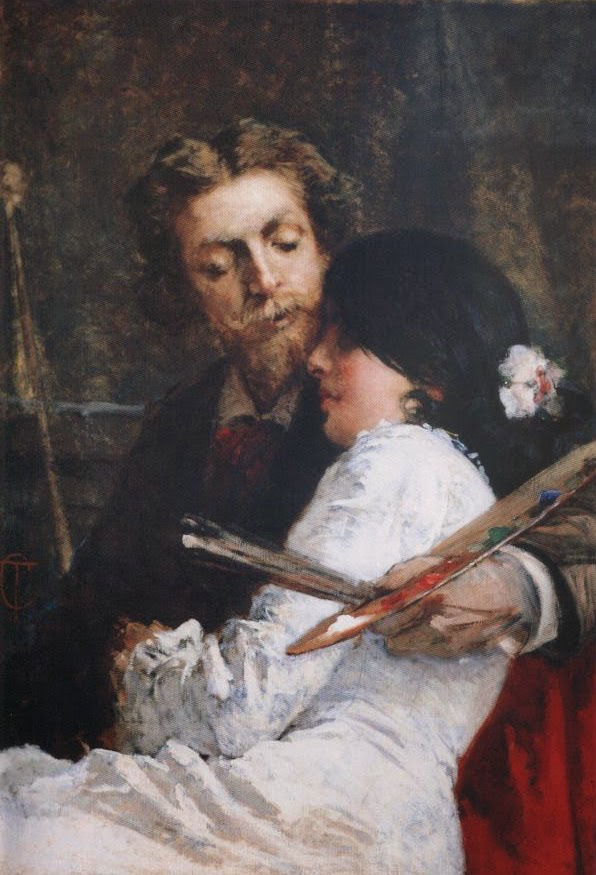
- The painter and the model, oil on canvas (1870-1872)
- Born: 10 April 1837; Pavia, Kingdom of Lombardy–Venetia
- Died: 10 July 1878 (aged 41); Milan, Kingdom of Italy
- Education: Brera Academy
- Known for: Painting
- Movement: Scapigliatura

Tranquillo Cremona (10 April 1837 – 10 June 1878) was an Italian painter. His paintings have a windswept style, lacking the linearity of Francesco Hayez and other academics. His technique recalls the pittura de tocco e di macchia (painting of touch and dots) practiced by painters such as Titian, Rembrandt, and 18th-century Northern Italian Baroque masters such as Giuseppe Maria Crespi, Francesco Guardi, Giovanni Battista Piazzetta, and Giuseppe Bazzani.

== Biography ==
=== Early life and education ===
Tranquillo Cremona was born in Pavia (Lombardy), then part of the Austrian-controlled Kingdom of Lombardy–Venetia. His elder brother was the mathematician Luigi Cremona. He trained at the art school in Pavia with Giacomo Trécourt and Giovanni Carnovali. He moved to Venice in 1852, where he lived alongside his half-brother, the lawyer Giacomo Cremona.

In 1859 Cremona moved to Piedmont to avoid military service with the Imperial Austrian Army. After the liberation of Lombardy by the Piedmontese he settled in Milan. There he enrolled at the Brera Academy, where he was taught by Francesco Hayez and Giuseppe Bertini, in whose private studio he was also permitted to work. Fellow students included Daniele Ranzoni and Mosè Bianchi.

=== Early career ===
Cremona exhibited for the first time at the annual Brera exhibition of 1859, showing The Falconer (Galleria d'Arte Moderna, Milan). In 1862, having established his own studio, Cremona exhibited his first large-scale oil painting at the Brera Annual: A Visit to the Tomb of Romeo and Juliet (Galleria d'Arte Moderna, Milan), a literary–historical subject depicted in a ‘classical–romantic’ vein. Very clearly the product of the stimuli assimilated from Cremona’s previous artistic experiences, it nevertheless revealed an independent mind at work.

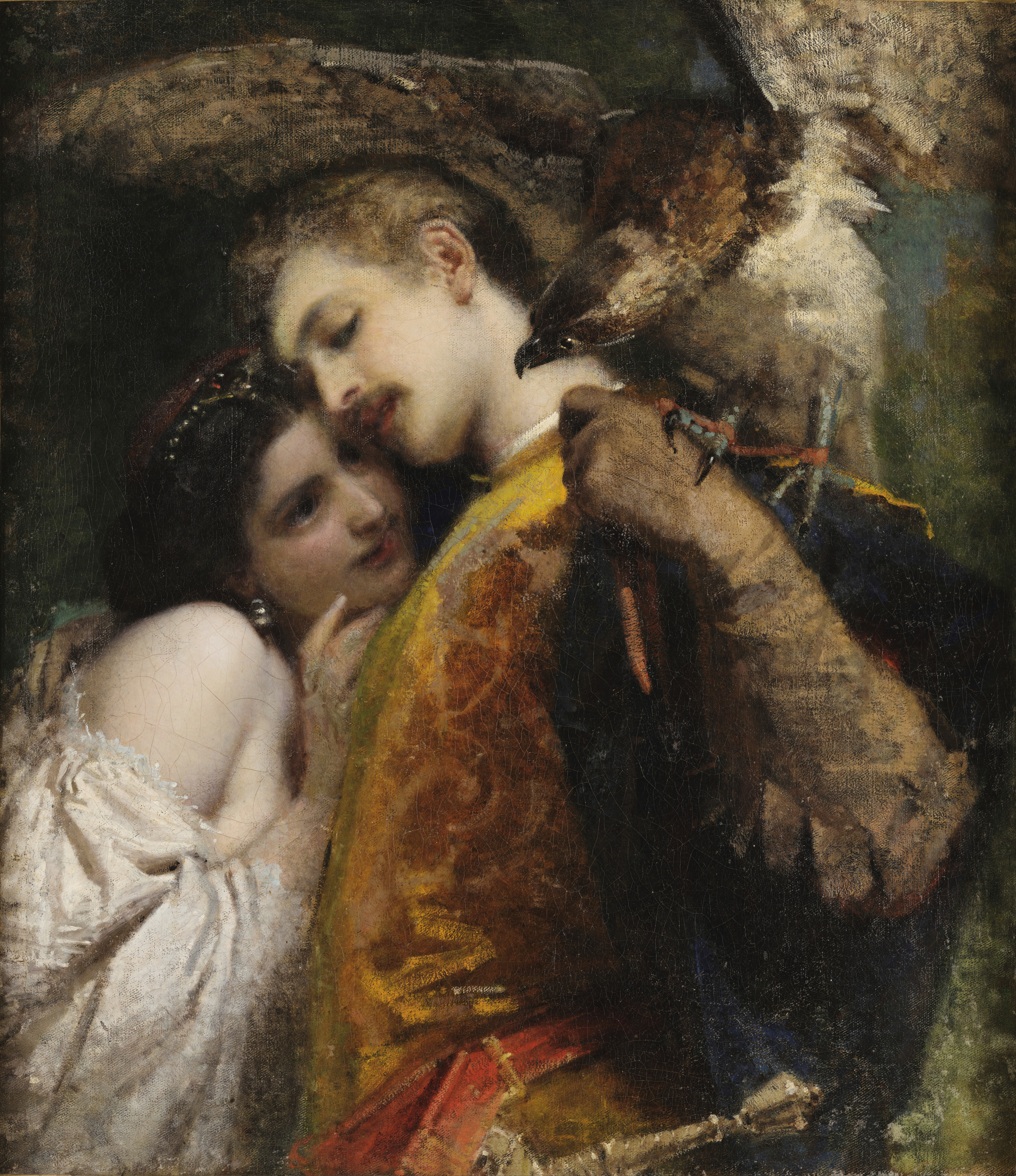
The Falconer, 1863, Galleria d'Arte Moderna, Milan

At the Brera Annual the following year Cremona showed two canvases that received considerable attention from the critics: the large-scale Marco Polo Presented by his Father to Kublai, Grand Khan of the Tatars (1863; Rome, Galleria Nazionale d'Arte Moderna), which was partly a product of the current vogue for large history paintings, preferably celebrating the glories of Italy, and partly derived from the examples of Hayez, Trécourt and Federico Faruffini; and his second, more complex version of The Falconer ( 1863; Galleria d'Arte Moderna, Milan), in which Cremona can be seen to be moving towards his own, less distinctly derivative style. Cremona had by now rejected the popular form of anecdotal genre painting practised in Milan by the brothers Gerolamo and Domenico Induno and their followers, and he was looking more closely at the softness of outline achieved by Carnovali. The passionate but at the same time guarded expressions of the lovers and the pervasive sense of nostalgia, conveyed in muted tones, create a charged atmosphere that recurs throughout the artist’s oeuvre.

=== Scapigliatura ===
In Milan, Cremona had become friendly with the members of the Scapigliatura. The movement, characterized by bohemian attitudes, included poets, writers, musicians and artists, and was infused with a combination of rebellious tendencies. Cremona began producing drawings, and especially caricatures, for several Milanese newspapers and periodicals such as Fanfulla della domenica and Uomo di pietra, to which a number of the Scapigliati writers contributed. Along with Ranzoni and the sculptor Giuseppe Grandi, he rapidly became identified as one of the official artists of the Scapigliatura movement. Its literary members included Guido Pisa, Cremona’s first serious biographer, and Carlo Dossi, with whom Cremona became especially friendly.

Through the Scapigliati, a number of whom were socially well-connected, Cremona received several commissions for portraits from the Milanese bourgeoisie, for example, the lawyer Emilio Marozzi (1869; Milan, E. Marozzi priv. col.). The muted tones, soft outlines and concentration on the subject rather than on surrounding details showed that Cremona had been looking still more closely at Carnovali. Most Milanese patrons, however, accustomed to the more elaborately ‘finished’ pieces by Hayez and Giuseppe Molteni, refused to be drawn to Cremona’s more subtle, alternative form of portraiture.

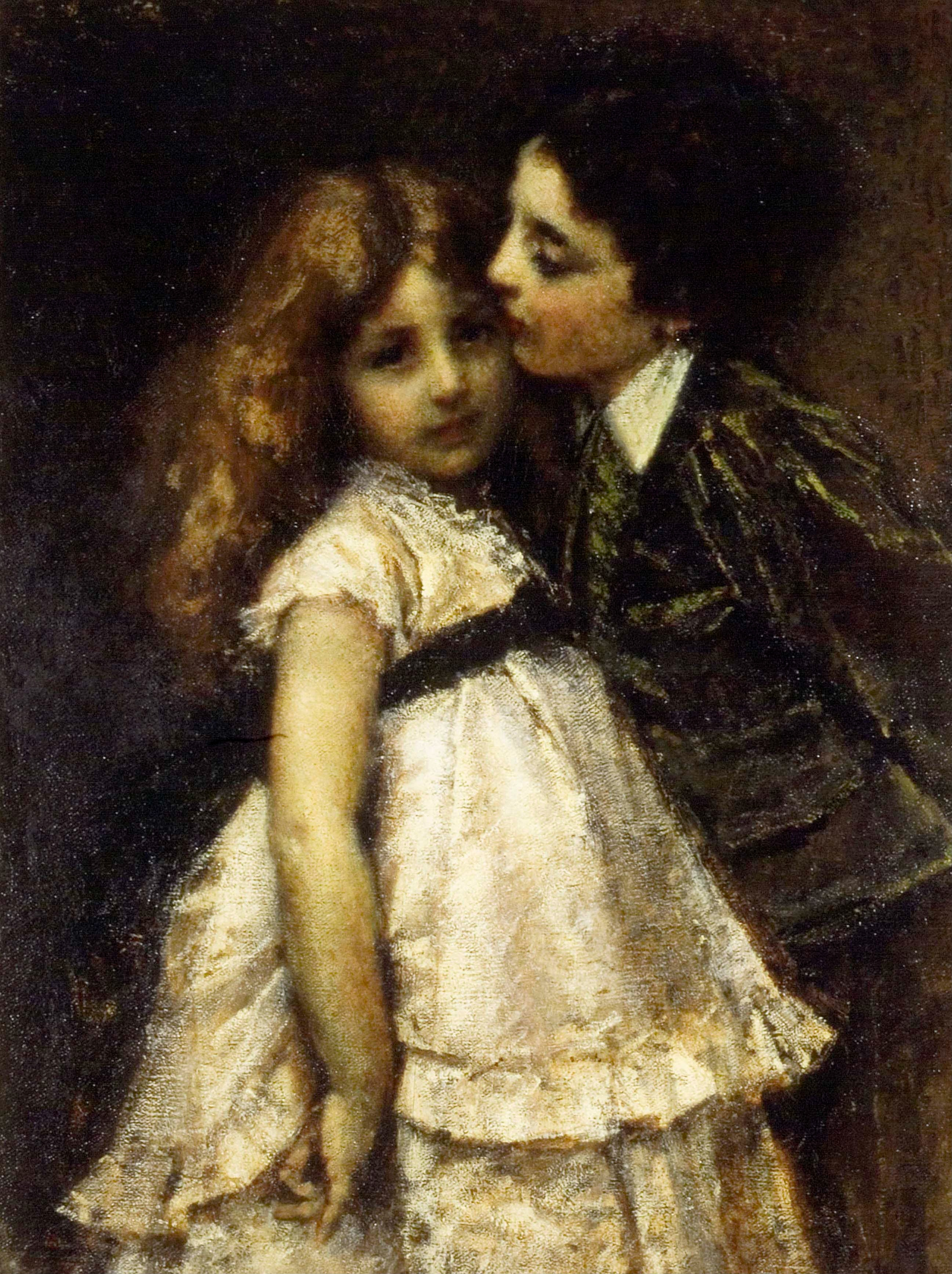
Two Cousins, 1870, Rome, Galleria Nazionale d'Arte Moderna

Cremona’s sitters were frequently Scapigliati themselves or members of their families. Most notable among these portraits, for their psychological penetration of character and rendering of colour and space, are those of Alberto Carlo and Guido Pisani Dossi (both 1867; priv. col.). In 1870, Cremona again attracted the attention of the critics with The Kiss, later retitled the Two Cousins (1870; Rome, Galleria Nazionale d'Arte Moderna).

This success led Cremona in two directions: first, he expanded his activity as a portrait painter, the most important commission being for portraits of Signor Deschamps (1875; Milan, Gaspare Gussoni priv. col.) and Signora Deschamps (1875; Galleria d'Arte Moderna, Milan), which is one of Cremona’s most outstanding mature works. Secondly, he executed a series of paintings and watercolours, a medium with which he had recently begun to experiment, in which he investigated not only the effects of light and colour but also the various forms of sentiment expressed between children and young people, frequently turning his attention to the repressed sensuality of their emotions, as in Attraction (1874; Galleria d'Arte Moderna, Milan). These works were frequently supplied with frivolous or allegorical titles.

One of Cremona's masterpieces, the outstanding painting La Melodia (1874, private collection), dates back to this period. It shows a woman at a piano, in an impressionist style, face leaning partially away, challenging us to view the musical composition as the subject of the brushstrokes, instead of persons or dimensional objects.

Cremona extended his interest in personal relationships by investigating (in secular rather than religious terms) the mother and child theme, for example Maternal Love (1873; Galleria d'Arte Moderna, Milan). This may have been prompted by the birth of his first child in 1873. Through these two series Cremona developed a penetrating insight into emotions. At times his work was overpoweringly sentimental, but at his best he produced such impressive pieces as Ivy (1878; Turin Civic Gallery of Modern and Contemporary Art). This work, commissioned by Benedetto Junck, was his last completed oil painting, and it made an immense impact on Milanese cultural circles. The way in which Cremona portrayed the two lovers, a common theme in his work, was completely alien to the Realist painters. Ivy marked the culmination of Cremona’s attempts, influenced by Scapigliati's ideas, to produce passionate yet ambiguous intensity using evanescent luminosity and simplified forms.

In 1878, Cremona was nominated head of the art school at Pavia, but he died a few months later, reportedly as a result of the poison accumulated from his habit of mixing lead-based paints on his arm. Vittore Grubicy de Dragon organized a retrospective exhibition of Cremona’s paintings in the Ridotto della Scala in the same year. This exhibition was highly successful, and as a result, the prices of Cremona’s paintings rose considerably. Grubicy continued to promote Cremona’s work in his articles and the exhibitions he organized, and Cremona remained popular for many years.

=== Working methods and technique ===
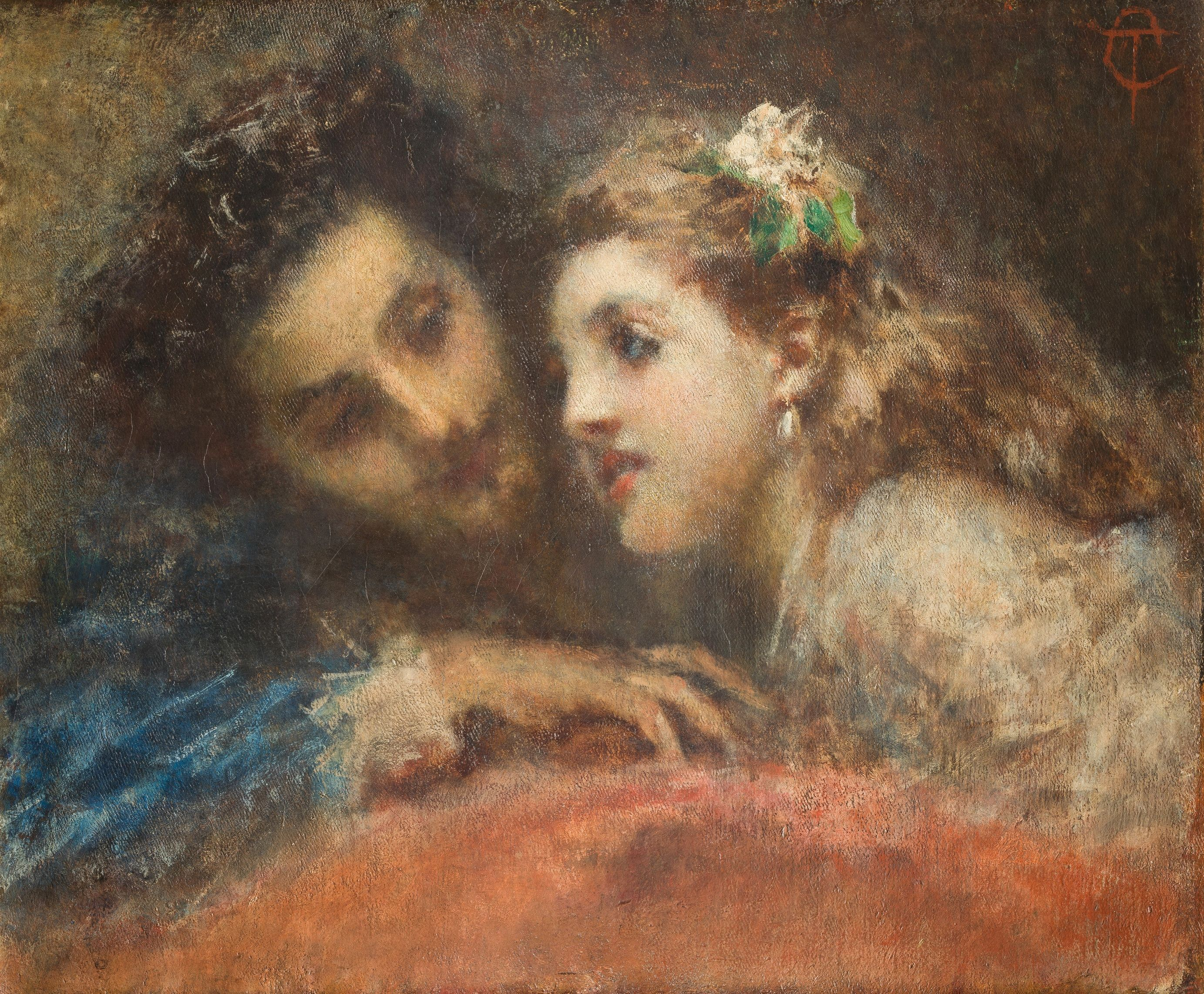
Attraction, 1874, Galleria d'Arte Moderna, Milan

Cremona introduced to Lombardy a dynamically new way of approaching a painting. In his attempt to capture the feeling of the moment, the innuendo behind each brief glance and gesture, he is said to have virtually thrown his paint on to the canvas (which usually lay on the floor, as he disliked working from an easel); he worked furiously, frequently working on more than one canvas, directed only by the inspiration of the moment.

He preferred to transfer his ideas directly onto the canvas. Similarly, most of his drawings were preliminary sketches. He was able to superimpose colours without losing the quality of transparency and translucency to the medium. High Life (1877; Galleria d'Arte Moderna, Milan) and Curious Girls (Codogno, Fond. Lamberti) are superbly delicate, remarkable examples of late 19th-century Italian watercolour painting. Highly prized, these works became more valuable than the artist’s oil paintings.

In his oils, Cremona also succeeded in maintaining a sense of luminosity by using ‘vaporous’, superimposed brushstrokes. Expansive, interlayered but still translucent brushwork and a greater fluidity are visible in all of Cremona’s mature works. This method, in which Cremona was clearly more interested in defining space through luminous colour effects rather than sharply delineated form, was, inevitably, misunderstood by the majority of his contemporaries. Many patrons and fellow artists clung to the traditional interpretation of what was intended by a ‘finished’ painting – the work of Hayez, for example – to which Cremona’s work definitely did not correspond. The artist was frequently accused of presenting worked-up preparatory studies as finished paintings, although when it came to rendering the appearance and quality of a lady’s attire, Cremona was by no means inferior to Hayez, merely different in approach. This lack of comprehension was partially due to the inability of language to express what Cremona was visually attempting to do. Many critics fell back on the literary–musical vocabulary formulated by the Scapigliati writers.

Cremona differed from many of his contemporaries also in his choice of subject matter, which relates to his style and technique. He produced virtually no landscapes (unlike Ranzoni); relatively few works inspired by religious, mythological, historial or literary themes; a very large number of portraits (characteristic of all the Scapigliati artists); and many figure studies, especially among his watercolours. Common to his portraits and figure studies (and perhaps also deriving from his watercolour technique) was Cremona’s elimination of all irrelevant detail. His barren backgrounds and surroundings, so completely at variance with those of Mosè Bianchi or the Induno brothers, are rendered by large areas of luminous colour that force the viewer to concentrate on the psychological content of the picture. Cremona probably limited his subject-matter in order to focus more closely on the qualities of the light reflected by his sitters.

The nature of the artistic relationship between Cremona and Ranzoni and the extent to which one influenced the other are unclear. The two artists were intimate friends and at one stage even shared a studio; both were closely connected with the literary–musical set of the Scapigliati; and their work displays many similarities in approach. Cremona is known to have proclaimed Ranzoni as his real master on more than one occasion, but the situation was probably far more complex; at the very least, a continuous exchange of ideas must have existed.

== Selected paintings ==
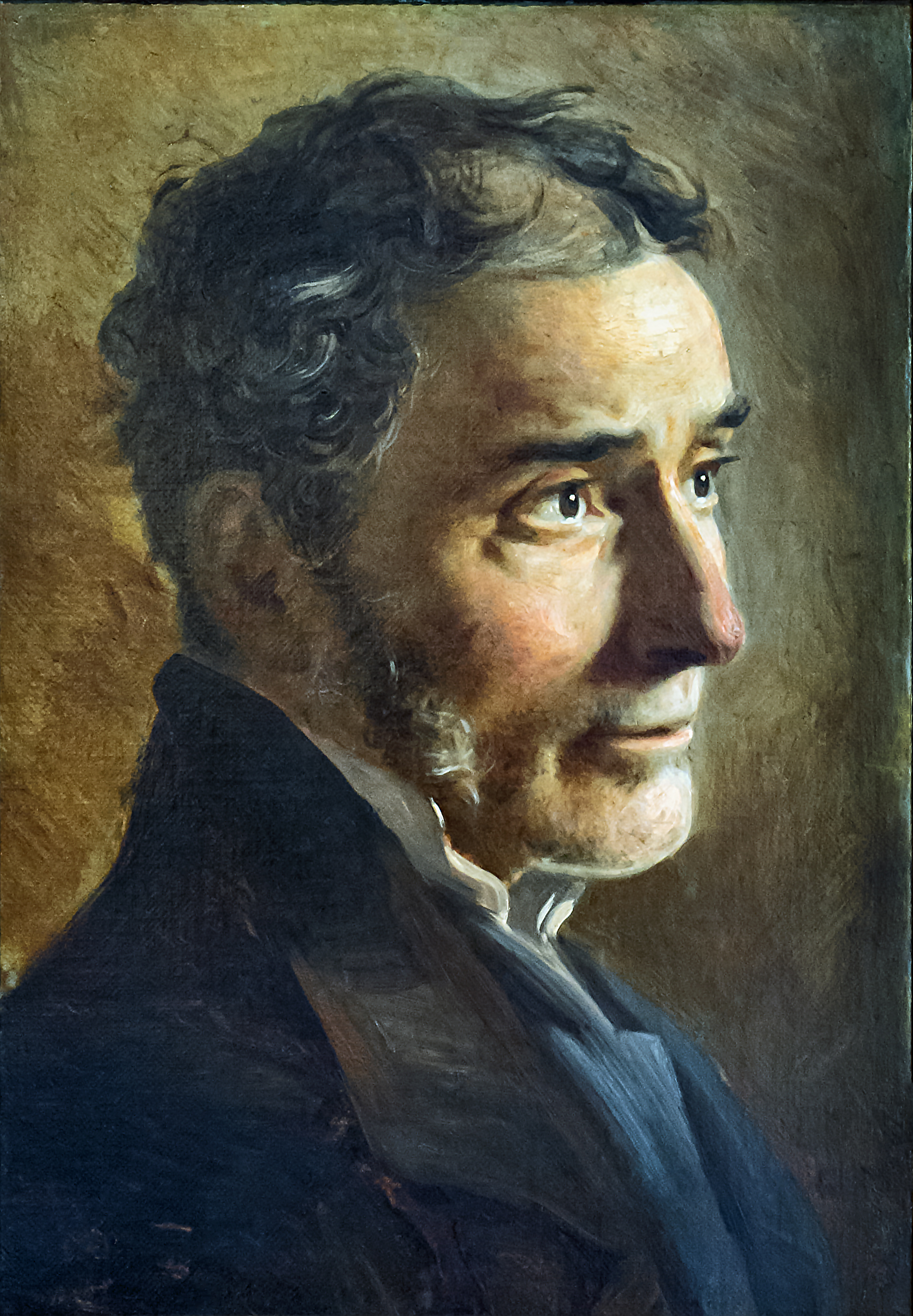
Portrait of Ludovico Lipparini (1858)

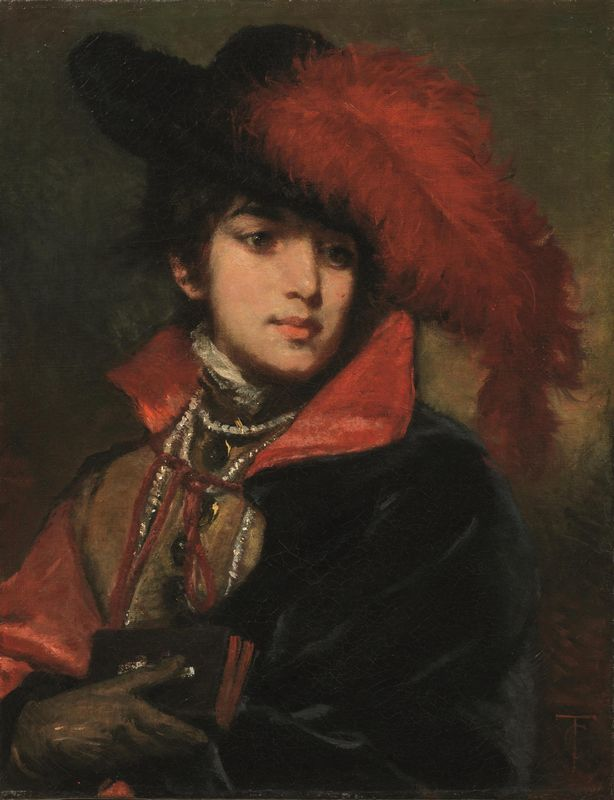
Portrait of a lady with a red feather (c. 1859)

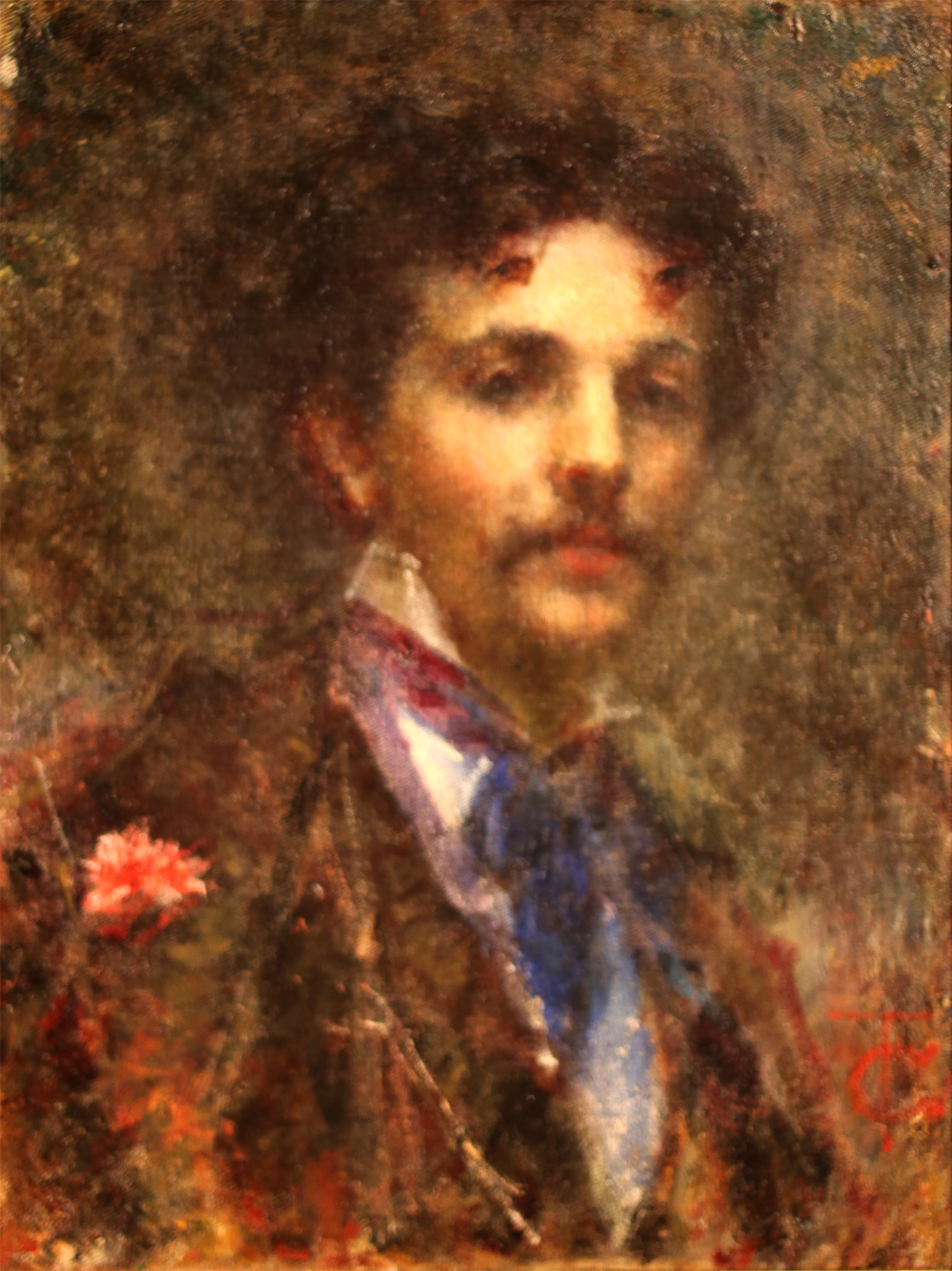
Portrait of Luigi Luvoni (1872)

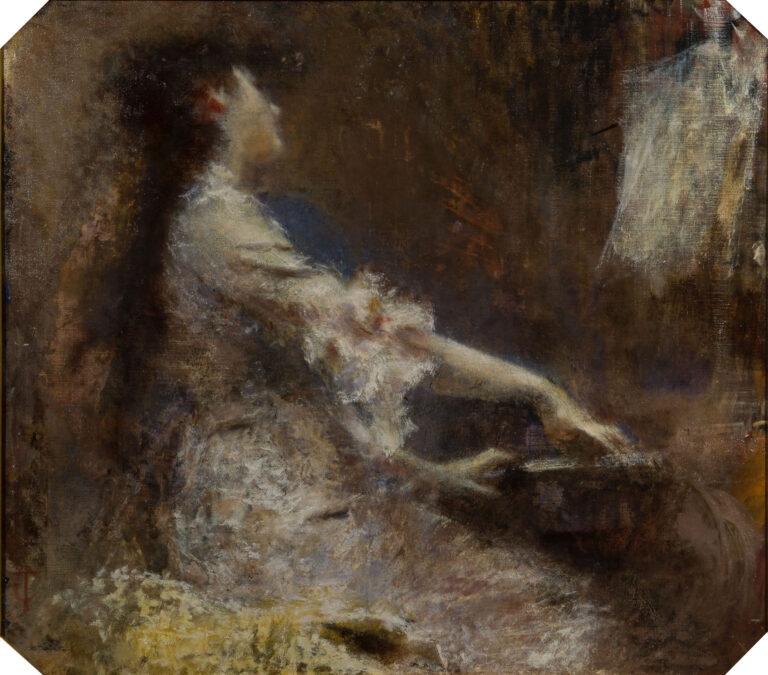
Melody

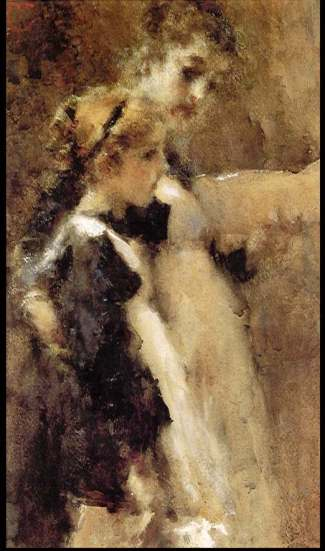
Repeating the Lesson (1876)

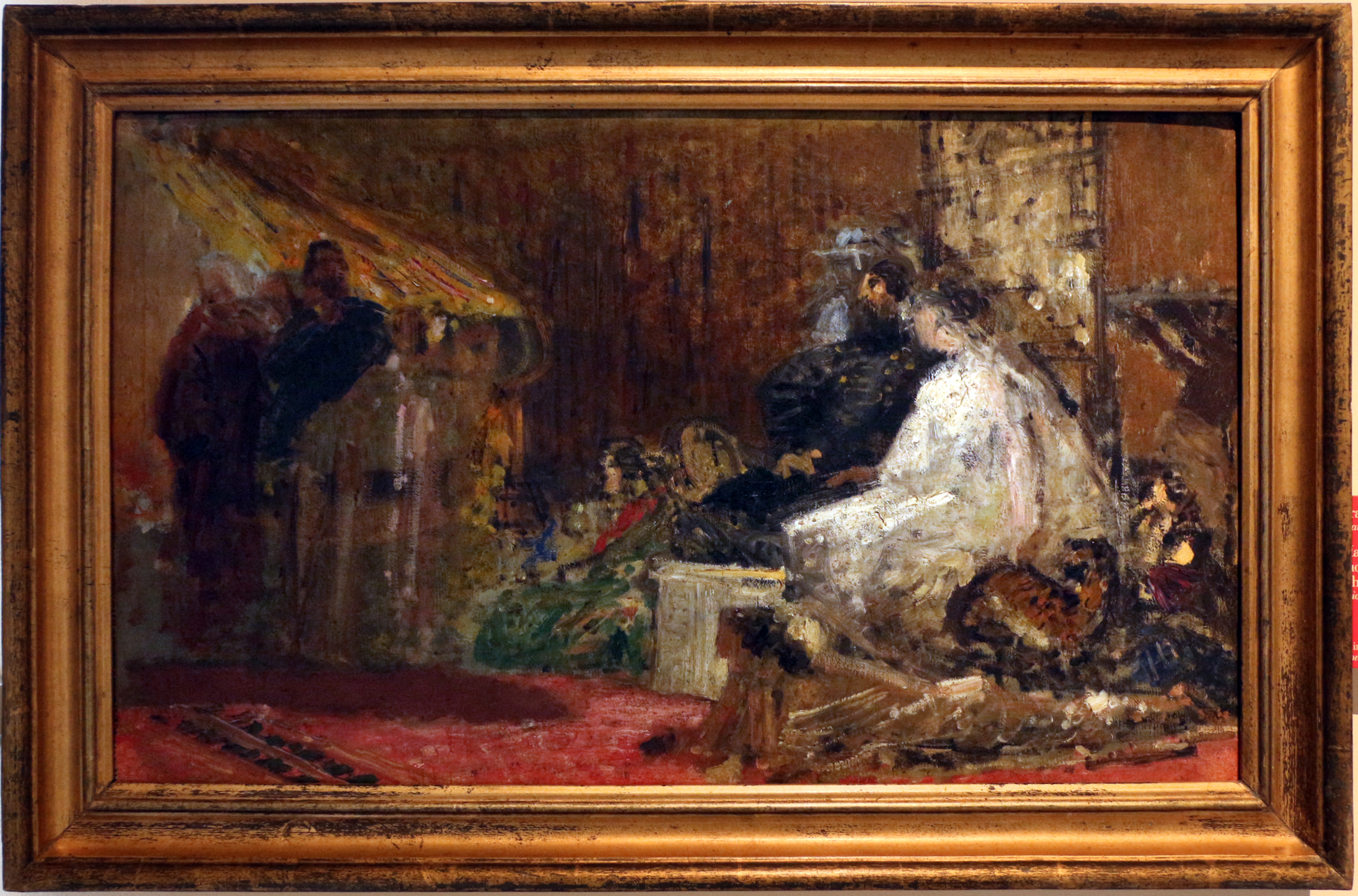
Marco Polo before the Grand Khan (1863)

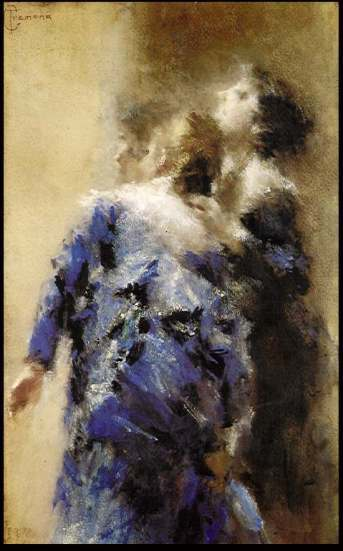
The Curious Women (1877)

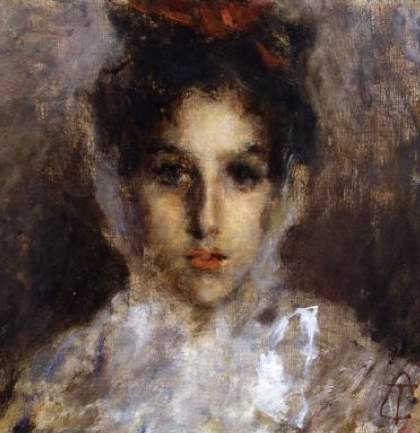
Sick Young Woman (1877)

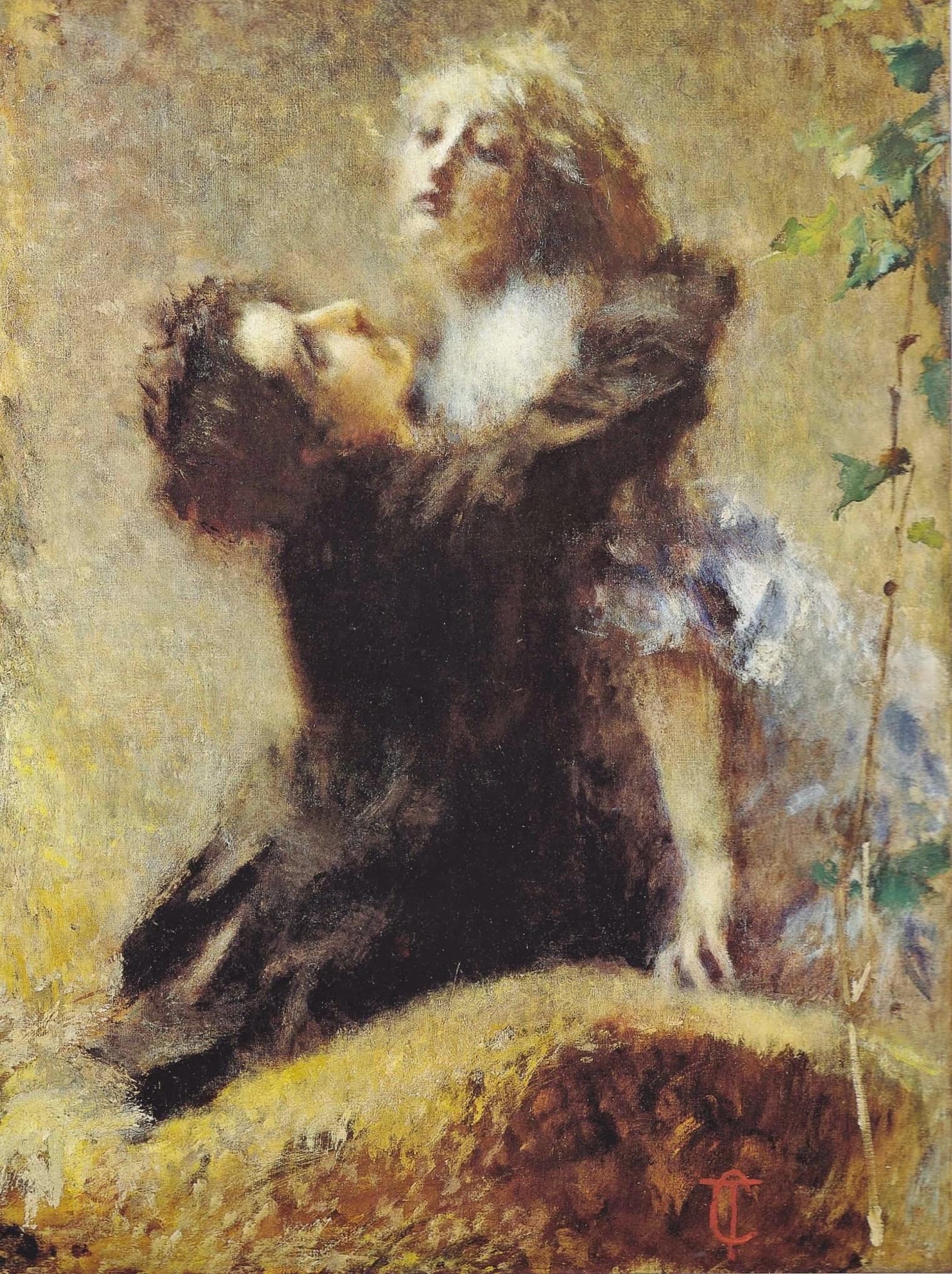
Ivy (1878)
The male figure is the composer Alfredo Catalani

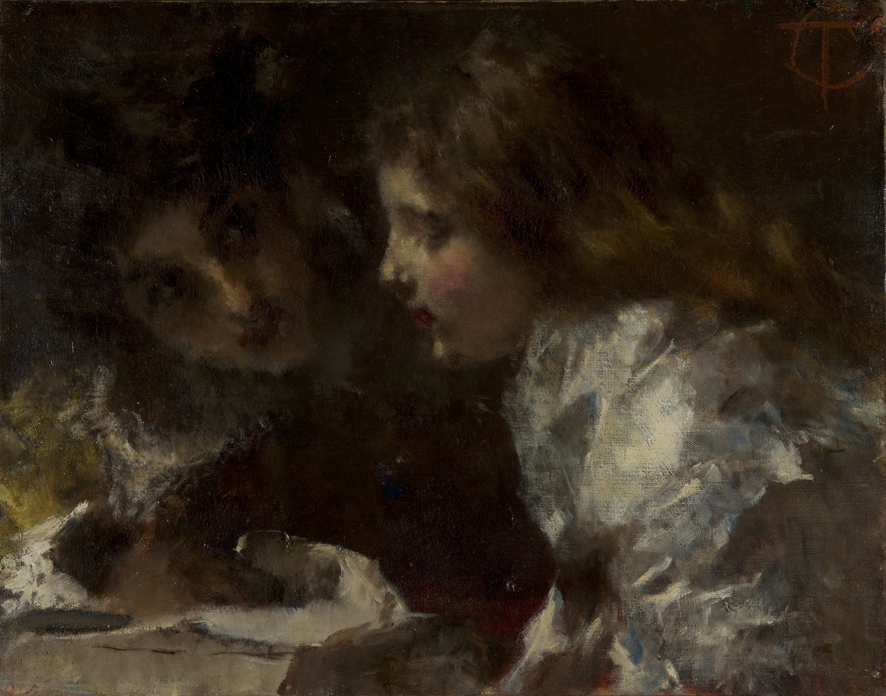
Two children (1878)

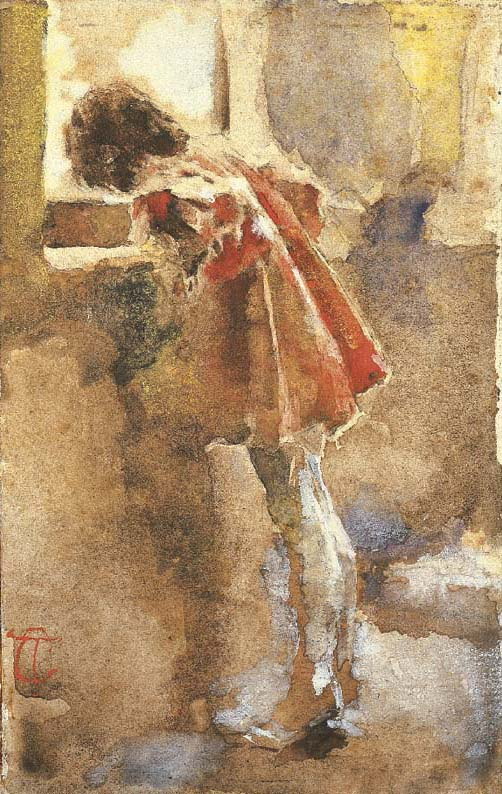
Curious boy (1878)

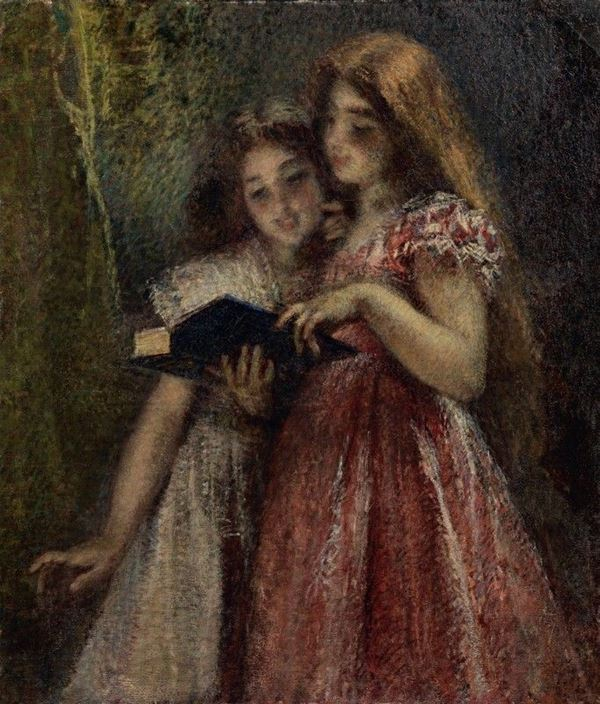
Girls studying (1872)

== Sources ==
- Pino Adami, Alessandra (1984). "CREMONA, Tranquillo". Dizionario Biografico degli Italiani (in Italian). Vol. 30: Cosattini–Crispolto. Rome: Istituto dell'Enciclopedia Italiana. ISBN 978-88-12-00032-6.
