= Daniele Ranzoni =

Italian painter (1843–1889)

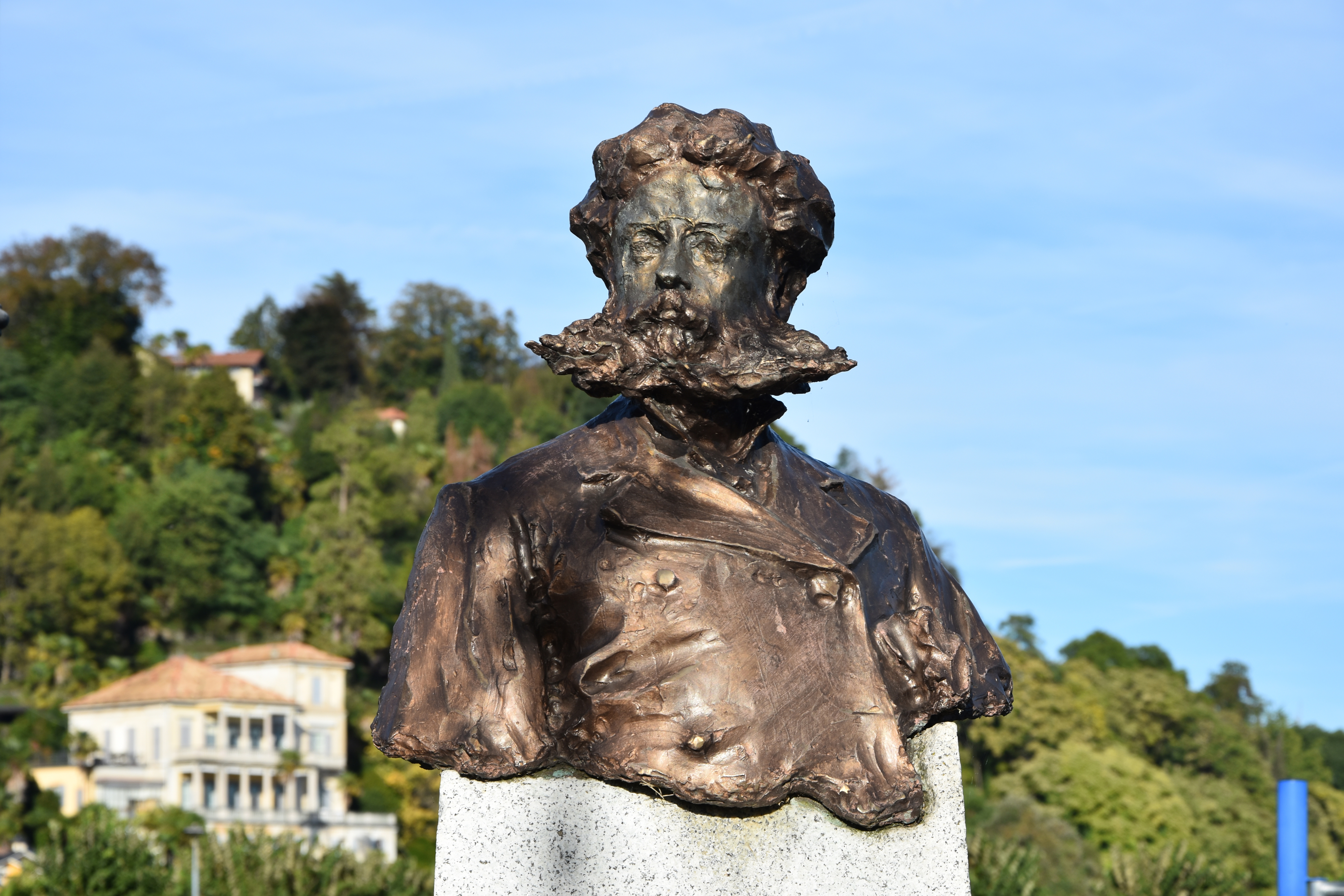
- Monument in Intra to Ranzoni by Trubetzkoy
- Born: 3 December 1843; Intra, Kingdom of Sardinia
- Died: 20 October 1889 (aged 45); Intra, Kingdom of Italy
- Known for: Painting
- Movement: Scapigliatura

Daniele Ranzoni (1843–1889) was an Italian painter of second half of the 19th century. A leading painter of the Milanese Scapigliatura, Ranzoni is also considered as the first of the Italian Divisionists.

== Biography ==
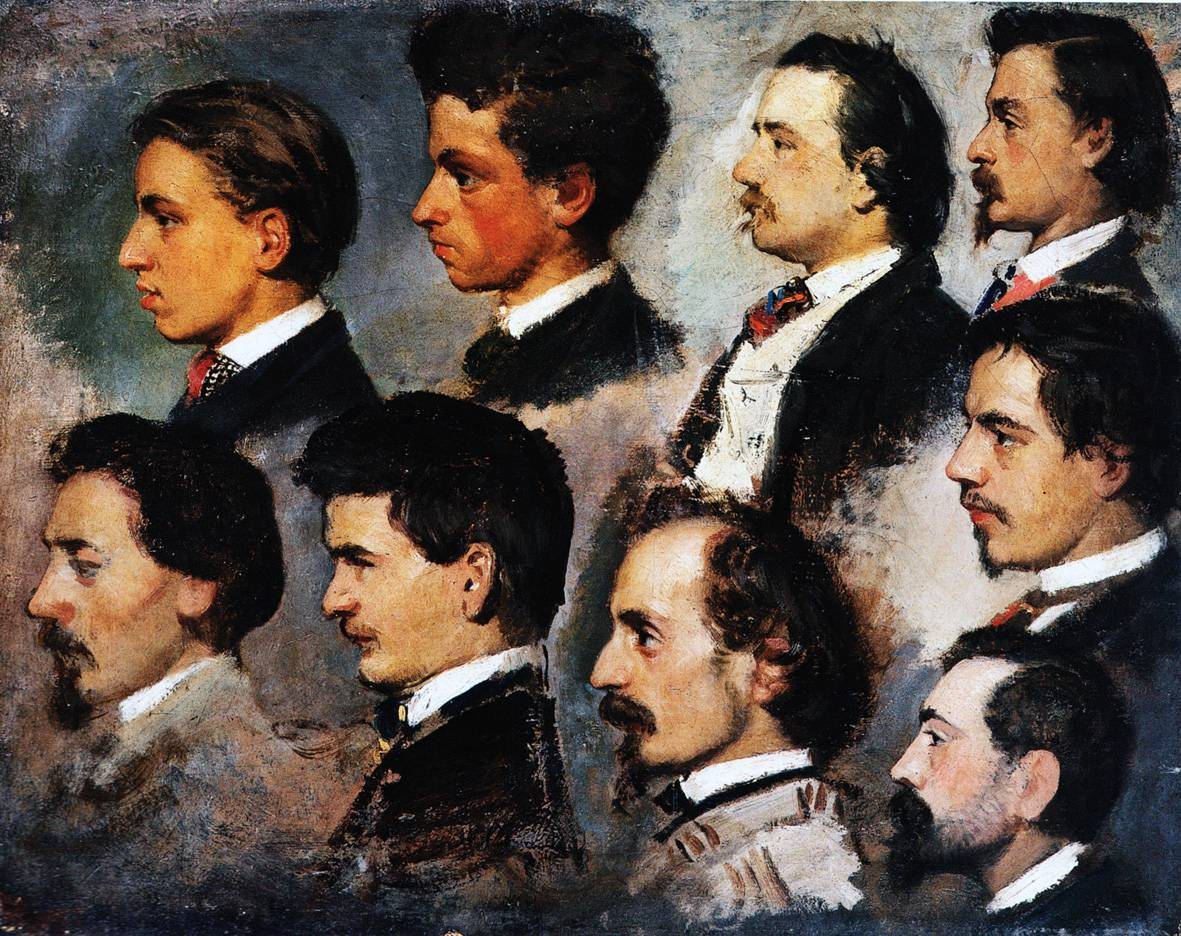
Ernesto Fontana, Some of the students from the Giuseppe Bertini studio at the Brera Academy (1862)

Daniele Ranzoni was born to a working-class family (his father was a cobbler), in Intra, Novara, a town today incorporated into the municipality of Verbania-Pallanza on the Piedmont side of Lake Maggiore.

He was taught by Giuseppe Bertini a remarkable teacher who encouraged his pupils to sketch from nature and experiment with primary colors. During this period he met the painters Mosè Bianchi, Filippo Carcano, Luigi Luvoni, Tranquillo Cremona and the sculptor Giuseppe Grandi.

His friendship and shared aesthetics with Cremona and Grandi gave rise, in the 1870s, to a revolutionary style in the visual arts, known as Scapigliatura, a movement rightly considered the first Italian avant-garde in the visual art. Ranzoni's technique does not delineate shapes but instead builds forms through nuances of colors. Vibrant splashes of color are applied directly on the canvas, without preliminary drawing, in a cursory brushwork that emphasizes tonal nuances, and suggests volumes and contrasts of light. The revolutionary manner initiated by Ranzoni and Cremona in the 1870s is similar to what the Impressionist group achieved in Paris in the same decade. However, while the former were mostly interested in translating the immediacy of the vision and tended to concentrate on landscape, Ranzoni and the Scapigliati neglected out of door painting, preferring to concentrate on portraiture, the expression of emotions, intensity of moods and psychological introspection.

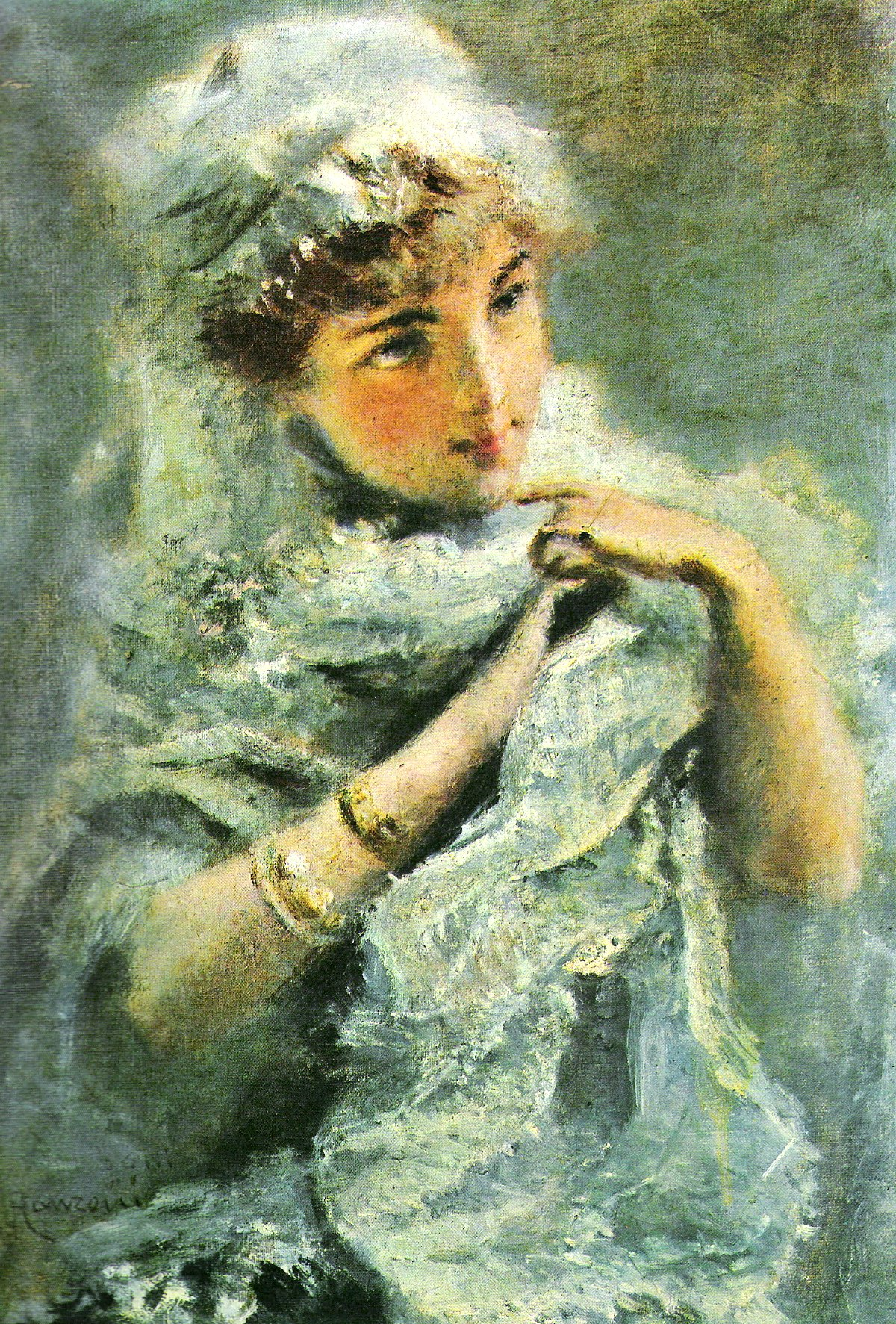
Portrait of a young English girl, 1886

Ranzoni is essentially a portrait painter. In facts, he became the artist of the international milieu of aristocratic expats that gathered around Lake Maggiore in the 1870s and 1880s. Living between Milan and his native Intra, he had a liaison with Ada Troubetzkoy, an American opera singer who had married Prince Pierre Troubetzkoy, scion of an important Russian family. She was mother of three boys, whose artistic education she entrusted to Ranzoni. Two of these pupils became artists, Paul Troubetzkoy, the internationally renowned Belle Époque sculptor and Pierre, the society painter. Ada had introduced Ranzoni of the privileged society who frequented Lake Maggiore. He became their painter and owing to their connections he was invited to England where he spent two years as painter of the English gentry (1878/1879).

Upon his return, he had to face the demise of the cosmopolitan society which he had portrayed with so much insight. In Milan, after the death of Cremona (July 1878), the Scapigliatura of the street happenings and of the endless debates in the "Osterie" was but a memory. On Lake Maggiore Villa Ada had been sold and the separation of the couple was destroying the family of Ranzoni’s ex-pupils. Around Lake Maggiore the expats were returning home, unable to resist the global economic crisis defined as "Long Depression" (1873–1896) in the Anglo-Saxon world, to differentiate it from the “Great Depression” of the 1930s. Bankruptcies and suicides were a daily occurrence. From 1880 to 1885 Ranzoni produced his most important works. Aware of the progressive destruction of his world, he reacted with a feverish activity accompanied by despair. A mental breakdown occurred and he was forcefully committed to the Psychiatric Hospital of Novara where he remained from March 22 to May 6, 1885. As if mental illness had intensified the acuteness of his vision, this tormented period (just before and immediately after the hospitalization) corresponds to the acme in Ranzoni’s evolution. He died on October 29, 1889, in Intra. The rare works produced between 1885 and his death, owing to their expressionist intensity are among the most moving of the late nineteenth century. They have become abstract creations in which the paint is spare to maximum and color reduced to two tones, or at time, simply to a chromatic scale of on tone, a palette of grays, whose nuances suggest not only the fleeting quality of light but also the estrangement of the artist in front of his sitter.

== Works ==
Ranzoni's paintings are mostly in private collections. Only eight Museums – all of them in Northern Italy – count Ranzoni’s paintings or drawings among their holdings.

The most important nucleus extant in public collections is divided between the Landscape Museum in Pallanza-Verbania and the civic collections in Milan, Galleria d’Arte Moderna and the Castello Sforzesco. The municipal "Galleria d’Arte Moderna Paolo e Adele Giannoni" in Novara holds in permanent loans the two paintings of the Collegio Caccia, Ritratto di Giovane Donna and Fratello e sorella. Since the publication of the Catalogue raisonné, Varese (Castello di Masnago) Biella (Museo Civico) and Pavia (Castello Visconteo) have acquired through donation one or two paintings, oil or watercolor. The Pinacoteca of the Fondzione Cassa di Risparmia in Tortona has bought The Portrait of the child Ettore Nicò.

== Selected paintings ==
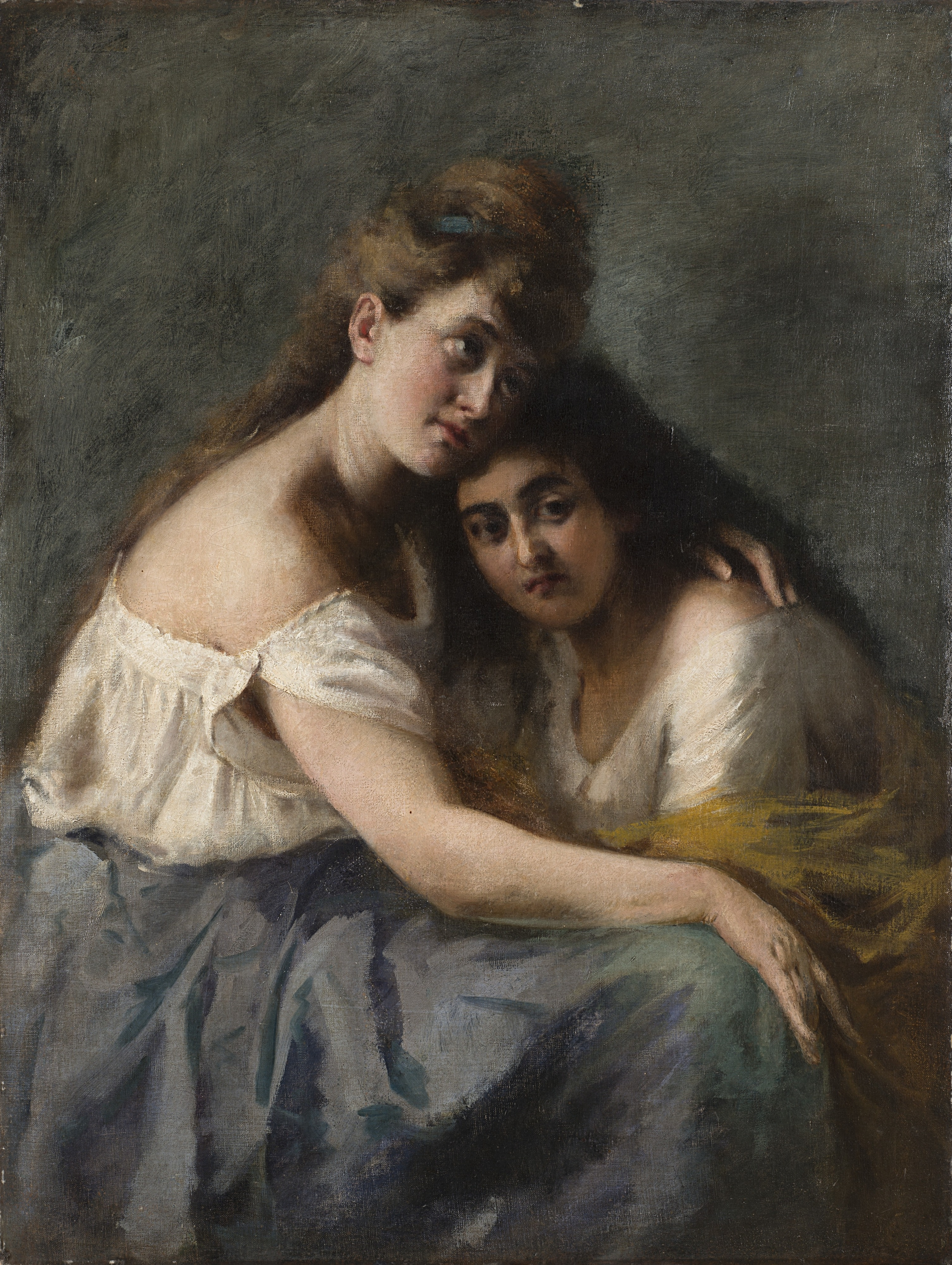
Portrait of two women (c. 1860-63)

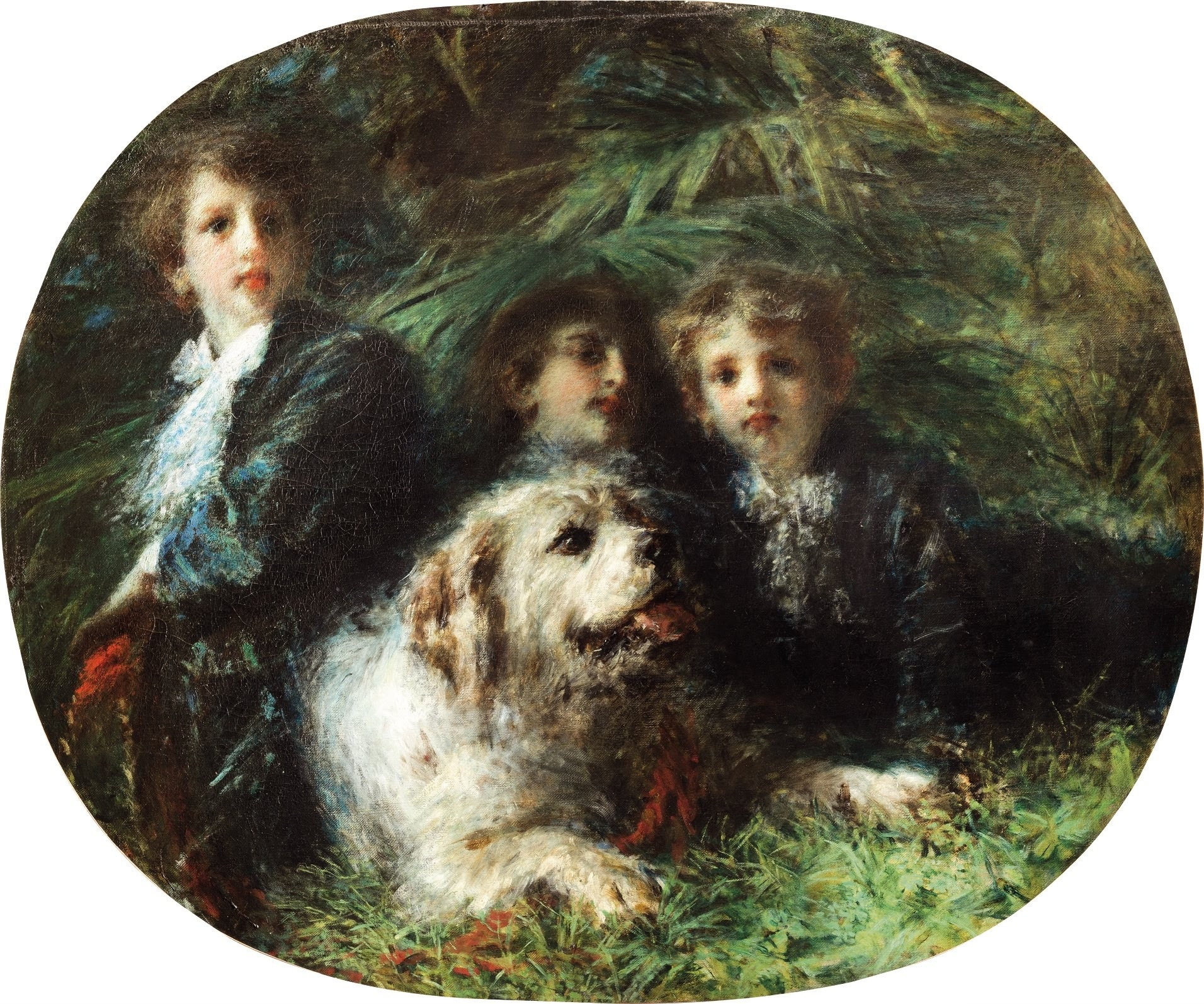
Prince Troubetzkoy's Children with Their Dog (1874)

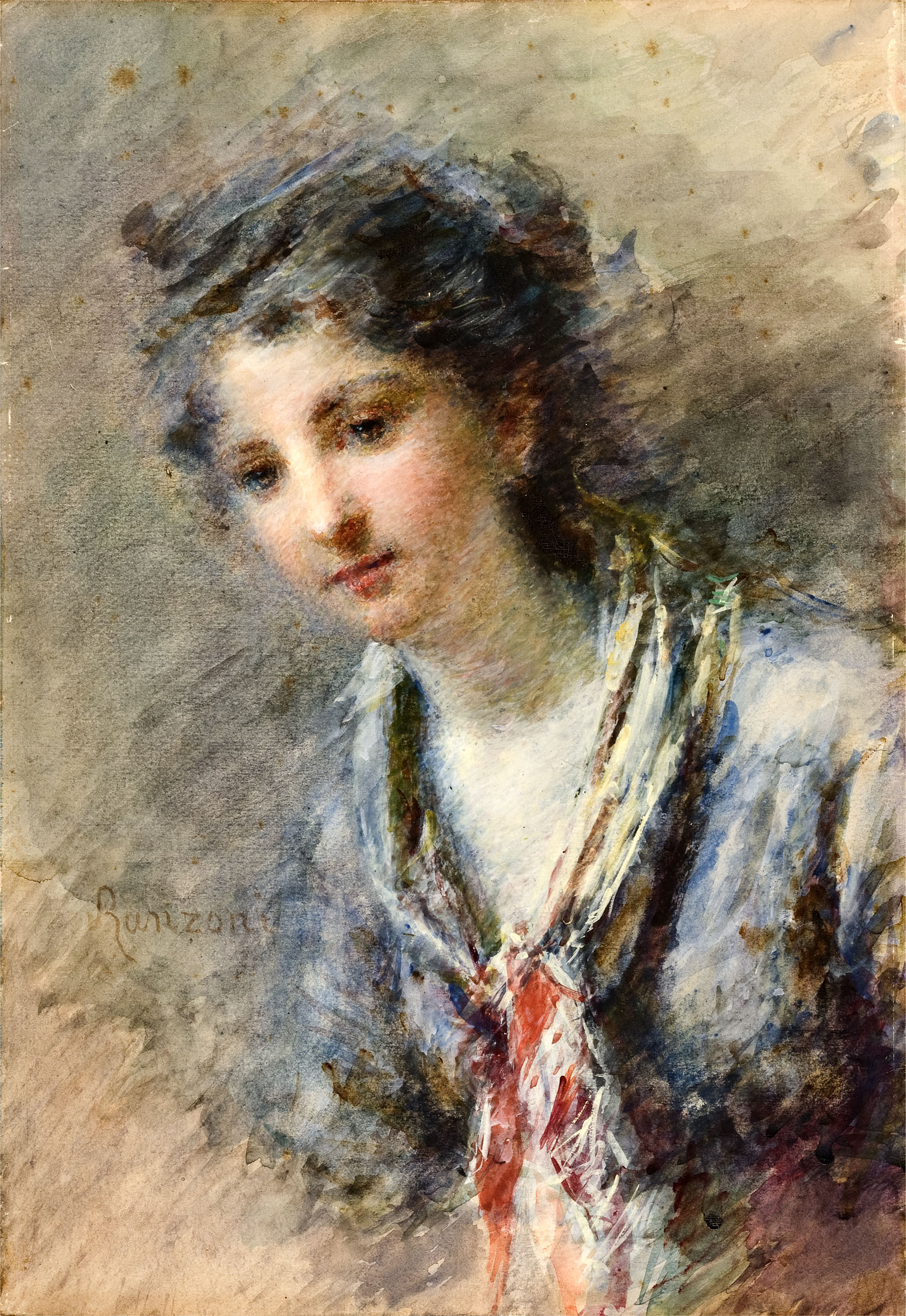
Portrait of Mrs. Uglietti (c. 1876)

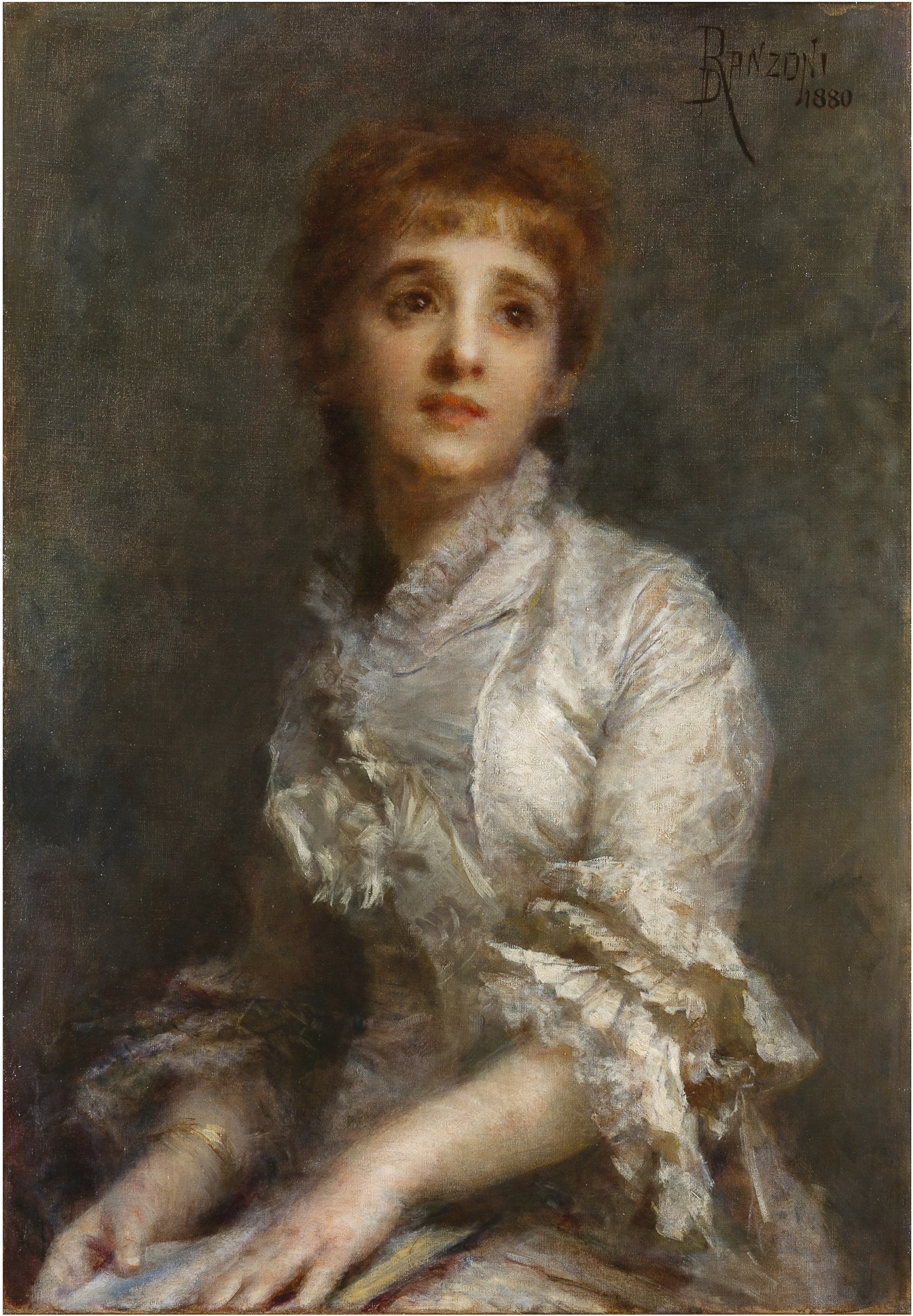
Portrait of Mrs. Pisani Dossi (1880)

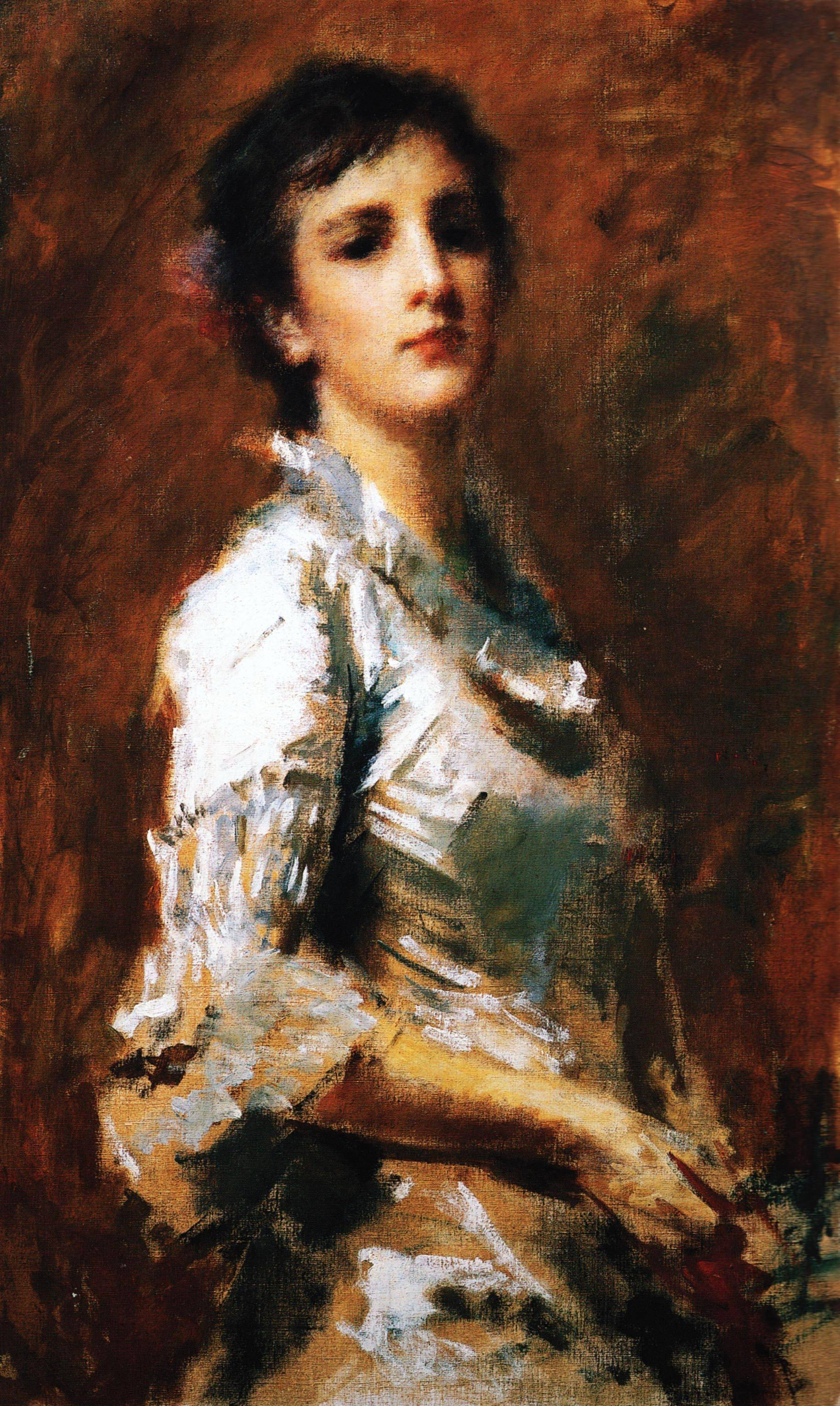
Portrait of Mrs. Luvoni (1880)

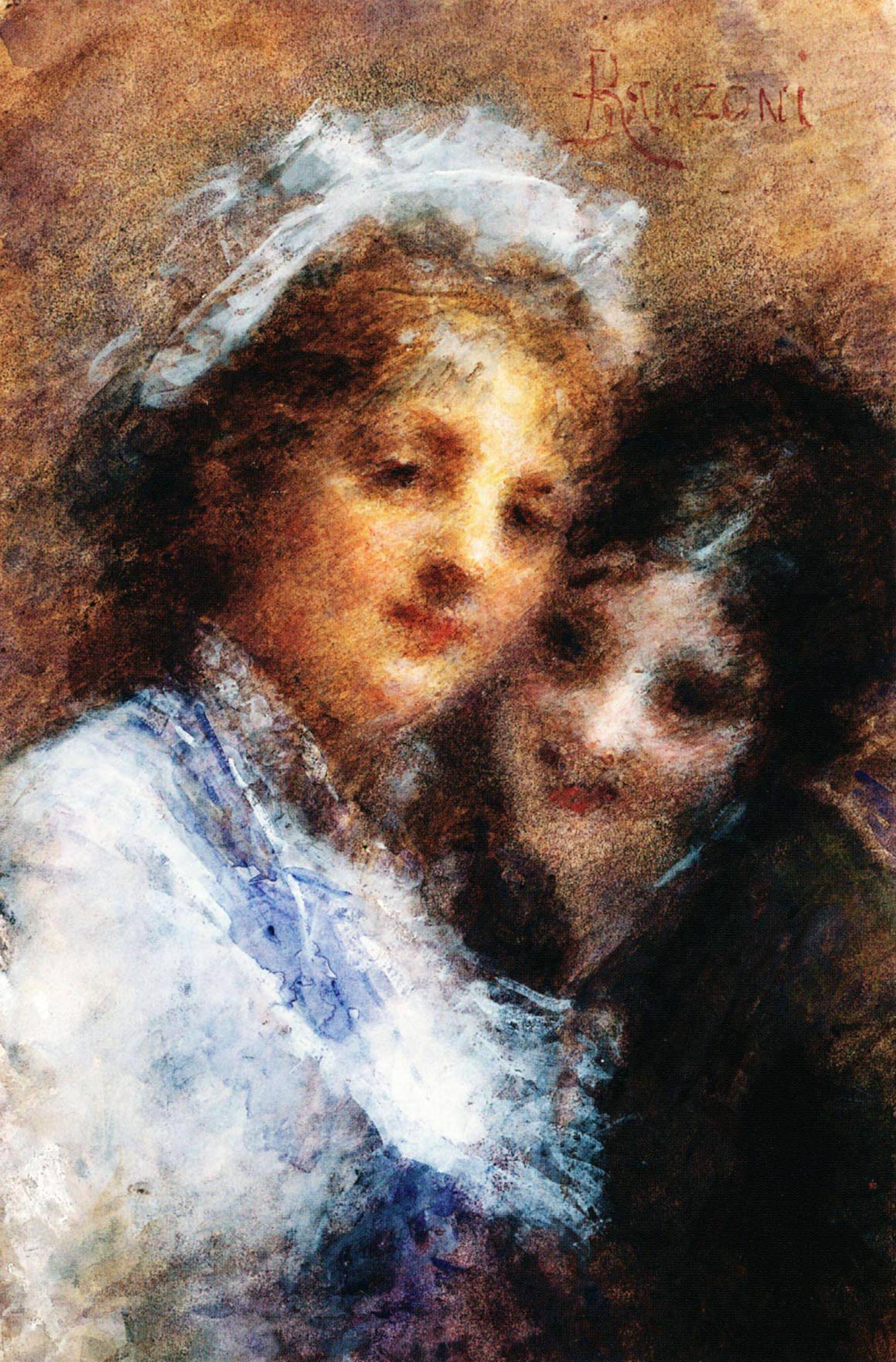
Portrait of the Vercesi sisters (1882)

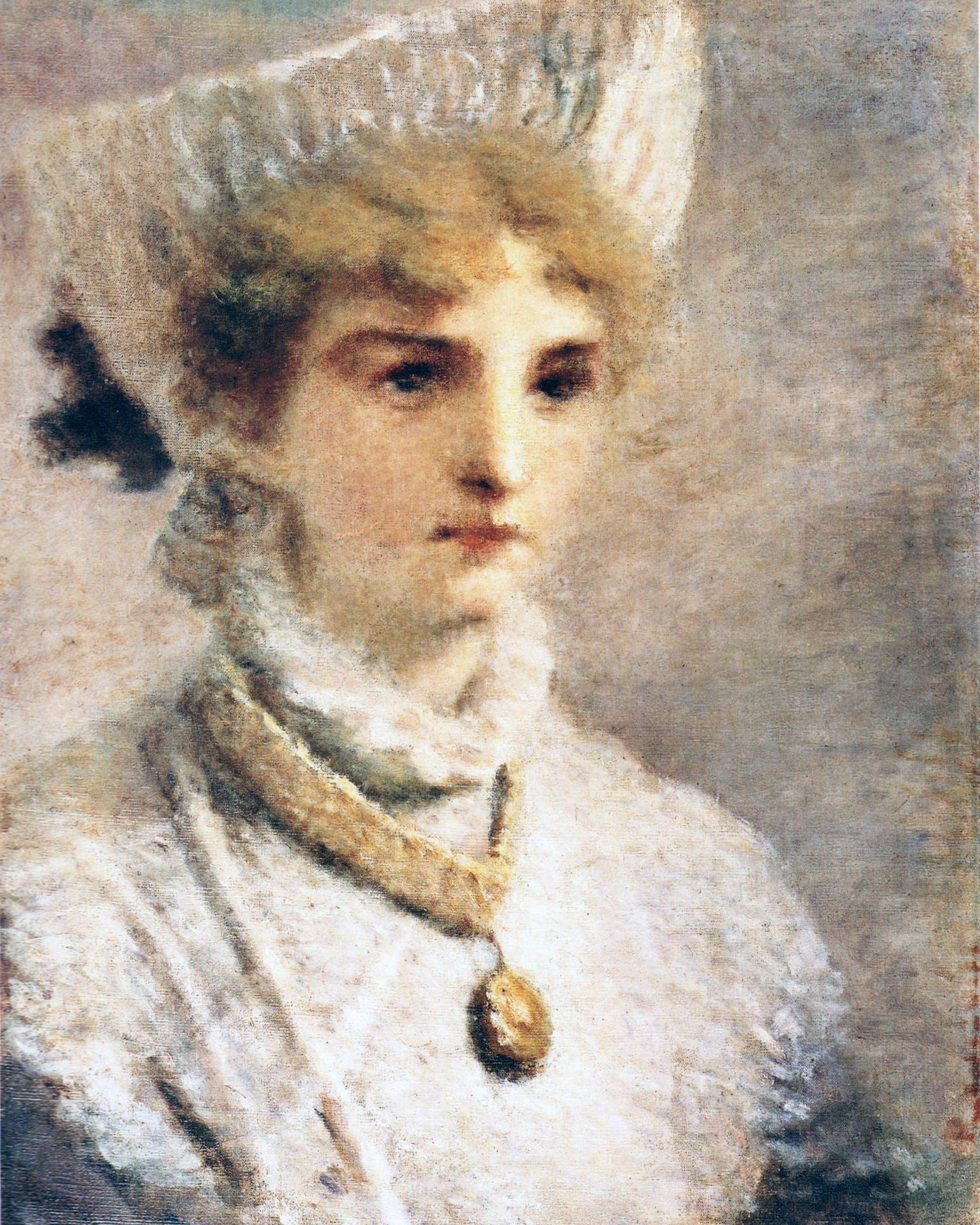
Young girl in white (1885)

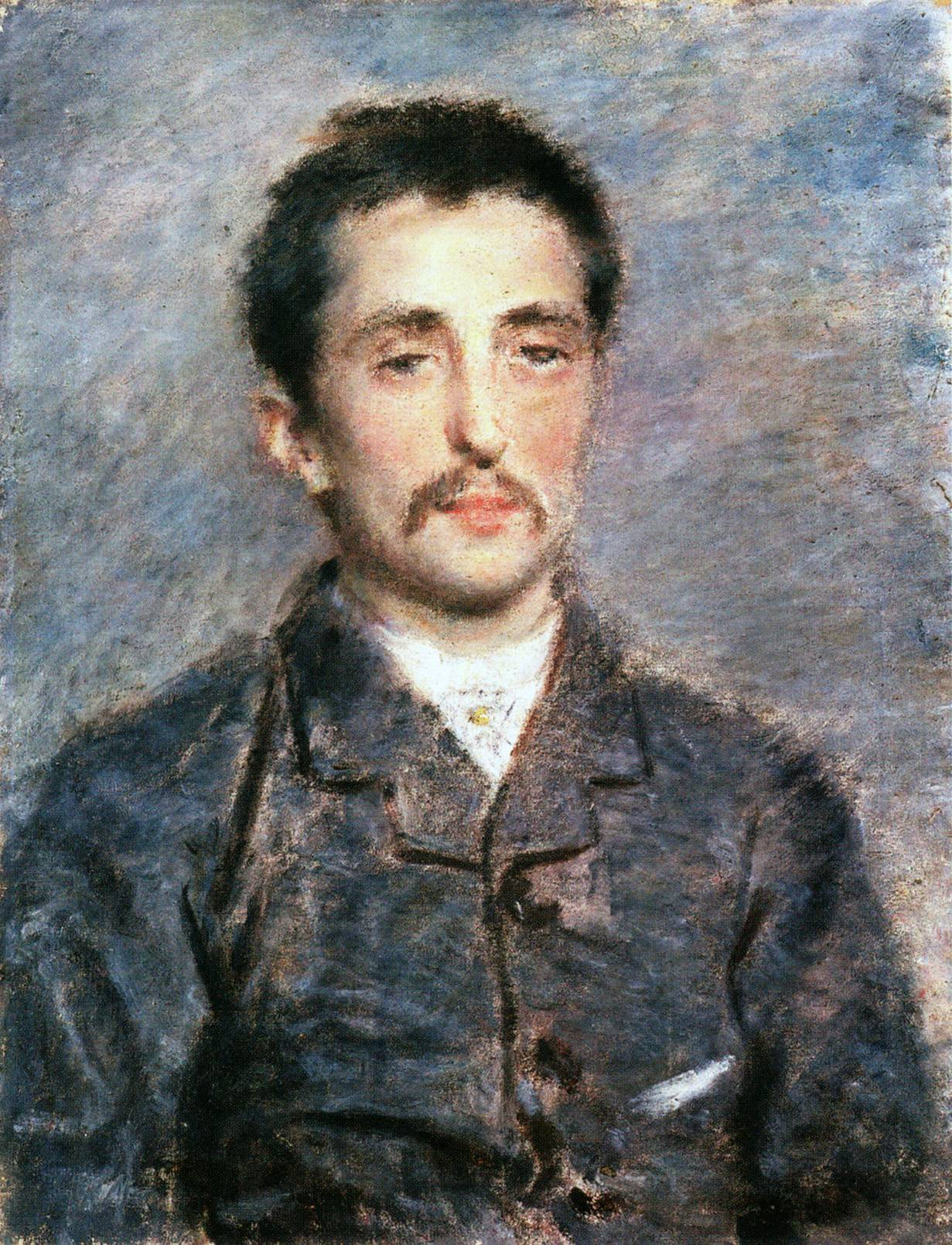
Portrait of Manrico Tonazzi (1889)

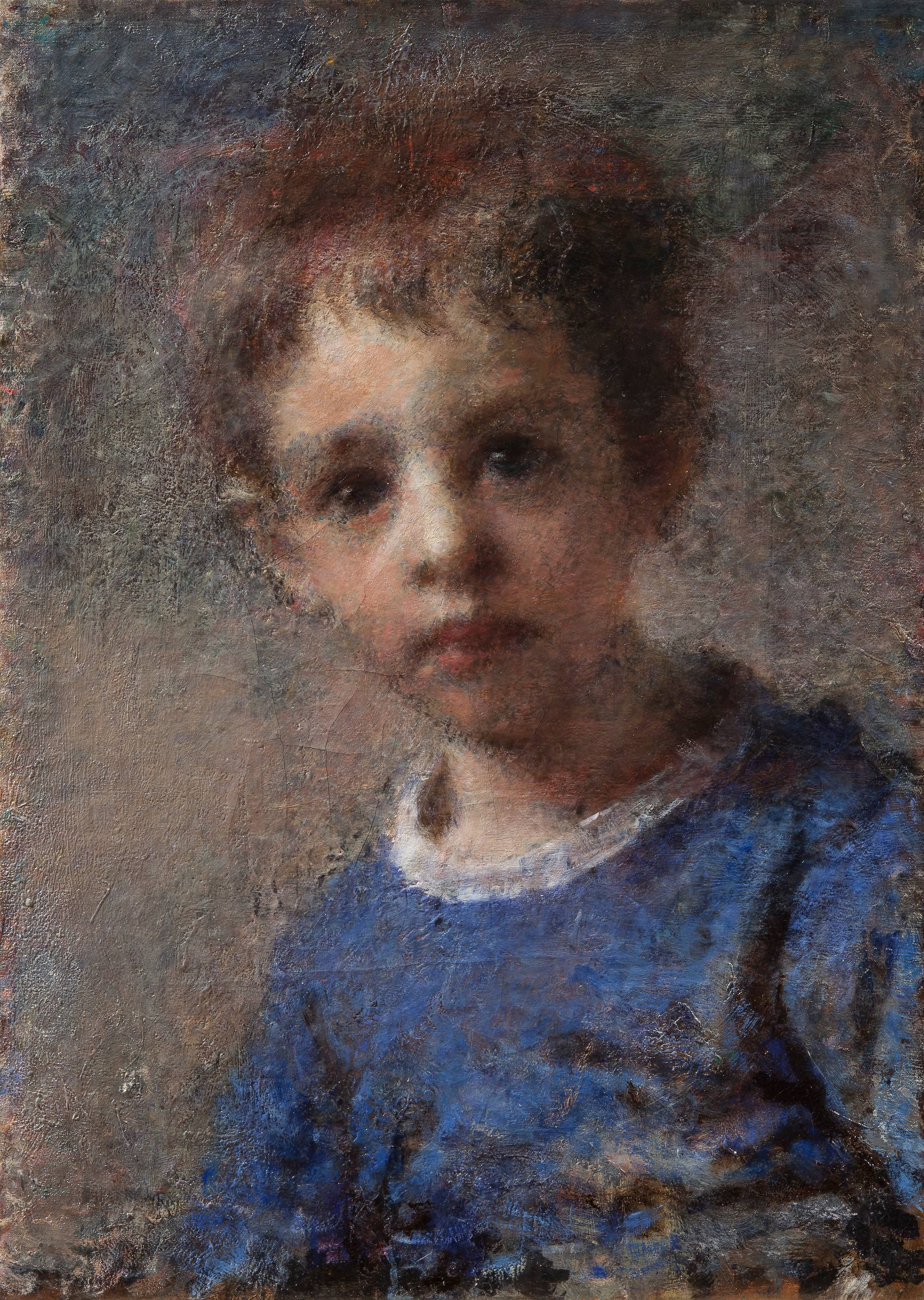
Portrait of the child William Morisetti (1885)

== Sources ==
- Norman, Geraldine (1977). Nineteenth Century Painters and Painting: a Dictionary. University of California Press, Berkeley and Los Angeles. p. 175. ISBN 0-520-03328-0.
- Annie-Paule Quinsac, Daniele Ranzoni. Catalogo ragionato dei dipinti e dei disegni, Skira, Milano 1997.
- http://danieleranzoni.it/ Italian and English versions

== Bibliography ==
- Carlo Carrà. Daniele Ranzoni. Roma, 1924
- Severino Pagani. La pittura lombarda della Scapigliatura. Milano 1955
- Margherita Sarfatti. Daniele Ranzoni. Reale Accademia d'Italia, Roma, 1935
- Renzo Boccardi, Giovani Borellli, Vittore Grubicy, Luigi Conconi, Raffaele Giolli, Daniele Ranzoni. Ottanta riproduzioni delle sue migliori opere, Alfieri & Lacroix, Milano 1911
- Ugo Ojetti. Ritratti d'artisti italiani: Daniele Ranzoni. Treves, Milano, 1931
- Annie-Paule Quinsac (Editor)Catalogo della Mostra Daniele Ranzoni 1843-1889, Centenario della morte, presso il Palazzo della Permanente, Milano, Mazzotta Editore, 1989.
- Piera Imbrico, Daniele Ranzoni (Intra1843-1889), Intra Alberti Editore Libraio 1989
- Annie-Paule Quinsac, Daniele Ranzoni. Catalogo ragionato dei dipinti e dei disegni, Skira, Milano 1997.
- Annie-Paule Quinsac (Editor) Scapigliatura, Catalogue of the Exhibition held in Milan, at Palazzo Reale, Scapigliatura, June–November 2009, Venice, Marsillio Editore, 2009.
- Annie-Paule Quinsac (Editor), Ranzoni. Lo scapigliato maudit, Catalogue of the Milan Exhibition held at Gallerie Maspes, March–June 2017 Grafica Antiga, Milan 2017.
