= Giambattista Bonis =

Italian footballer

Personal information
- Date of birth: 27 June 1926
- Place of birth: Intra, Verbania, Italy

Senior career*
Years	Team	Apps	(Gls)
1945–1946	Verbania Sportiva		(19)
1946–1947	Inter Milan	1	(0)
1947–1948	Spezia	2	(0)
- * Club domestic league appearances and goals

Giambattista Bonis (born 27 June 1926) is an Italian former professional footballer who played as a striker.

== Career ==
Bonis played one game for Inter Milan in the 1946–47 Serie A, in a 1–0 win against Lazio.

== Bibliography ==
- Tipaldi, Enzo (1999). 50 anni di storia del Verbania Calcio 1945-1995 Da Galimberti a Pedretti (1 ed.).
