= Intra, Italy =

Intra
- Frazione
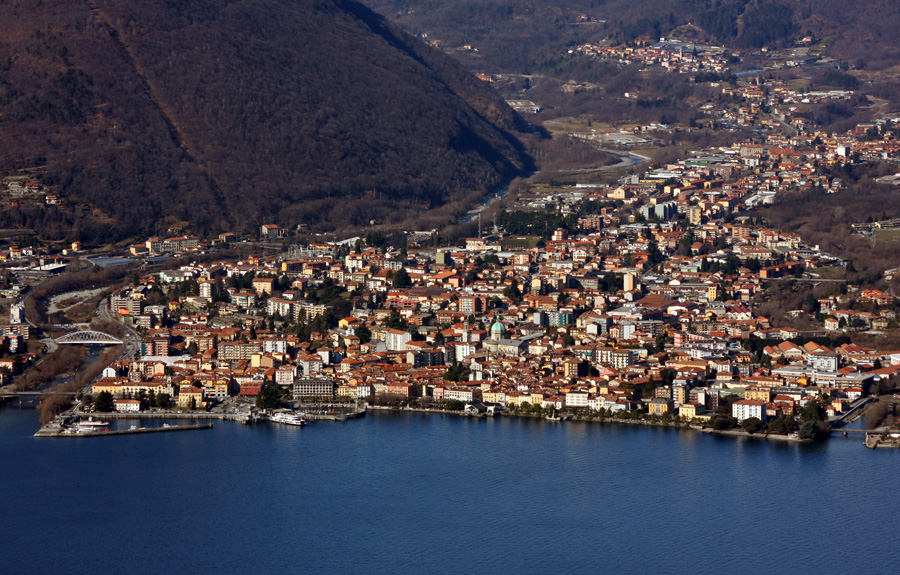

- Location of Intra in Italy
- Country: Italy
- Region: Piedmont
- Province: Verbano-Cusio-Ossola (VB)
- Comune: Verbania
- Time zone: UTC+1 (CET)
  - Summer (DST): UTC+2 (CEST)

Intra is a frazione of the municipality of Verbania, in Piedmont, northern Italy, located in a small alluvial plain. It is important for its port on Lake Maggiore and attendant tourism. In Intra in 1905 was founded Zust, an Italian car manufacturing company, by engineer Roberto Züst, an Italian industrialist of Swiss origin, In 1909 was founded a rowing club, Canottieri Intra. The main church is a basilica dedicated to San Vittore. The basilica di San Vittore was rebuilt during the first decade of the eighteenth century.

== History ==
Intra's area has been inhabited since prehistoric times. The oldest known population living in the area were the Lepontii., then it was added to the Roman Empire by Emperor Augustus in the first century AD. During Middle Age was under the control of Conti di Biandrate, after the comune of Novara and then Duchy of Milan. Intra was an autonomous comune, in 1927 were merged to it Arizzano Inferiore, Trobaso and Zoverallo, in 1929 Unchio, then in 1939 Intra itself was merged with Pallanza to form Verbania under the royal decree n. 702 of 4 April 1939.

== Notable people ==
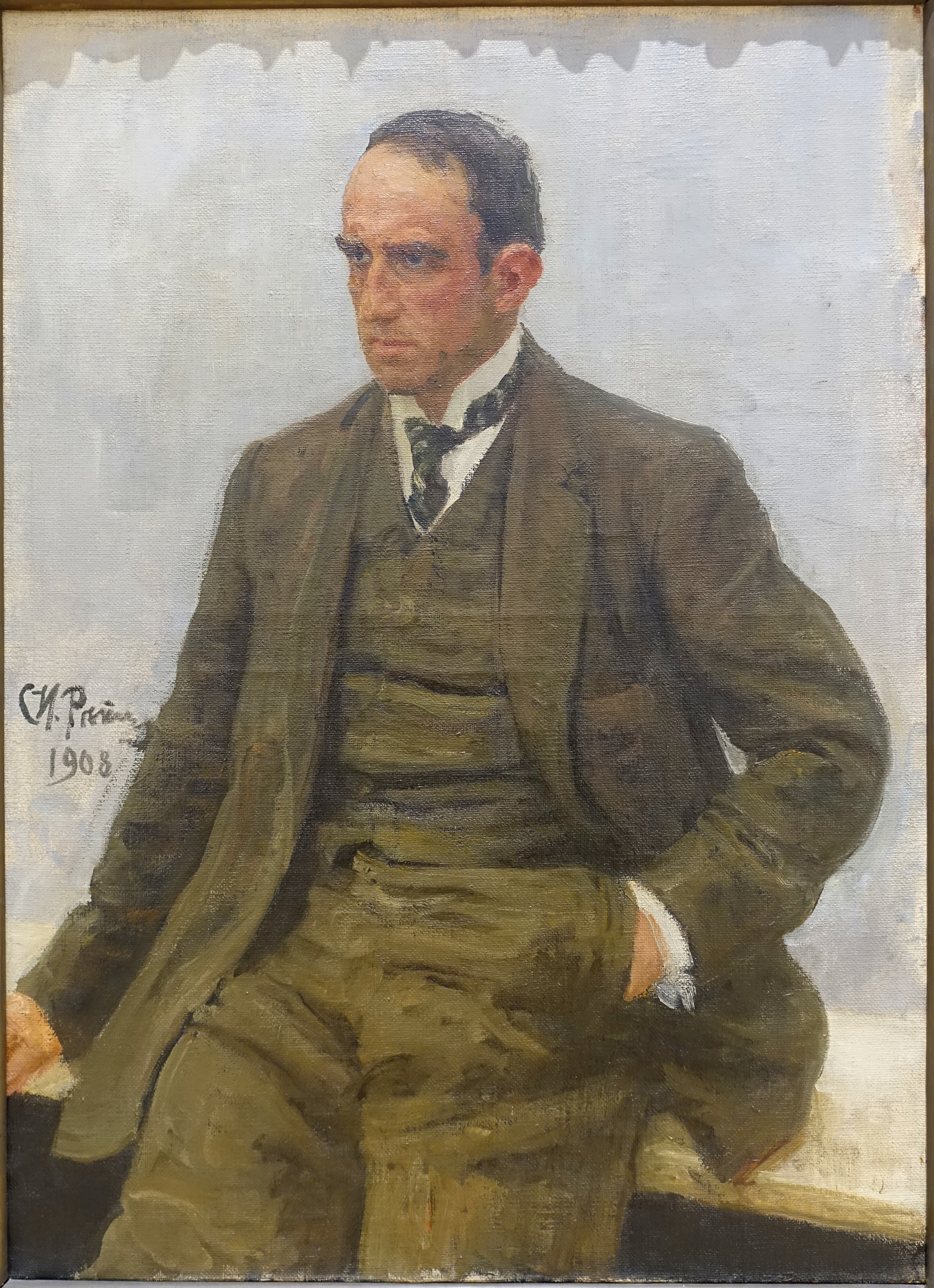
Paolo Troubetzkoy, 1908

- Giorgio Andreoli (c. 1465 – 1553), an important potter in the Italian Renaissance.
- Luigi Capello (1859–1941, an Italian general, fought in the Italo-Turkish War (1911–12) and World War I.
- Daniele Ranzoni (1843–1889), an Italian portrait painter
- Guido Sutermeister (1883-1964), an Italian engineer and archaeologist.
- Paolo Troubetzkoy (1866—1938), an Italian impressionist sculptor of Russian origin

=== Sport ===
- Sergio Bello (born 1942), an Italian former sprinter
- Giambattista Bonis (born 1926), an Italian former football striker.
- Paolo Carraro (born 1964), an Italian former sprint canoeist

== Gallery ==
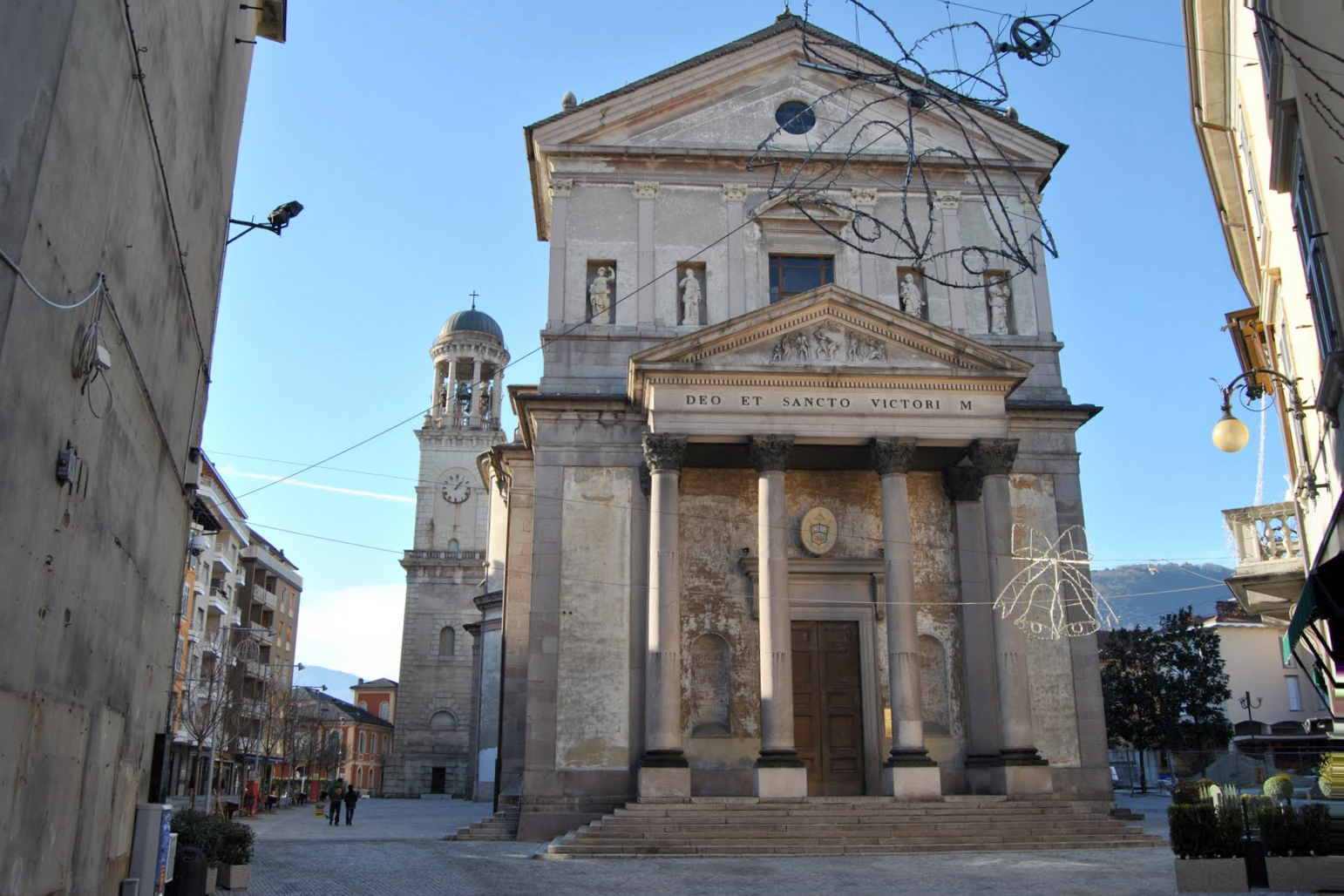
The main church, San Vittore

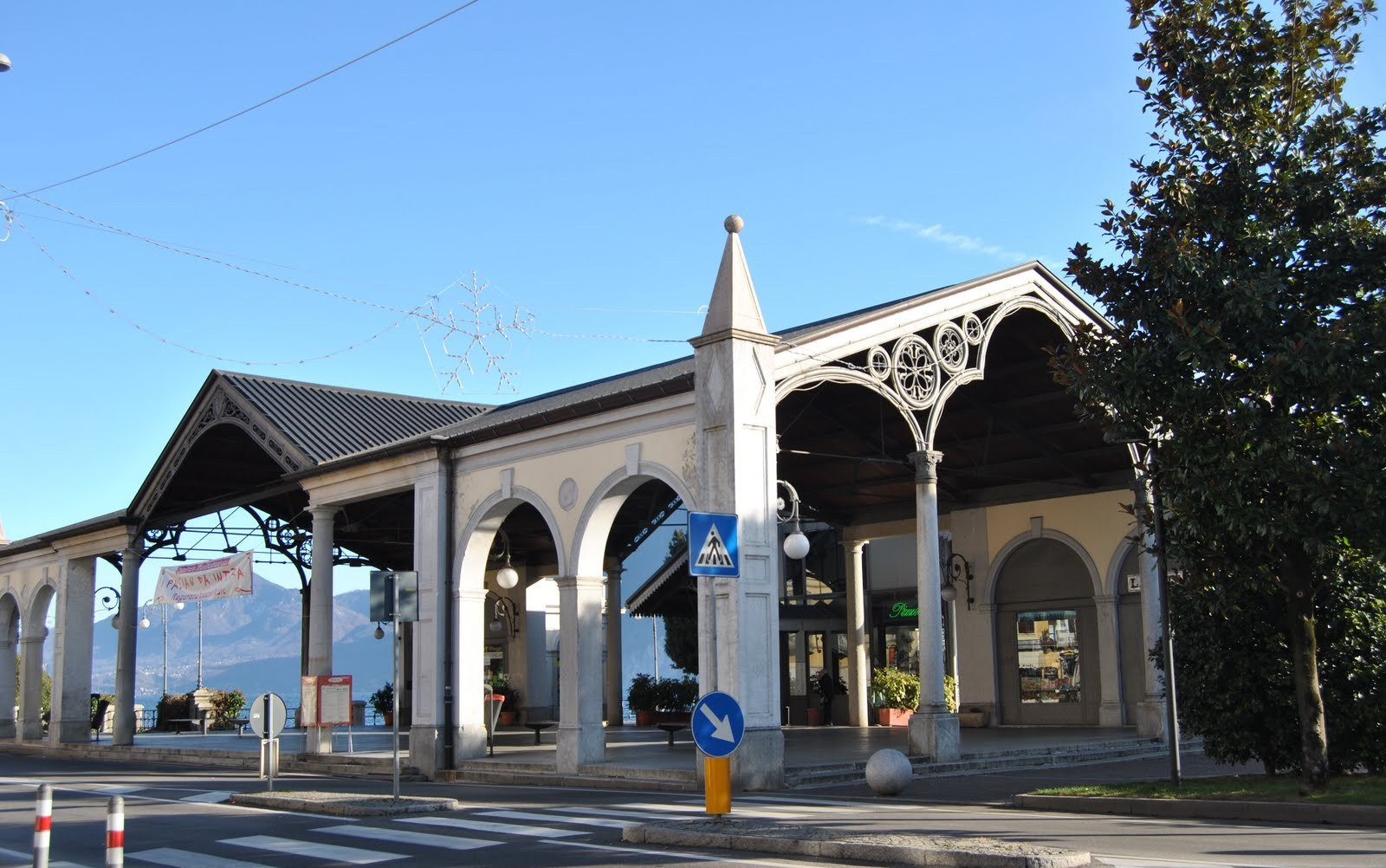
Vecchio Imbarcadero Liberty

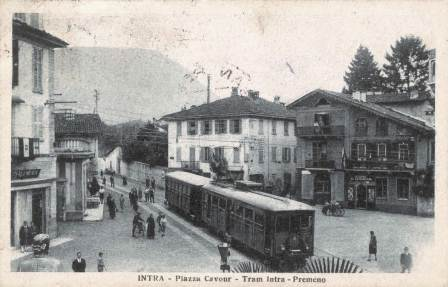
Old tramway station
