= Luigi Luvoni =

Italian engineer and painter

Luigi Luvoni (1859–1904) was an Italian engineer and painter.

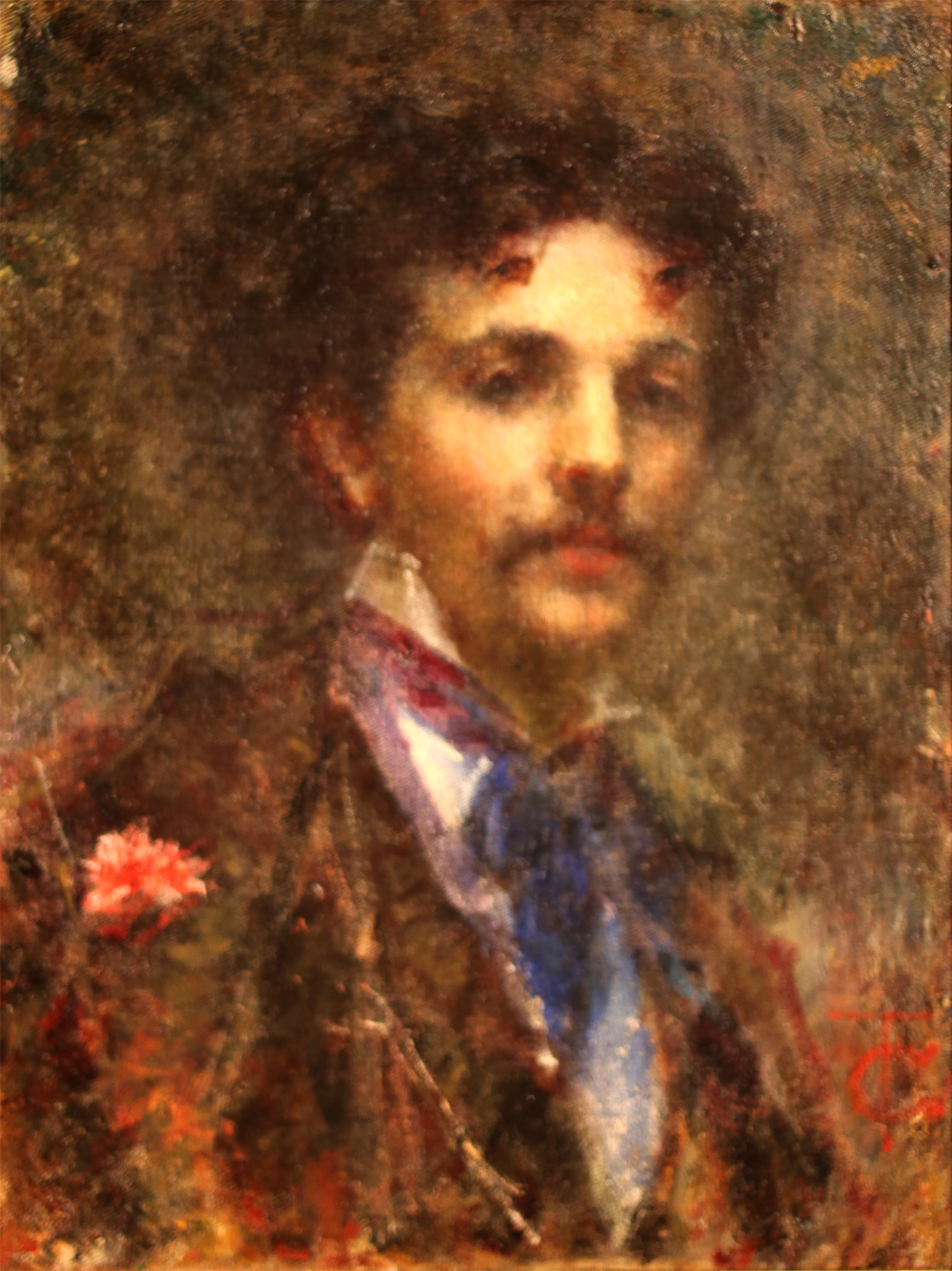
Portrait of Luigi Luvoni (1872) by Tranquillo Cremona, at GAM, Milan

== Biography ==
Luvoni was born in Lombardy, Italy in 1859.

He married Giuseppina Lorioli (1846, Milan - 1900, Stresa).

Architect Luigi Boffi designed a house for him, Villa Teresita, in 1888. The house was built in Stresa, Italy and Luvoni and his family moved in in 1890.

He exhibited his work in 1883 at Milan: Lasciami pregar vivo l'angelo che pinto amai (inspired by the Cantico dei Cantici by Felice Cavallotti), Due amici, Facciamo la pace, and Fiori del' convento.

In 1883, at Rome, he exhibited: Garibaldi; Portrait of bambina, and Lungo il naviglio;

In 1884, at Turin, he exhibited: Allo studio, Al lavoro, and Un dominò rosa.

In 1886 at Milan, he displayed: I nostri bisnonni; Diana e Tom; and Bagnanti.

His wife, Giuseppina Lorioli, was the subject of a painting by Daniele Ranzoni.

Luigi's portrait by Tranquillo Cremona is on display at the GAM of Milan.

Luvoni collected artworks and his collection was endowed to city of Milan in 1900.
