= Pacifico Buzio =

Italian painter

Pacifico Buzio (1843–1902) was an Italian painter, mainly of portraits, but also of illuminated manuscripts.

He was born in Pavia and trained at the Scuola Civica of Painting in Pavia under Ezechiele Acerbi and Giacomo Trécourt He is said to have lived in bohemian and impoverished circumstances. Some of his paintings can be seen in the Cimitero Monumentale of Pavia. In 1864, his painting depicting a scene from Donizetti's opera, where Imelda de' Lambertazzi is next to the corpse of her lover (Museo Civico, Pavia) won the local Frank prize.
