= Giacomo Trécourt =

Italian painter (1812–1882)

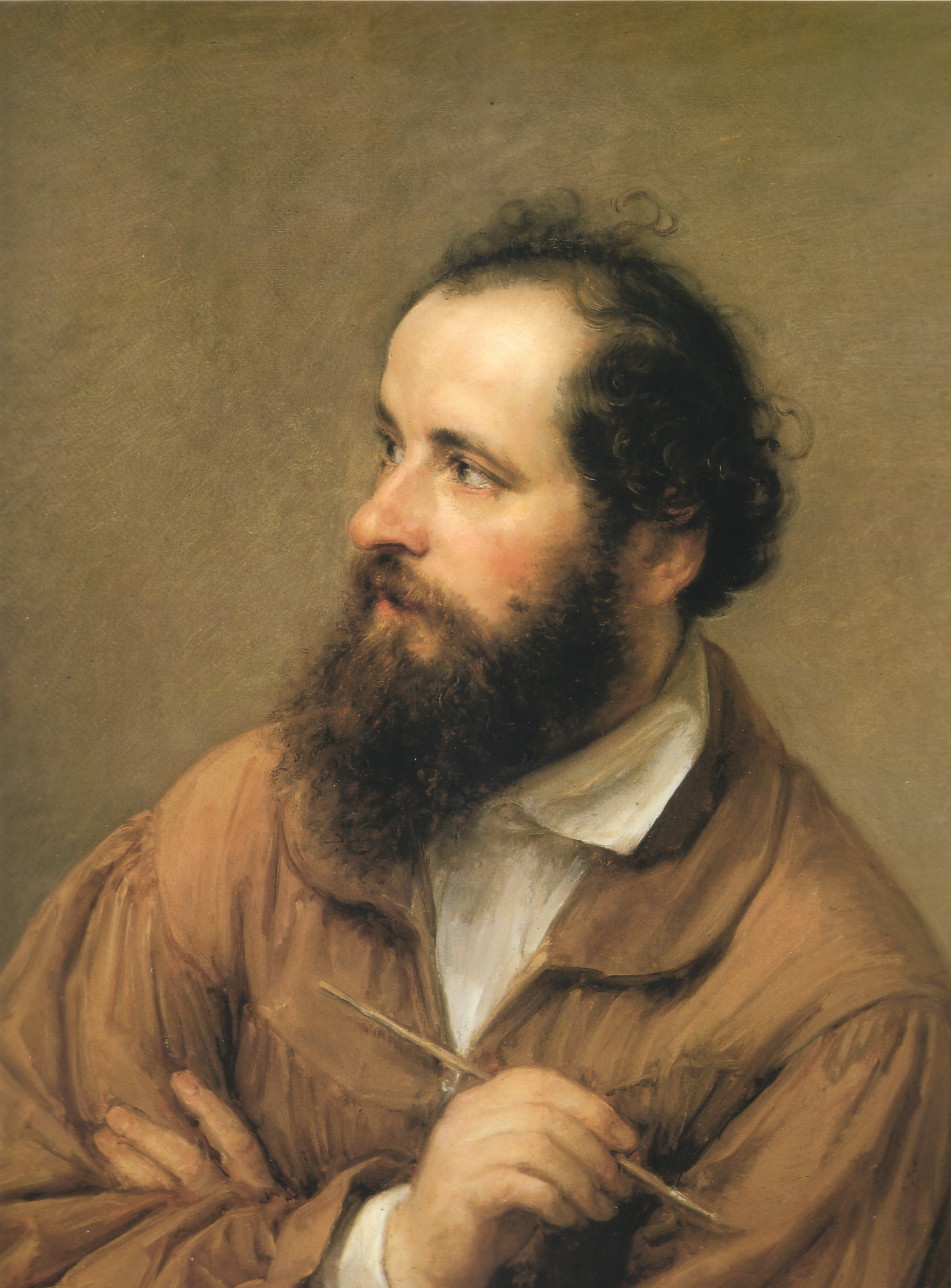
Giacomo Trécourt; portrait by Giovanni Carnovali.

Giacomo Trécourt (1812 – 1882) was an Italian painter.

== Biography ==
He was born in Bergamo, and died in Pavia. He was a pupil of Giuseppe Diotti at the Accademia Carrara in Bergamo. In 1842, he was nominated director of the School of Painting in Pavia, where he remained. He painted altarpieces for the churches of Zanica, Urgnano, and Villongo. He painted an equestrian portrait of King Vittorio Emanuele, conserved in the University of Pavia. His brother Francesco Trecourt was also a painter. Among his pupils was Pacifico Buzio.
