= Mariani (surname) =

Family name

Mariani is an Italian surname. Notable people with the surname include:

- Amos Mariani (1931–2007), Italian professional football player and coach
- Angelo Mariani (chemist), French chemist
- Angelo Mariani (conductor) (1821–1873), Italian conductor and composer
- Antonio Mariani (17th century), Italian luthier
- Camillo Mariani (1565–1611), Italian sculptor
- Carlo Maria Mariani (1931–2021), Italian painter
- Carlos Mariani (born 1957), Minnesota politician and Representative
- Carolina Mariani (born 1972), Argentine retired female judoka
- Cesare Mariani (1826–1901), Italian painter
- Davide Mariani (born 1991), Swiss footballer of Italian and Mexican descent
- Domenico Mariani (1863–1939), Roman Catholic Church Cardinal
- Edoardo Mariani (1893–1957), Italian footballer
- Enrico Mariani, Italian rower
- Enus Mariani (born 1998), Italian gymnast
- Felice Mariani (footballer) (1918–1997), Italian professional football player
- Felice Mariani (judoka) (born 1954), Italian former judoka
- Gindetta Mariani (1870–1950), Italian mycologist
- Giorgio Mariani (1946–2011), Italian professional footballer
- Giovanni Maria Mariani, Italian Baroque artist
- Giuseppe Mariani (doctor) (1885–1963), Italian doctor and medical researcher
- Giuseppe Mariani (art director) (fl. 1952–1992), Italian art director
- Gregorio Mariani (1833–1902), Italian painter
- Joseph Mariani, French researcher in Computer Science
- Lorenzo Mariani, American stage director of opera
- Luciano Mariani (1801–1859), Italian operatic bass
- Luiza Mariani (born 1980), Brazilian actress and producer
- Marc Mariani (born 1987), American football player
- Marcella Mariani (1936–1955), Italian actress and winner of the 1953 Miss Italy edition
- Marco Mariani (curler) (born 1968), Italian curler
- Marco Mariani (footballer) (born 1992), Italian professional footballer
- Mario Mariani (born 1970), Italian pianist, composer, and performer
- Maurilio Mariani (born 1973), Italian athlete
- Mimi Mariani (1928–1971), Indonesian actress, model, and singer
- Orazio Mariani (1915–1981), Italian athlete
- Paul Mariani (born 1940), American biographer and poet
- Philippe Mariani, CEO of Genesis Investment Company (B.S.C.)
- Piero Mariani (footballer) (1911–1990), Italian professional football player
- Pompeo Mariani (1857–1927), Italian painter
- Robert D. Mariani (born 1950), American lawyer and a U.S. District Judge
- Rosa Mariani (1799–1864), Italian coloratura contralto opera singer
- Simone Mariani (born 1964), Italian-American actor, writer, director and producer
- Siti Mariam binti Ismail (1933–2015), Malaysian-Singaporean Malay actress, singer and model
- Teodoro Mariani (1882–1916), Italian rower
- Thierry Mariani (born 1958), French politician
- Tommaso Mariani (flourished 1728–1739), Italian librettist
- Virginia Mariani Campolieti (1869–1941), alian pianist, orchestra conductor and composer
- Virginia Mariani (1824–1898), Italian painter, active in Rome

== See also ==
- Mariani (disambiguation)
