= Pende =

Pende may refer to:

- Pendé a town in France
- The Pende people, an ethnic group in Congo
- Pendé River, river in Africa
- Nicola Pende (1880–1970), Italian endocrinologist
