= Piero Mariani =

Piero Mariani may refer to:

- Piero Mariani (footballer) (1911 - ?), Italian footballer with Inter Milan and Novara in the 1930s
- Piero Mariani (musician), American rock musician associated with the band Little Feat
