= Francesco Bosso =

Francesco Bosso (born Vercelli, December 27, 1864; died Turin, 1933) was an Italian scenic designer and painter, best known for landscapes and floral still lifes. His daughter Maria was the mother of artist and designer Roberto Sambonet (1924–1995).

== Education and career ==
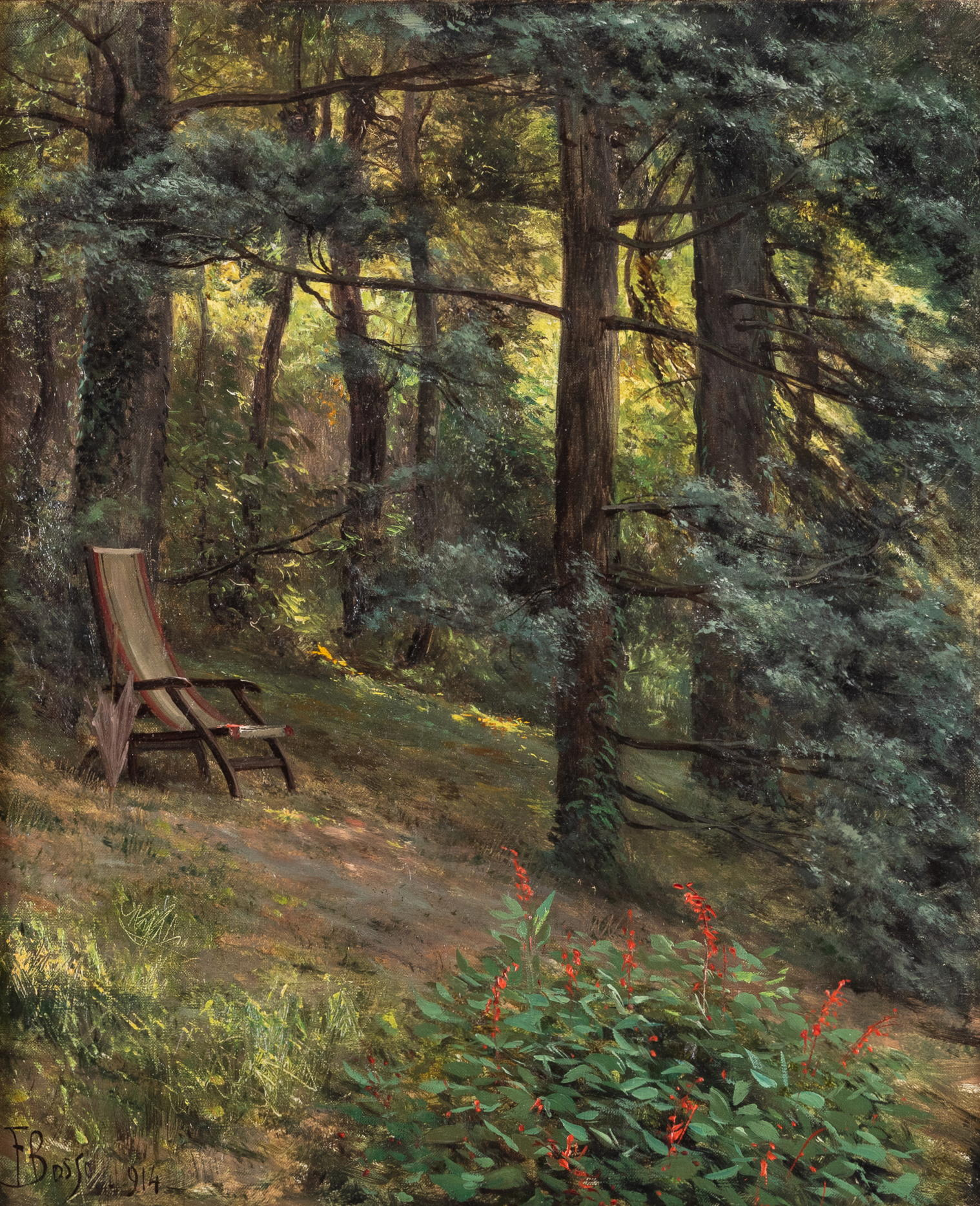
The woods at Villa Cavallini, Lucca, 1914.

Bosso studied at the Istituto di Belle Arti in Vercelli under Andre Bonino and Carlo Costa (1826–1897). At the beginning of his artistic career he dedicated himself to decoration and scenography, carrying out works in palaces, churches and theaters in Italy, France and Switzerland.

In 1914, at the International Exhibition of Marine and Maritime Hygiene, a world's fair held in Genoa, his large diorama of the Panama Canal received high praise. At this time, he appears to have enjoyed the friendship or patronage of the Piedmontese Cavallini family, as suggested by his painting dated 1914 of a lawn chair and parasol nestled in the woods at their villa in Lucca (now Agriturismo Villa Cavallini).

In 1922, the Esposizione d’Arte Vercellese Moderna held in Vercelli featured a gallery of 47 of his paintings. A label on a painting dated 1924 give Bosso's studio address in Turin as Via Riberi no. 2.

He had great success with decorative floral still lifes, typically presented in elaborately carved and gilded frames, sometimes circular or oval in shape, and often conceived as paired pendants.

== In museums and collections ==
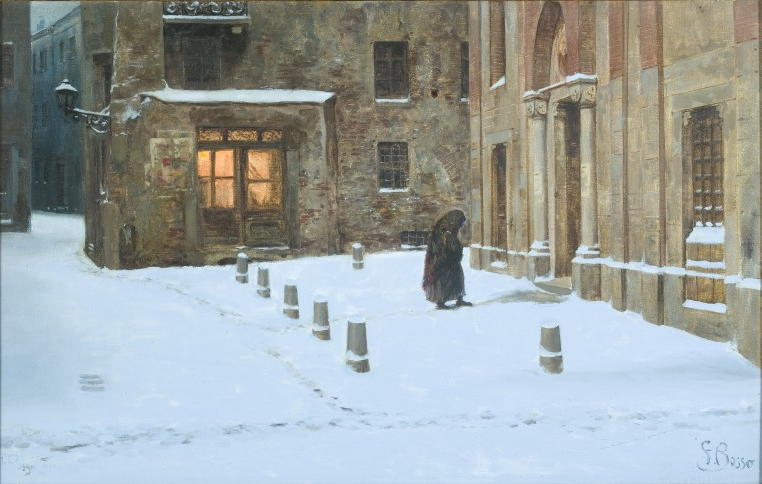
A Matutino, 1920, Galleria d'arte moderna Ricci Oddi.

The Museo del Teatro di Figura in Milan conserves a number of painted stage curtains, backdrops and scenery elements that Bosso designed and created for the city's traditional puppet theaters, beginning in 1900.

His painting A matutino is in the collection of the Galleria d'arte moderna Ricci Oddi in Piacenza.

His works are in the collection of the late composer Angelo Gilardino, who was also born in Vercelli and who wrote of the artist:

Known beyond national borders for his skill as a decorator and painter of rich florilegi of Flemish style, Francesco Bosso...gave his best in landscapes, where—more than any other artist from Vercelli—he absorbed influences from beyond the Alps (especially Courbet) and from Antonio Fontanesi. He achieved very successful results in pastel, creating nuances and transparencies of extreme finesse.

== Floral still lifes ==
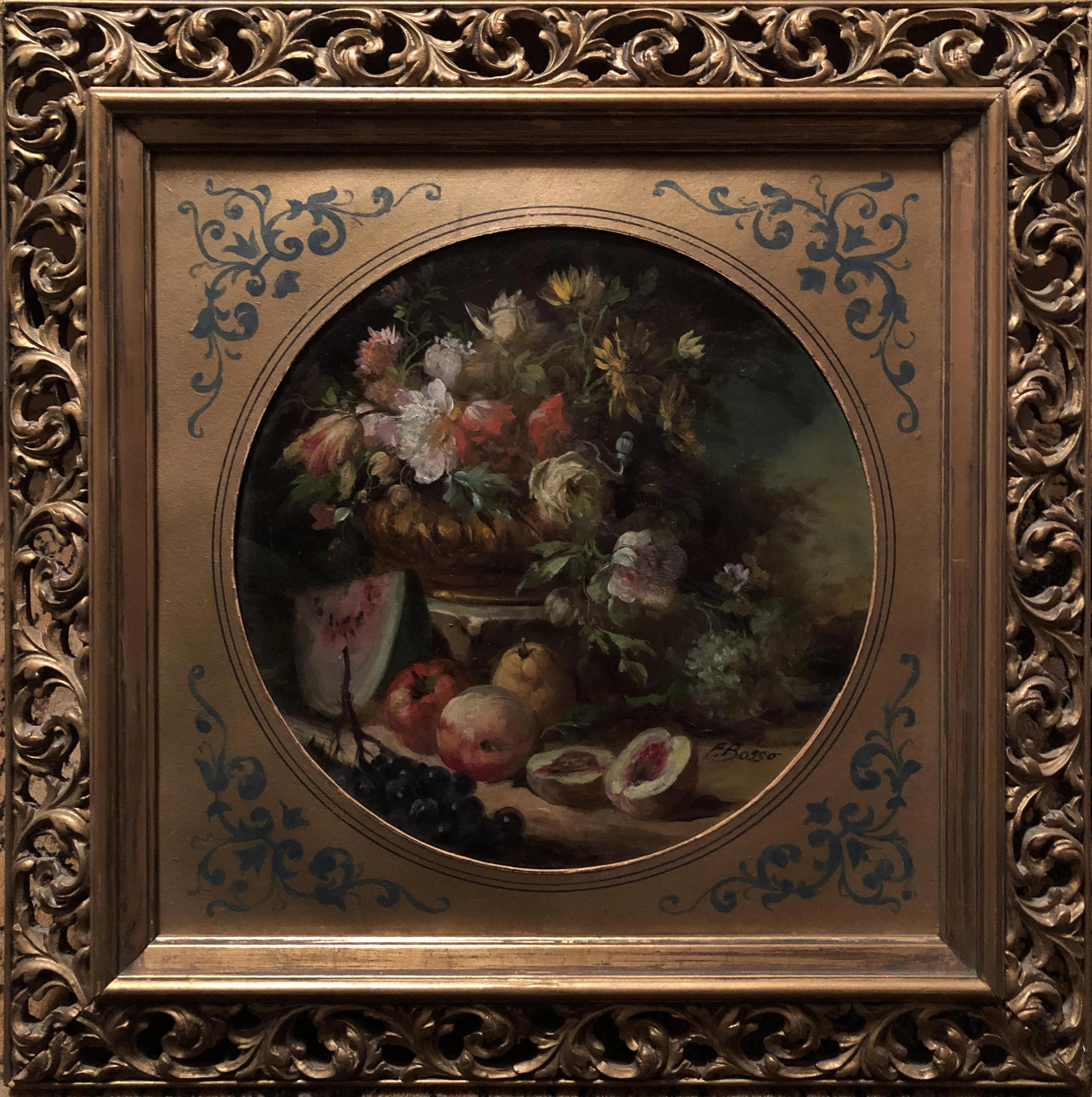
Still life with fruit and flowers (1923 or after; by 1933).

A still life with fruit and flowers painted between 1923 and 1933 displays signature characteristics of the artist's work: it is painted in oil, round in shape, with an elaborately carved and glided frame. Artisanship is evident in each component: the image is painted by hand, the circular matting is hand-cut and hand-painted with green flourishes, and the frame is hand-carved. The materials are common and fragile—the matting is thin, the painting is on cardboard, and the frame is pine—but the presentation registers as lavish and opulent. Bosso was first known as a stage scenery designer, where, as in this still life, what is seen from the back and what the viewer sees are not the same; perceived values come from the workmanship, not the materials.

A written note on backing paper verso, "frutti fiori del Foà", may indicate the work was commissioned or collected by a member of the Jewish Foà family prominent at this time in Vercelli and Turin, where the artist lived and worked. Although the work is undated, newspaper used as backing paper is dated January 17, 1923, indicating the work was created no earlier than that date and no later than 1933, the year Bosso died.

== Gallery: selected works ==
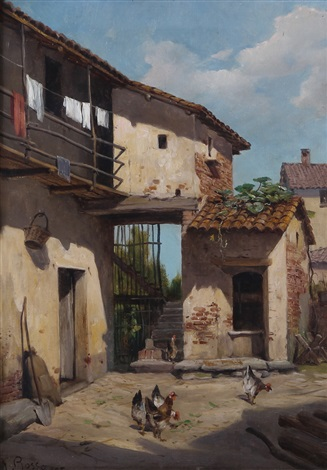
Nel Cortile, 1895.

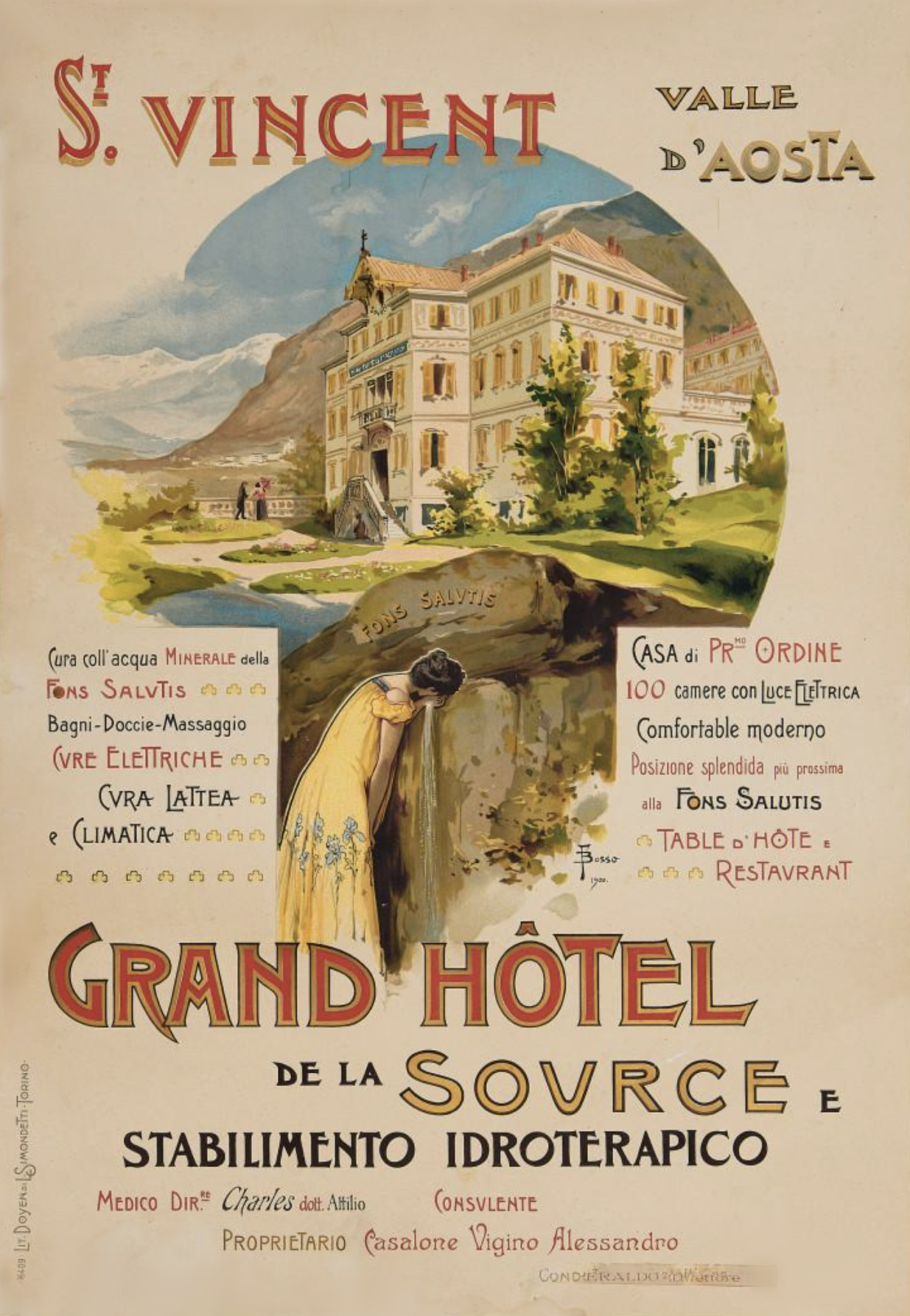
Poster, Aosta Valley spa hotel, 1900.

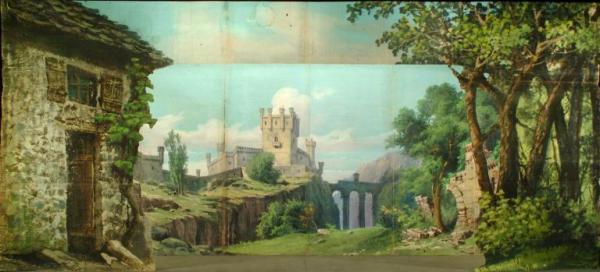
Stage scenery, 1904, Museo del Teatro di Figura, Milan.

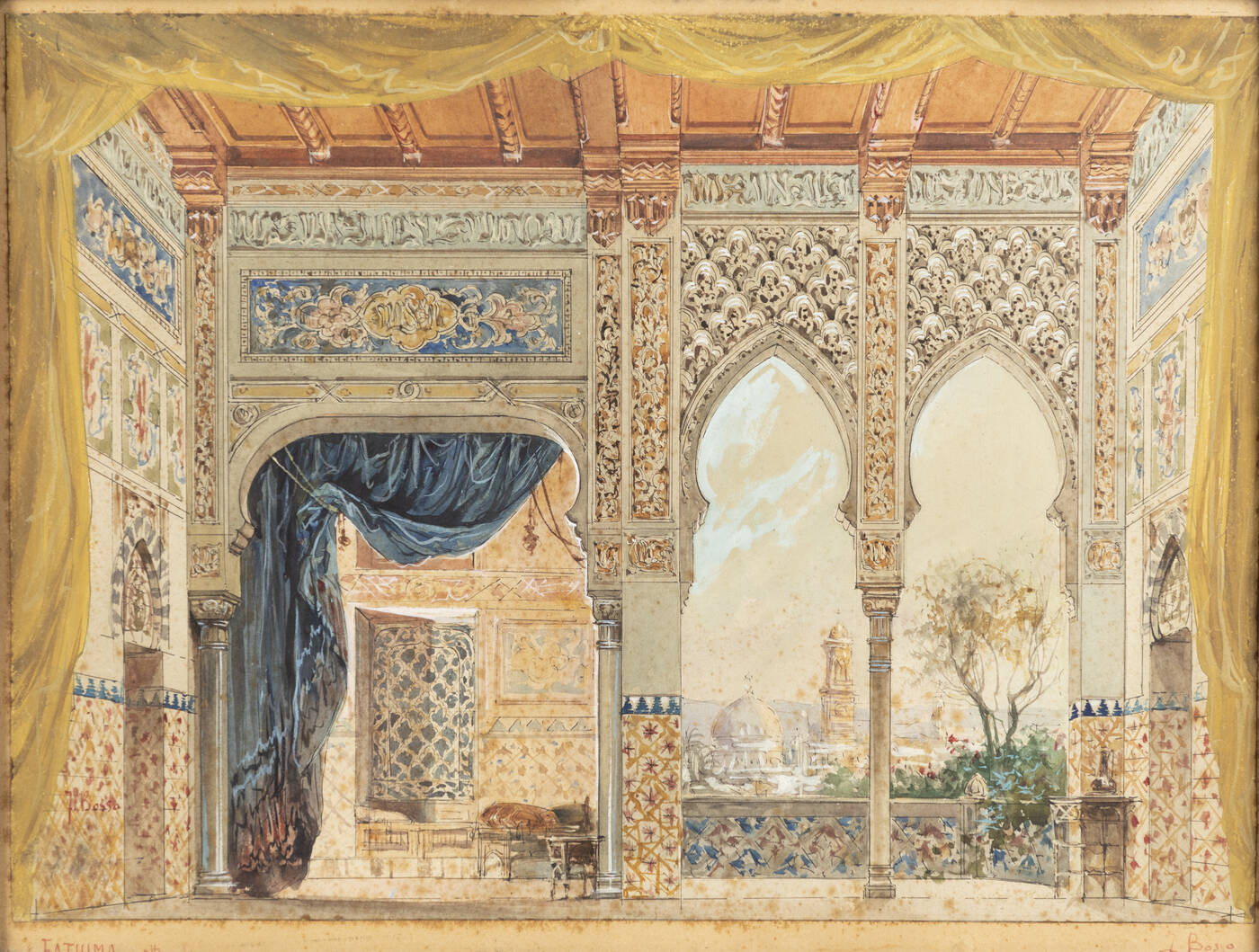
Fathima, Act I (stage design).

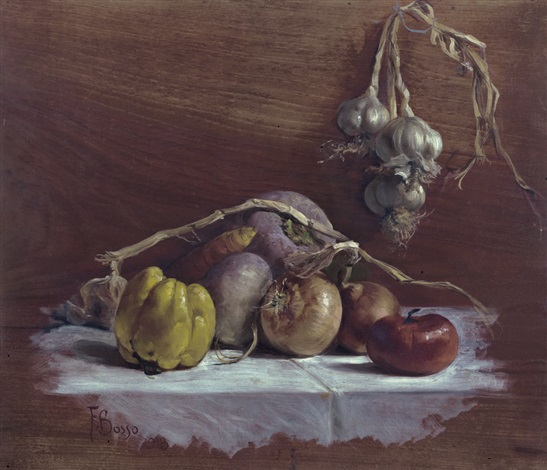
Still life, 1913.

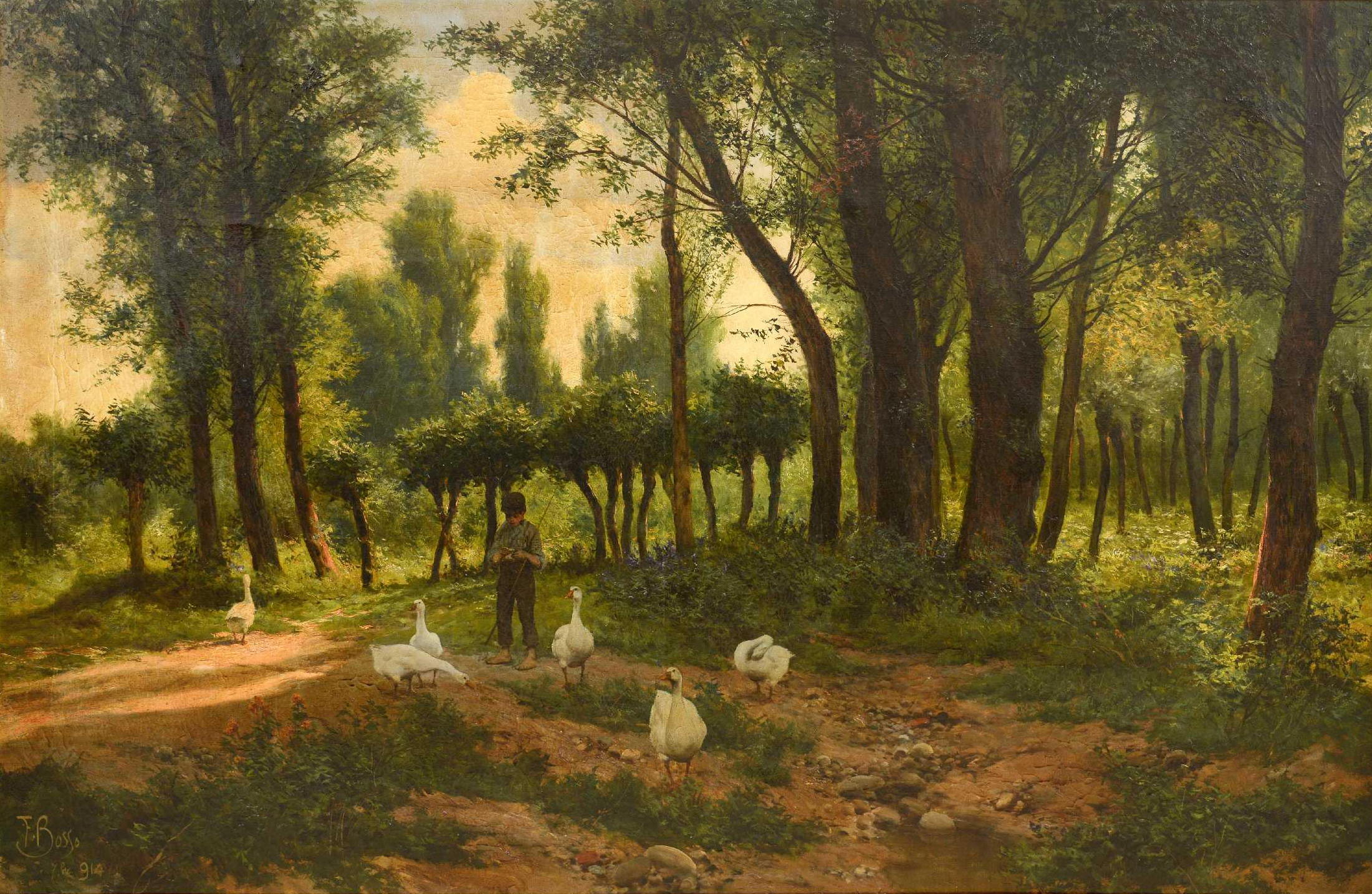
Boy and geese, 1914.

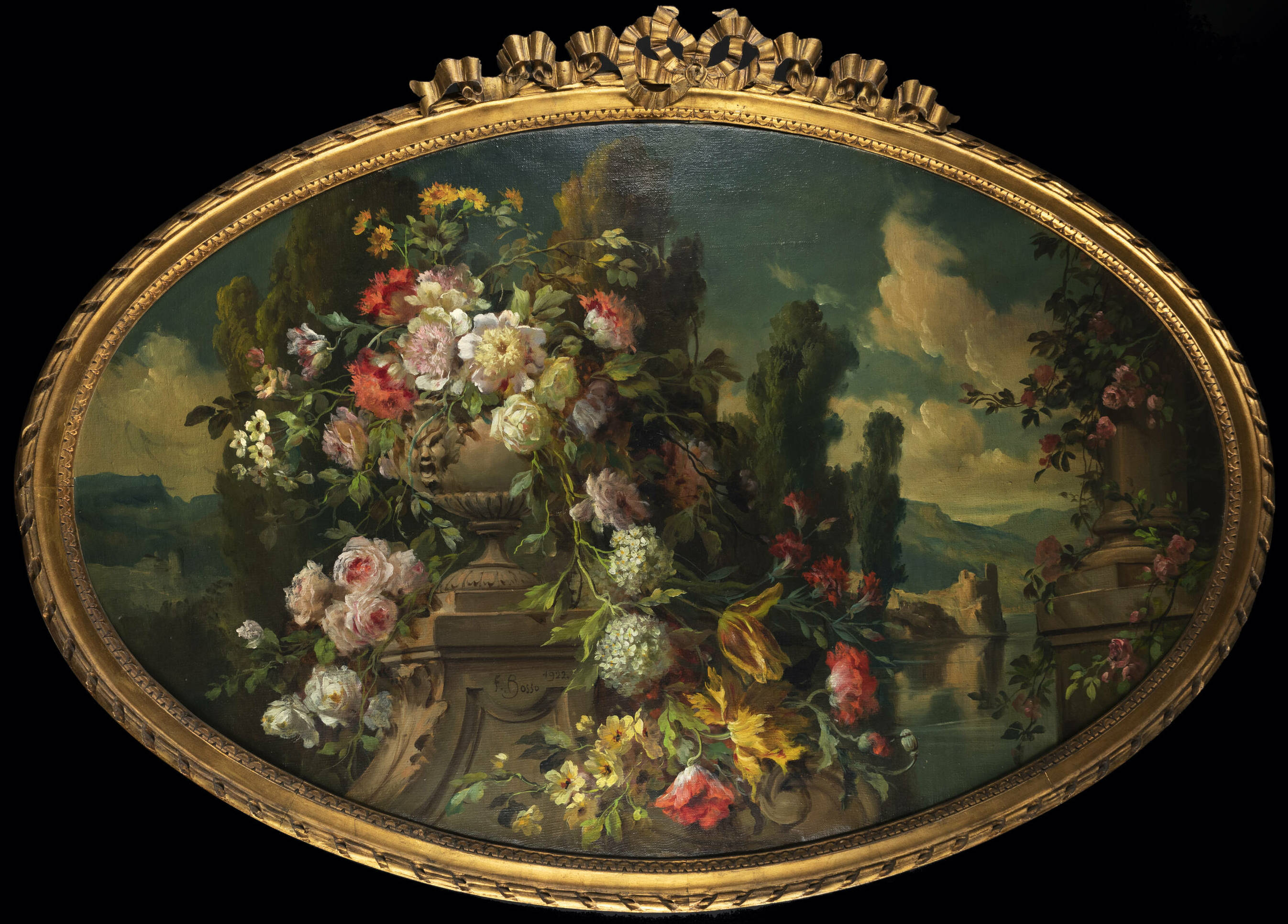
Fiori nel paesaggio, 1922.

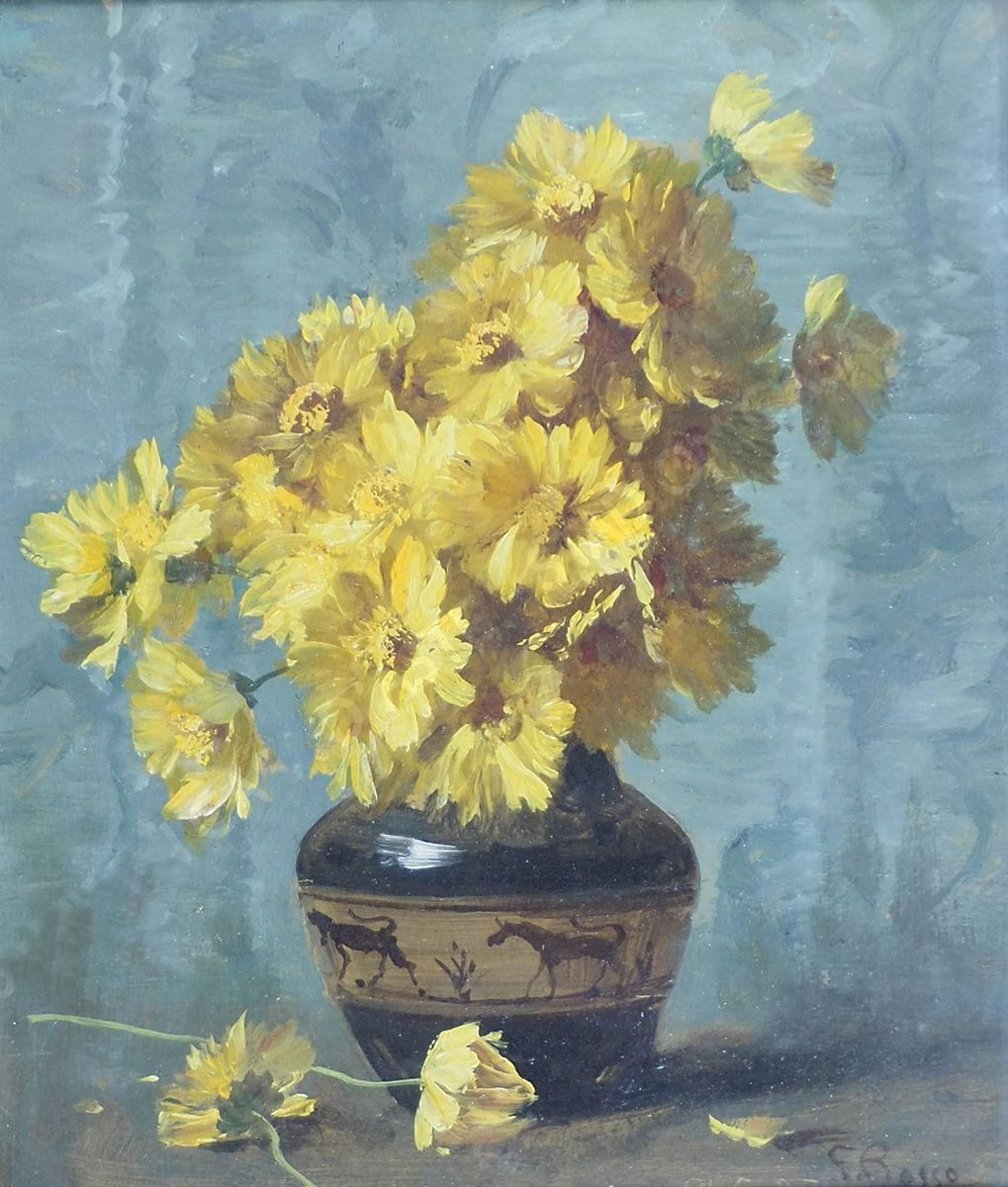
Floral still life, 1925.

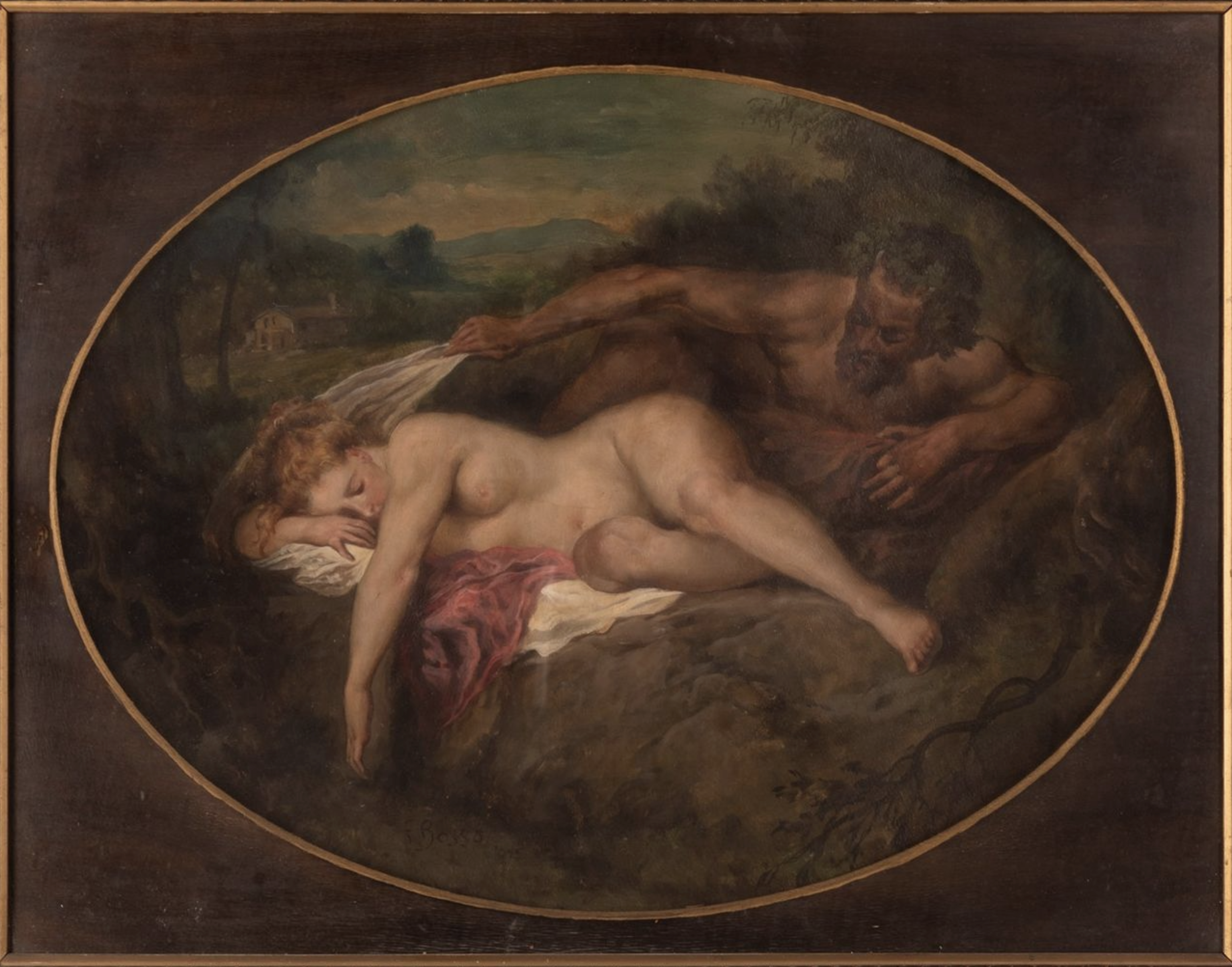
Nude and satyr, 1925.

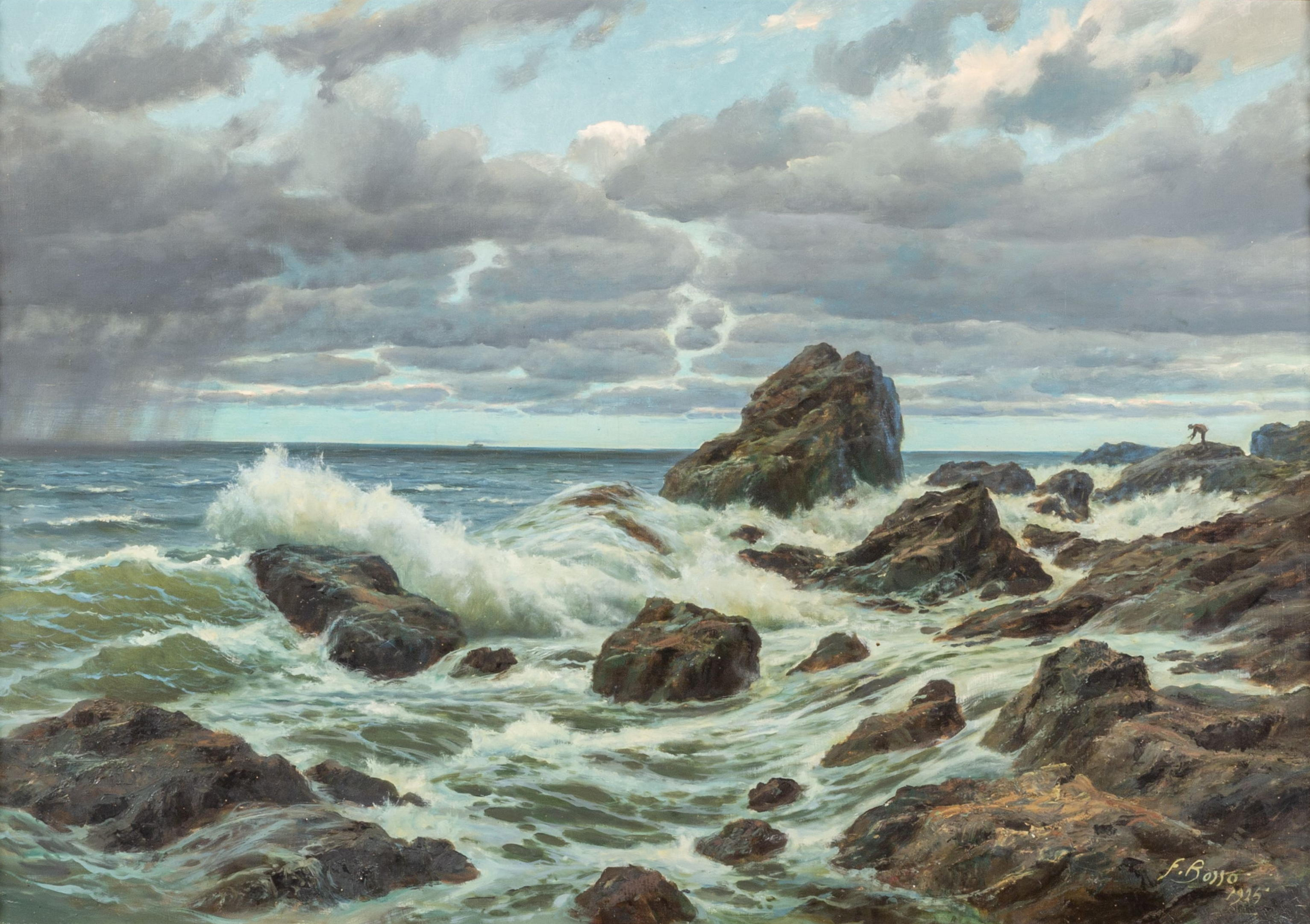
Mareggiata (Storm Surge), 1925.

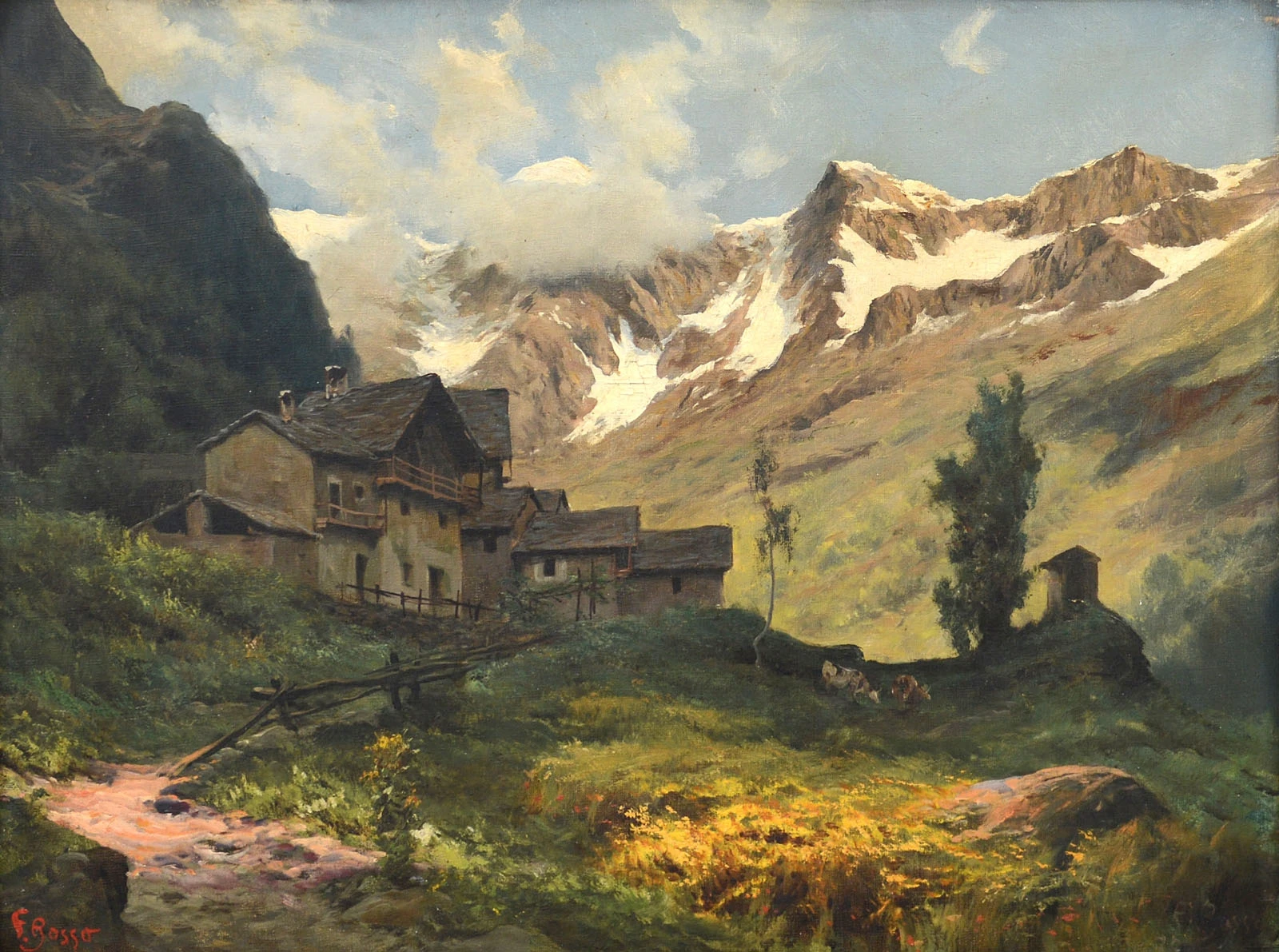
Last Snows, 1926.

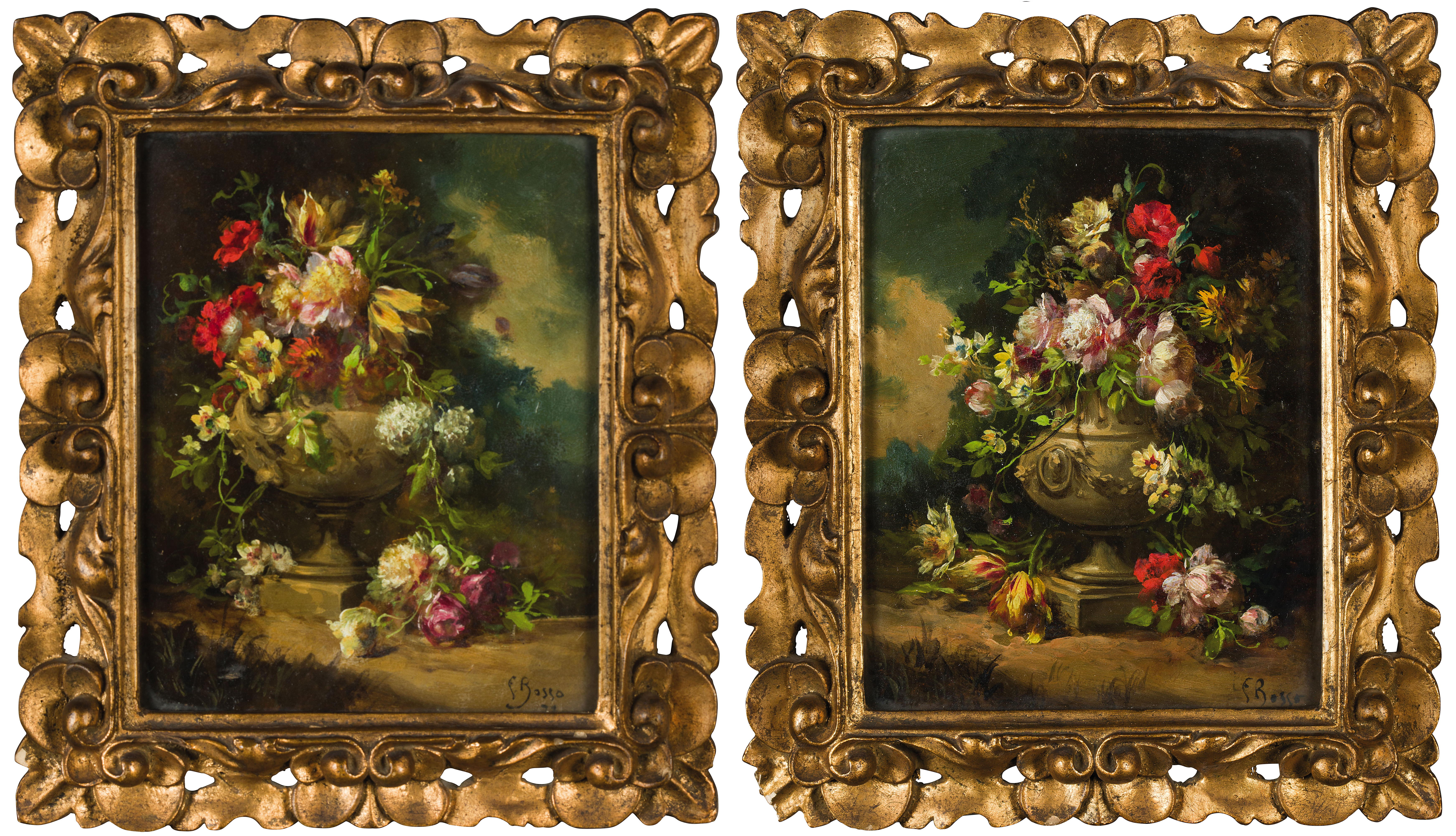
Floral still life pendants in carved, gilded frames.

== Gallery: signatures ==

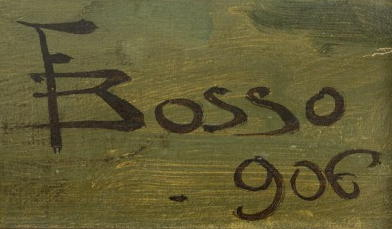

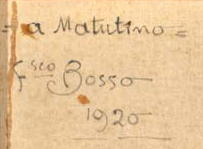

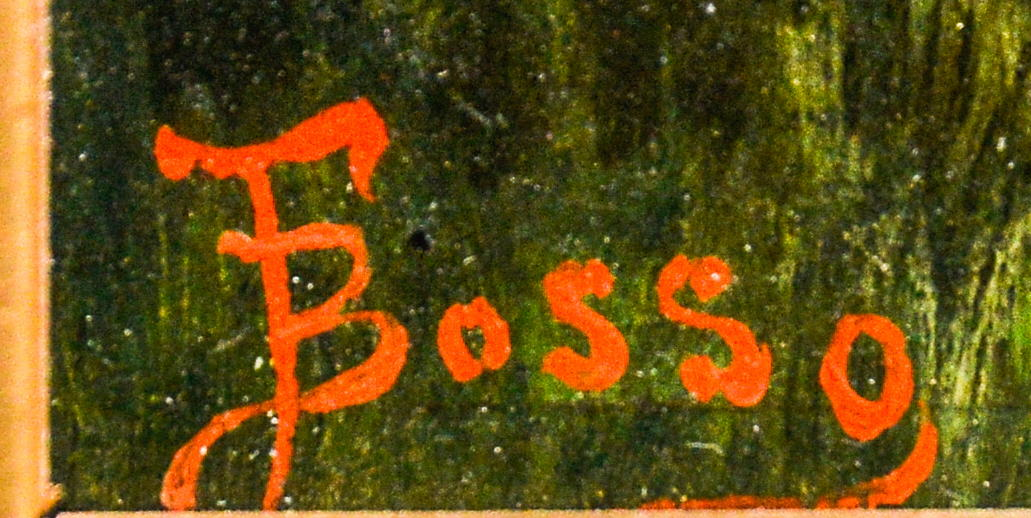

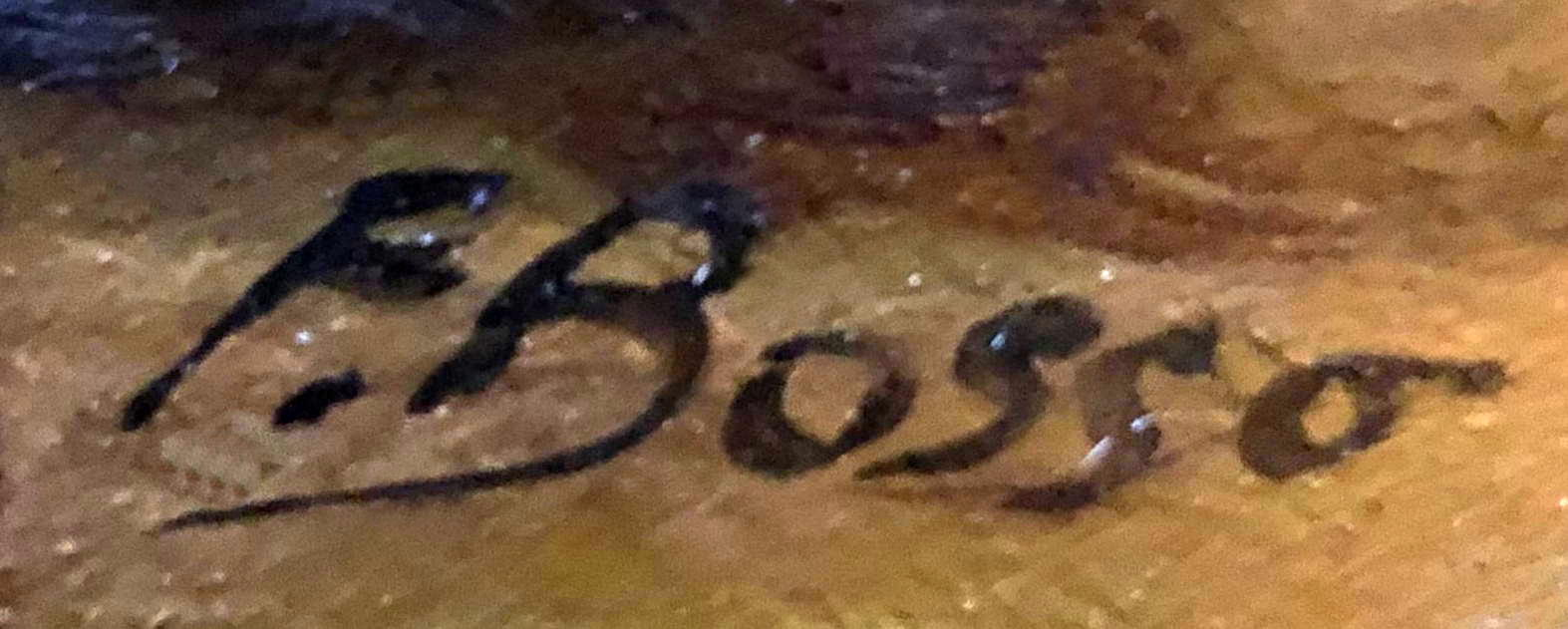

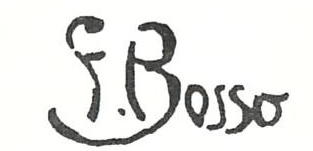

== Sources ==
- Arisi F. Galleria d'arte moderna Ricci Oddi di Piacenza, Piacenza: Edizioni Tip.Le.Co., 1988.
- Comanducci, Agostino Mario (1934). I pittori italiani dell'ottocento: dizionario critico e documentario, Milan: Casa editrice artisti d'Italia, s.a., 1934.
- Comanducci, Agostino Mario (1962). Dizionario illustrato dei pittori, disegnatori e incisori italiani moderni e contemporanei, third edition, Milan: Leonilde M. Patuzzi, 1962.
- Fugazza S. Galleria Ricci Oddi Guida, Milan: Skira, 2003.
- Marchegiani, Cristiano. "Sambonet, Roberto" in Dizionario Biografico degli Italiani, Volume 86, Rome: Enciclopedia Treccani, 2016.
