= Giuseppe Mariani =

Giuseppe Mariani may refer to:

- Giuseppe Mariani (doctor) (1885–1963), Italian doctor and medical researcher
- Giuseppe Mariani (art director) (fl. 1952–1992), Italian art director
