= Galleria d'arte moderna Ricci Oddi =

Art museum in Piacenza, Italy

Coordinates: 45.0485°N 9.6920°E

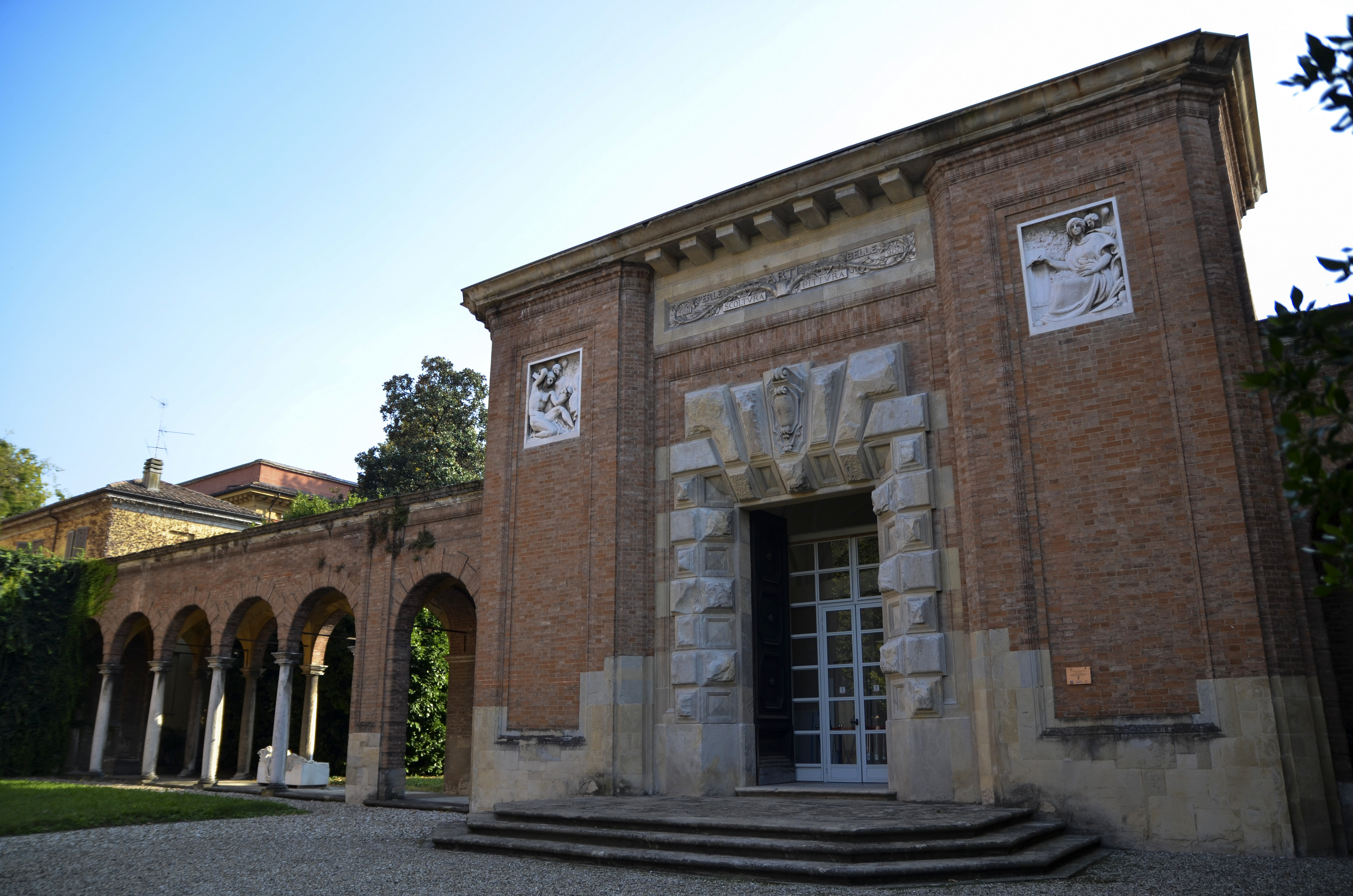
Facade of the museum

The Galleria d'arte moderna Ricci Oddi (Ricci Oddi Gallery of Modern Art) is an art museum, located on via San Siro #13 in Piacenza, region of Emilia-Romagna, Italy. The museum displays a collection of Modern Art from the last two hundred years.

== History ==
The gallery was founded in its own building due to the patronage of the local jurist and collector, Giuseppe Ricci Oddi (1868–1936). The building was constructed in 1931 using designs by Giulio Ulisse Arata on land adjacent to a deconsecrated convent, donated by the commune. The collections have expanded over the decades. The museum has today about 400 works of many local, mostly Italian, and some international painters.

Among the artists of the 19th century in the collection are works by: Francesco Hayez, Francesco Filippini, Giuseppe Pellizza da Volpedo, Giovanni Segantini, Giuseppe Amisani, Giovanni Carnovali, Gerolamo Induno, Giovanni Fattori, Silvestro Lega, Telemaco Signorini, Raffaello Sernesi, Giuseppe Abbati, Cristiano Banti, Tranquillo Cremona, Daniele Ranzoni, Luigi Conconi, Gaetano Previati, Angelo Morbelli, Antonio Fontanesi, François-Auguste Ravier, Antonio Mancini, Domenico Morelli, the brothers Palizzi, Francesco Paolo Michetti, Stefano Bruzzi, Francesco Ghittoni, Luciano Ricchetti, Federico Zandomeneghi, and Giuseppe De Nittis.

Among the artists of the 20th century in the gallery are works by: Francesco Bosso, Umberto Boccioni, Giulio Aristide Sartorio, Plinio Nomellini, Mario De Maria, Medardo Rosso, Giacomo Grosso, Amedeo Bocchi, Felice Carena, Carlo Carrà, Piero Marussig, Arturo Tosi, Massimo Campigli, Felice Casorati, Filippo De Pisis, Francesco Messina, Adolfo Wildt, Bruno Cassinari, and Achille Funi.

=== Theft and recovery of a Klimt painting ===
In 1997, the Portrait of a Lady by Gustav Klimt was stolen from this Gallery. The story is convoluted. After the theft, the frame was found in the roof of the gallery. Soon after the theft, on 1 April 1997, border police at the Italian/French frontier at Ventimiglia intercepted a package addressed to a former Italian prime minister. The package contained a high quality forgery of the painting. By 2016, the investigators in the case had spoken to someone who claimed to have replaced the original painting from the gallery with a forgery (likely the one intercepted at Ventimiglia). The art thief claimed to have stolen both the original and the forgery. The thief predicted the painting would soon be returned.

In December 2019, a gardener clearing ivy from the building’s walls discovered a small trapdoor behind, and upon opening it, found the painting wrapped in a plastic bag. It is unlikely that the painting has remained there since its disappearance.
