= Giuseppe Mariani (doctor) =

Italian dermatologist (1885–1963)

Giuseppe Mariani (25 February 1885 – 28 December 1963) was an Italian dermatologist and medical researcher. During World War I he received the Silver Medal of Military Valor while attempting to rescue injured soldiers. After the war he returned to his work on dermatology and eventually moved to the University of Genoa where he chaired the department of dermatological studies and ran its clinic. He used the city's San Martino Hospital's leprosarium to hide Jews from deportation to Germany during the Holocaust. He retired from the university in 1955, but continued to publish research during his retirement.

== Life ==
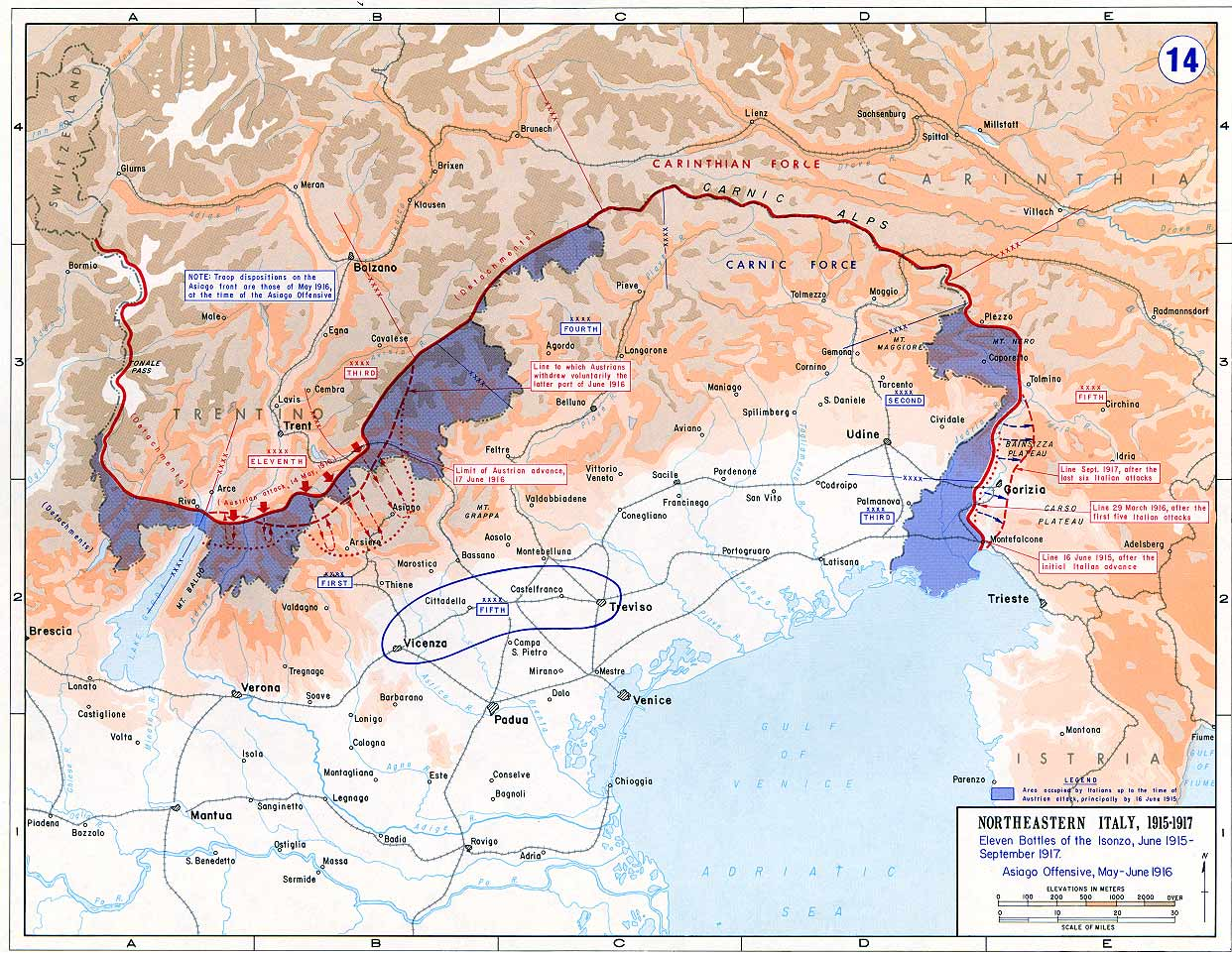
The Austrian front during World War I

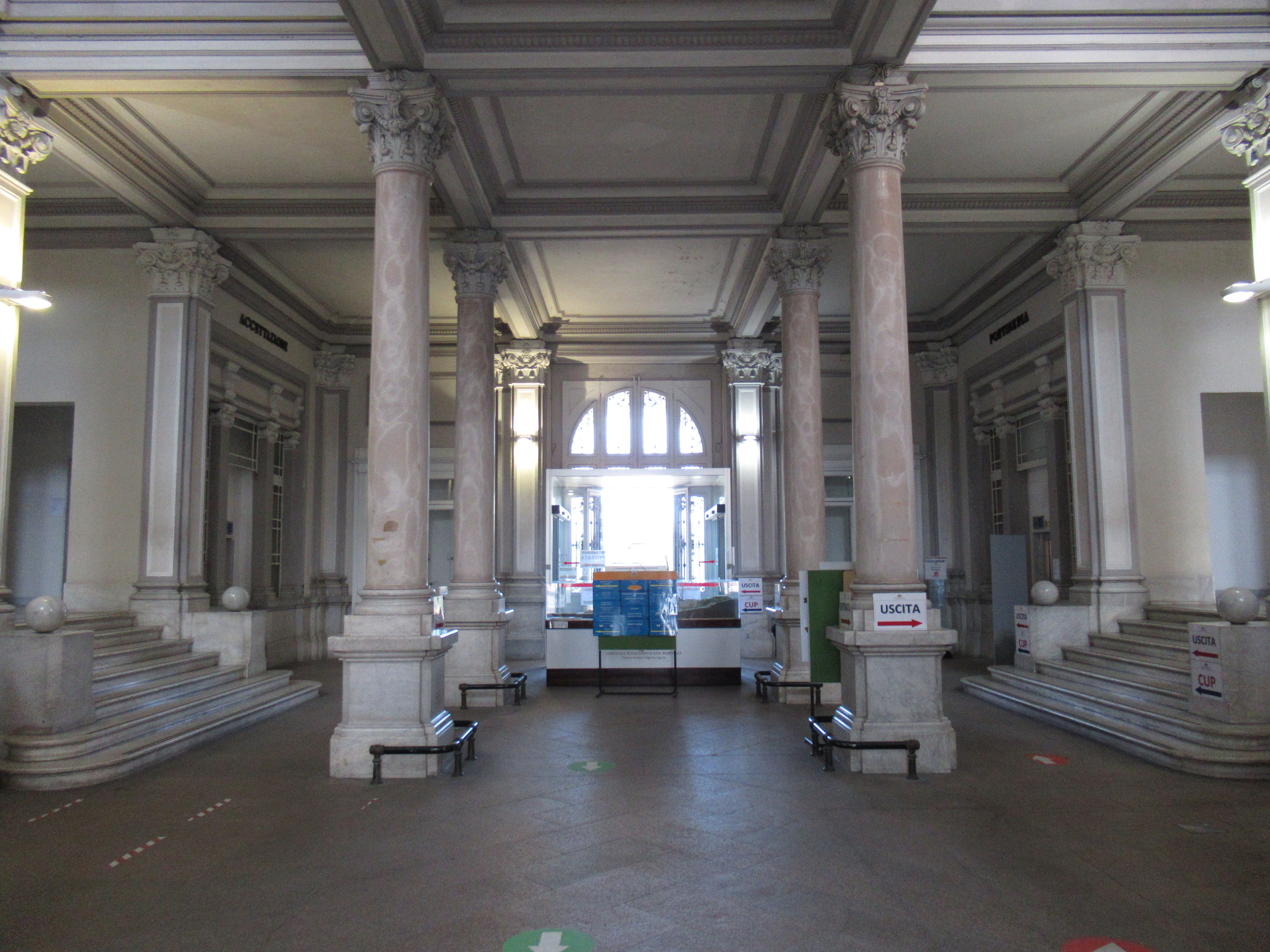
The entrance to San Martino Hospital in Genoa

Giuseppe Mariani was born on 25 February 1885 in Milan, Italy. His parents were Lorenzo and Francesca Peroglio Mariani. He studied medicine under Camillo Golgi and others at the University of Pavia, graduating with honors on 9 July 1909. He went to work at the dermatology clinic run by his professor Umberto Mantegazza until 1913. He became a lecturer at a separate dermosyphilopathic clinic on 17 November 1913. ("Dermosyphilopathy" has been the usual medical term in Italian for most kinds of venereal disease, considering them primarily to be a form of skin disease.)

During World War I, Mariani worked at a field hospital on the Austrian front. In late October 1915, he was wounded at Mount San Michele near Gorizia during the Third Battle of the Isonzo. He had been attempting to rescue injured soldiers lying in the open between the two sides, an action for which he received Italy's Silver Medal of Military Valor.

After the war, he taught dermosyphilopathic medicine at the University of Pavia (1921–22), the University of Cagliari on Sardinia (1923–25), and the newly-founded University of Bari (1925–35), where his chair in dermosyphilopathy had been established by Nicola Pende. On 14 December 1925, he founded the Apulian branch of the Italian Society of Dermatology and Syphilography. While at Bari, he also established and ran the university's 100-bed dermosyphilopathic clinic and laboratory with 2 assistants. He served as the university's rector from 1930–35, when he returned to Pavia to succeed Mantegazza as head of the university clinic.

While at Bari, he conducted his own experiments confirming the usefulness of the lepromin skin test recently devised by Kensuke Mitsuda, introducing it to Italian medicine. He also introduced the leishmaniasis treatments based on derivatives of antimony developed by Giuseppe Caronia and others to his area of Apulia. On his own, Mariani worked on venereal diseases, developing a rapid method of identifying cases of syphilis microscopically to improve efficiency while performing tens of thousands of treatments, mostly using bismuth and arsenobenzols. His work sought to integrate the findings of histopathological surveys into the existing diagnostic methodology based on morphological analysis and also to pay greater attention to subcutaneous diagnosis and treatment.

In 1937, Mariani moved to Genoa, where he took over the university's chair and clinic for dermosyphilopathic studies. He continued to research a number of areas including dermatological diagnosis and treatment in oncology, but increasingly focused on allergology. He used the San Martino Hospital's leprosarium to hide Jews, protecting them from deportation to Germany during the Holocaust.

He left the university in 1955 at the age of 70, but continued to publish work on pyoderma and antibiotics while in retirement. He died from heart disease on 28 December 1963 in Genoa, Italy.

== Works ==
- Sifilide e Matrimonio [Syphilis and Marriage], Pavia: Mattei & Speroni, 1911. (Italian)
- "Osservazioni sopra una Forma di Allergia Cutanea nella Lebbra: Lepra Tubercoloide Sperimentale nell'Uomo [Observations on a Form of Cutaneous Anaphylaxis in Leprosy: Experimental Human Tuberculoid Leprosy]", Pathologica [Pathology], vol. 16, no. 380, vol. 16, Genoa: Società Anatomo-Patologi Ospedalieri Italiani, 15 September 1924, pp. 471–477. (Italian)
- "Nuove Osservazioni sulle Reazioni Provocate Sperimentalmente con Materiale Lebbroso nell'Uomo [New Observations on Reactions Experimentally Provoked with Human Leprose Material]", Giornale Italiano di Dermatologia e Sifilologia [Italian Journal of Dermatology and Syphilology], no. 66, Turin: Società Italiana di Dermatologia e Sifilografia, 1925, pp. 402–426. (Italian)
- La Questione Sessuale [The Sexual Question], Milan: Istituto Editoriale Scientifico, 1926. (Italian)
