= Giulio Arata =

Italian architect

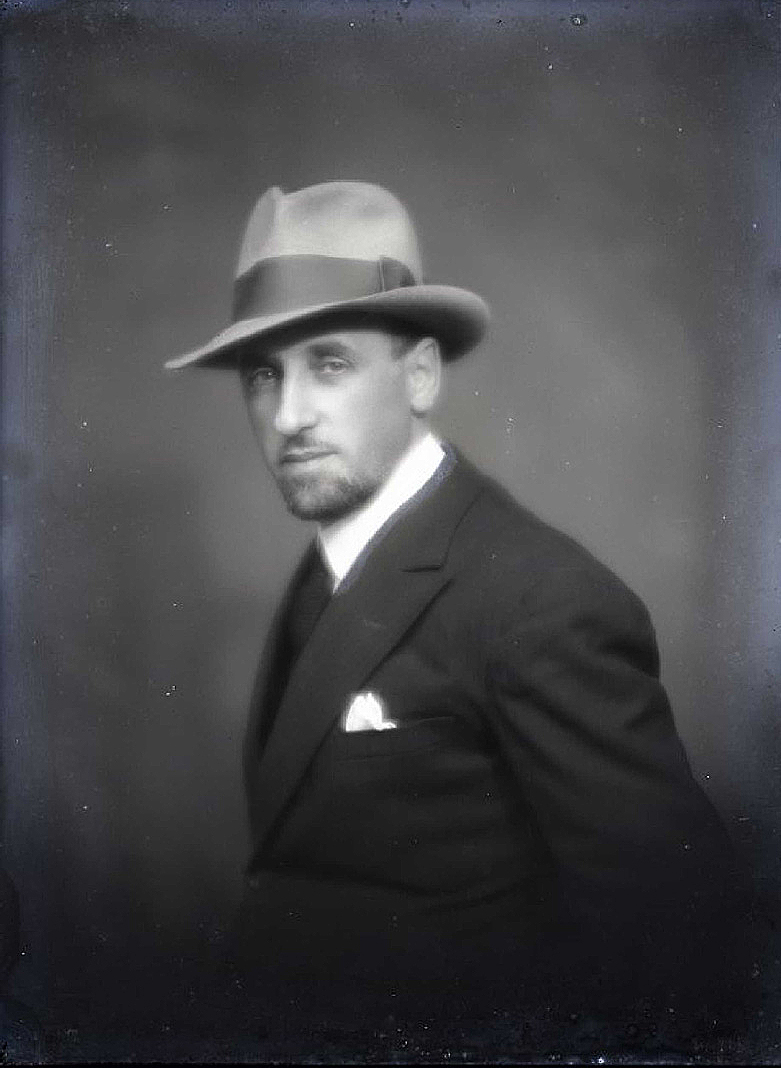
- Born: Giulio Ulisse Arata; 21 August 1881; Piacenza, Italy
- Died: 15 September 1962 (aged 81); Piacenza, Italy
- Occupation: Architect

Giulio Ulisse Arata (21 August 1881 – 15 September 1962) was an Italian architect. His work was part of the architecture event in the art competition at the 1936 Summer Olympics. One of his most notable works is the Bologna Football Stadium (1927). he also designed the Galleria d'arte moderna Ricci Oddi in Piacenza.
