= Margherita d'Anjou =

1820 French opera

- Opera by Giacomo Meyerbeer
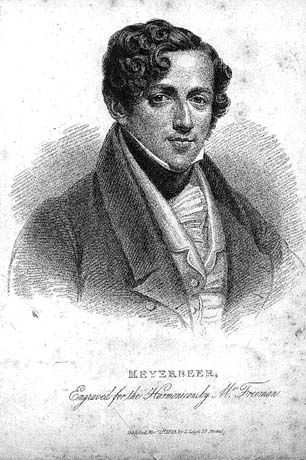
- Giacomo Meyerbeer, c. 1825
- Librettist: Felice Romani
- Language: Italian
- Premiere: 14 November 1820; La Scala, Milan

Margherita d'Anjou is an opera semiseria in two acts by Giacomo Meyerbeer. The Italian libretto was by Felice Romani after a text based on legends around the English Wars of the Roses by René-Charles Guilbert de Pixérécourt. The title role is the Queen Margaret of Shakespeare's Henry VI plays, who also appears in Richard III. Margherita d'Anjou is the first opera by Meyerbeer to mix historical events and personages with fictional characters and situations, as his French grand operas Les Huguenots, Le prophète and L'Africaine were later to do. It is the fourth of Meyerbeer's Italian operas and was his first international success.

== Performance history ==
Margherita d'Anjou was first given at La Scala, Milan, on 14 November 1820. It was successful and was subsequently performed throughout Europe in Italian, French and German. The French version, premiered at the Théâtre Odéon in Paris on 3 November 1826 is a major revision with added music from other works by the composer. It was given in New Orleans on 17 April 1854. There was a concert performance of the original Italian version at the Royal Festival Hall, London, in November 2002, and the opera was staged at the Festival della Valle d'Itria in 2017. A new critical edition of the score was published by Ricordi Berlin in 2015.

== Roles ==
Roles, voice types, and premiere cast
Role	Voice type	Premiere cast, 14 November 1820 Conductor: Giacomo Meyerbeer
Margherita d'Anjou, widow of Henry VI of England	soprano	Carolina Pellegrini
Isaura, wife of the Duke of Lavarenne, disguised as Eugenio	mezzo-soprano	Rosa Mariani
The Duke of Lavarenne, Grand Senechal of Normandy	tenor	Nicola Tacchinardi
Carlo Belmonte, general banished by the Queen, currently employed by Gloucester	bass	Nicolas-Prosper Levasseur
Michele Gamautte, French physician	basso buffo	Nicola Bassi
Gertrude	soprano	Paola Monticelli
Bellapunta, officer of the Queen	tenor	Pietro Gentili
Orner, officer of the Queen	bass	
Riccardo, Duke of Gloucester	bass	Michele Cavara

== Synopsis ==
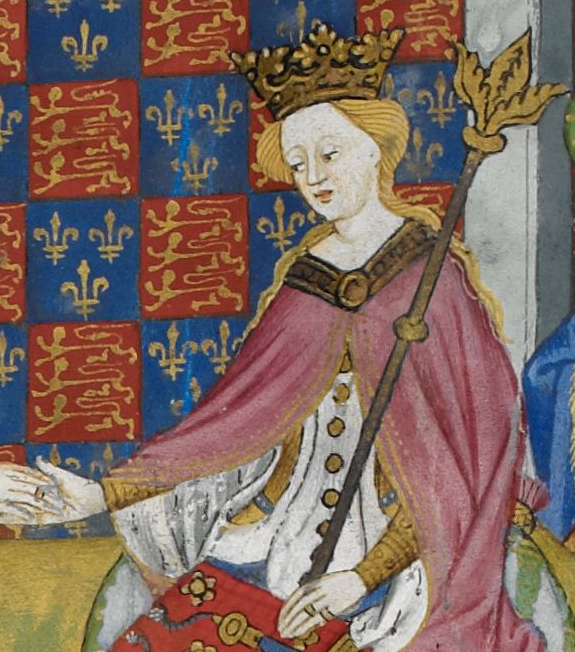
Margaret of Anjou

Scene: The highlands of Scotland, c. 1462

The widowed Queen Margherita, whose husband King Henry VI was driven off the throne and then killed in the English Civil War known as the Wars of the Roses, fled to France and has now returned to Britain with an army in an attempt to reclaim the throne on behalf of her son. She and her army met defeat in battle and she has been forced to retreat to the wilderness in Scotland with her remaining supporters. Among them are the French nobleman the Duke of Lavarenne, who fell in love with Margherita while she was in exile in France, and has left his wife to be with her. However his wife Isaura will not accept this, and, disguised as a man, has followed her husband to Scotland as an assistant to Gamautte, the French physician in waiting on the Queen. Riccardo, Duke of Gloucester, who drove Margherita's husband from the throne, has pursued her and her army to Scotland. Margherita attempts to evade him by disguising herself as a simple woman, the wife of Gamautte. The disguised Isaura has the disagreeable task of delivering love letters from her husband to Margherita in her disguise. Riccardo Duke of Gloucester sees through Margherita's disguise and seizes her son. Gamautte and the Duke of Lavarenne plot an attack to rescue Margherita and her son, which is successful. General Belmonte, who had switched allegiance from Margherita to Gloucester, returns to her service and Riccardo is defeated. The Queen and her son are saved, and the penitent Duke of Lavarenne returns to his forgiving wife.

== Musical features ==
Margherita d'Anjou is unique among Meyerbeer's Italian operas in featuring a role for a comic part, the basso buffo role of the physician Gamautte. The music for the singers demands virtuoso performances and includes a very unusual trio of basses.

== Recording ==
- 2002 – Margherita: Annick Massis, Duke of Lavarenne: Bruce Ford, Isaura: Daniela Barcellona, Carlo: Alastair Miles, Michele: Fabio Previati, Duke of Gloucester: Pauls Putnins; London Philharmonic Orchestra, David Parry; CD: Opera Rara ORC 25.
