= Portrait of a Lady (Klimt) =

1916–1917 painting by Gustav Klimt

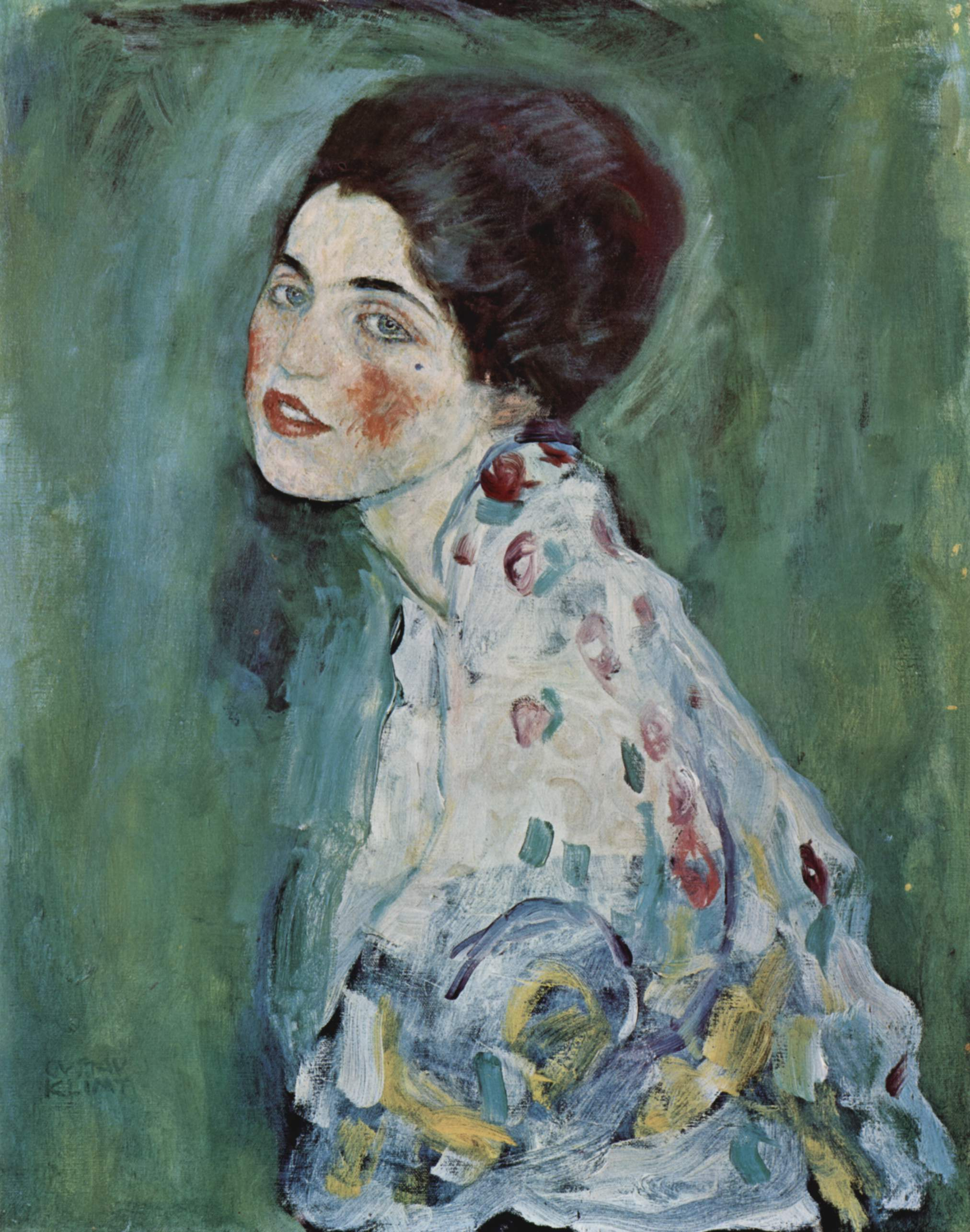
- Artist: Gustav Klimt
- Year: 1916–1917
- Medium: Oil on canvas
- Dimensions: 60 cm × 55 cm (24 in × 22 in)
- Location: Galleria d'arte moderna Ricci Oddi; Piacenza

Portrait of a Lady is an oil painting on canvas by Gustav Klimt, painted between 1916 and 1917. The painting measures 60 by 55 centimetres (24 in × 22 in). It depicts a portrait of a female figure, composed in an unusually lively expressionistic style. It was acquired by the Galleria Ricci-Oddi in Piacenza in 1925.

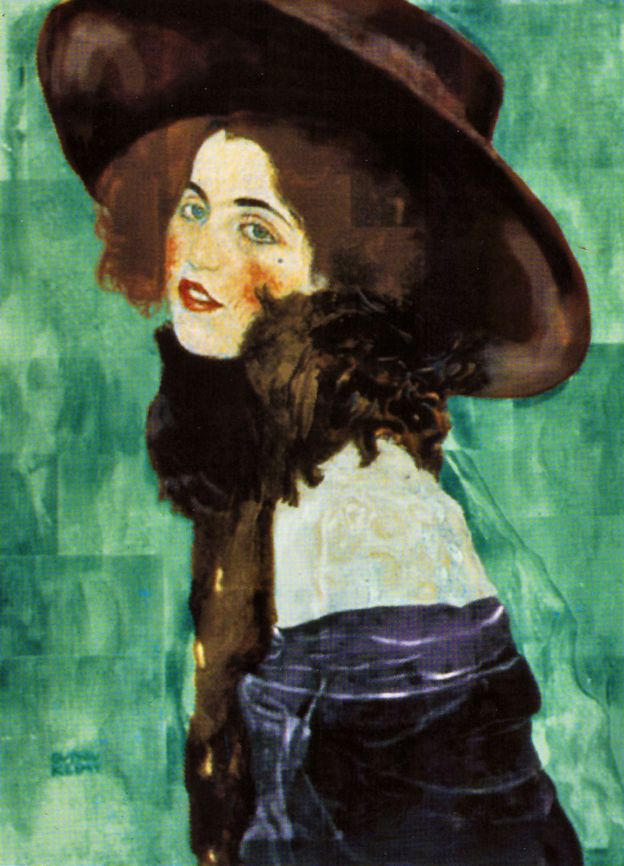
Portrait of a Young Lady, as it would have looked before the artist repainted it as Portrait of a Lady.

In 1996, X-ray analysis revealed that the portrait was an overpainted version of Klimt's lost work Portrait of a Young Lady (in hat and with scarf), which disappeared in 1917. The original portrait showed a woman with whom Klimt is believed to have had a love affair, but after she died suddenly, he painted over the work.

== Theft ==
The painting was believed stolen on 22 February 1997, shortly before a special exhibition was planned at the gallery, during the renovation of the building. The frame was found discarded on the roof next to a skylight, which was, however, too small for the painting to have been removed through.

In April 1997, the Italian police authorities discovered a high-quality forgery at Ventimiglia, on the Italian border with France, in a package addressed to the former Italian Prime Minister Bettino Craxi who was hiding from the law in Hammamet, Tunisia. The "theft" in February may have been staged shortly before the exhibition to cover up the swap of the original painting with the forgery some months before. The case was reopened in 2014 after new DNA testing of the painting's frame. Various copies of the painting were known to the Italian police.

In December 2019, 23 years after the theft, a bag containing what was believed to be the missing painting was recovered from a recess in an exterior wall of the gallery by gardeners clearing away ivy, which had overgrown over the recess at least 10 years prior. The painting was confirmed to be the missing Portrait of a Lady the following month. The painting went on exhibition for 5 months in the Museum of Rome from the end of October 2021, before returning to the Galleria Ricci-Oddi in Piacenza. The investigation into the painting's theft was closed as unsolved.

== See also ==
- 1917 in art
- List of paintings by Gustav Klimt
- List of stolen paintings
