= International Exhibition of Marine and Maritime Hygiene =

International exhibition of marine and maritime hygiene
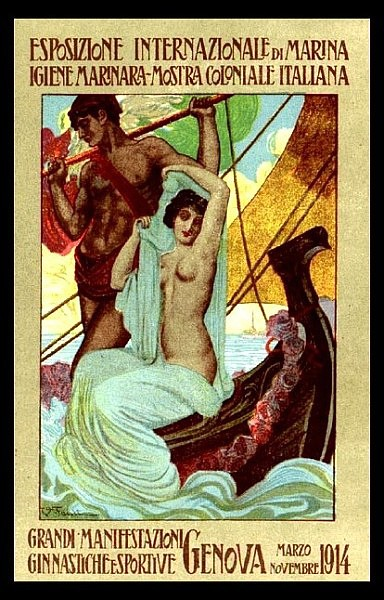

Overview
- BIE-class: Unrecognized exposition
- Name: International exhibition of marine and maritime hygiene
- Area: Piazza della Vittoria
- Visitors: 1035000

Location
- Country: Italy
- City: Genoa

Timeline
- Opening: 23 May 1914
- Closure: 15 December 1914

Universal
- Previous: Exposition universelle et internationale (1913) in Ghent
- Next: Panama–Pacific International Exposition in San Francisco

The International exhibition of marine and maritime hygiene was a world's fair held in Genoa in 1914.

== Summary ==
The fair was held between May 23, 1914 and 15 December 1914 with the aim of showing life in Italian colonies.

The fair was opened by Vittorio Emanuele III and Queen Elena.

== Contents ==
The overall design of the fair was by Gino Coppedè. There were 1200 exhibitors from all continents.

There were displays from the colonies of Eritrea, Somalia, Cyrenaica and Tripolitania and one about the economics of the territories in Africa.

In addition to individual colonies there was a stadium, a copy of the Galata Tower (which had been built when Galata was a Republic of Genoa colony) and a mosque.

Attractions included a large diorama created by Francesco Bosso of the Panama Canal, which opened in 1914.

== Transportation ==
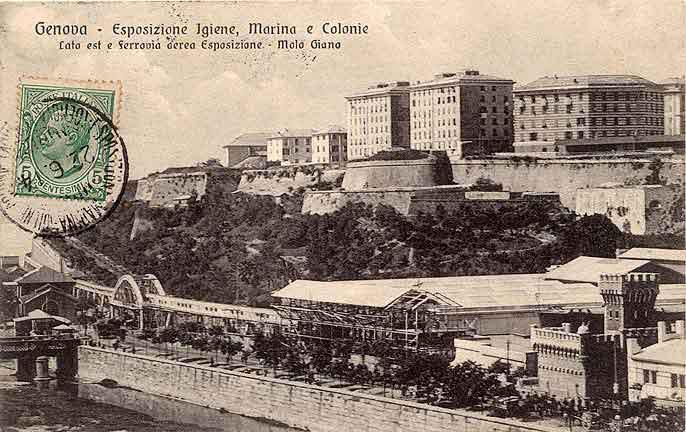
The monorail next to the exhibition

A monorail and a cable car were both built for the exhibition, with the monorail, known as Telfer, continuing to run until 1918.

== See also ==
- Italian Empire
