= Mariani =

Mariani may refer to:

- Mariani (surname), an Italian surname
- Mariani, Jorhat, of Assam, India
- Mariani, a residential Art Deco sector in Barrio Primero in Ponce, Puerto Rico
- Mariani Maximin (1914–2011), Caribbean politician

== Other ==
- Villa Mariani, located in Bordighera, Province of Imperia, Italy
- Vin Mariani, a tonic drink created by chemist Angelo Mariani
- Mariani, the Latin term for the supporters of the Roman general Gaius Marius
- Mariani College, general degree college established in 1966 at Mariani, in Jorhat district, Assam
- Mariani (Vidhan Sabha constituency), one of the 126 assembly constituencies of Assam Legislative Assembly
- Guwahati–Mariani Intercity Express, an Express train belonging to Indian Railways Northeast Frontier Railway zone, in India
