= Luciano Mariani =

Italian opera singer (1801–1859)

Luciano Mariani (1801 – 10 June 1859) was an Italian operatic bass. Amongst the several roles he created were Rodolfo in Bellini's La sonnambula [Milan, Teatro Carcano, 1831], Alfonso d'Este in Donizetti's Lucrezia Borgia and Oroe in Rossini's Semiramide. His elder sister, Rosa Mariani, was also an opera singer (contralto) and sang Arsace in the premiere of Semiramide. They toured Italy singing together in many operas. Mariani sang in Lisbon at the Teatro São Carlos from 1839 to 1840, where he appeared in several Portuguese premieres of Italian operas, as well as the world premieres of Antonio Luís Miró's opera Virginia and Manuel Inocêncio Liberato dos Santos's opera Inês de Castro. Mariani was born in Cremona and died in Castell'Arquato, aged 58.
