= Giovanni Maria Mariani =

Italian painter

Giovanni Maria Mariani was an Italian painter of the Baroque period, active mainly in Siena and Rome in the preparation of stage opera sets and scenography.
