= Rosa Mariani =

Italian opera singer (1799–1864)

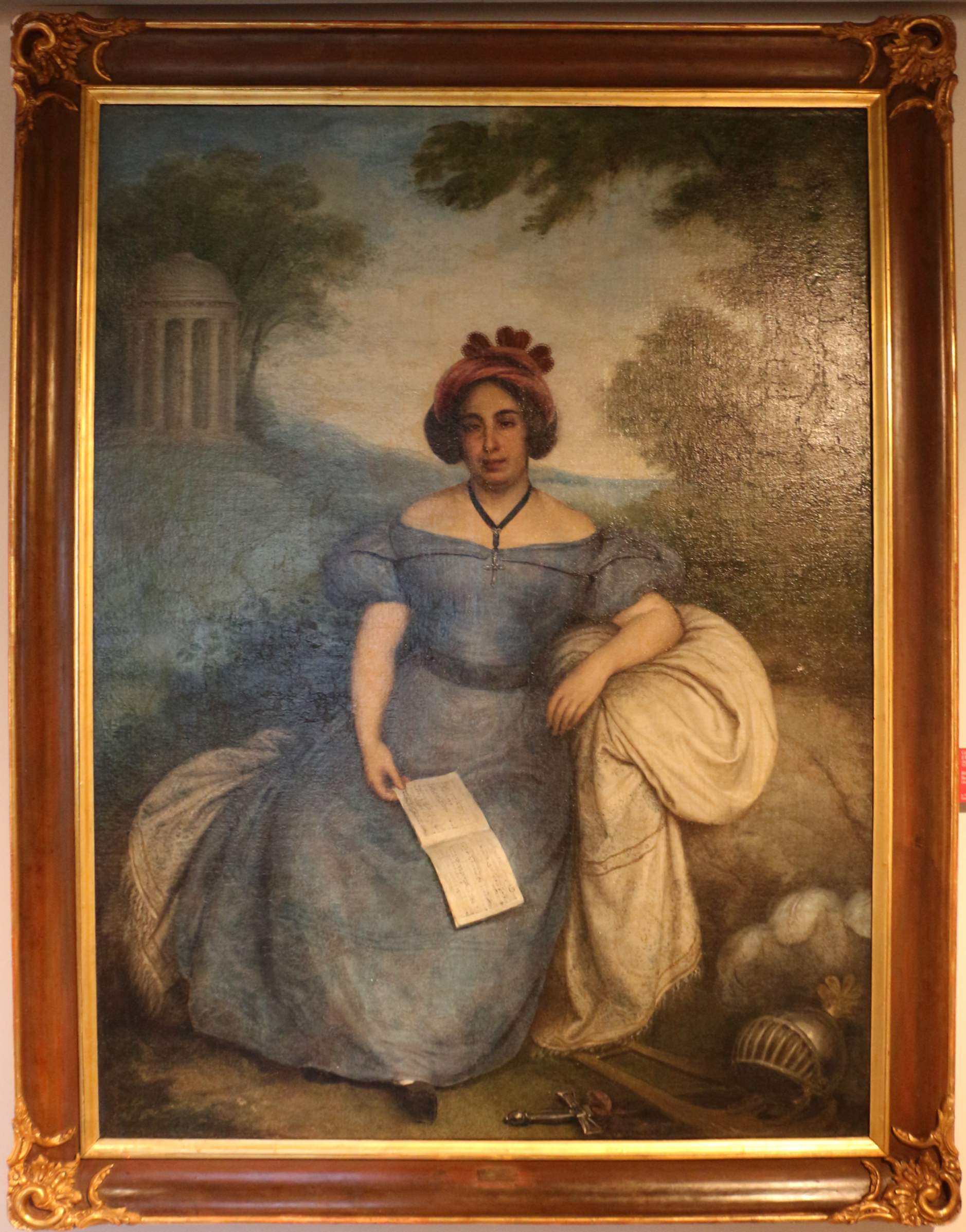
Portrait by Giovanni Carnovali

Rosa Mariani (1799–1864) was an Italian coloratura contralto opera singer who was born and died in Cremona, Italy. She made her stage debut there in 1818.

She played Isaura in the 1820 premiere of Giacomo Meyerbeer's Margherita d'Anjou (in La Scala) and in 1823 performed the role of Arsace in the premiere of Rossini's Semiramide at the Teatro La Fenice opera house in Venice. She was the older sister of bass Luciano Mariani, who played Oroe in the original production of Semiramide, and with whom she toured Italy. In 1832, the siblings performed in London's King's Theatre. (As announced by theater proprietor Thomas Monck Mason at the time.)
