= Gindetta Mariani =

Italian botanist (1870–1950)

Gindetta Mariani (1876-after 1911), also credited as Guiditta Mariani was an Italian botanist, mycologist, and plant taxonomist. The standard author abbreviation Mariani is used to indicate this person as the author when citing a botanical name.

== Identified species ==
- Pleospora arundinis Mariani, Atti della Societtaliana di scienze naturali e del Museo civico di storia naturale di Milano 50: 166 (1911)
