= Giovanni Carnovali =

Italian painter

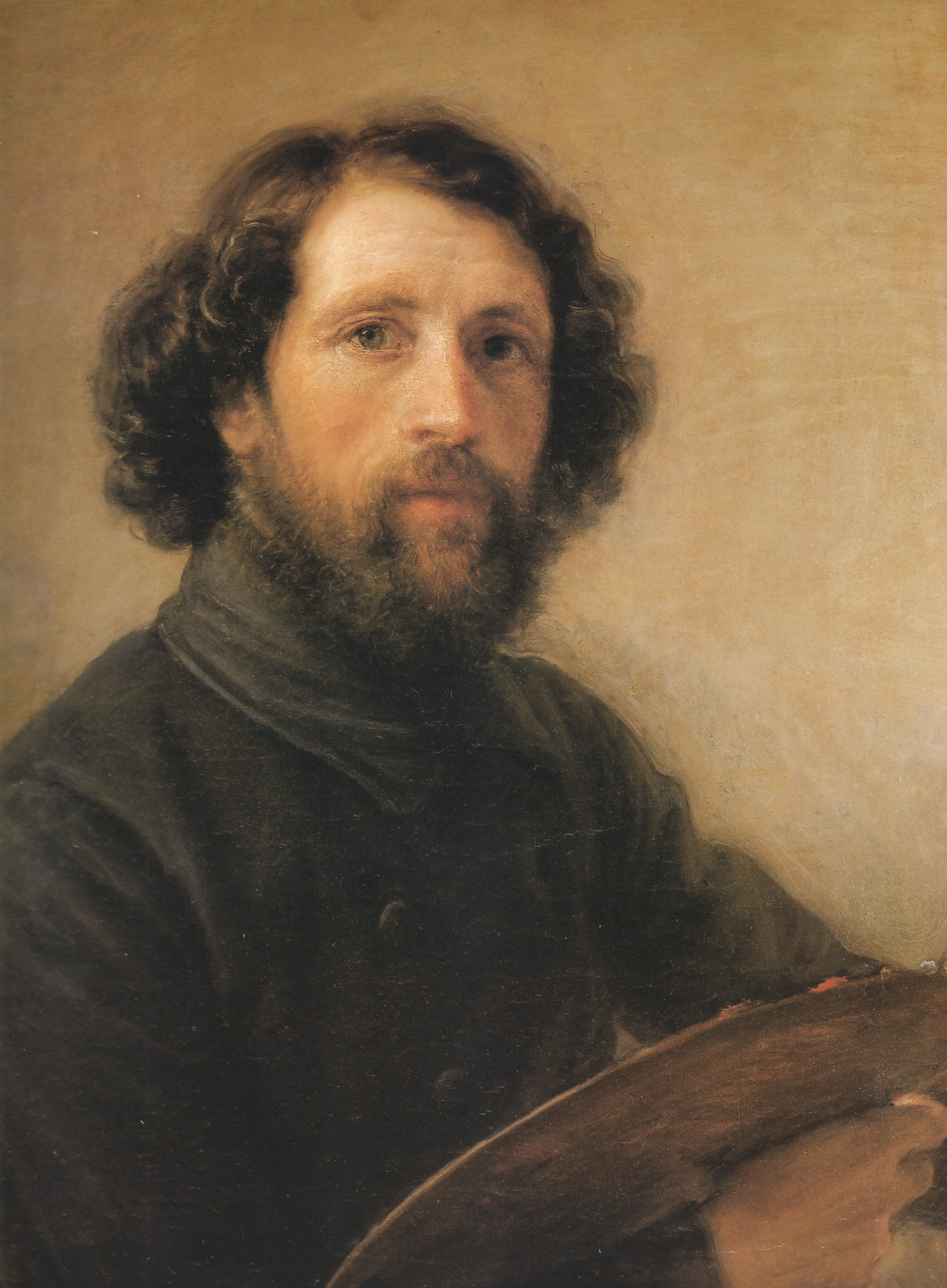
- Self-portrait
- Born: 29 September 1804; Montegrino Valtravaglia, Kingdom of Italy
- Died: 7 November 1873 (aged 69); Sissa Trecasali, Parma, Kingdom of Italy
- Known for: Painting
- Movement: Romanticism

Giovanni Carnovali (29 September 1804 – 5 July 1873), known as Il Piccio ('the little one'), was an Italian painter. Trained as an academic painter, he gradually shifted towards painting of a less descriptive character with soft, hazy outlines under the influence of Correggio and Andrea Appiani. His work exerted a strong influence on Milanese artists of the next generation, the group known as the Scapigliati.

== Biography ==
=== Early life and education ===
Carnovali was born in Montegrino Valtravaglia (Varese). In 1815, at the age of just 11, he was admitted to the Carrara Academy in Bergamo under the guidance of the director Giuseppe Diotti, who immediately recognised his young pupil's natural talent. The artist soon began to break away from the strict Neoclassicism of his academic training and return to the figurative tradition of the 16th and 17th century, which he interpreted with great expressive freedom, especially in portrait painting. His debut at the exhibition of the Carrara Academy and his first major public commission for a work on a religious subject came in 1826.

=== Career ===
After the first short trips for study purposes, made on foot in the second half of the 1820s, he travelled as far as Rome in 1831. He also visited Parma, where he was attracted more by the soft outlines and colours in the work of Correggio and Parmigianino than by the Neoclassical artists. He returned to Lombardy in 1832 and opened a studio in Cremona. Two outstanding examples of his portraiture during this period are Giovanni Beltrami (1832–5; Cremona, Museo Civico Ala Ponzone) and Portrait of Giuseppe Manara with a Servant (1842; Bergamo, priv. col.), both of which clearly refer to 16th-century Italian portraiture.

In 1835 Carnevali transferred his studio to Milan, where it remained until his death. A solitary and retiring character, he did not frequent Milanese artistic circles, acquiring a reputation for unconventionality in his life-style and in his art. He took part in the Brera exhibitions just twice, in 1839 and 1840. Carnevali did not acquire great artistic renown in Milan, his style being the antithesis of that practised by the highly successful Francesco Hayez. Both artists have been identified as early exponents of the Italian form of Romanticism, but whereas Hayez tended towards the academic, Carnevali was more emotive and atmospheric. He placed many small touches of different colours on the canvas to produce a shimmering, luminous effect.

Despite his artistic isolation in Milan, Carnevali was in contact with people connected with La Scala, and a number of important, full-length portraits such as that of Rosa Mariani (Cremona, Museo Civico Ala Ponzone) derive from this association. In 1845 Carnevali visited Paris with Giacomo Trécourt, head of the art school in Pavia and former fellow student at the Accademia Carrara. Both were primarily interested in seeing Delacroix’s works, but Carnevali was also attracted by the light effects and the use of colour in the work of Jean-Baptiste-Camille Corot and the Barbizon school artists, which were reflected in his own Landscape with Large Trees (1850; Milan, Galleria d'Arte Moderna), and in the work of Watteau, Jean-Honoré Fragonard and Correggio, whose influence can be seen in Ariadne Abandoned (c. 1850; Pavia, Pinacoteca Malaspina).

=== Later work ===
The fruit of these multiple influences can be seen in three important late works. The church of San Martino in Alzano Maggiore, near Bergamo, probably commissioned the first of these, Hagar in the Desert (Bergamo, Galleria dell'Accademia Carrara), around 1840, but Carnevali did not begin work on it until about 1855. Many related preparatory drawings and sketches for this painting survive. When completed in 1863, its grandiose, sweeping forms, combined with Carnevali’s atmospheric interpretation of light and colour, were so different from contemporary religious works that the paintings proved unacceptable to the church commissioners. Following a heated debate among Bergamo intellectuals, and despite Trécourt’s defence of the work, it was eventually rejected.

Moses Rescued from the Waters (1866; Bergamo, priv. col.) is perhaps one of Carnevali’s most representative works. Its dream-like combination of landscape and figures, in which the action seems suspended in a pearly luminosity of fragmented brushstrokes, was of great importance to Scapigliati artists and remains one of Carnevali’s most imposing and successful works.

The Bather ( 1869; Milan, Galleria d'Arte Moderna) reveals yet another element in Carnevali’s constantly evolving style, since it has been interpreted both as the culmination of his work in the Romantic vein and, in its treatment of the figure, as a parallel to Realism. Carnovali died on 5 July 1873, aged 68. His pupils included Tranquillo Cremona, one the foremost painters of late-19th century Italy.

== Gallery ==
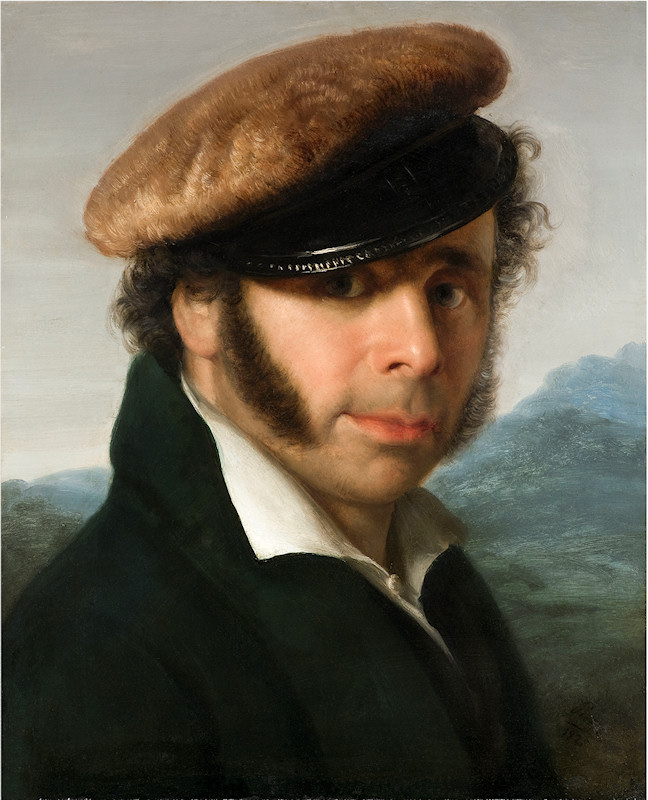
Portrait of Pietro Ronzoni, oil on panel (1825)

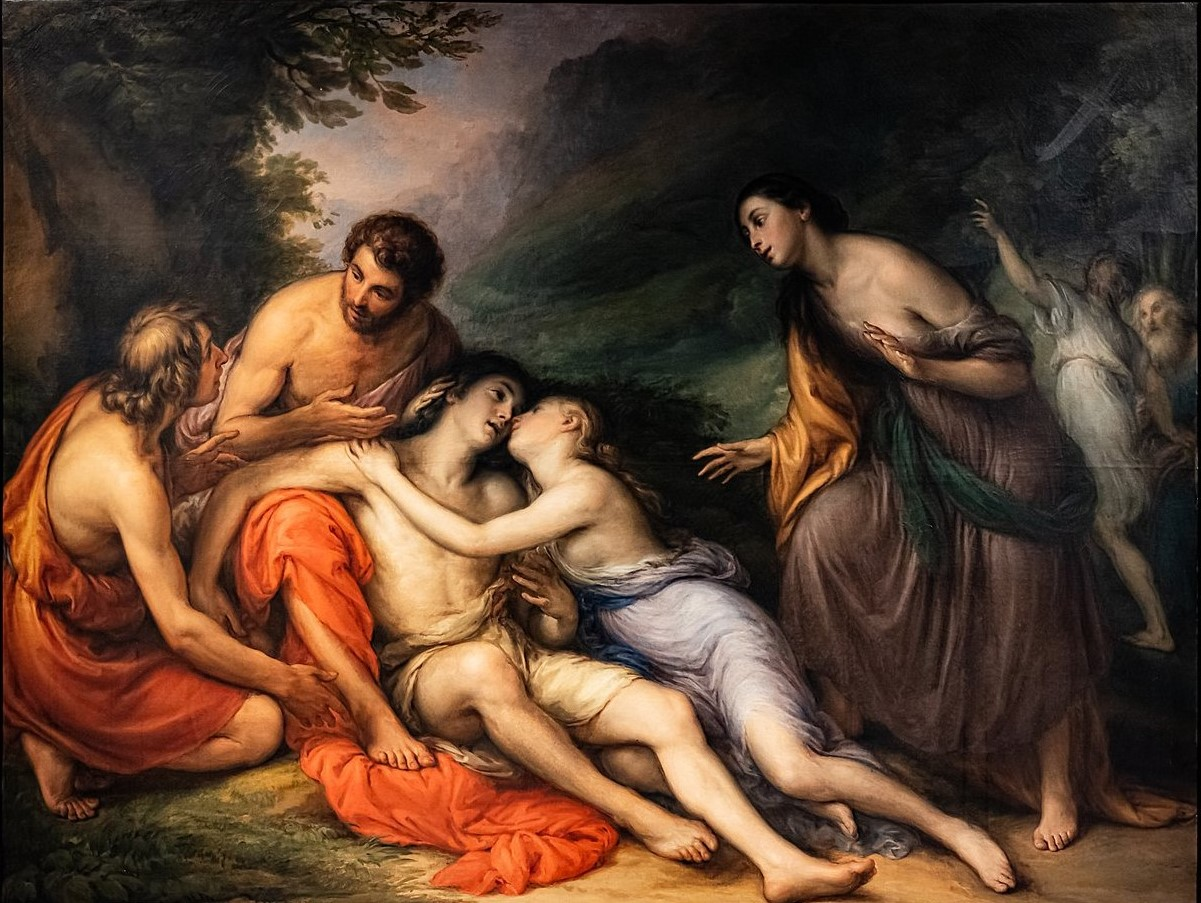
The death of Aminta, oil on canvas (1832)

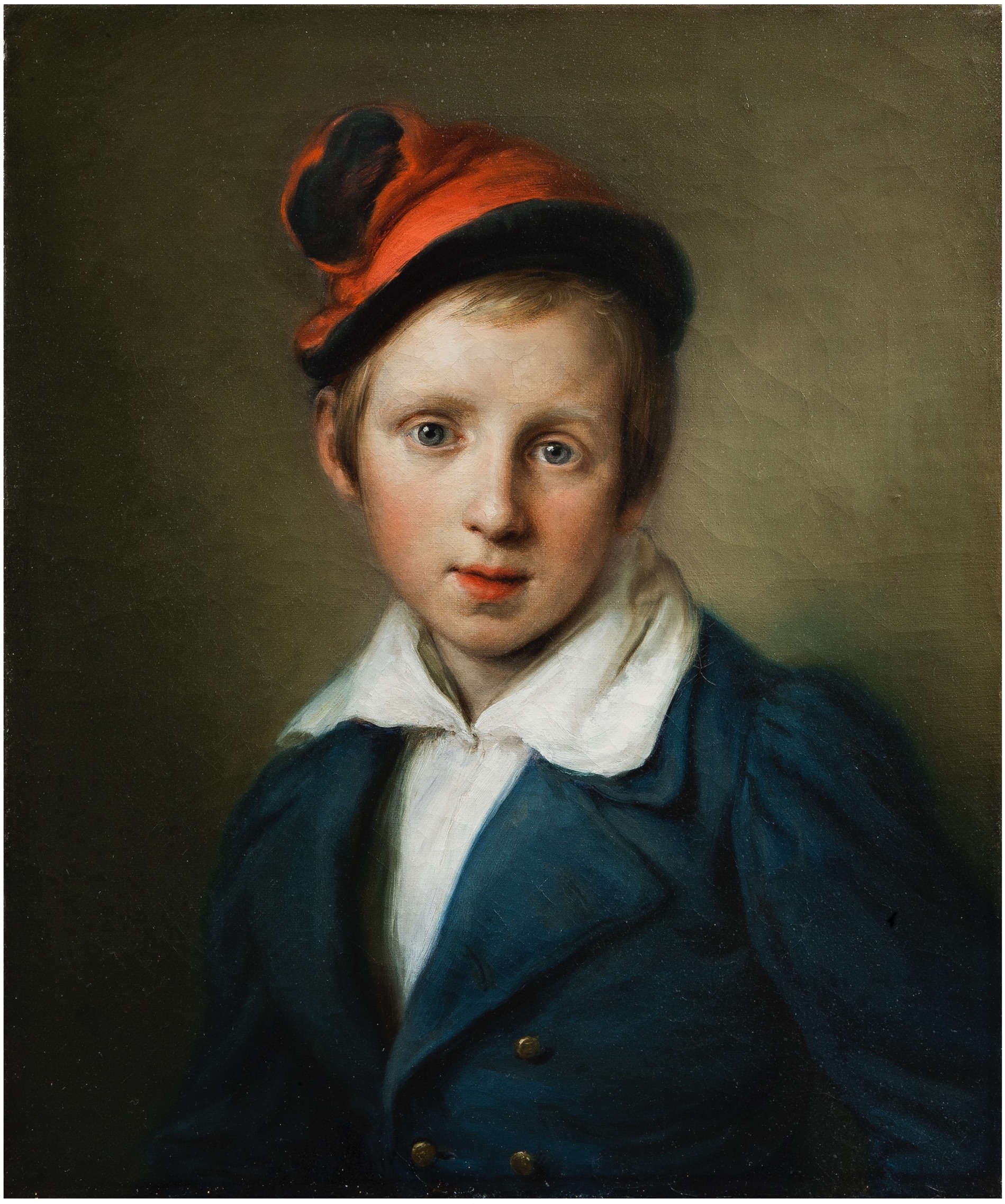
Portrait of a boy with a red cap, oil on canvas (1842-45)

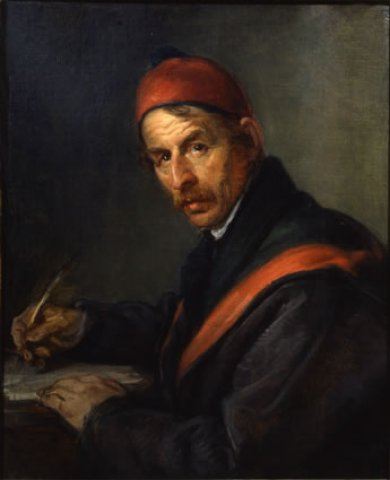
Portrait of a Man Writing, oil on canvas (c. 1843)

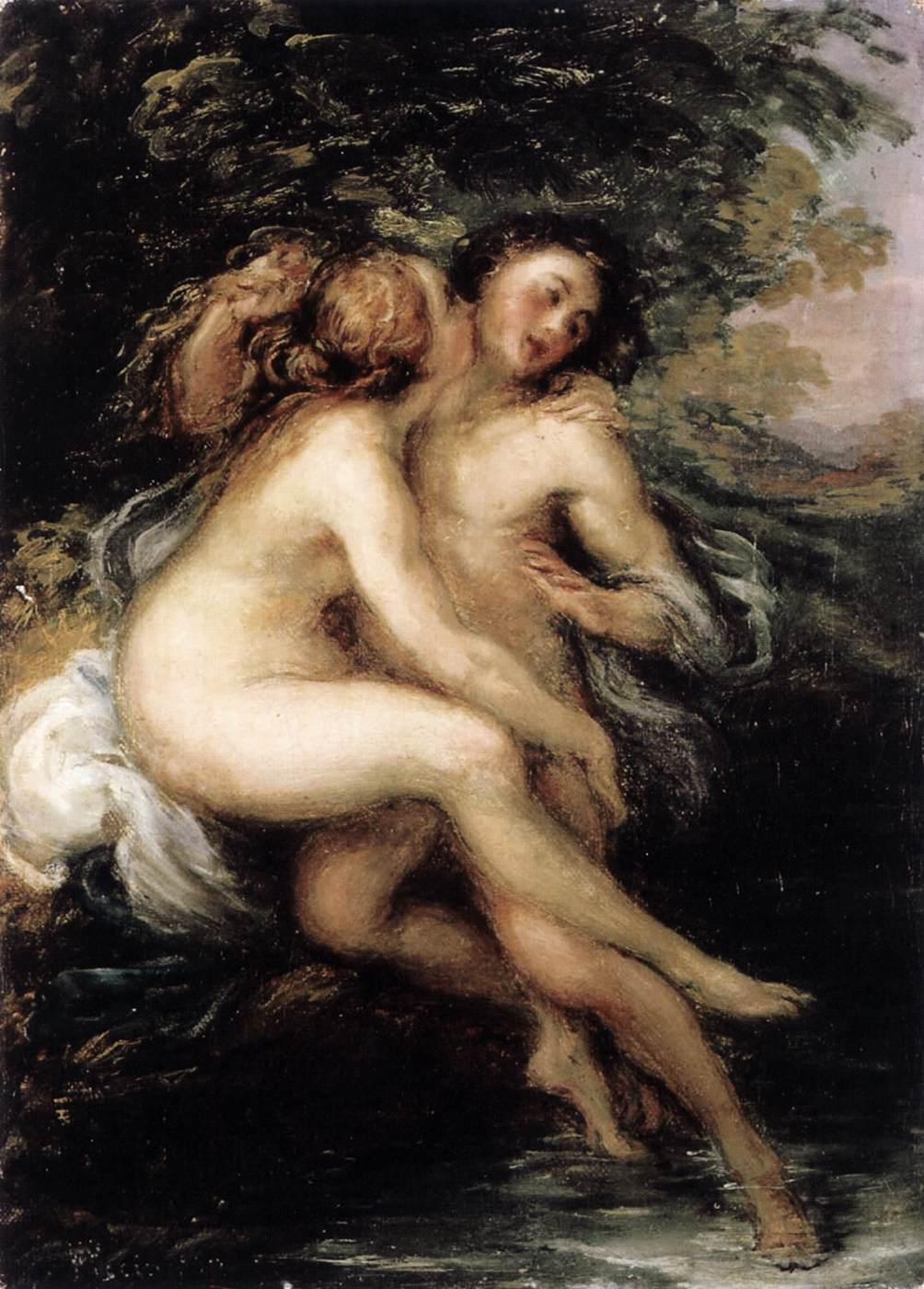
Salmacis and Hermaphroditus, oil on canvas (1856)

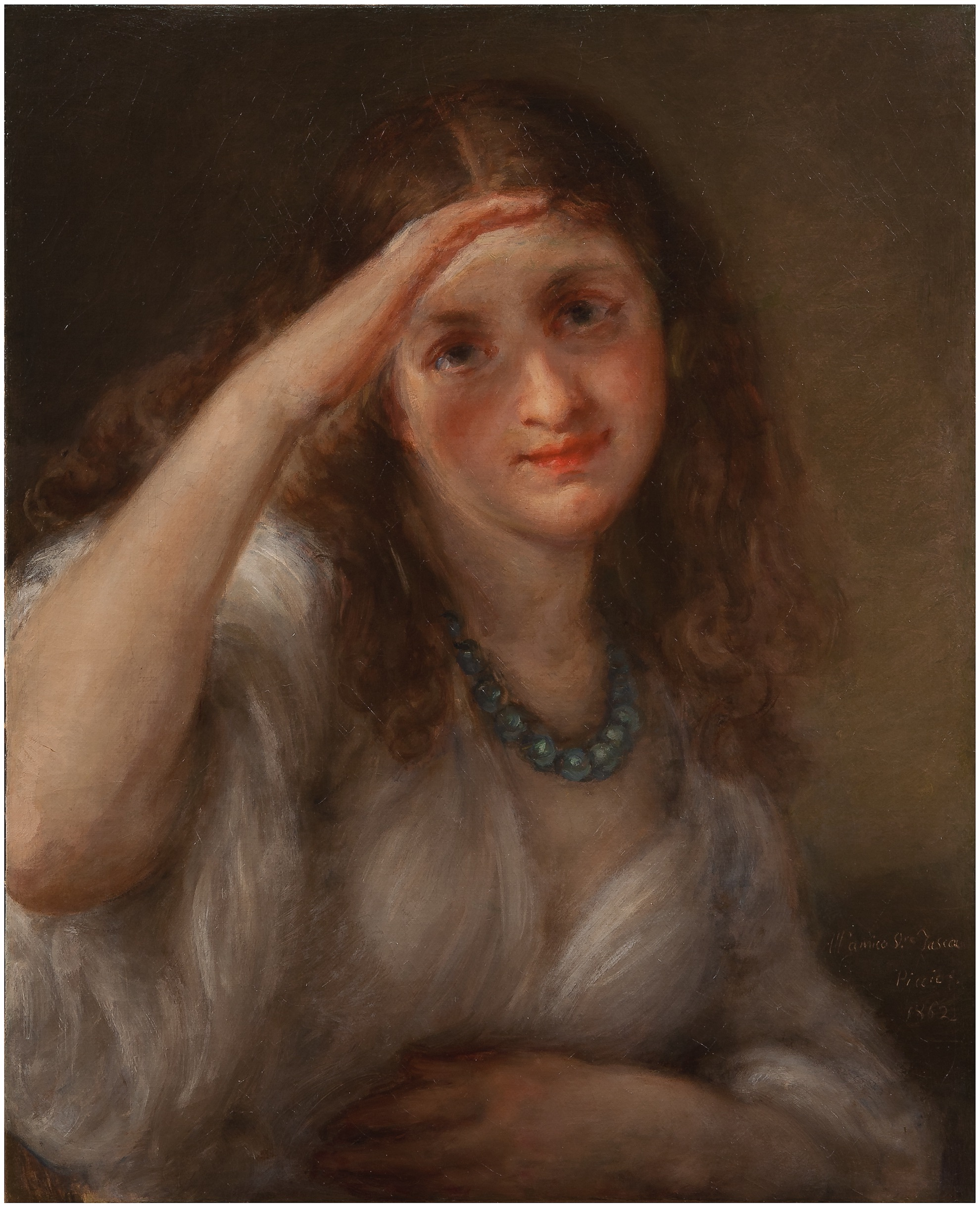
Portrait of Gina Caccia, oil on canvas (1862)

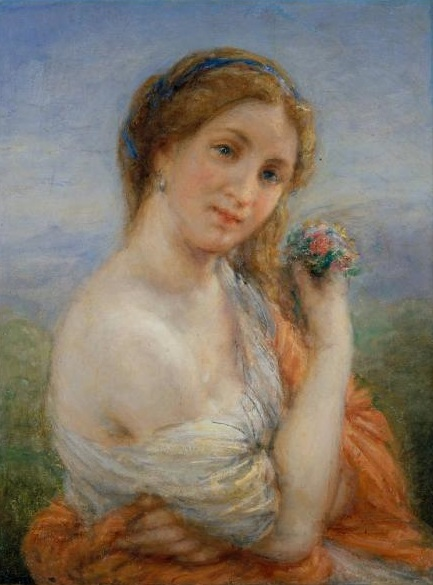
Flora, oil on canvas (1868)

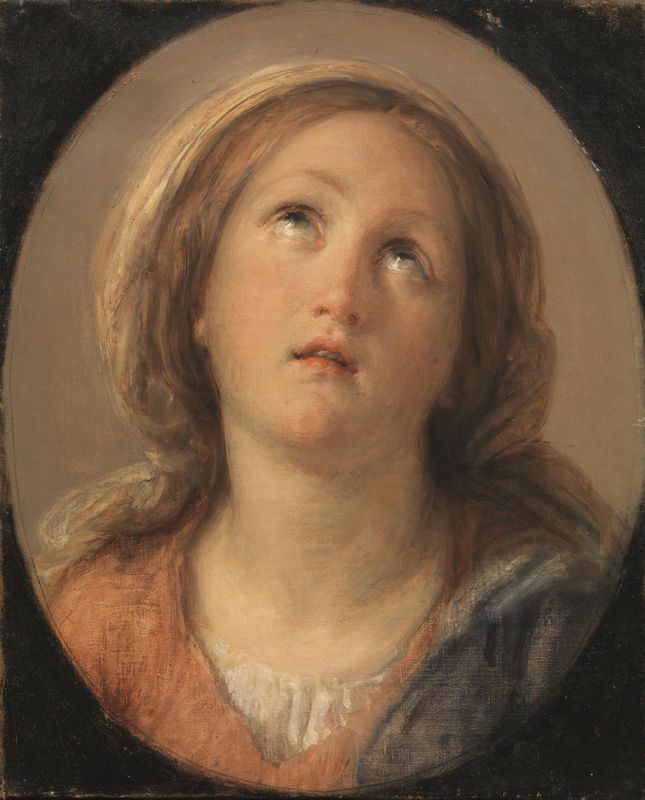
The Virgin Mary, oil on canvas (c. 1873)

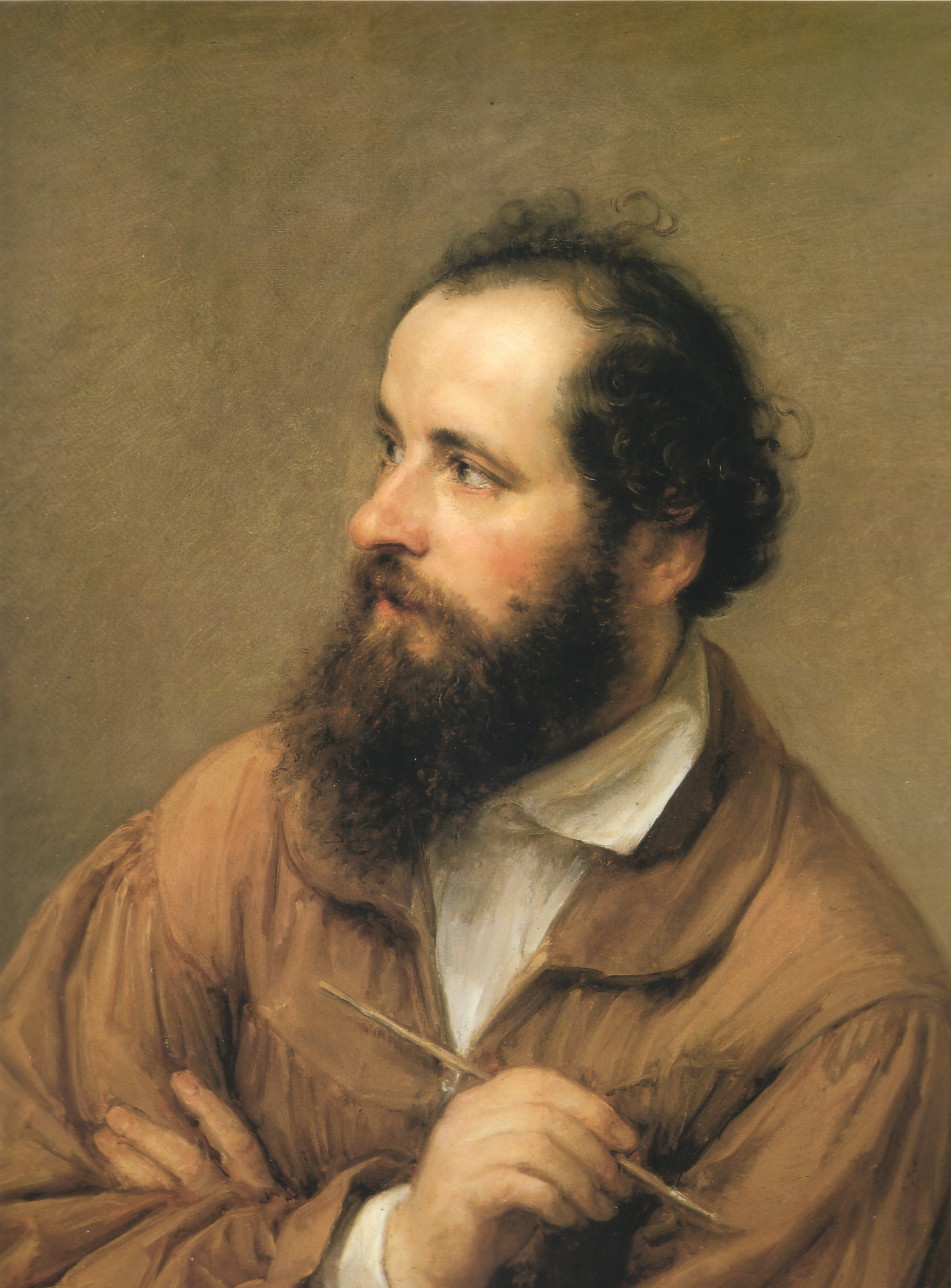
Portrait of Giacomo Trécourt, oil on canvas

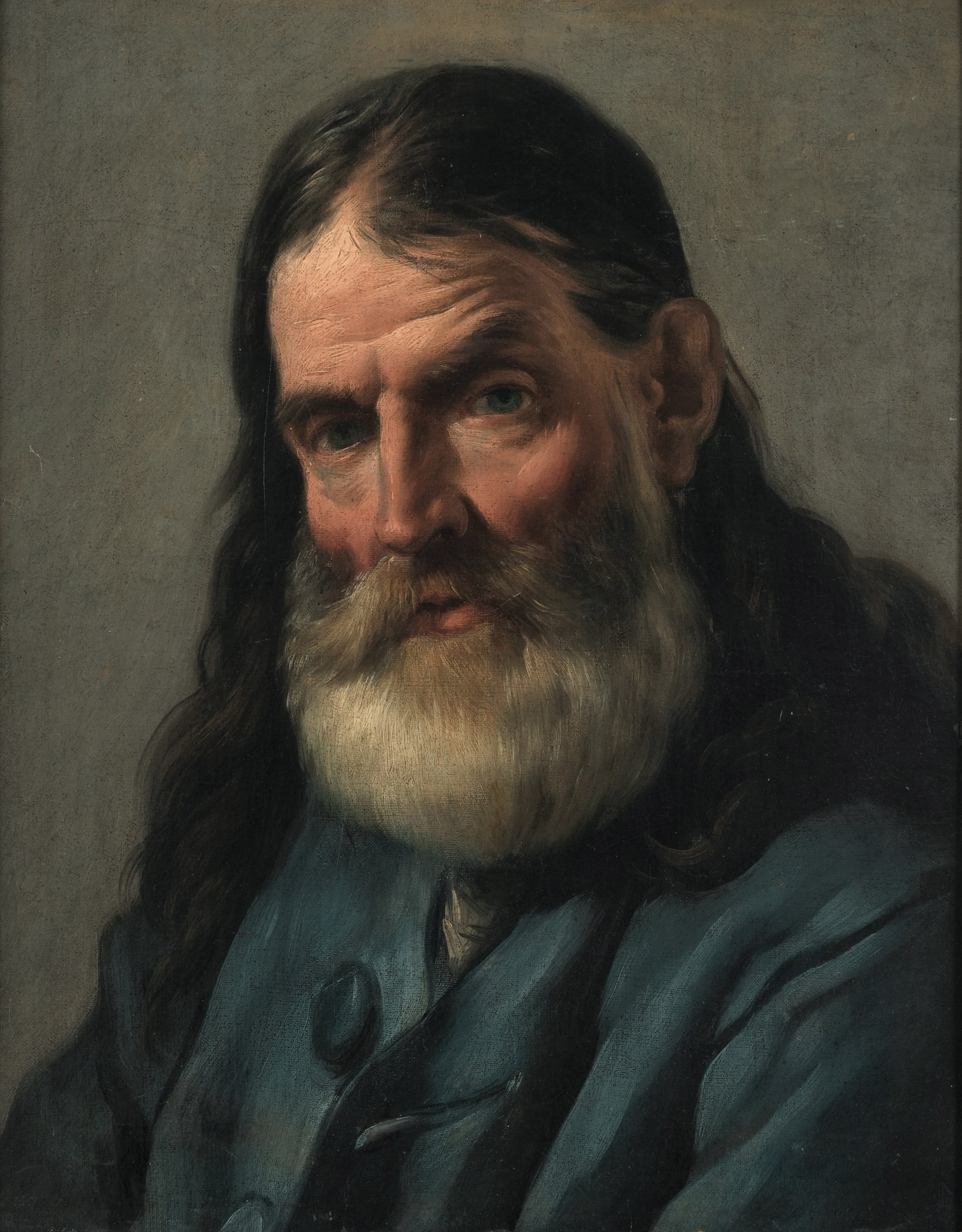
The Wayfarer, oil on canvas
