= Simone Mariani =

Italian-American actor, writer, director and producer

Simone Mariani is an Italian-American actor, writer, director and producer. He was born on April 2, 1964, in Rome, Italy. He appeared in the Hollywood film Inferno directed by Ron Howard and starring Tom Hanks.

His short films have been shown at national and international festivals including the Clermont-Ferrand International Short Film Festival. In 2006, he produced and acted in the short film Iram la Città Dalle Alte Colonne, an interpretation of a text by Kahlil Gibran. This film won a Critics' Award at the 2006 Arab Film Festival.

He is the author of The Juggler (2007), which was selected for a world tour by the IFCT Festival 2007 in Miami, Florida, United States.

In 2008 he debuted as a director for the short film The Artist, in which he also played the lead male role. He is the author, producer and performer in the short film The Father (2011). A Journey on the Tabla (2015) is his first documentary film.

He is a practitioner of Sunmudo— a martial art practiced by Korean Seon (Zen) monks.

== Filmography ==
=== Actor (partial) ===
- The Italian Dream
- Inferno
- Il commissario Rex (TV series)
- Distretto di polizia (TV series)
- Enrico Mattei: The Man who Looked to the Future (TV film)
- La contessa di Castiglione (TV film)
- Mafia Signs (TV film)
- Imperium: Saint Peter (TV film)
- De Gasperi, l'uomo della speranza (TV film)

=== Writer-director-producer (partial) ===
- A Journey on the Tabla (documentary)
- The Father (short)
- L'Artista (short)

== Film festivals ==
- The Juggler (2007), selected for world tour from IFCT Festival 2007 in Miami (USA)
- A Journey on the Tabla selected to screen in India

== Recognition ==
- Best Italian Documentary at Roma CineDoc for A Journey on the Tabla
- Critics Prize at Arab Film Festival 2006 for Iram, The City by the High Columns

== Jury member ==
- International Competition for Short Films & Student Short Films category at the All Lights India International Film Festival
