= Cavallini =

Cavallini is a surname. Notable people with the surname include:

- Ernesto Cavallini (1807 – 1874), Italian clarinetist
- Gino Cavallini (born 1962), Canadian ice hockey player
- Leonardo Cavallini (born 1939), Italian bobsledder
- Lucas Cavallini (born 1992), Canadian soccer player
- Paul Cavallini (born 1965), Canadian ice hockey player
- Pietro Cavallini (c. 1250 – c. 1330), Italian painter
