= Pathologica =

- Discipline: Pathology
- Language: Italian, English

Publication details
- History: Founded 1908
- Publisher: Società Anatomo Patologi Ospedalieri Italiani (Italy)
- Frequency: Bimonthly

Standard abbreviations
- ISO 4: Pathologica

Indexing
- ISSN: 0031-2983 (print); 1591-951X (web)
- OCLC no.: 1681013

Pathologica is an academic journal which covers the field of general and human pathology, including studies of pathological processes using immunocytochemistry and molecular biology. Founded in 1908, it was published on behalf of the Società Anatomo Patologi Ospedalieri Italiani by Springer-Verlag Milan until 2003, and is now published for the society by Ospedali Galliera di Genova. Pathologica is published bimonthly in Italian, with some recent content in English, and is indexed by Medline.
