= Piero Mariani (footballer) =

Italian footballer

Personal information
- Date of birth: December 4, 1911
- Place of birth: Mortata, Italy
- Height: 1.63 m (5 ft 4 in)
- Position: Midfielder

Senior career*
Years	Team	Apps	(Gls)
1928–1930	Novara	56	(14)
1930–1933	Ambrosiana-Inter	17	(4)
1933–1935	Vigevanese	61	(23)
1935–1940	Novara	118	(12)
1940–1941	Vigevano		
1941–1942	Lecco	23	(2)
- * Club domestic league appearances and goals

Piero Mariani (born December 4, 1911, in Mortata) was an Italian professional football player.
