= Nicola Pende =

Italian endocrinologist (1880–1970)

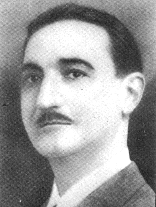
Nicola Pende

Nicola Pende (April 21, 1880, in Noicattaro – June 8, 1970, in Rome) was an Italian endocrinologist.

== Biography ==
He was born on April 21, 1880, in Noicattaro, in the ancient Via Garibaldi where he lived with his family during his whole childhood. After receiving his degree in Medicine and Surgery in Rome, he taught at university in Bari, Genoa, and Rome. In 1925, he founded the University of Bari and became its first chancellor. He gave birth to the modern new-ippocratism.

In 1934 he was appointed Reign Senator after declining the nomination of Academy of Italy. At the end of the thirties he joined fascism. He died on June 6, 1970, in Rome and is now buried at Campo Verano cemetery.
