= Pavia Civic Museums =

Art museum and Historic site in Pavia, Italy

Civic Museums of Pavia
- Musei Civici di Pavia
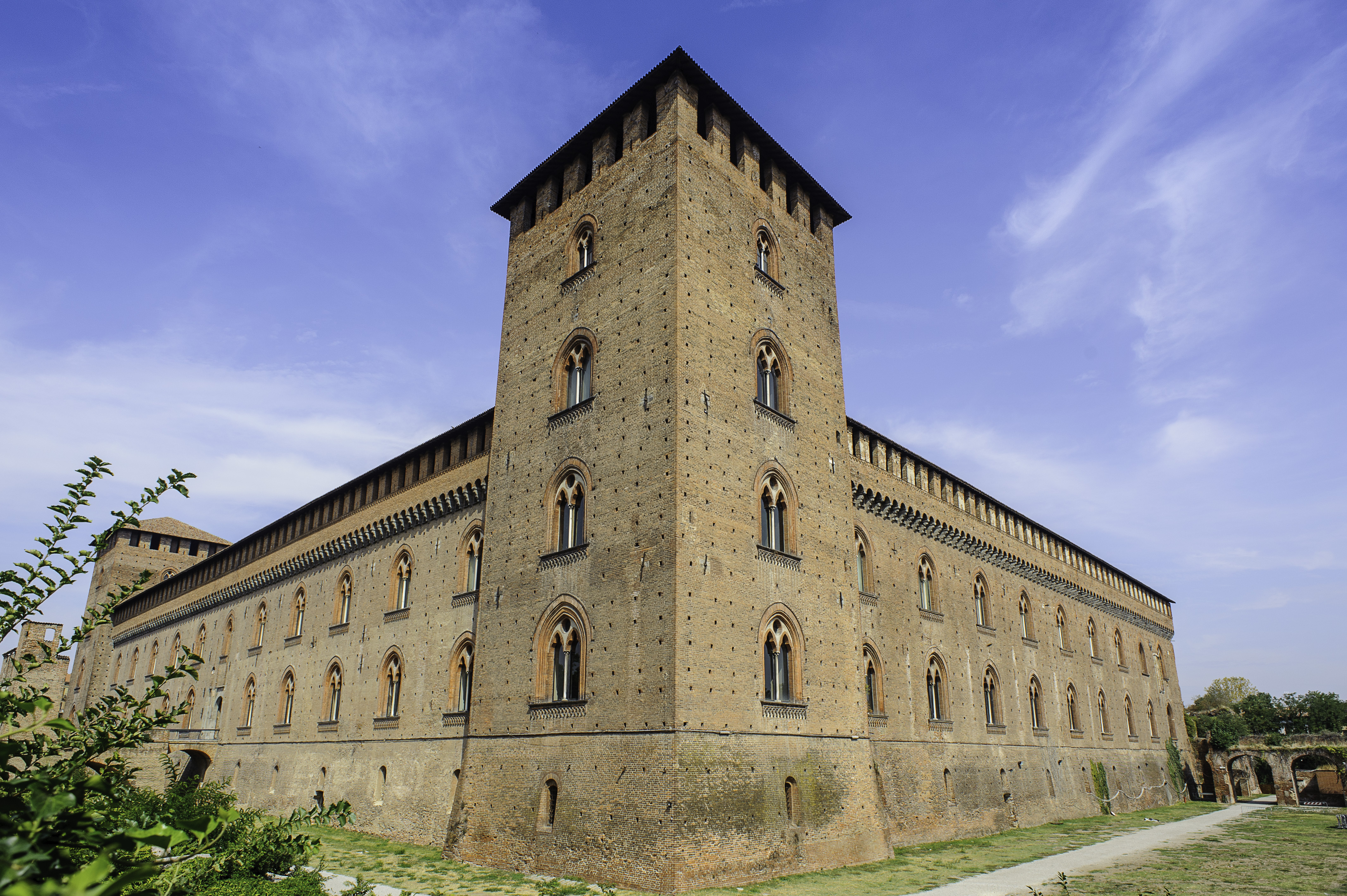
- The Visconti Castle, seat of the museums
- Location: Viale XI Febbraio 35, 27100, Pavia PV, Italy
- Coordinates: 45°11′24″N 9°09′30″E
- Type: Art museum and Historic site
- Public transit access: Pavia railway station
- Website: www.museicivici.pavia.it

The Civic Museums of Pavia (Italian: Musei Civici di Pavia) are a number of museums in Pavia, Lombardy, northern Italy. They are housed in the Visconti Castle (Castello Visconteo), built in 1360 by Galeazzo II Visconti, soon after taking the city, a free city-state until then. The credited architect is Bartolino da Novara. The castle used to be the main residence of the Visconti family, while the political capital of the state was Milan. North of the castle a wide park was enclosed, also including the Certosa of Pavia, founded 1396 according to a vow of Gian Galeazzo Visconti, meant to be a sort of private chapel of the Visconti dynasty. The Battle of Pavia (1525), climax of the Italian Wars, took place inside the castle park.

The Civic Museums of Pavia include the Pinacoteca Malaspina, Museo Archeologico and Sala Longobarda, Sezioni Medioevale e Rinascimentale Quadreria dell’800 (Collezione Morone), Museo del Risorgimento, Museo Robecchi Bricchetti, and the Cripta di Sant’Eusebio.

== History ==
The museum was built by the will of the Marquis Luigi Malaspina di Sannazzaro, an enlightened artist (1754/1835), who donated his art collections to the municipality on his death. The collection, which over time was enriched by numerous donations, was initially housed in the Malaspina Palace and was moved to the castle only in 1951.

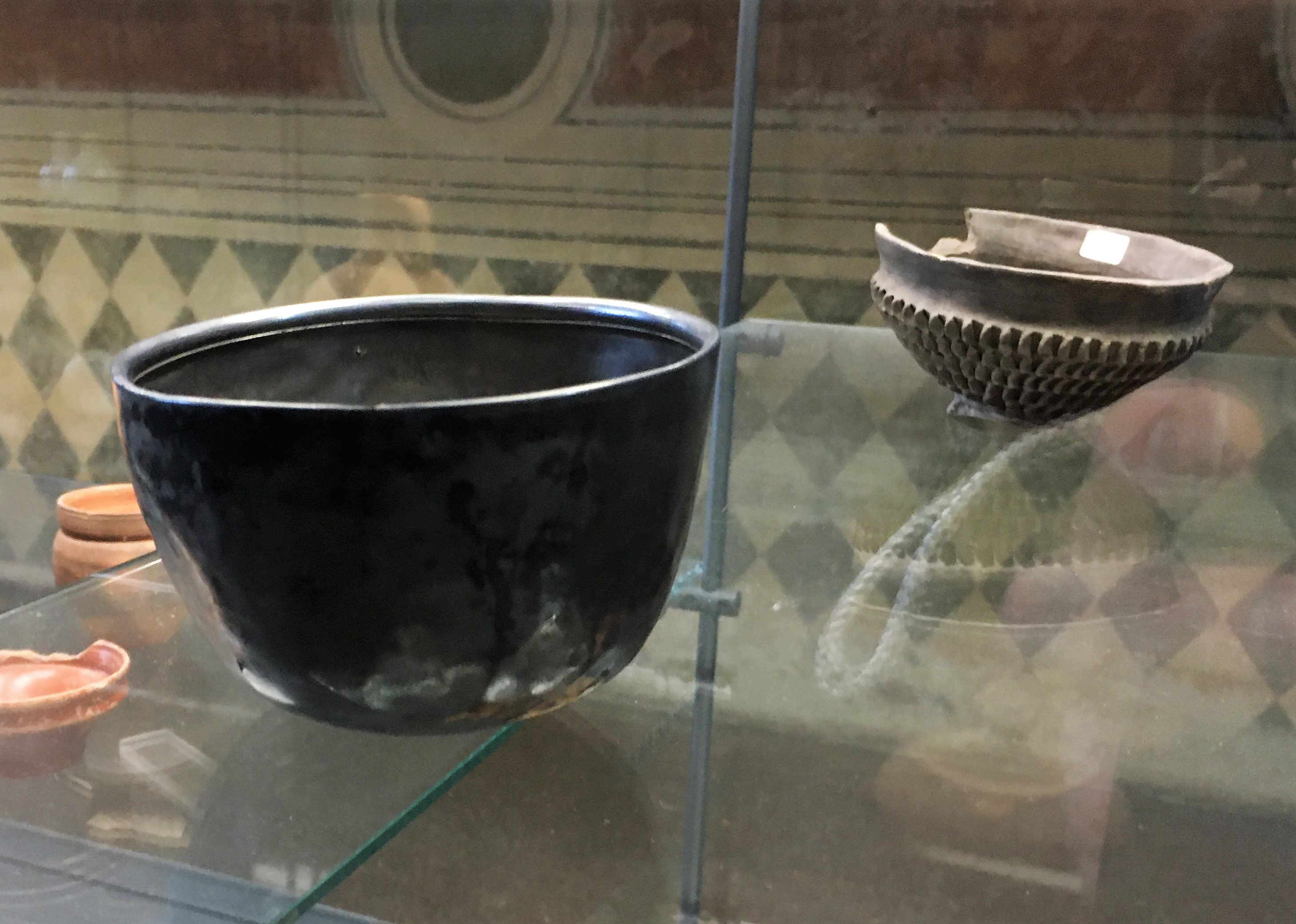
Celtic silver cup from Zerbo, 2nd century BC

== Collections ==
The archaeological collection includes materials found by chance during agricultural or building works; the museum has come mainly from private collecting (Giuletti, Reale collection, etc.). The arcades on the ground floor of the castle house the Lapidarium made up of stelae, sarcophagi, funerary and votive altars, epigraphs, capitals, colonnems and Roman milestones. Among the locally sourced pieces, particular mention should be made of those made from Egyptian granite and Proconnesian marble, which were discovered in Corteolona (curtis Ollone), the site of the palace of the Lombard king Liutprand. They are part of a collection of artifacts brought from Rome, likely in 729, following Liutprand’s visit to Pope Gregory II. During this journey, the king had venerated the relics of Saint Anastasius and, upon his return, dedicated the church and monastery within the royal palace at Corteolona to the saint.

Along the south side of the portico, several sarcophagi from the Roman period are displayed, nearly all made of granite from the Alps. Each consists of two separate elements: the lid and the chest. In the Middle Ages, sarcophagi were often reused, both as everyday objects (such as basins, animal troughs, or containers) and for the burial of prominent individuals or saints. In such cases, the original Roman inscription was often removed, altered, or replaced with a more recent one.

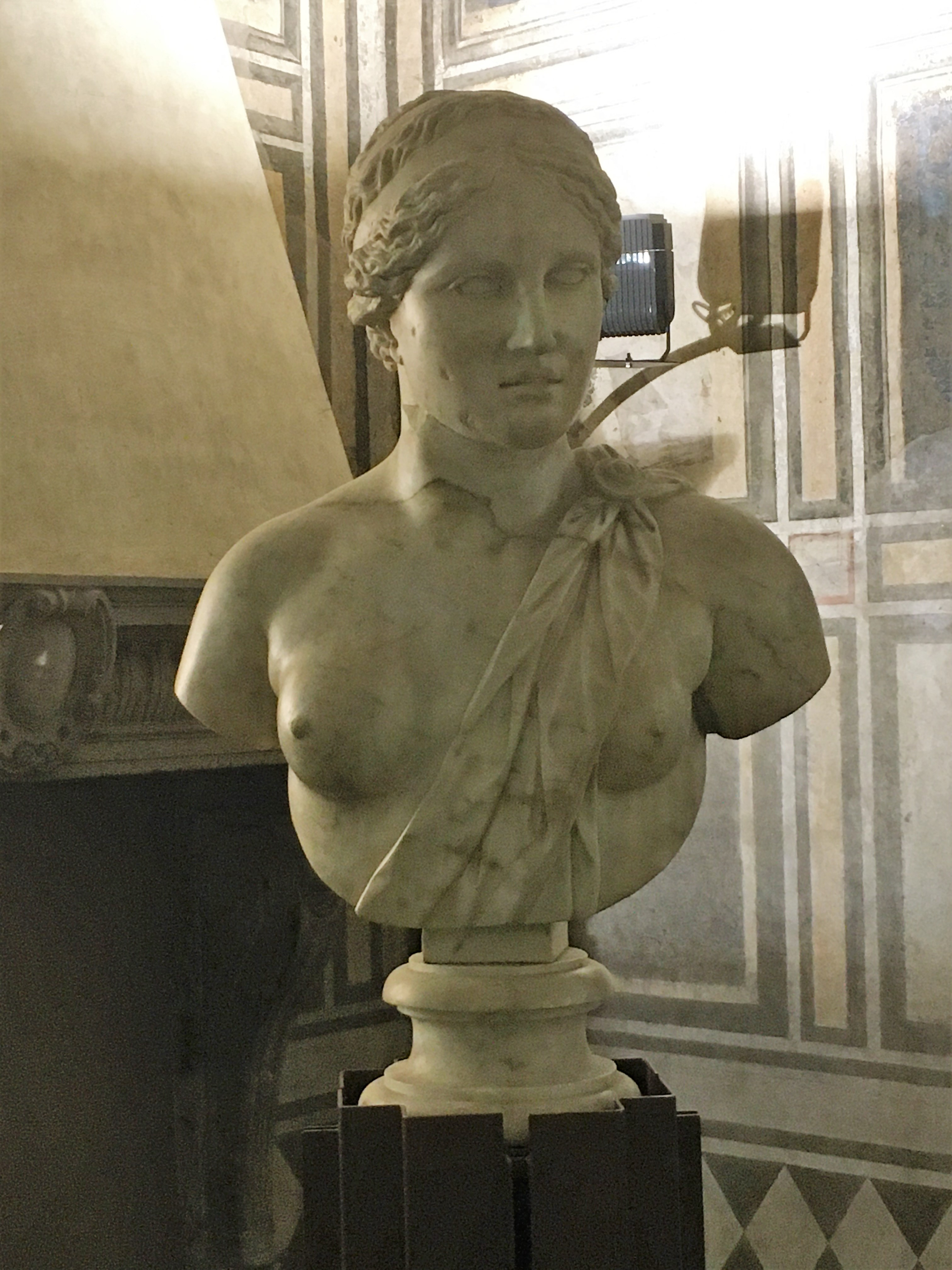
Bust of Artemis Soteira of Cephisodotus the Elder, Roman copy of the 1st-2nd century CE

=== Archaeological Museum and Longobard Room ===
The first room is dedicated to the territory of Ticinum (this was the ancient name of Pavia) in Roman times and, among other finds, it exhibits a sepulchral area, made up of brick cremation tombs and a sepulchral stone, of the 1st century A.D. found in Casteggio. The room also houses the finds from the Celtic necropolis found in 1957 in Santa Cristina e Bissone, whose grave goods date back to the 2nd century B.C. they are characterized by the presence of stylistically traditional celtic objects combined with typically Roman products, such as black-glazed Ware. Not otherwise, the grave goods from the 1st century B.C. tomb found in Pavia it is at the same time Celtic (in the ceramics and brooches) and Roman (in the brick elements of the box and in the clay unguentarium). These are evidence of the progressive penetration of Roman culture into the Celtic Cisalpine world. Also from the same period dates back to a piece of great interest: a silver cup which on the rim bears an inscription formed by a Ligurian name followed by an indication of Roman weight measurements found near Zerbo in a group of "Gallo-Roman" tombs cremation and dated to the 2nd century B.C.

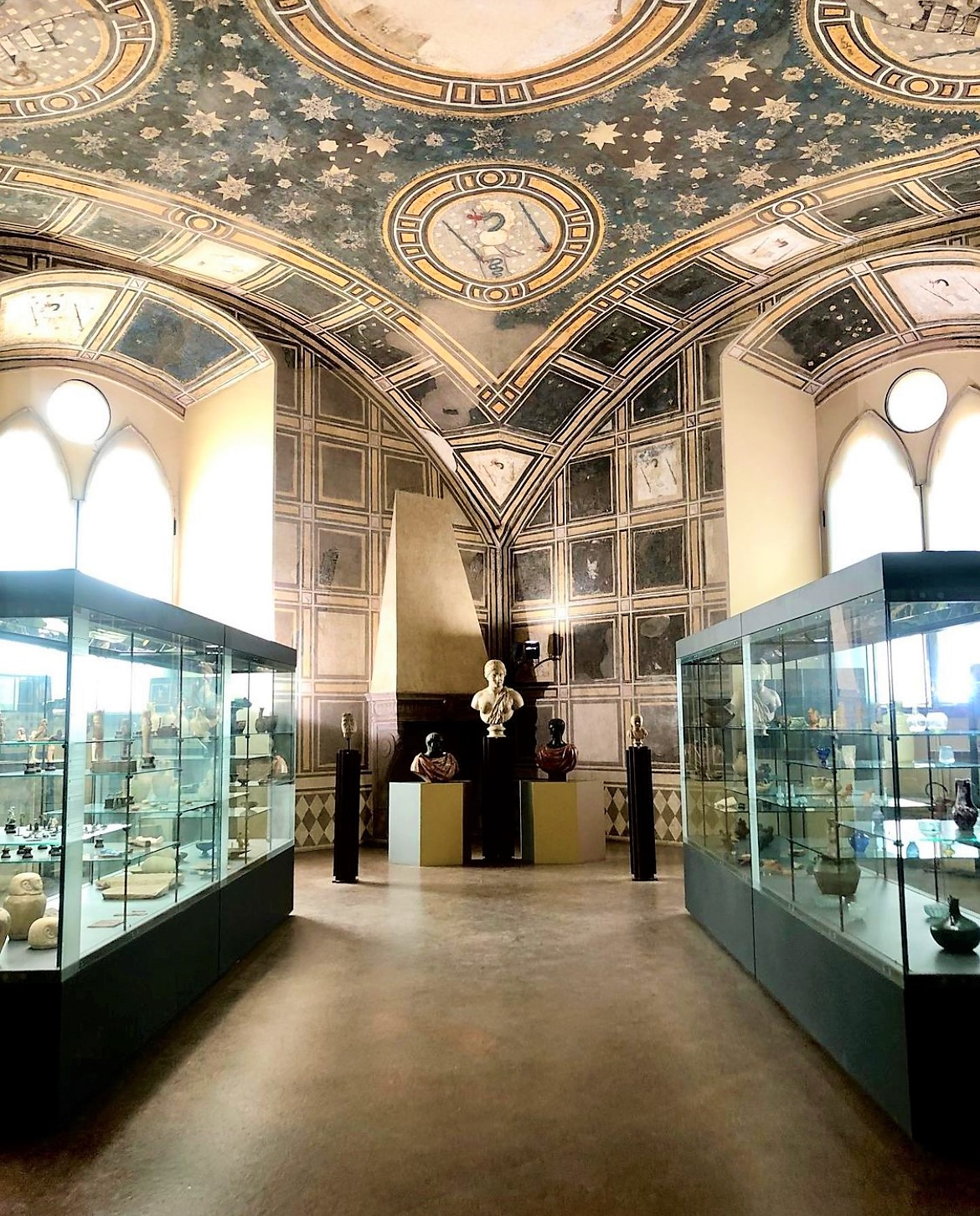
The blue room with the Egyptian collection

In the second room is exhibited the Egyptian collection, donated by the Marquis Malaspina di Sannazzaro (who bought it from Giuseppe Nizzoli, chancellor of the Austrian consulate in Alexandria between 1818 and 1828), consisting of about 150 artifacts. The Egyptian collection is not the only section of the museum containing materials not coming from the Pavia area: we only remember the collection of Phoenician-Punic ceramics (rarely found in Italian museums outside Sardinia) left by Francesco Reale in 1892 or the collection of Italiot and Greek vases that came to the museum through 19th-century Pavese collectors.

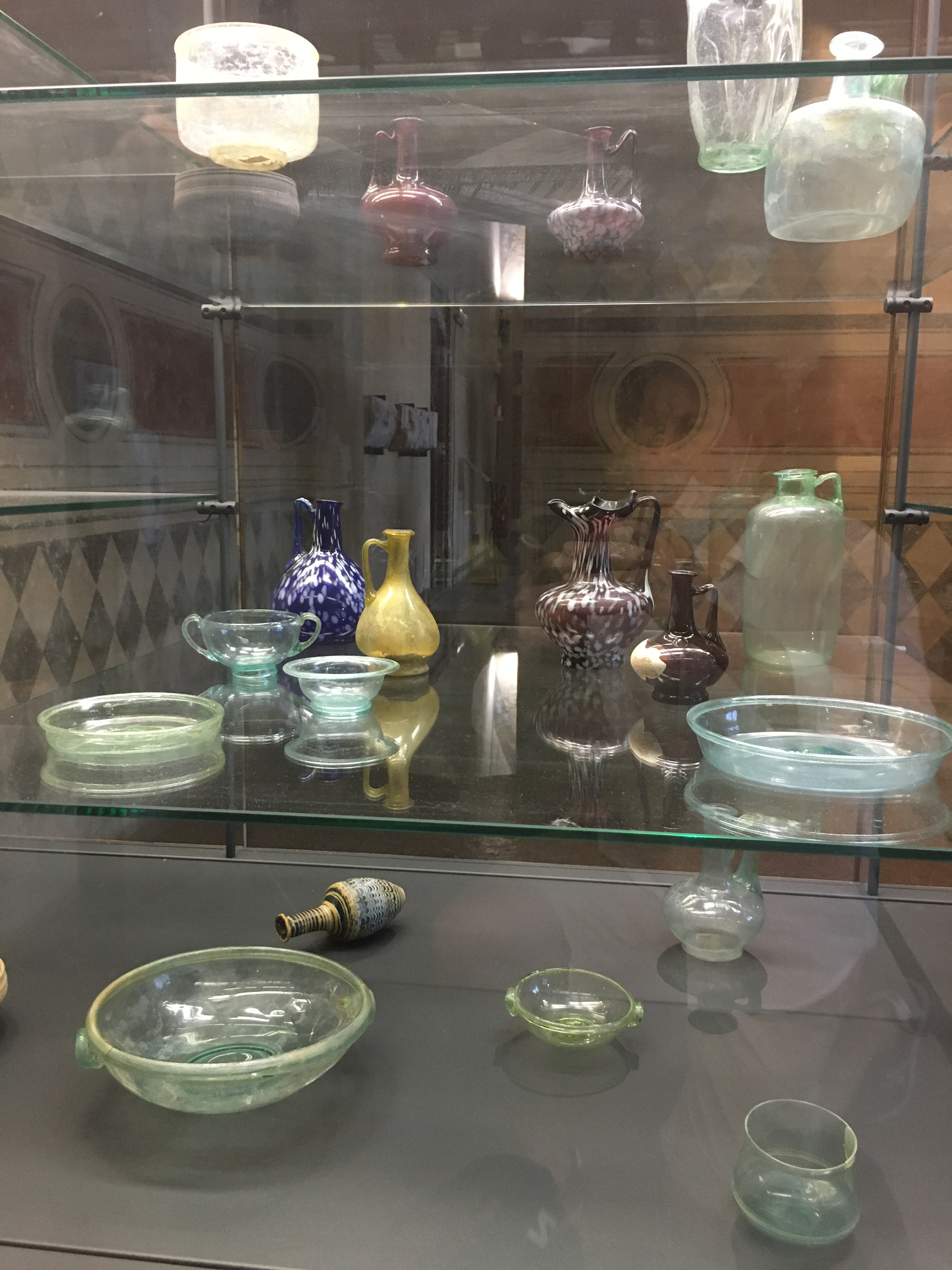
Some of the Roman glass

Also in the same room is the collection of Roman glass, probably the most important in northern Italy, in which there are pieces of the highest quality and rarity, such as the dark blue glass kantharos from Frascarolo and the cup of Ennion. the Roman glass in the museum stands out for its quality and typological variety. In the collection, ascribable in the majority of the pieces to the 1st and 2nd century AD, the most diverse processing techniques are testified

Tombstone of Boethius, 6th Century.

Next to the glass, there are some sculptures from the Roman age found in the city and in its territory, among which a Greek marble bust depicting Artemis Soteira of Cephisodotus the Elder, a Roman copy of the 1st-2nd century AD stands out. The III and IV rooms exhibit Roman remains found in Pavia: ceramics, bronzes, terra sigillata, fine table ceramics, other Roman glass and large architectural and sculptural finds, including the statue of a man with a toga, known as name of Muto from the hilt to the neck, dating back to the 1st-2nd century AD. and coming from the western gate of the city (Porta Marenga). Among the sculptures of the Roman age there is also a female portrait, in Greek marble representing a woman of mature age with deeply sunken eyes and hats gathered on the nape of the neck, evidence of the "cultured" sculpture of Pavia of the III century. Also from a sepulchral monument comes a marble stone with the image of Attis, dating back to the 1st century AD. There are Celtic finds from the La Tène period and glazed pottery from the 1st century AD, also in the shape of a bird.

Ostrogothic belt buckle

Always linked to the events of Pavia and its territory is the Longobard Room, where paleochristian silverware is exhibited (including a liturgical spoon, a bowl and a chalice knot found between the presbytery and the side aisle of the basilica of San Michele Maggiore in 1968), late Roman and Ostrogothic jewellery (including some notable stirrup fibulae) and finds from the Lombard period (including a rare Lombard age bronze statue representing a warrior), evidence of the importance and splendor of Pavia, then the capital of the kingdom. There are many finds of great interest (including historical ones) preserved: the front of a sarcophagus from the 2nd century AD. it contains an epigraph commemorating the work of the Gothic king Atalaric at the amphitheater of Pavia between 528 and 529. At the same time there is also a funerary epigraph in marble and written in Greek by a Syriac family, coming from the church of San Giovanni in Borgo and some fragments of tiles bearing the bishop Crispinus II (521- 541) stamp, proof of the presence of kilns in the city even after the end of the Roman world.

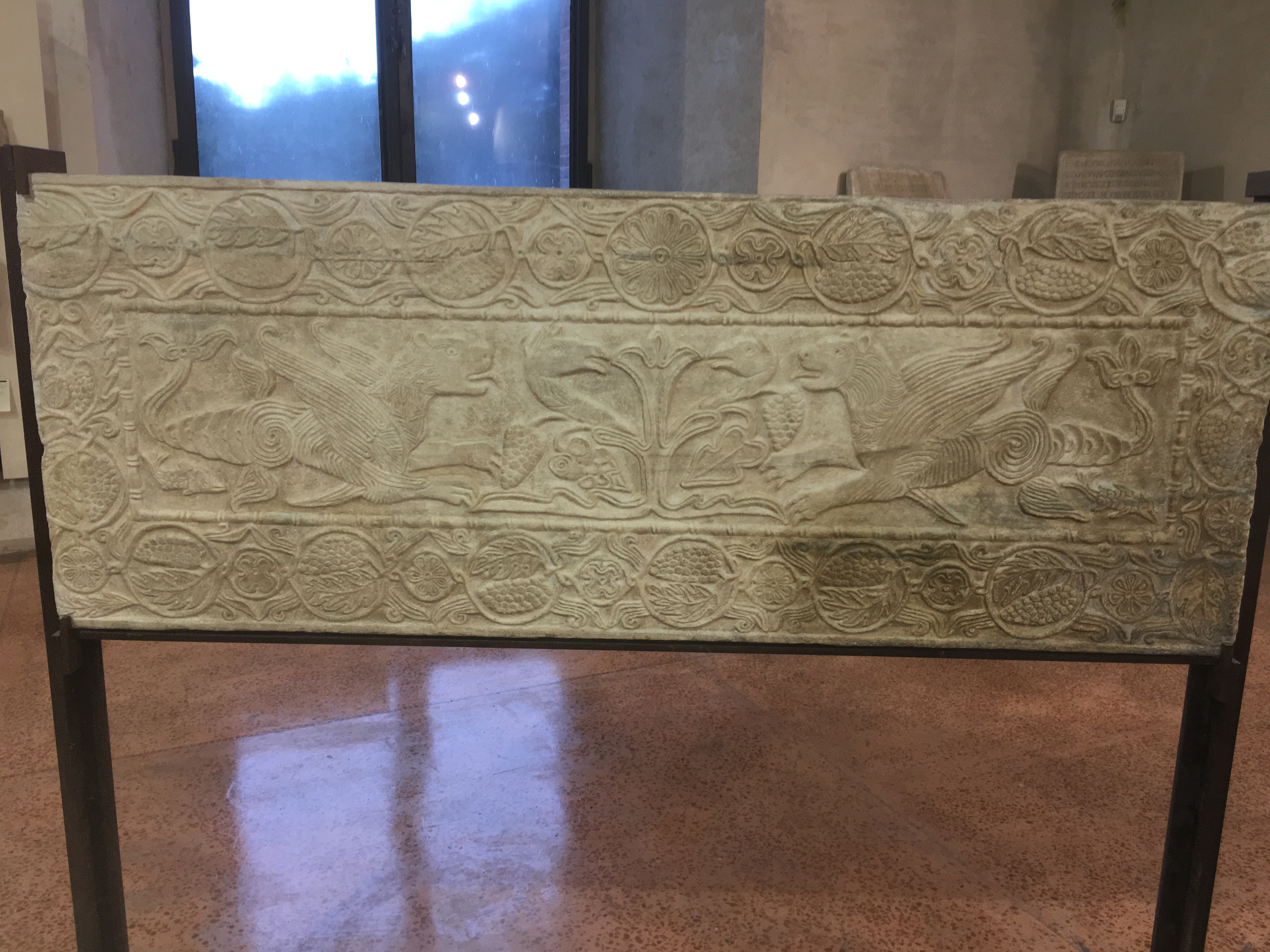
One of the plutei of Theodota, 8th century

In the room there is also the large marble tombstone, found in Villaregio in the nineteenth century, by the philosopher Severino Boethius (about 480 - 524 or 526), and the tombstones of King Cunipert, his daughter Cuniperga, Queen Ragintruda and Duke Audoald. Witnesses of Lombard sculpture at the time of King Liutprand are the well-known plutei of Theodota, which depict the tree of life between winged dragons and a chalice flanked by peacocks, and the fragment of pluteus with a lamb's head from the former Royal Palace of Corteolona, while always linked to the royal past of Pavia is the inscription of the sarcophagus of Queen Ada (wife of King Hugh of Italy, who died in 931 and buried in the church of San Gervasio and Protasio) and the sella plicatilis, a folding chair of Carolingian or Ottonian art in iron coated with silver and gilded copper, a rare specimen (very few European museums retain furnishings from that era and almost none of them reach the quality of the Pavia specimen) due to its technical complexity and refined decoration.

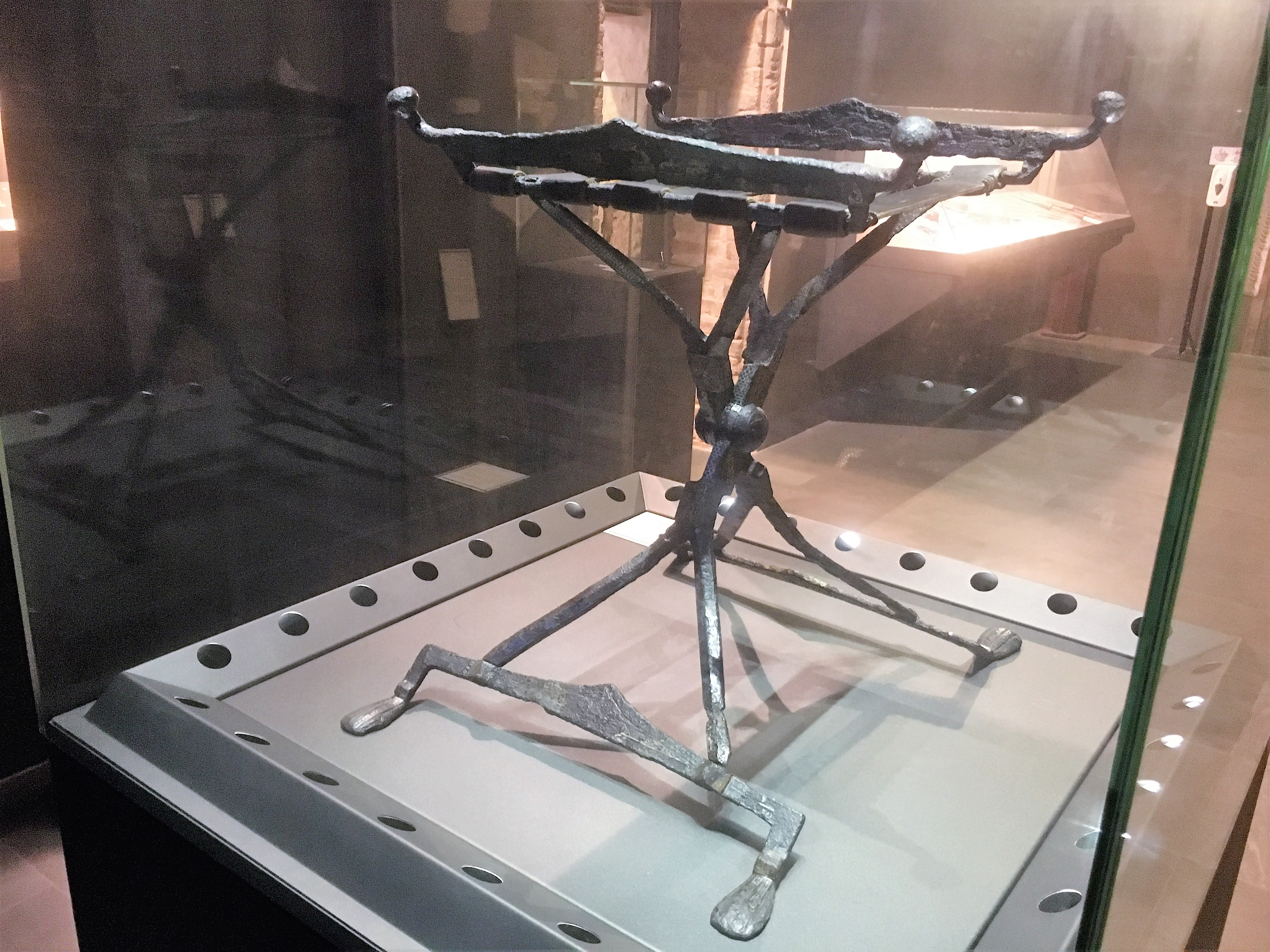
Sella Plicatilis, folding chair, 9th -10th century

=== Romanesque and Renaissance section ===
The artistic and architectural evolution of the city is represented in the rooms ranging from the 7th to the 14th, where Romanesque, Gothic and Renaissance sculptural and architectural finds are preserved, in particular the Romanesque section is probably one of the largest in northern Italy. Many of them come from buildings destroyed during the nineteenth century, such as those from the churches of Santa Maria del Popolo and Santo Stefano (from the twelfth century and demolished during the nineteenth century to make room for the Cathedral). In particular, the monumental portals of the two churches (room VIII and X), numerous capitals and a portion of the wall with white, green and blue glazed bricks from Santa Maria del Popolo (11th Century) are exhibited, among the oldest Italian (and European) examples of majolica.

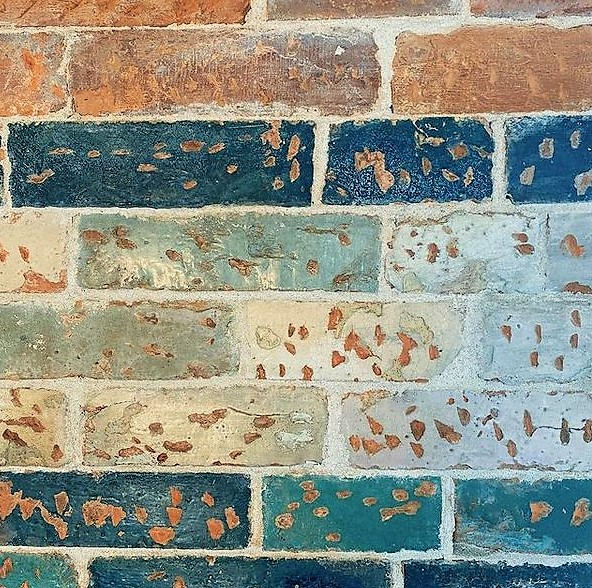
Glazed bricks from Santa Maria del Popolo, 11th century

Also from Santa Maria del Popolo also come some capitals (11th and 12th century) that reflect the decorations and the shape of the Corinthian capitals of the classical age and a capital represented and seven figures that hold the character in the center, while the last of the series respectively carry a cross and a knife.

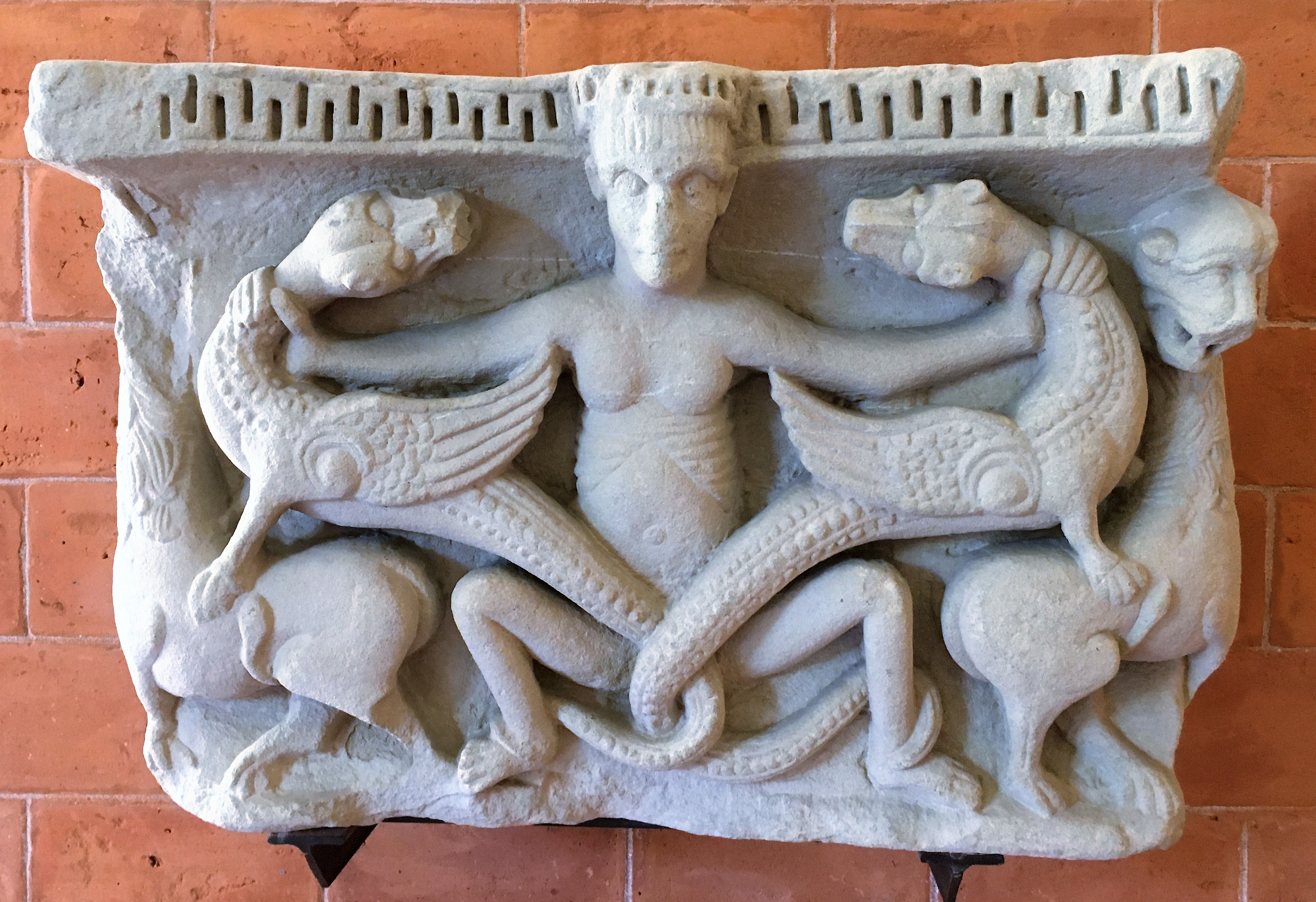
Capital of the Master of Dragons, 12th century.

The most important Romanesque sculptures are also kept in the tenth room: those from the church of San Giovanni in Borgo (also demolished in the nineteenth century to enlarge the garden of the Borromeo College), among which we remember a capital with dragons and telamon and a capital with dragons bitten by masks, the work of the so-called Master of Dragons, all dating back to the early decades of the 12th century.

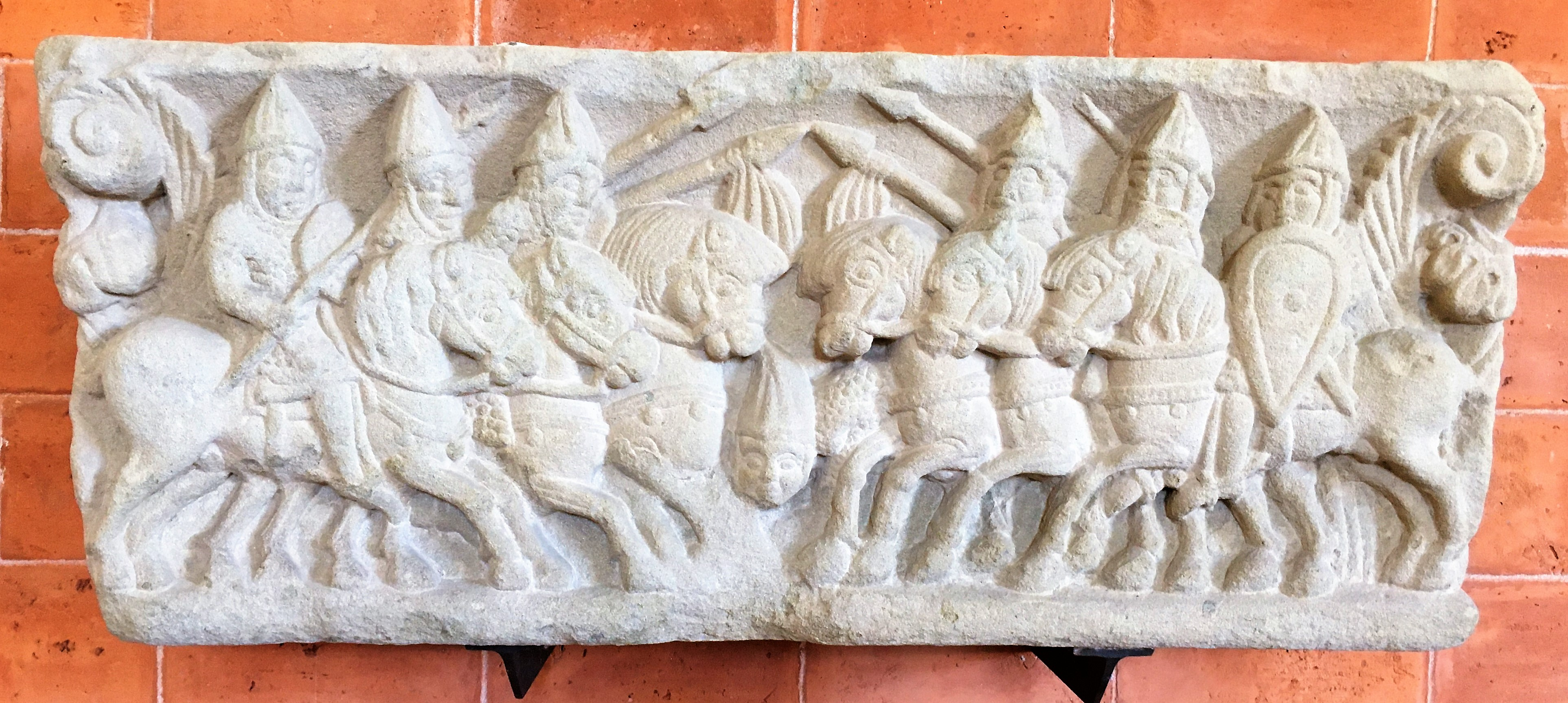
Capital with battle scene, first half of the 12th century

Of particular interest are the numerous dishes on display, all important products from the Islamic and Byzantine East, which adorned the facades of churches and buildings (many are still found on the facades of Romanesque churches in Pavia, so much so that Pavia, after Pisa and Rome is the Italian city that retains the largest number). These were very expensive and valuable products and were made with techniques then unknown in the West.

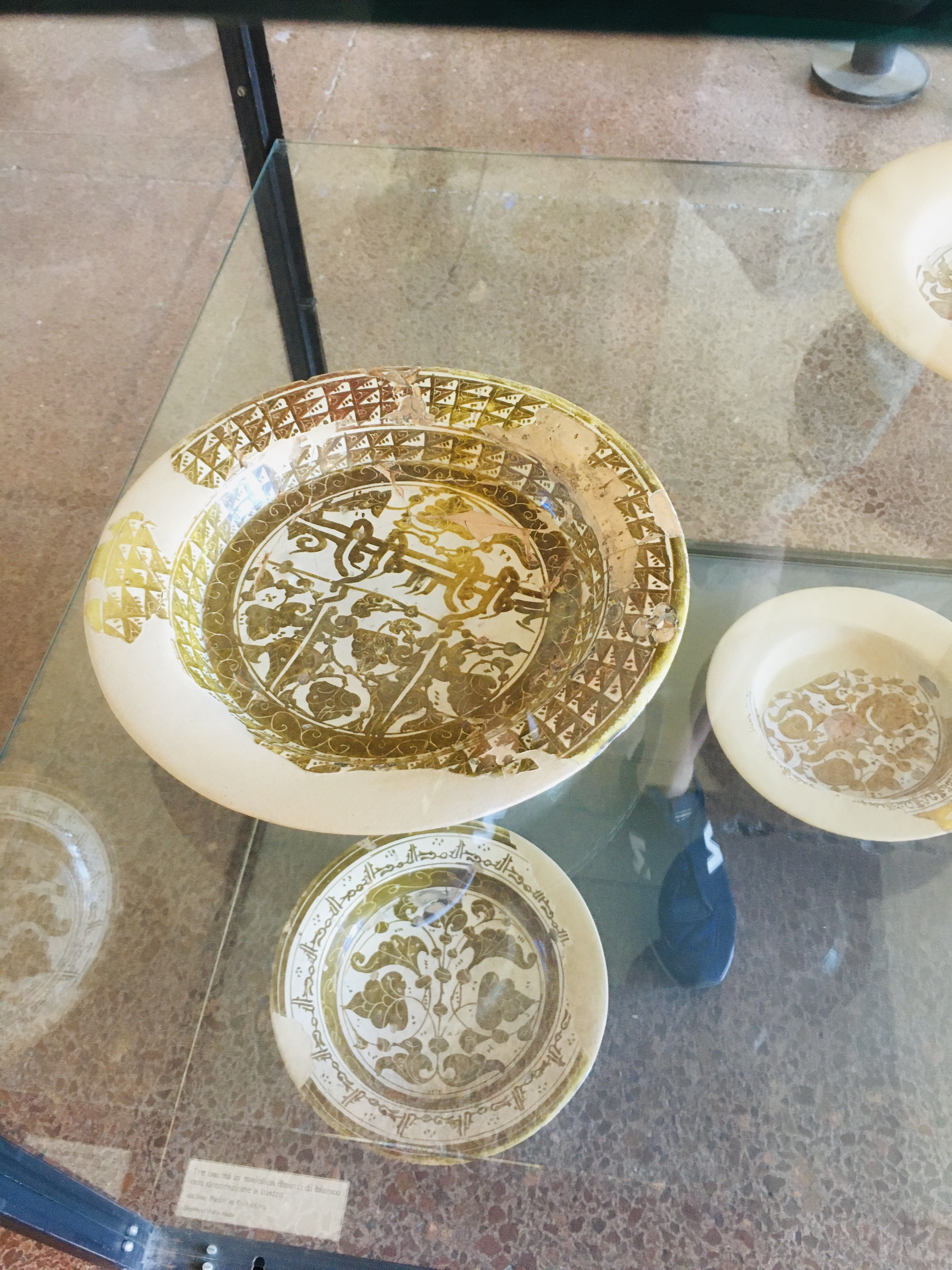
Some of the Islamic dishes, 11th and 12th century

Also of oriental origin are other contemporary finds, such as an 11th-century Islamic coffin in embossed foil (coming from Dagestan) from the church of San Teodoro. Along with the sculptural finds, some Romanesque mosaics (12th century) from the churches of Santa Maria del Popolo, Sant'Invenzio and Santa Maria delle Stuoie (the wheel of the months) are preserved in the 11th room. The mosaics of Santa Maria del Popolo were found in successive phases in the demolitions of 1854 and 1936. The floor mosaic of the central nave adapts the theme of a large wheel included within a frame bordered by ribbon, herringbone and, laterally, with geometric motifs. The struggle between Faith and Discord is depicted in the larger band, as indicated by the Latin captions that still mark the wolf and the crow. The mosaic of the right aisle instead depicts scenes of the martyrdom of Saint Eustace and is also notable for the iconographic rarity (the saint's passion is depicted in the capitals of the church of Vezelay in Burgundy, in the cloister of Monreale, but this one in Pavia would be the only mosaic example).

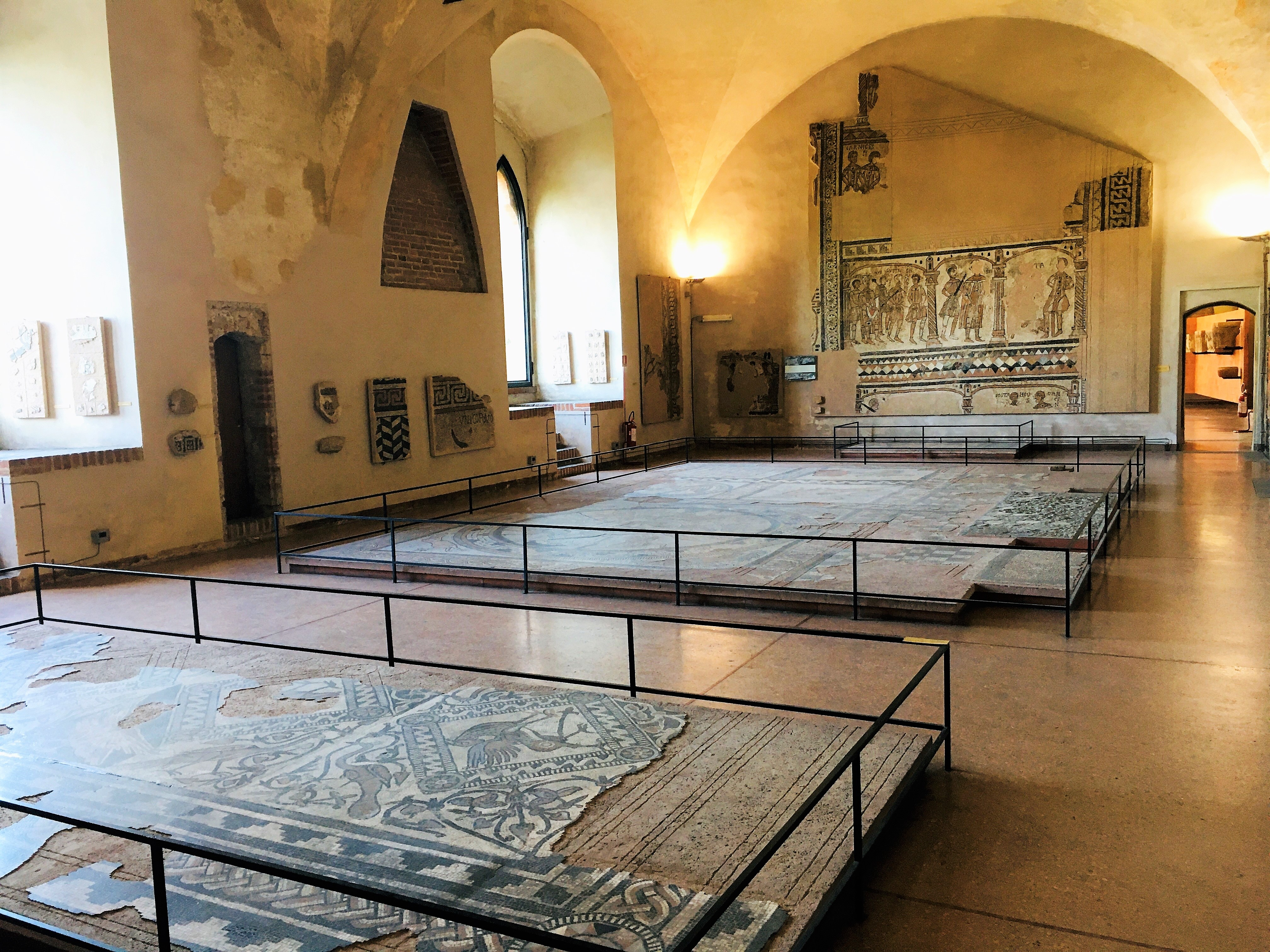
The room of Romanesque mosaics, 11th and 12th century

Of particular interest is a homogeneous series of capitals in red Verona marble decorated with foliage and heads, of fine workmanship and expression of Lombard late Gothic sculpture (late 14th century). The perpetual demolitions and demolitions of the urban building fabric have given the museum an impressive number of architectural terracottas; therefore the individual pieces are indicative of their relevance to string courses, windows, portals and, according to the style requirements, to a renewal that the city experienced above all in the Visconti and Sforza age, when alongside the large public buildings and noble palaces, even the small owners came updating their homes to the new taste. Beyond the possible restitution of some context, the same quality is a significant datum of a paleo-industrial production that the documented existence of kilns, starting from the first half of the fourteenth century, can assign to Pavia. The tombstone of Ardengo Folperti (minister of Filippo Maria Visconti who died in 1430), attributed to Jacopino da Tradate and the funerary epigraph of Francesco da Brossano (grandson of Francis Petrarch who died at an early age in Pavia, also date back to the same period. who was buried in the church of San Zeno). In particular, the Folperti slab must have constituted the lid of the sarcophagus of a more complex monument, while the epigraph of Francesco da Brossano is characterized by the refinement of the Gothic characters, elegantly engraved and gilded, accompanying the importance of the poetic text, in elegiac couplets, dictated by Petrarch himself. Rich is also the Renaissance Section which preserves works of art from the Certosa construction site (in particular many terracotta sculptures) and sculptural testimonies attributed to the school of Giovanni Antonio Amadeo and Cristoforo and Antonio Mantegazza, active in the decoration of the Certosa facade: including the panel with the Annunciation from the monastery of San Salvatore, with evident Bramante influences, and the aedicule with the Pietà, once stuck in the outer wall of the San Matteo Hospital or the telamon bust attributed to Annibale Fontana.

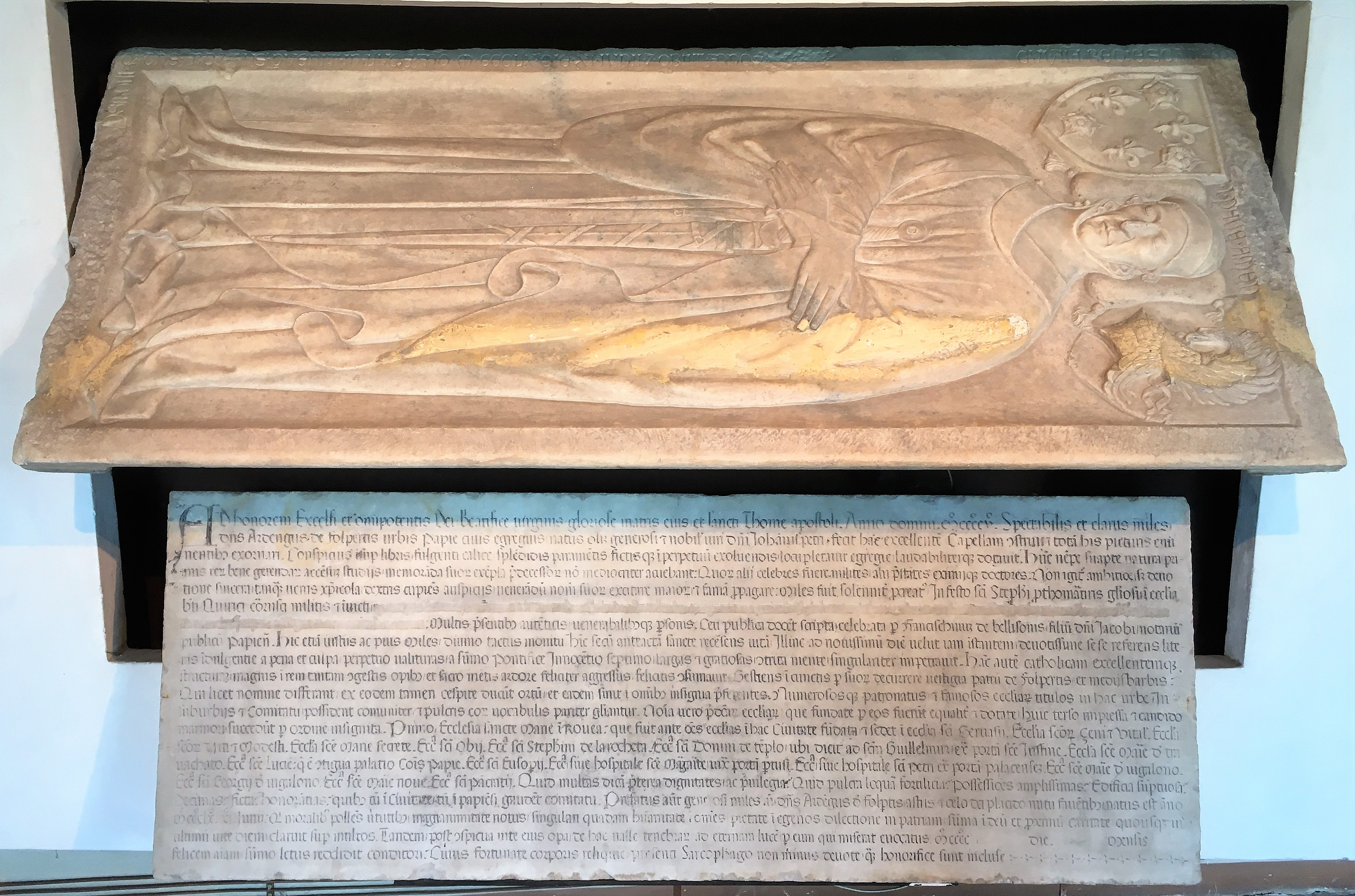
Jacopino da Tradate, tombstone of Ardengo Folperti, about 1430

=== Museum of the Risorgimento ===
The Museum of the Risorgimento was established by the municipality in 1885, initially thanks to the numerous bequests of citizens who, for various reasons, participated in the Risorgimento epic, and left documents, books, photographs, weapons and objects to the newborn museum. The museum itinerary is divided into three rooms: the first room covers the period from the years of Maria Theresa of Austria to the Kingdom of Lombardy–Venetia, dedicating particular space to the social, economic and cultural life of Pavia, to the liveliness of the university, also collecting materials of previous age, such as a seal of the municipality of Pavia of the sixteenth century. The second room is entirely dedicated to the Cairoli family, while the third room exhibits weapons and uniforms (Austrian, Piedmontese and French) from the Risorgimento period and dedicates space to the figure of Garibaldi and Benedetto Cairoli.

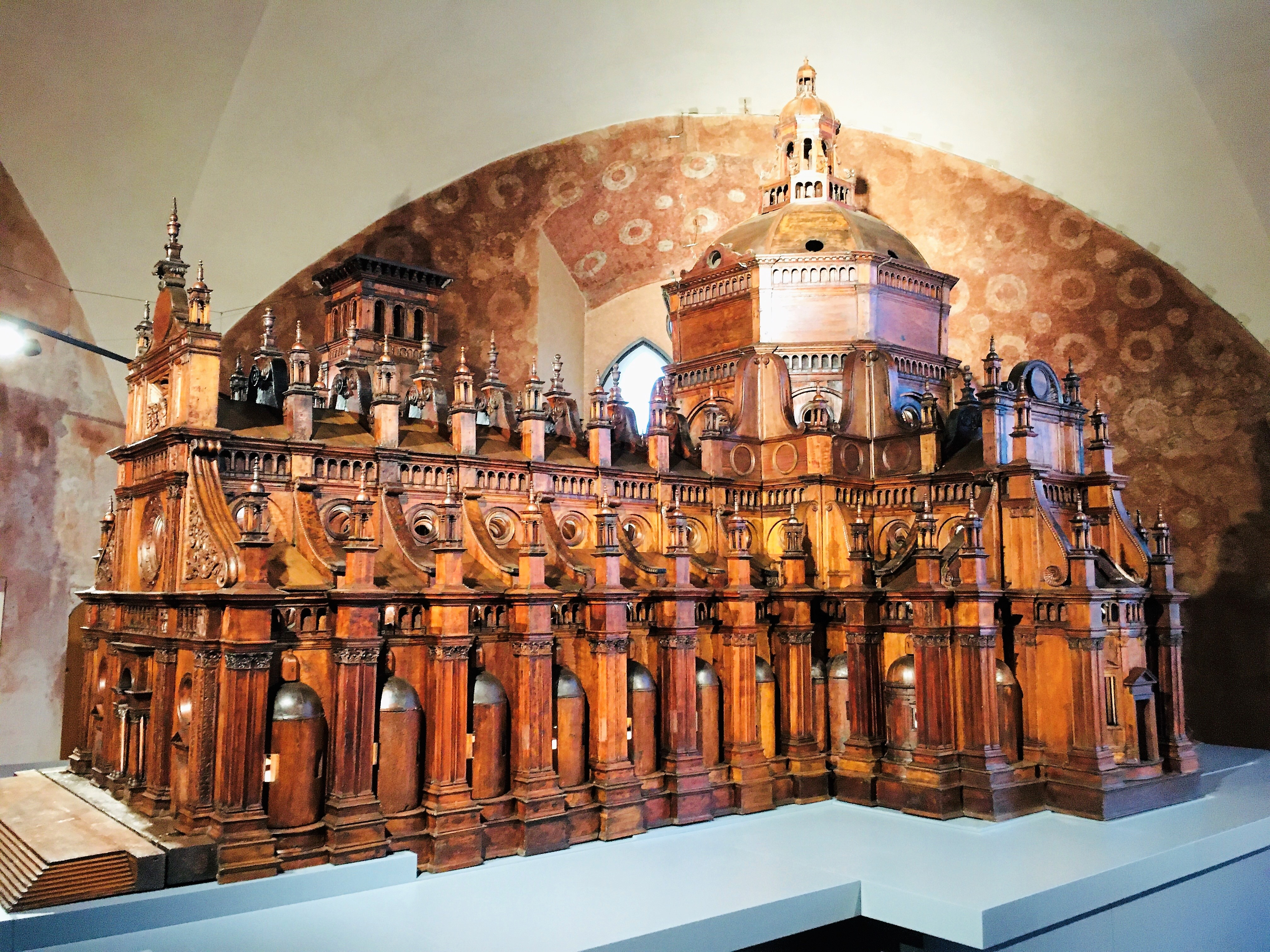
Model of the Cathedral of Pavia, 1497

=== Plaster Cast Gallery ===
The department, redesigned around 2010, presents over 200 sculptures from the 19th and 20th centuries, mostly in plaster: casts of ancient works, sketches, and finished pieces. The casts, often produced at the School of Drawing, Engraving, and Painting (active from 1838 to 1934), were used to study classical sculpture. They range from the Laocoön Group to the Belvedere Torso, from the Dancing Faun of Pompeii to the Venus de’ Medici. In addition, works in terracotta, bronze, and marble are also on display, among which pieces by Medardo Rosso, Filippo Tallone and Ernesto Bazzaro stand out. One of the highlights is the plaster cast of the frieze The Triumph of Alexander the Great in Babylon by Bertel Thorvaldsen.

=== Other collections ===
The museum also collects other collections, such as that of Luigi Robecchi Bricchetti, engineer and explorer from Pavia, who donated to the museum in 1926 numerous artifacts collected by him in Africa and that of Numismatics, formed above all thanks to important bequests, such as the collection of Camillo Brambilla, which has about 50,000 coins and covers a chronological period between the classical Greek issues and the minting of the modern period, with particular wealth for the sector relating to medieval and modern coins and coins issued by the Pavia mint. The collection was later expanded through additional donations, such as 42 solidi minted between 421 and 476 from Zeccone.

=== Pinacoteca Malaspina ===
The Malaspina art gallery has its core in the donation of the Marquis Malaspina; it was expanded with subsequent donations from various entities and personalities, such as Brambilla and Radlinski. In 2001 the art gallery was enriched by the legacy of the Pavia collectors Carla and Giulio Morone, the donation consists of 66 works, including paintings, pastels and drawings by Italian artists such as Federico Zandomeneghi, Giovanni Segantini, Plino Nomellini, Giuseppe de Nittis, Luigi Conconi, Daniele Ranzoni, Tranquillo Cremona, Giovanni Boldini, Giuseppe Pellizza da Volpedo, Vittore Grubicy de Dragon, Carlo Fornara, Oreste Albertini and many others. Inside the picture gallery there are also many examples of Pavia majolica, the city in fact, between the sixteenth and eighteenth centuries, was one of the main centers of majolica production in northern Italy.

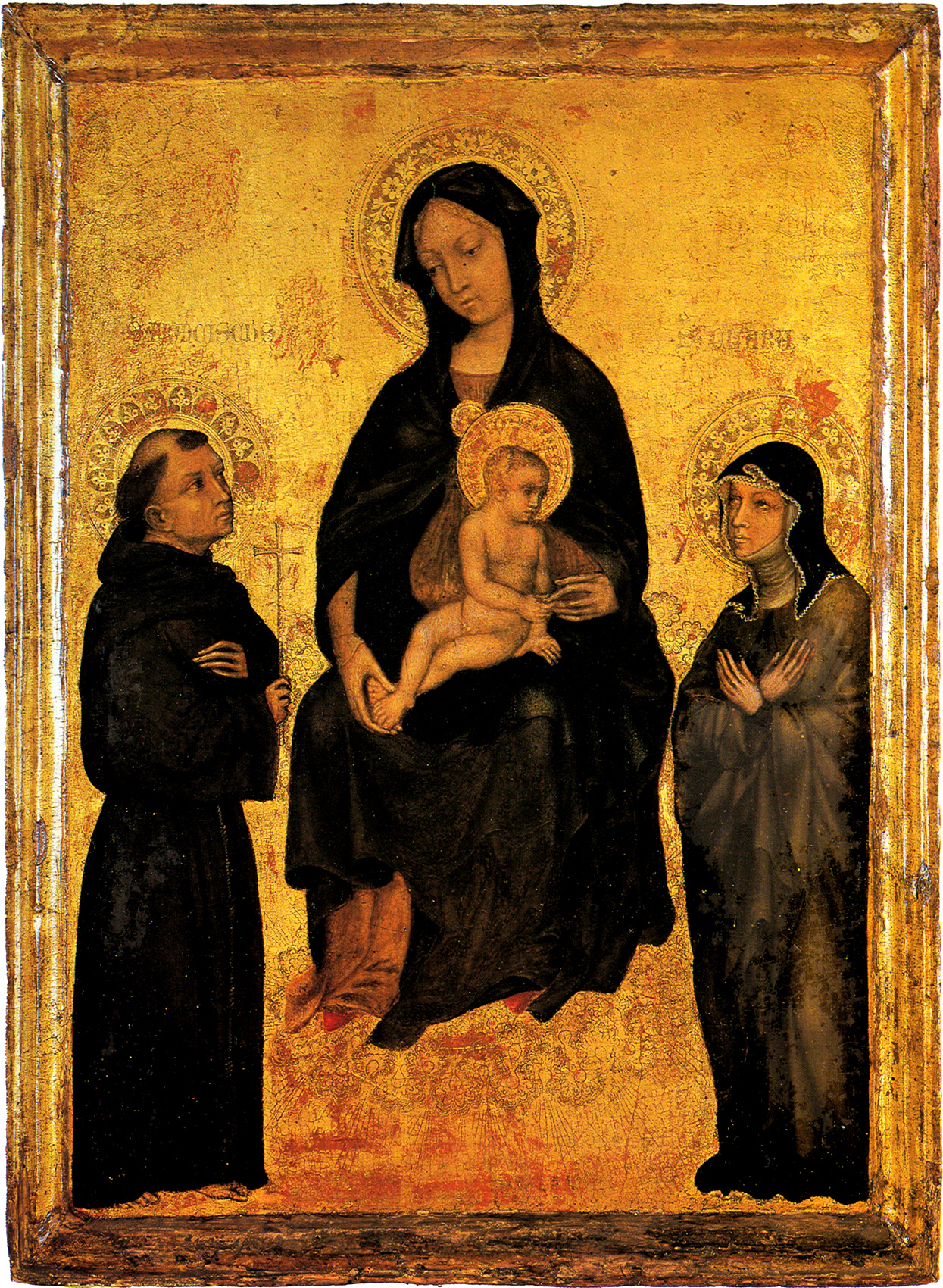
Gentile da Fabriano, Madonna and Child in Glory between Saints Francis and Clare.

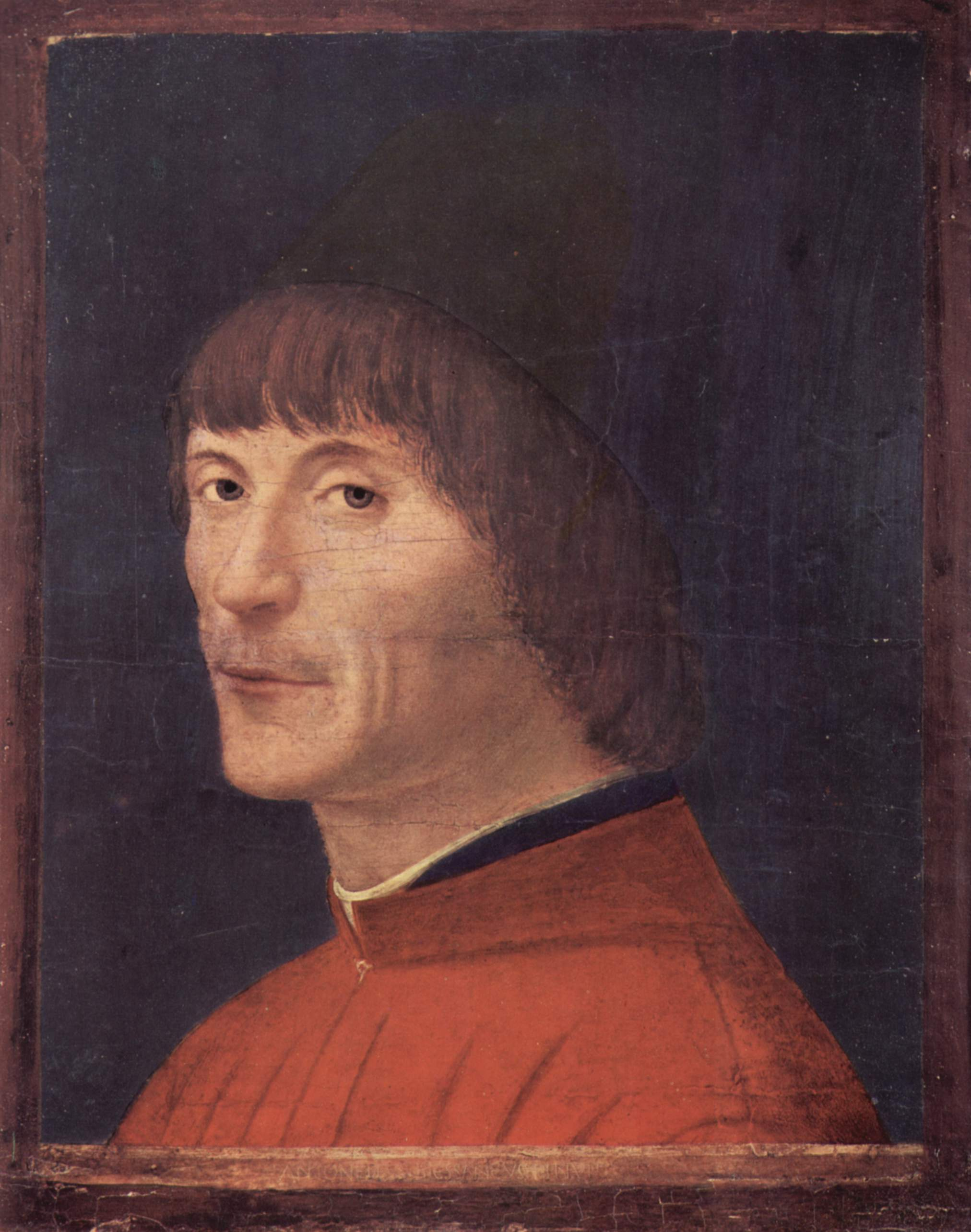
Antonello da Messina, portrait of a man.

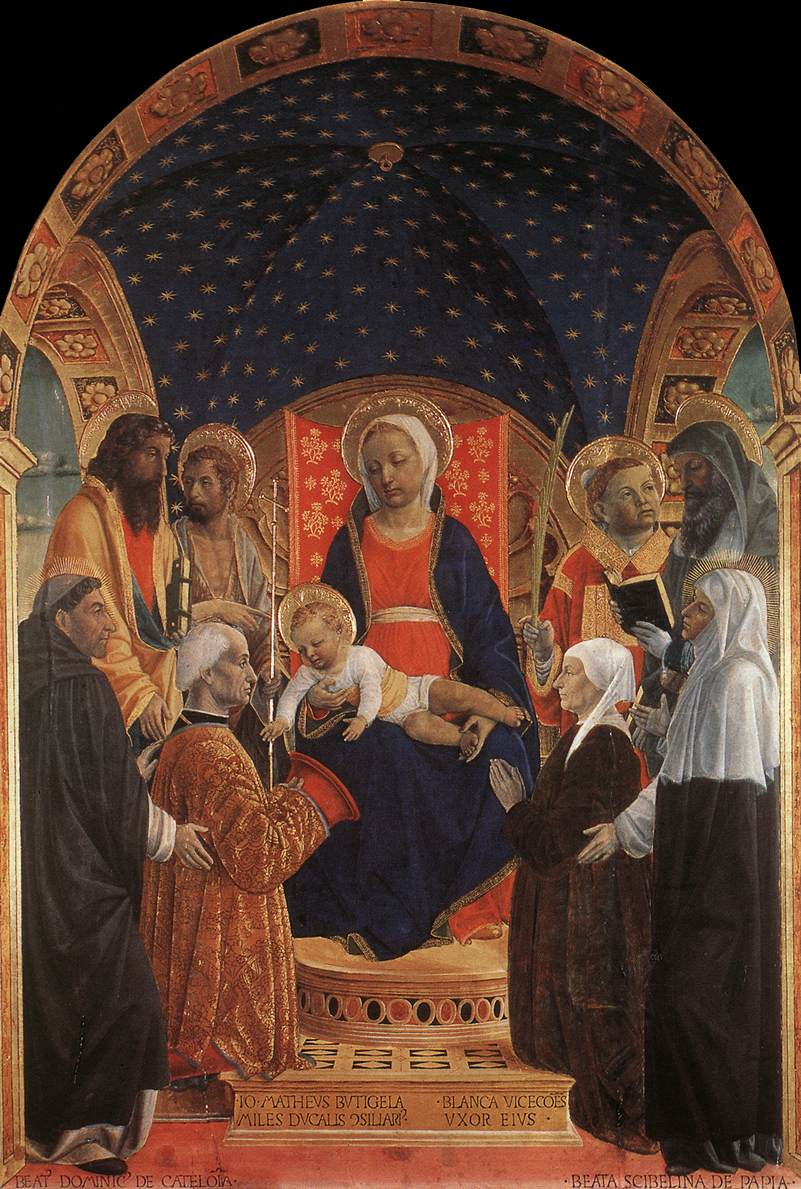
Vincenzo Foppa, pala Bottigella.

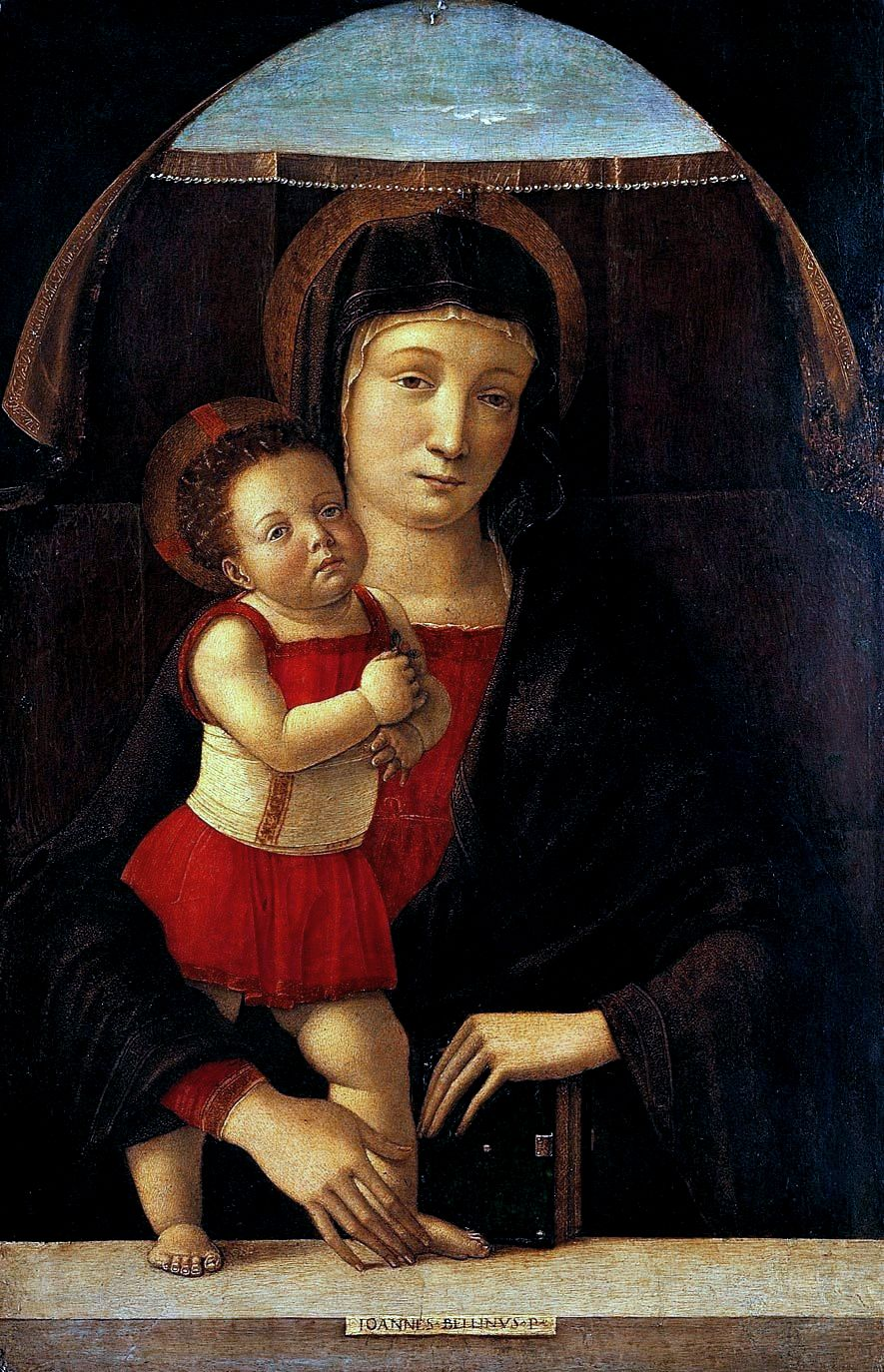
Giovanni Bellini, Madonna and Child.

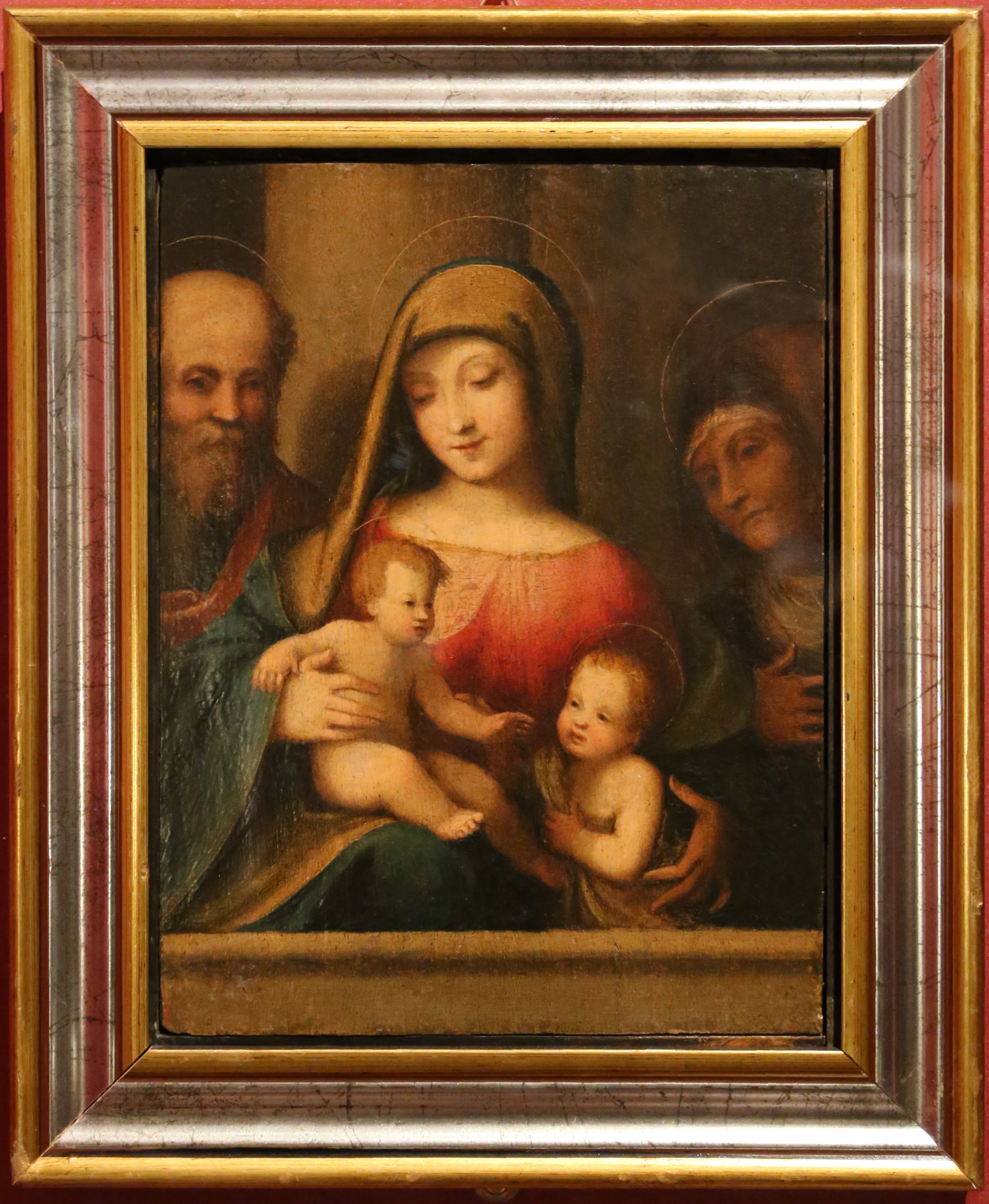
Correggio, Holy Family with Saints Elizabeth and John.

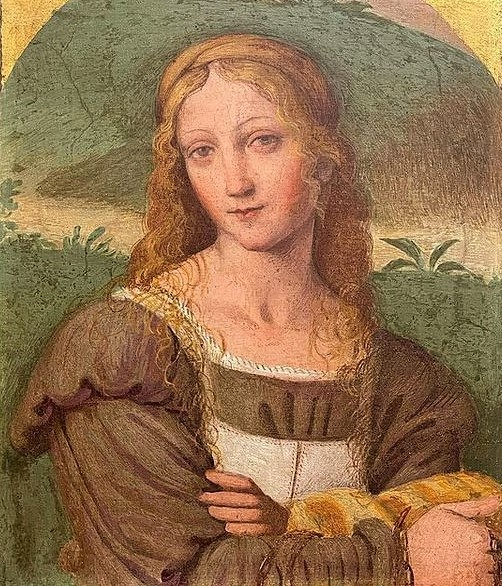
Bernardino Luini, portrait of a lady.

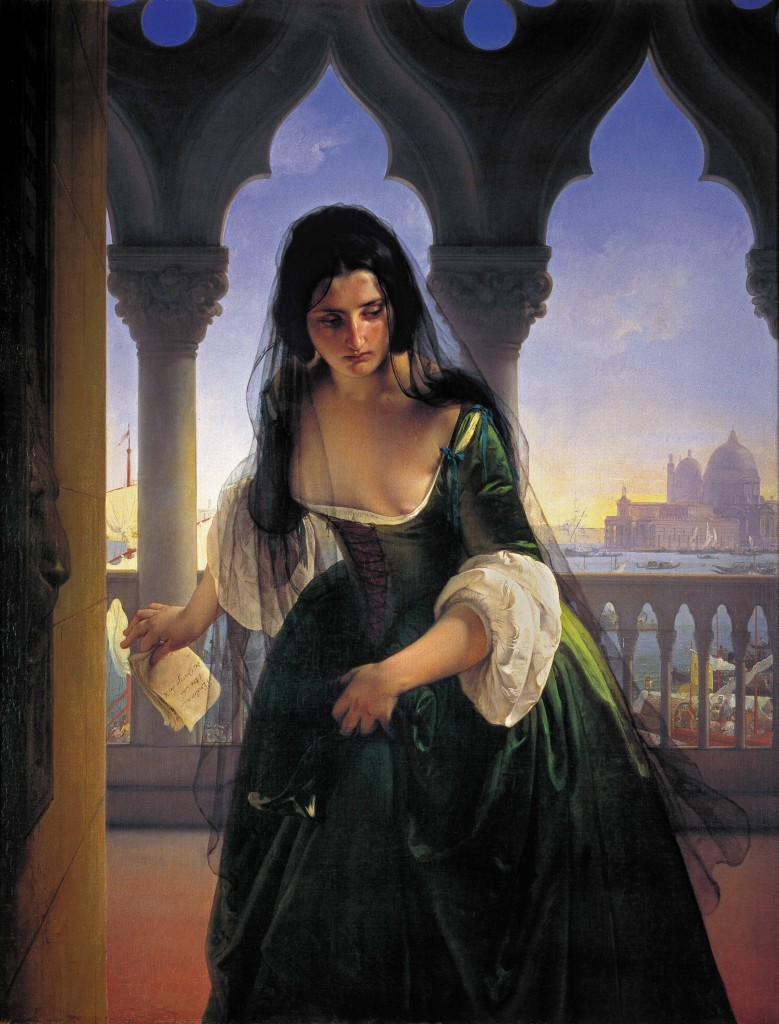
Francesco Hayez, Accusa segreta.

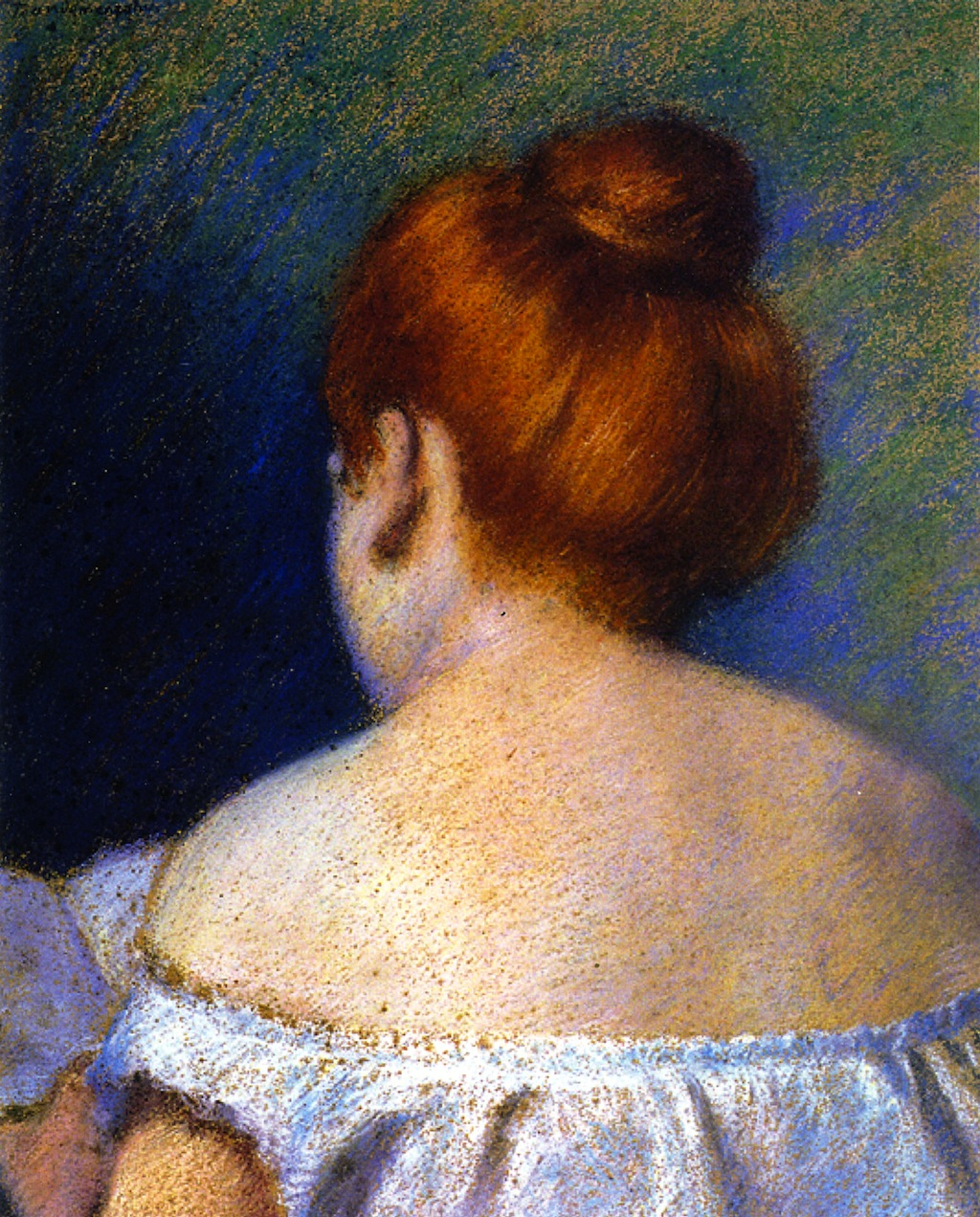
Federico Zandomeneghi, La Roussotte.

In one room there is the rare wooden model of the Cathedral from 1497, the work of Giovanni Pietro Fugazza and Cristoforo Rocchi, one of the few Renaissance wooden models that have survived.

The Pinacoteca Malaspina and the collections of paintings until 1800 include the following works:

- Master of the Adoration of Antwerp
- Master d'Arco
- Spinello Aretino
- Guariento d’Arpo
- Pietro Maria Bagnatore
- studio of Lazzaro Bastiani
- Master of Andriola de Barrachis
- Hans Sebald Beham
- Giovanni Bellini
- Bernardino Bergognone (?)
- Ambrogio Bevilacqua
- Isidoro Bianchi (?)
- Michele Bono, (Giambono)
- Jacobello di Bonomo
- Alessandro Bonvicino (il Moretto)
- Domenico Brusasorzi
- Bernardino Butinone
- Luca Cambiaso
- Domenico Campagnola
- Ottaviano Cane
- Giovanni Francesco Caroto
- ‘’Maestro dei Cartellini’’
- Jacopo del Casentino
- Matteo della Chiesa
- Studio of Jean Clouet
- Jan Wellens de Cock
- Raffaellino del Colle
- Cima da Conegliano
- Correggio
- Lorenzo Costa and Studio
- Studio of Lorenzo di Credi
- Giovanni Battista Crespi (il Cerano)
- Ortensio Crespi
- Giovanni Pietro and Giovanni Ambrogio De Donati
- Adam Elsheimer
- Gentile da Fabriano
- Paolo Farinati
- Bernardino Fasolo
- Floriano Ferramola
- Defendente Ferrari
- Giovanni Ambrogio Figino
- Simone di Filippo (Simone de' Crocifissi)
- Vincenzo Foppa
- Ambrogio da Fossano, (il Bergognone)
- Lattanzio Gambara
- Teodoro Ghisi
- Studio of Giampietrino
- Gerolamo Giovenone
- Hugo van der Goes
- Pietro Grammorseo (attribution)
- Bernardino Licinio
- Bernardino Luini
- Cesare Magni
- Giovanni Mansueti
- Studio of Pietro Marone
- Girolamo Melegulo (?)
- Antonello da Messina
- Master of San Miniato
- Girolamo Mocetto
- Michelino Molinari, (da Besozzo)
- Luca Mombello
- Bartolomeo Montagna
- Master of Montefiore Conca (attribution)
- Panfilo Nuvolone
- Carlo Francesco Panfilo
- School of Joachim Patinir
- Palma il Giovane and his school
- Bernardino Parenzano
- Giovanni di Pietro da Pisa
- Studio of Frans Pourbus the younger
- School of Camillo Procaccini
- Gandolfino da Roreto
- Benedetto Rusconi
- Paolo Antonio de Scazoli
- (Fra Battista Spagnoli or Battista Mantovano (?)
- Terenzio Terenzi (il Rondolino)
- School of Francesco Terzi
- Gerolamo Tessari, (Girolamo Del Santo)
- Benvenuto Tisi (Garofalo)
- Giovan Battista Trotti, (il Malosso)
- Studio of Bonifacio Veronese
- Paolo Veronese
- Francesco da Verzate
- Giacomino Vismara
- Alvise Vivarini
- Rogier van der Weyden (copy)
- Bernardo Zenale
- Jan van Kessel the Elder
- Philipp Peter Roos
- Nicola Malinconico
- Filippo Abbiati
- Antonio Zanchi
- Francesco Zuccarelli
- Pompeo Batoni
- Alessandro Magnasco
- Giovanni Domenico Tiepolo
- Anton Raphael Mengs

=== Quadreria dell'Ottocento ===
The collection of the Quadreria dell'Ottocento (19th-Century Picture Gallery), located on the second floor, offers a captivating journey through the painting and sculpture of the period. It allows for both an art-historical and a historical perspective on political and military events. The collection includes masterpieces of national significance alongside outstanding works by local artists, supported and promoted by the Civica Scuola di Pittura, the Municipal School of Painting that was active from 1842 to 1934. The Quadreria dell'Ottocento and the collections of paintings until 1900 include the following works:

- Francesco Fidanza
- Andrea Appiani
- Gaspare Landi
- Felice Giani
- Natale Schiavoni
- Giovanni Migliara
- Pietro Ronzoni
- Giuseppe Molteni
- Giovanni Carnovali
- Francesco Hayez
- Enrico Scuri
- Giacomo Trecourt
- Pasquale Massacra
- Girolamo Induno
- Federico Faruffini
- Carlo Arienti
- Tranquillo Cremona

=== Collezione Morone ===
The Collezione Morone, recently installed in a newly renovated space on the second floor of the Visconti Castle with the support of the Lombardy Region, originates from the extraordinary legacy of the couple Giulio Morone and Carla Perotti, collectors from Pavia. In 2001, they donated 66 paintings of various genres to the museum: from works by artists of the Scapigliatura movement, such as Conconi, Ranzoni, and Cremona, to those influenced by French art, like Zandomeneghi, Boldini, and De Nittis, and to experiments with divided brushstrokes by Pellizza da Volpedo, Grubicy de Dragon, and Carlo Fornara. The Collezione Morone and the collections of paintings include the following works:

- Gianbettino Cignaroli
- Charles-François Daubigny
- Vincenzo Cabianca
- Federico Zandomeneghi
- Giovanni Boldini
- Giuseppe De Nittis
- Francesco Paolo Michetti
- Leonardo Bazzaro
- Cesare Tallone
- Giovanni Segantini
- Giuseppe Pellizza da Volpedo
- Charles-François-Prosper Guérin
- Ambrogio Antonio Alciati
- Giuseppe Amisani
- Armando Spadini

== Bibliography ==
- Musei Civici di Pavia, Milano, Skira, 2017.
- Musei civici di Pavia: Pavia longobarda e capitale di regno: secoli VI- X, a cura di Saverio Lomartire, Davide Tolomelli, Milano, Skira, 2017.
- Pavia visconteo-sforzesca : il Castello, la città, la Certosa, a cura di Davide Tolomelli, Milano, Skira, 2016.
- La Pinacoteca Malaspina, a cura di Susanna Zatti, Milano, Skira, 2011.
- La collezione di impronte glittiche del marchese Luigi Malaspina di Sannazzaro: Musei civici di Pavia, Sezione arti minori, a cura di Carlamaria Tomaselli, Pisa, ETS, 2006.
- Andrea Mantegna e l'incisione italiana del Rinascimento nelle collezioni dei Musei civici di Pavia: Pavia, Castello Visconteo, 15 novembre 2003-15 gennaio 2004, a cura di Saverio Lomartire, Corbetta, Il Guado, 2003.
- La collezione Morone, a cura di Susanna Zatti, Milano, Skira, 2002.
- La quadreria dell'Ottocento, a cura di Susanna Zatti, Milano, Skira, 2002.
- Novella Vismara, Le collezioni numismatiche dei Civici Musei di Pavia, Como, Litografia New Press, 1994.
- Claudia Maccabruni, I vetri romani dei Musei civici di Pavia: lettura di una collezione, Pavia, Ticinum, 1983.
- Il castello visconteo di Pavia e i suoi musei: guida, a cura di Donata Vicini, Logos international, in collaborazione con il Comune di Pavia, Assessorato alla cultura, 1984.
