= Fasolo =

Fasolo is a surname. Notable people with the surname include:

- Alex Fasolo (born 1992), Australian footballer
- Bernardino Fasolo (Pavia, 1489–1526/1527), Italian painter
- Claudio Fasolo (born 1960), Italian former professional racing cyclist
- Giovanni Antonio Fasolo (1530–1572), Italian painter
- Giovanni Battista Fasolo (1598 – after 1664), Franciscan friar, organist and composer
- Giulio Fasolo (born 1998), Italian football player
- Lorenzo Fasolo (1463–1518), Lombard painter; also known as Lorenzo di Pavia
- Mike Fasolo (born 1969), American writer
