= Bernardino Licinio =

Italian painter

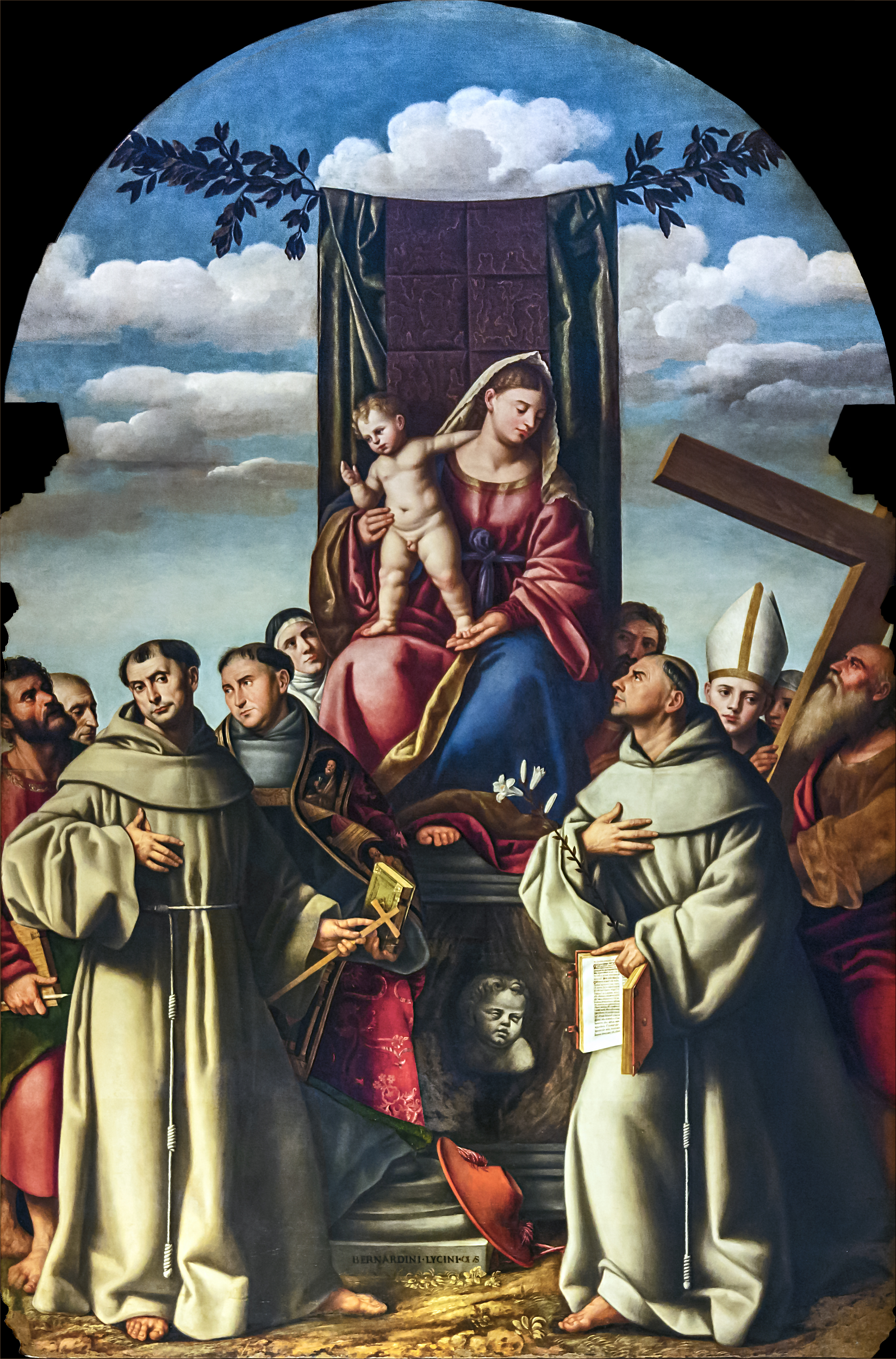
Madonna with Child in Arms, Frari, Venice

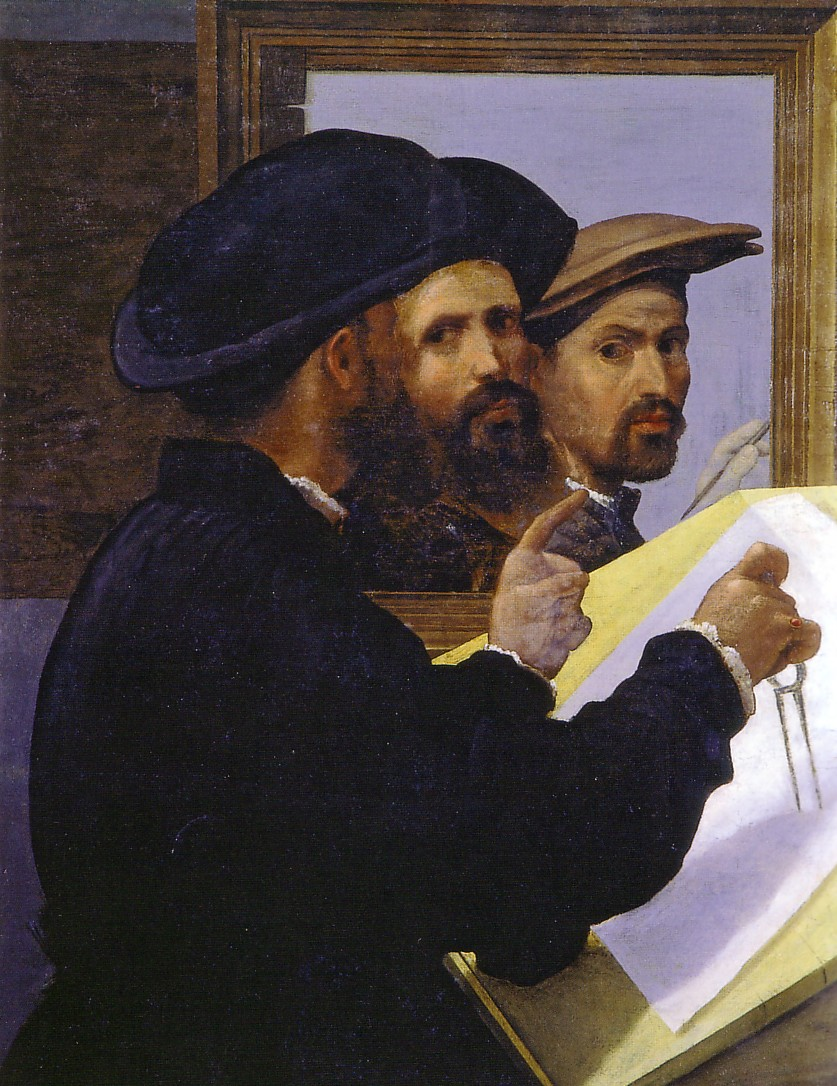
Portrait of an architect with a self-portrait of Bernardo Licinio in the background (ca. 1520-1530S), Martin von Wagner Museum

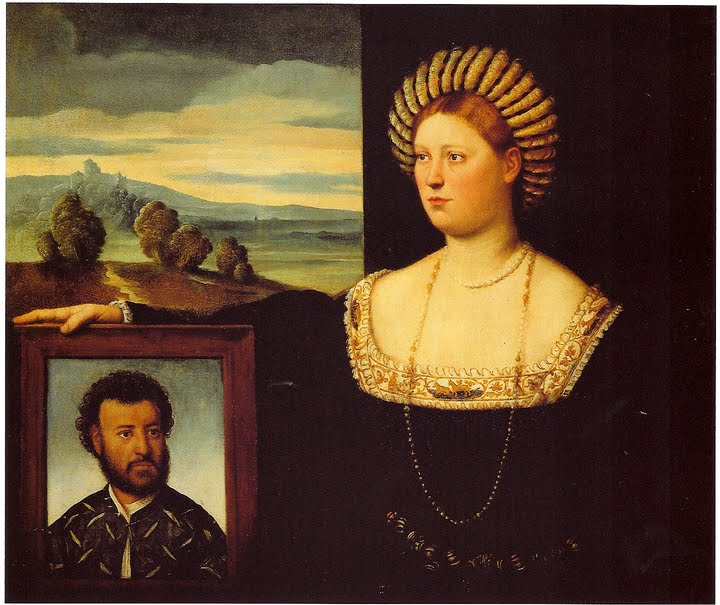
Bernardino Licinio. A wife with her husband's portrait. c. 1500. Bergamo, Italy

Bernardino Licinio (c. 1489 in Poscante – 1565) was an Italian High Renaissance painter of Venice and Lombardy. He mainly painted portraits and religious canvases.

== Life ==
Bernardino was the second son of ser Antonio Licino, part of a family from the municipality of Poscante in Bergamo. The first son was Arrigo or Rigo, the third (Zuane Battista) became a priest of the church of San Cassiano in Venice and the fourth (Niccolò) was also a parish priest of the church of San Biagio in Venice. From the information about his brothers, it can be deduced that Bernardino was born around 1489. In 1511 it appears he was already orphaned by his father and working as a painter. Bernardino and Arrigo soon settled in Venice, like many Bergamo artists of the time.

The date of his death is not known but there are no documents and notarial deeds mentioning him after 1550, which could be considered his death date.

The work of Bernardino was properly attributed to him only in the early twentieth century, thanks to the clarification intervention of Gustav Ludwig in 1903. The misattribution was caused by Giorgio Vasari, who in both editions of the Lives, confused Bernardino Licinio with Il Pordenone, effectively obscuring both the life and the works of Bernardino Licinio for more than three centuries.

== Anthology of Works ==
- Holy Family with the Magdalene
- Man with a Skull
- Stefano Nani
- Lady Portrait (Beli Dvor, Belgrade)
- Ottaviano Grimani
- Madonna Enthroned with Saints (1535, Frari, Venice)
- Return of the Prodigal Son, National Museum of Art of Romania, Bucharest
- The Madonna and Child with Saint Joseph and a Female Martyr, (1510–30, National Gallery, London)
- Portrait of Stefano Nani, (1528, National Gallery, London)
- A Sculptor in his Studio with Five of his Pupils, One Holding an Armless Statue of Venus, (Alnwick Castle, Northumberland)
- Madonna and Child with Saint Francis, Uffizi Gallery, Florence,
- Portrait of a Lady, (Courtauld Gallery, London)
- Portrait of lady with red dress, Pavia Civic Museums
- Madonna with Child in Arms, Frari, Venice
- Franciscan Martyrs, Frari, Venice,
- Presentation in the Temple, Museum Wiesbaden
