= Ennion =

Roman glassworker and first known maker of decorated mold-blown glass

Ennion was one of the most prominent glassworkers of Ancient Rome, active from about 1 to 50 CE. He is famous for being the first known maker of decorated mold-blown glass, and for the exquisite quality of his work.

Ennion branded his work by signing them.

His works of art in glass (various vessels) were traded throughout the Mediterranean and were in great demand among the wealthy Romans. To date, only about fifty specimens have been preserved, which were found at various archeological sites from Spain to Israel.

== Biography ==
Ennion probably lived and worked in the city of Sidon, in the province of Roman Syria. Although his name was Semitic in origin, he signed his work in Greek, the lingua franca of the eastern Mediterranean in his time. He is thought to have been a Phoenician, and some scholars believe that later in life, with growing fame and demand, he moved to the north Italian city of Aquileia, closer to Rome and its markets.

== Mold-blown glass ==
Ennion is the first known maker (and/or workshop owner) of decorated mold-blown glass, a technique based on blowing bubbles of molten glass into molds. He was renowned for producing multi-panelled mold-blown glass vessels that were complex in their shapes, arrangement and decorative motifs. The complexity of designs of these mold-blown glass vessels illustrated the sophistication of the glassworkers in the eastern regions of the Roman Empire. Mold-blown glass vessels manufactured by the workshops of Ennion and other contemporary glassworkers such as Jason, Nikon, Aristeas, and Meges, constitutes some of the earliest evidence of glassblowing found in the eastern territories.

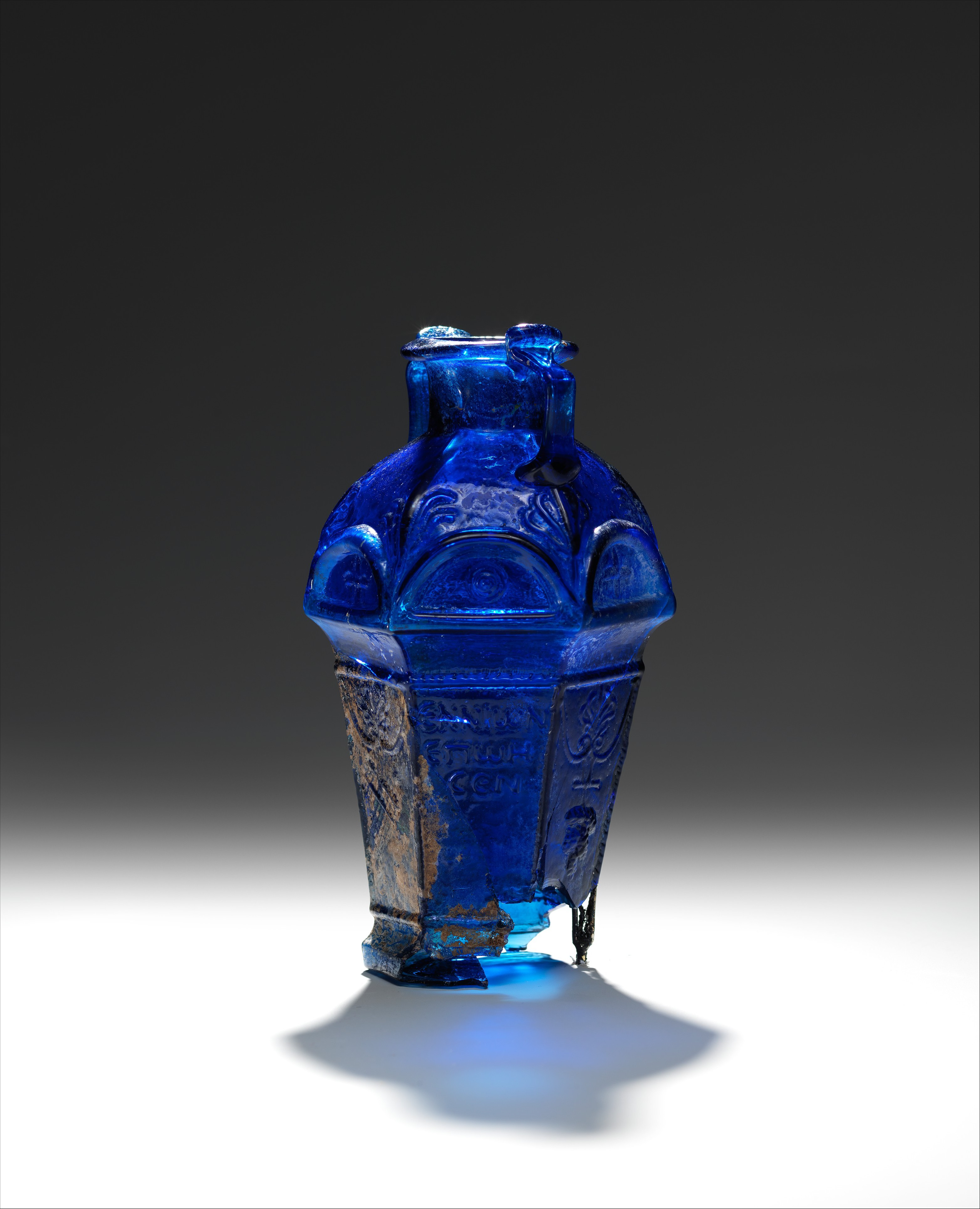
Glass hexagonal amphoriskos

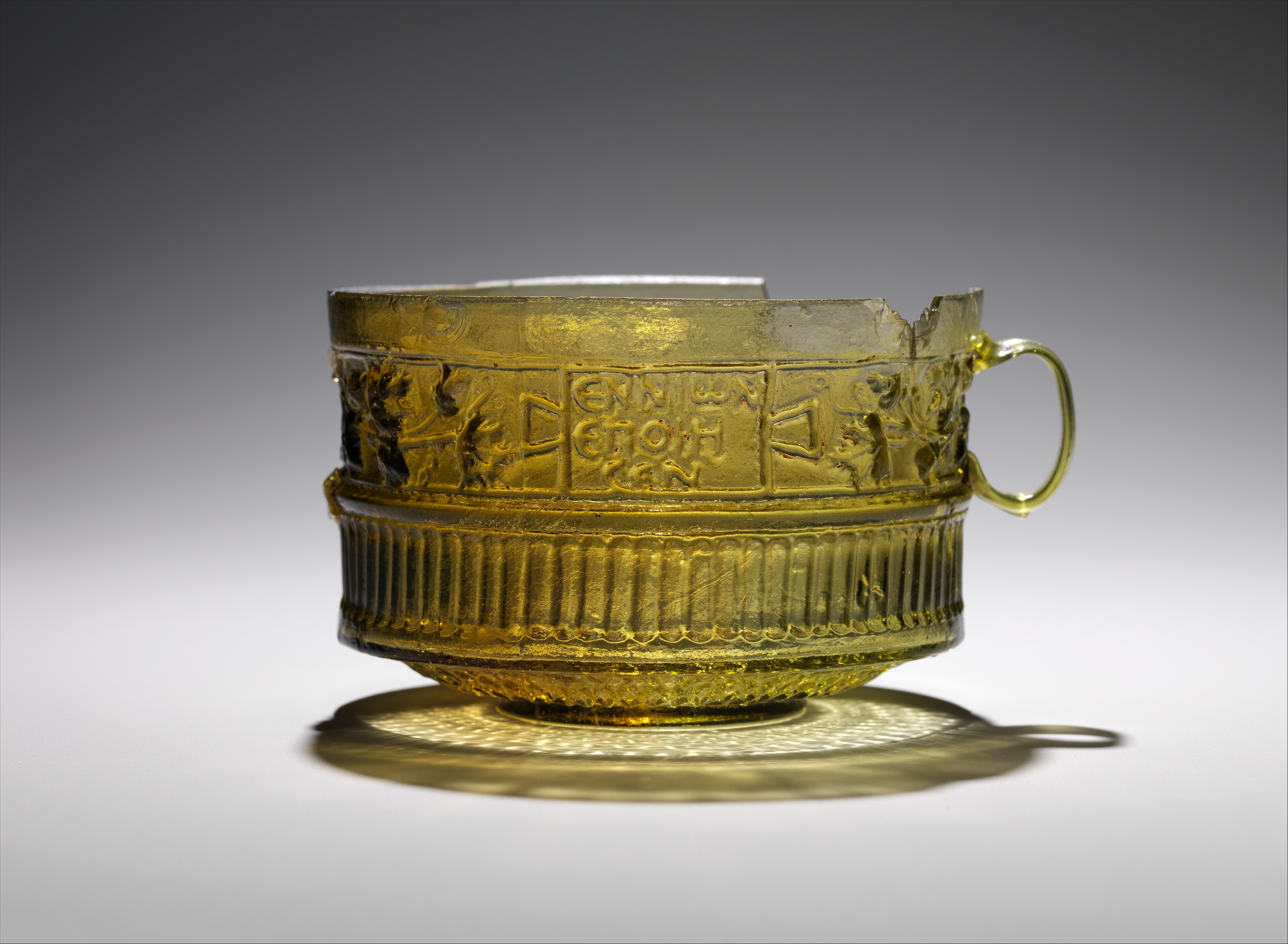
Glass cup

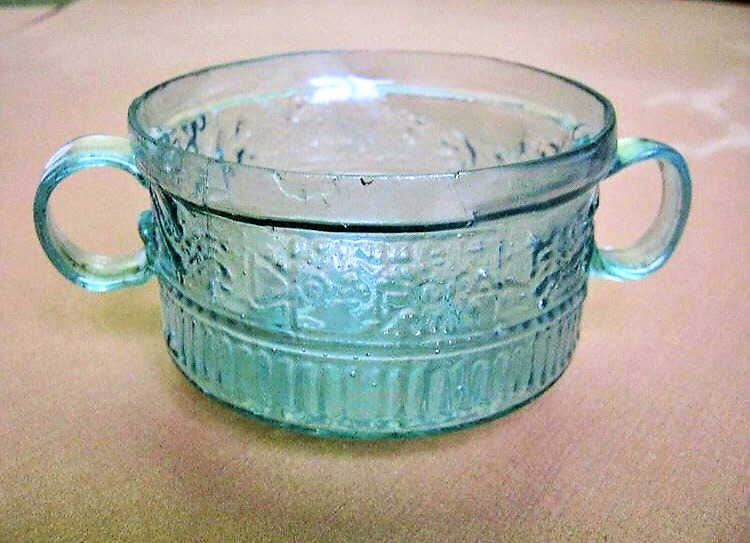
Glass cup (Pavia Civic Museum)

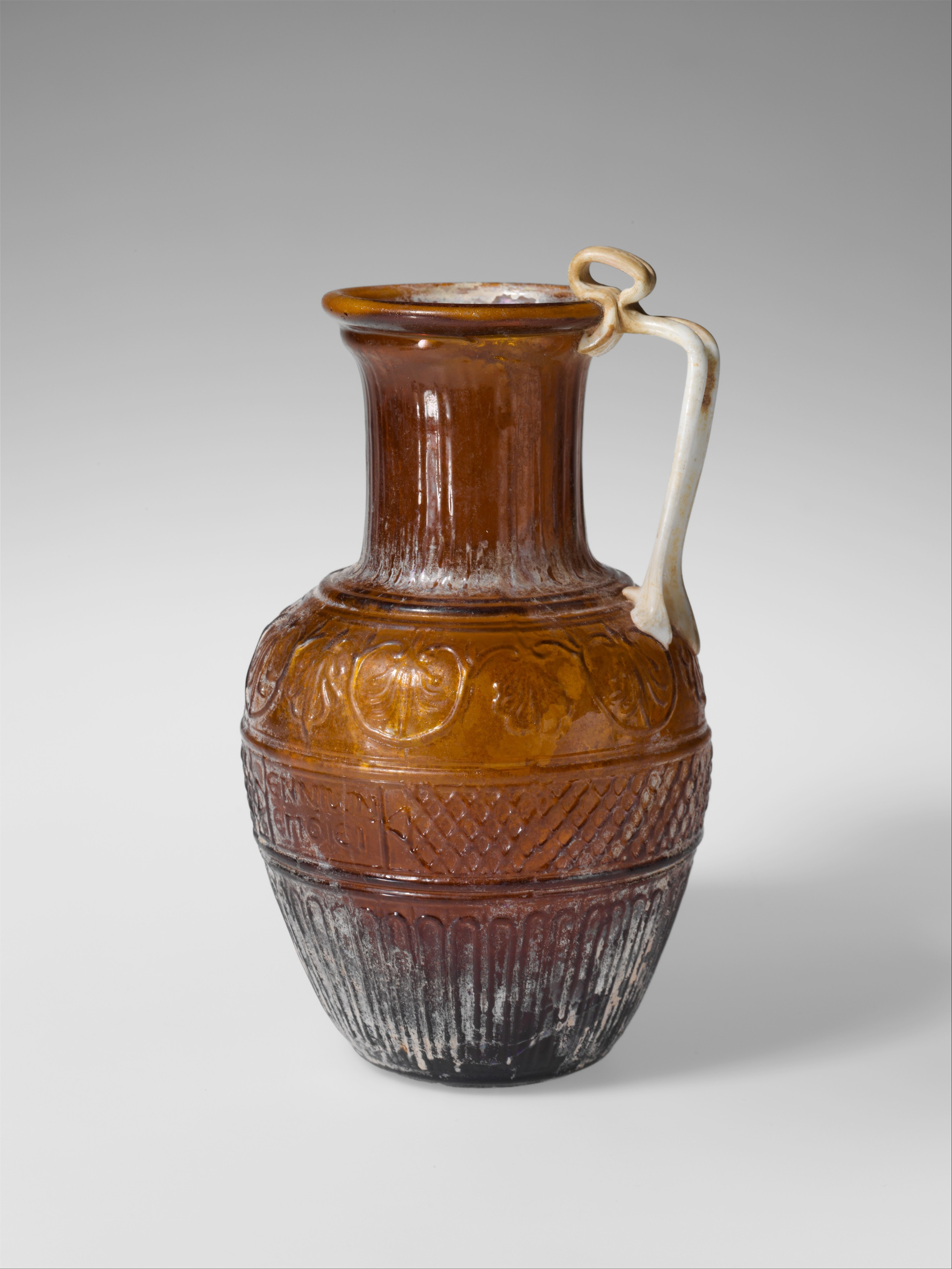
Glass jug

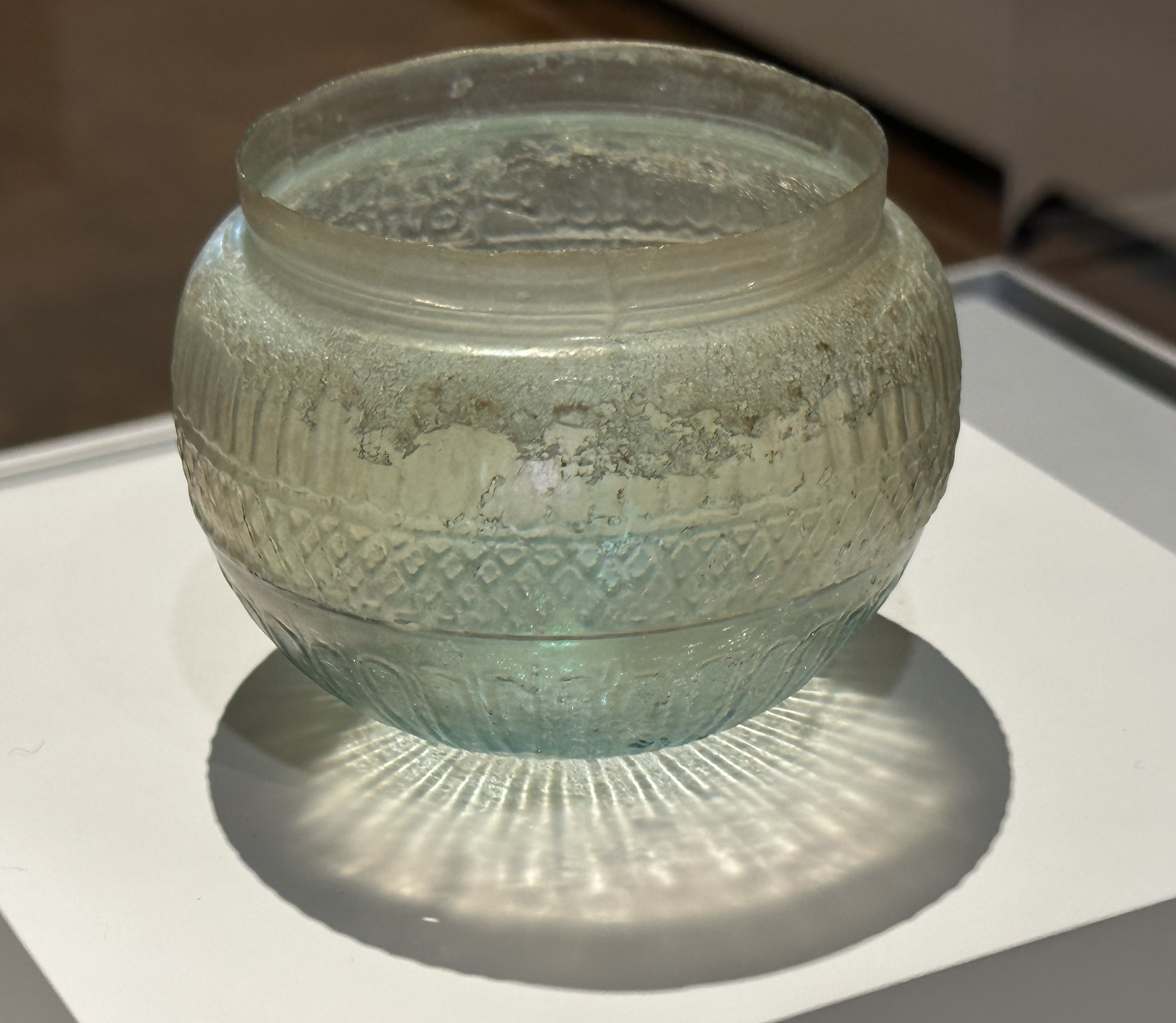
Glass bowl (Chrysler Museum of Art)
