= Lorenzo Fasolo =

Italian painter

Lorenzo Fasolo (1463–1518), called Lorenzo di Pavia, was a Lombard painter living in the early part of the 16th century, who went from Pavia to Genoa, and was one of the artists employed by Lodovico Sforza in 1490 in the decorations of the Porta Giovia Palace at Milan. His chief work is an altar-piece representing The Deposition from the Cross, which he painted in 1508, for the nuns of Santa Chiara, at Chiavari, where it still remains. The Louvre has by him The Family of the Virgin, dated 1513. His son Bernardino Fasolo was also a painter.
