= Bernardino Fasolo =

Italian painter

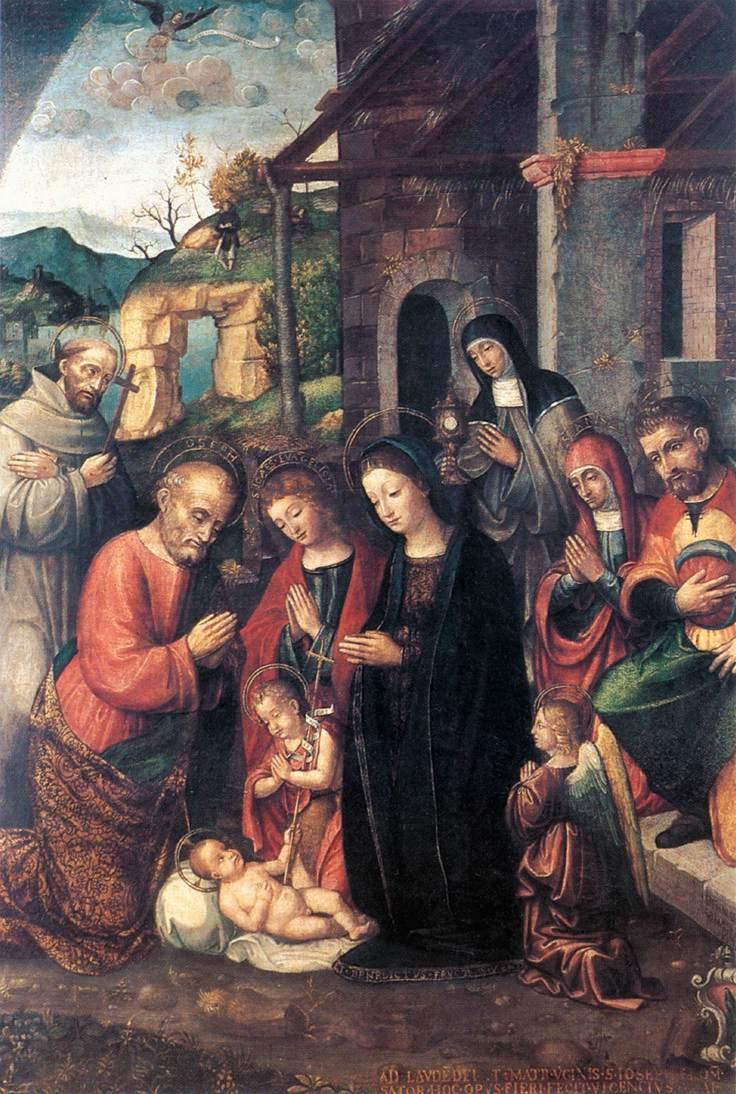
Nativity, 1526, Musei Civici di Pavia

Bernardino Fasolo (1489 – 1526/1527) was an Italian painter.

== Biography ==
He was the son of Lorenzo Fasolo, and was living in the 16th century in his native Pavia. He is known to have been a member of the council of the Guild in Genoa in 1520. The following pictures are by him:

- A Holy Family, Berlin Gallery.
- Portrait of a Venetian Lady, Dresden Gallery.
- Virgin and Child (1518) Santuario del Monte, Genoa.
