= Pasquale Massacra =

Italian painter

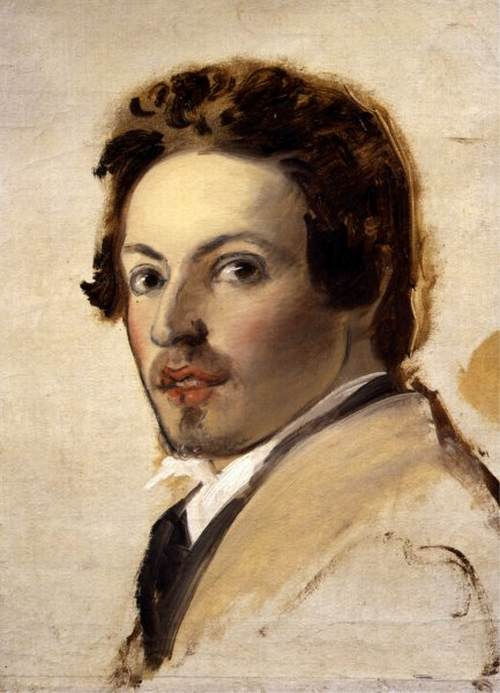
Pasquale Massacra Portrait

Pasquale Massacra (February 23, 1819 – March 16, 1849) was an Italian painter.

He was born and died in Pavia. Born to indigent parents, he was educated by professor Ferreri in Pavia. He became involved in the patriotic revolutionary insurrections of 1848. He was killed during a night time raid. His main works include canvases depicting the Mother of Riccardino Langosco tracks the Body of her son, Frate Bussolari, and Filippone il Sicario.
