= Ambrogio Antonio Alciati =

Italian painter

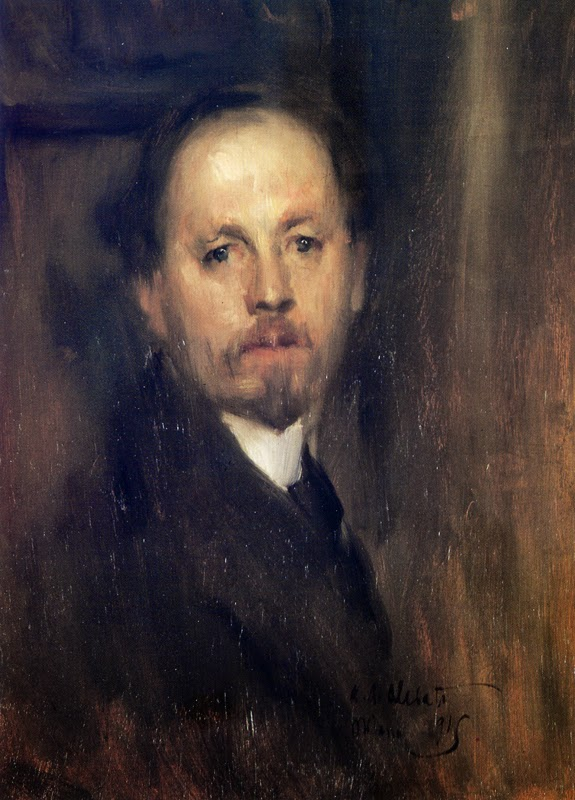
Self-portrait

Antonio Ambrogio Alciati (1878 – 8 March 1929) was an Italian painter mainly in Northern Italy.

== Biography ==
He was born in Vercelli, in the Piedmont. Initially studying at the Istituto di Belle Arti in Vercelli, in 1889, he moved to Milan, where he studied under Vespasiano Bignami and Cesare Tallone at the Brera Academy. In 1920, he replaced Tallone as professor of figure at the academy. His portraits recall the impasto effects of Tranquillo Cremona, Giovanni Boldini, Mosè Bianchi, and Eugène Carrière.

He painted frescoes for the Villa Pirotta of Brunate (near Como) and also for churches in Lombardy. He was an active member of the Masons, rising in 1922 to the level of master.

== Gallery ==
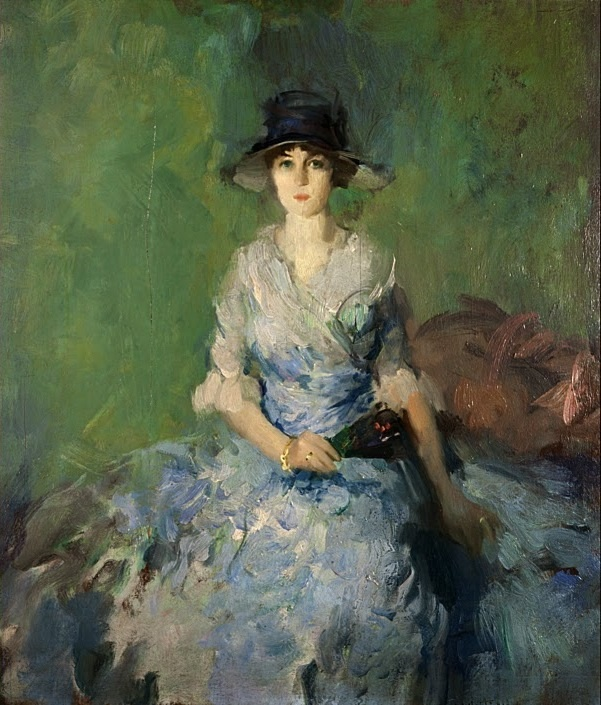
Portrait of a lady

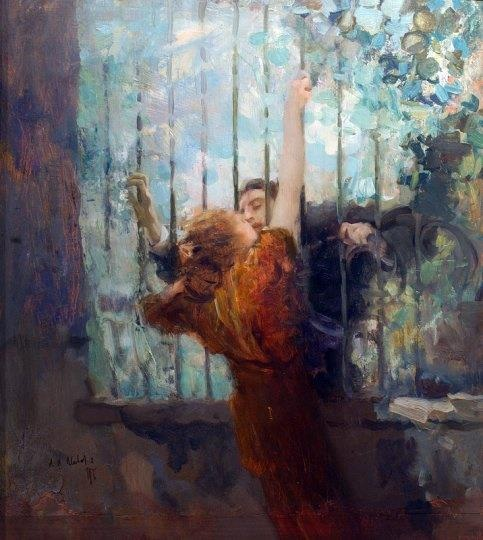
Il convegno

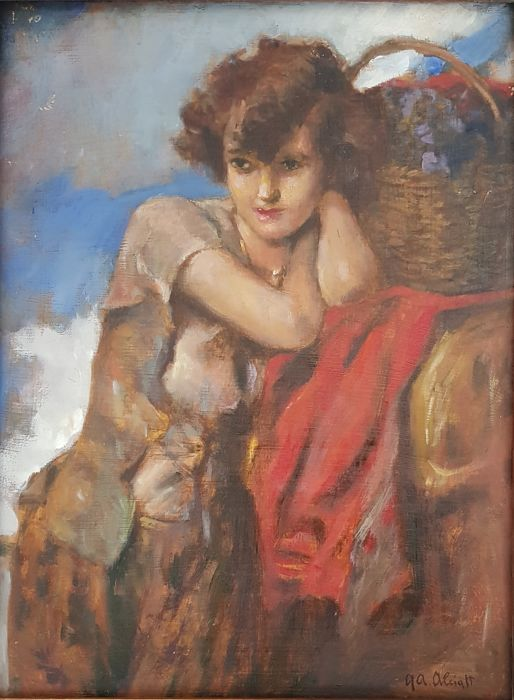
Pensieri

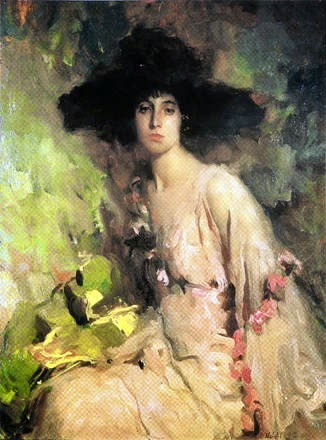
Woman with a hat

== Bibliography ==
- I ritratti di A. Alciati alla Quadriennale, in « L'illustrazione italiana », 1908
