= Jacopino da Tradate =

Italian Gothic sculptor

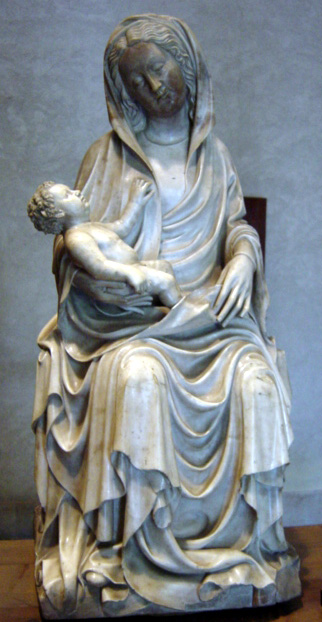
Jacopino da Tradate, Madonna and Child, Museum of Modern Art, Castello Sforzesco

Jacopino da Tradate (c. 1371 – 1445) Tradate, was an Italian Gothic sculptor active in Lombardy and the County of Savoy.

Jacopino created the statue of Pope Martin V for the Duomo of Milan.
