= Gignous =

Gignous is a surname. Notable people with the surname include:

- Eugenio Gignous (1850–1906), Italian painter
- Lorenzo Gignous (1862–1958), Italian painter, nephew of Eugenio

== See also ==
- Gignoux (disambiguation)
