= Carlo Pizzi =

Italian painter (1842–1909)

Carlo Pizzi (Lecco, Lombardy, Austrian Empire, 1842 – 1909) was an Italian painter, mainly of landscapes of his native Lombardy.

Born to a family of modest means, he studied at the Brera Academy, where he was a pupil of Gaetano Fasanotti, Ricciardi, and Raffaele Casnedi. As a landscape artist, he was influenced by his fellow alumni, Eugenio Gignous and Silvio Poma.

In 1872, to Milan, he sent: Lungo l'Adda presso Brivio and La Molgora in Brianza; in 1877 he exhibited Le Alpi, Una mattina; and in 1881 and 1883: L'Autunno, Un vano nel Ticino, Fiori, and Maggino sulle Prealpi e Breglia presso il Lago di Como. His Ticino painting was again exhibited in Rome in 1883. In 1884 at the Turin Exhibition, he sent: Pescarenico and Monte Resegone and La palude. In 1886 at Milan, he exhibited: Viottola fra i castani, Un guado, Un fiume, Una palude (lithograph), and Un torrente. In 1887 at Venice, he exhibited: Rimorchiatore and Mare. In 1888 at Bologna, he exhibited a canvas depicting L'Isola dei Pescatori sul Lago Maggiore.
