= Giuseppe Canella =

Italian painter (1788–1847)

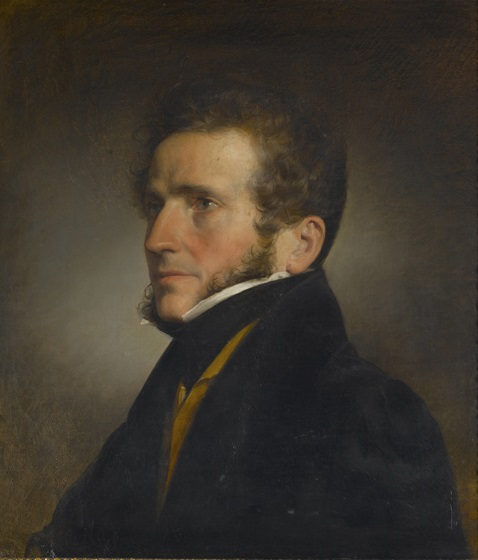
- Friedrich von Amerling: Portrait of Giuseppe Canella
- Born: July 28, 1788; Verona
- Died: September 11, 1847 (aged 59); Florence

Giuseppe Canella (28 July 1788 – 11 September 1847), also referred to as Giuseppe Canella the Elder, was an Italian painter.

== Biography ==
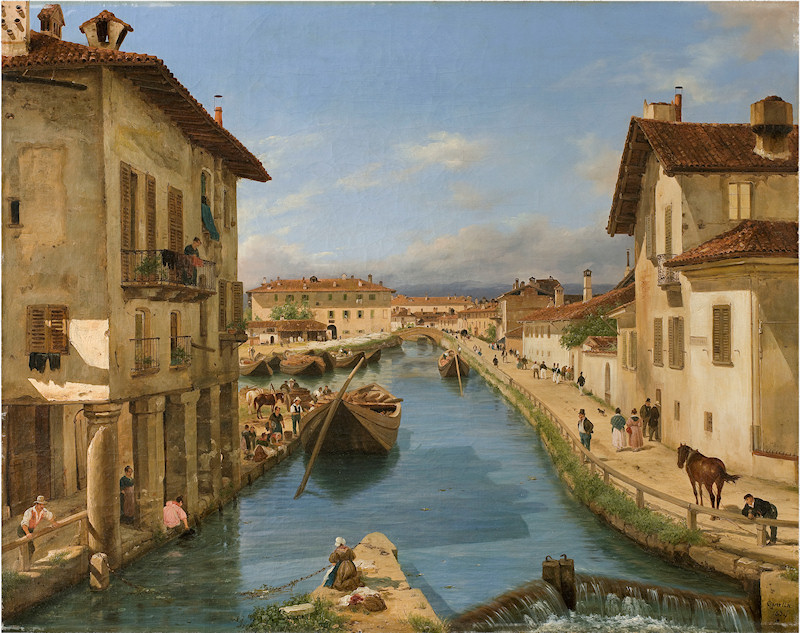
View of the Naviglio canal taken from the San Marco bridge, 1834

Initially trained by his father Giovanni, an architect, fresco painter and set designer, Giuseppe Canella started out producing stage sets and decorating stately homes in Verona and Mantua. His brother, Carlo Canella, was also a painter. It may have been under the influence of Pietro Ronzoni, a landscape painter of international renown active in Verona, that he took up landscape painting. The first views were not produced until 1815, after a short stay in Venice. After making his debut at the Fine Art Exposition at the Brera Academy of 1818, he made a long journey through Spain, the Netherlands and France for study purposes.

The set of 13 landscapes shown at the Expositions at the Brera in 1831 proved a great success with the public and critics alike, not least due to the fame achieved in Paris with works exhibited in the Salons, commissions from Louis Philippe of Orleans and the award of a gold medal in 1830. He returned to Milan in 1832 and devoted his energies to urban views characterised by an interest in the events of contemporary life and an atmospheric form of portrayal in evident competition with Giovanni Migliara. Landscape came to predominate as from 1835 with subjects drawn from the Lombard countryside and lakes. The focus on poor and humble aspects of life formed part of the artist’s fundamental naturalism and coincided with a moralistic approach derived from the novelist Alessandro Manzoni. Crucial importance attaches in the artist’s mature period to his trip to Rome and Naples in 1838–39.

Among his pupils or painters influenced by Canela were Felice Giuseppe Vertua, Constantino Prinetti, and Giovanni Renica. His son, Giuseppe Canella the Younger (Venice, 1837 - Padoa, 1913), was also a painter.

== Works ==
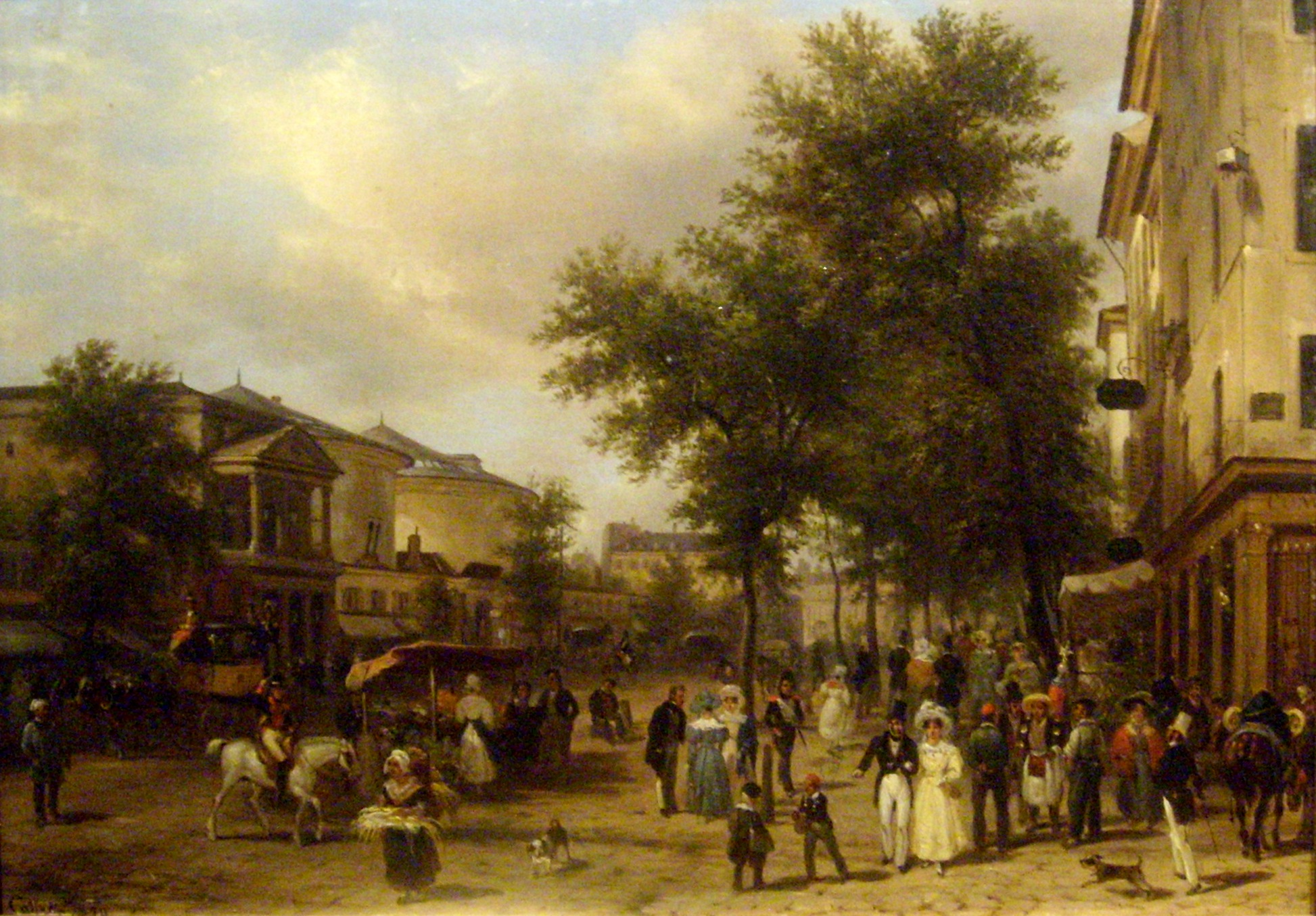
Boulevard Montmartre, Paris, 1830

Among his works are:

- Views of Paris and the Boulevards
- Cathedral of Milan
- Harbor at Honfleur
- Basilica of Santa Croce, Florence
- New Street in Venice
- View of a Village—moonlight

== Other projects ==
Media related to Giuseppe Canella (1788) at Wikimedia Commons
