= Self-Portrait Aged 71 =

Painting by Francesco Hayez

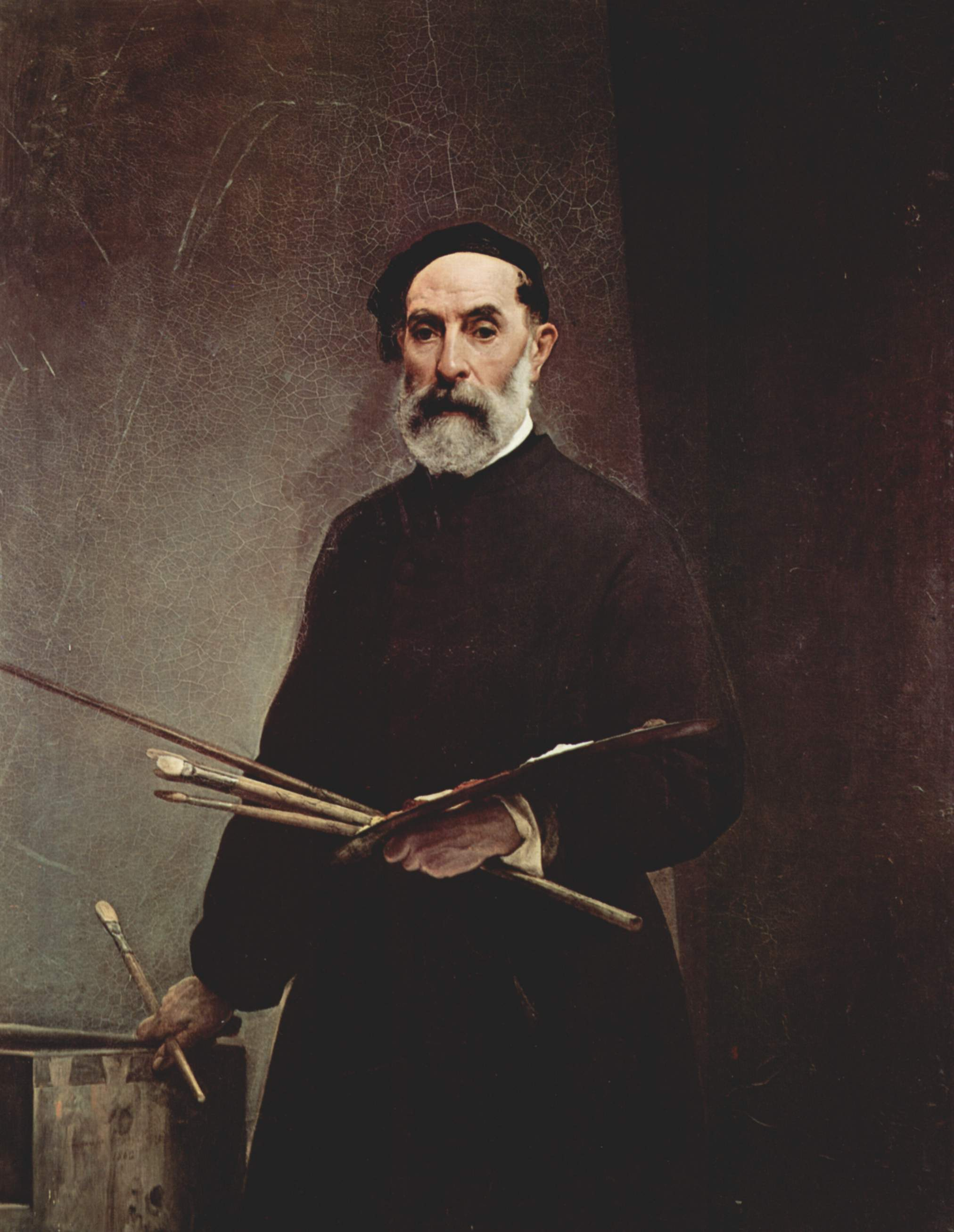
- Artist: Francesco Hayez
- Year: 1862
- Medium: oil on canvas
- Dimensions: 125.5 cm × 101.5 cm (49.4 in × 40.0 in)
- Location: Uffizi; Florence

Self-Portrait Aged 71 is an 1862 oil-on-canvas painting by the Italian artist Francesco Hayez. The Uffizi had been requesting a self-portrait from him since 1858 via Andrea Appiani's daughter-in-law Giuseppina Appiani Strigelli and it finally arrived in 1863. It is still in the Uffizi's Vasari Corridor.

At this period Hayez emphasised Risorgimento themes and became a symbol of the new unified Italy. The work is still in its original 19th-century frame, gilded with pure gold leaf. It is signed and dated "Francesco Hayez Venezia 1862" at bottom left. It was included in the 1975 Milan exhibition Mostra dei Maestri di Brera: (1776–1859).

Other Self-Portraits by the Artist

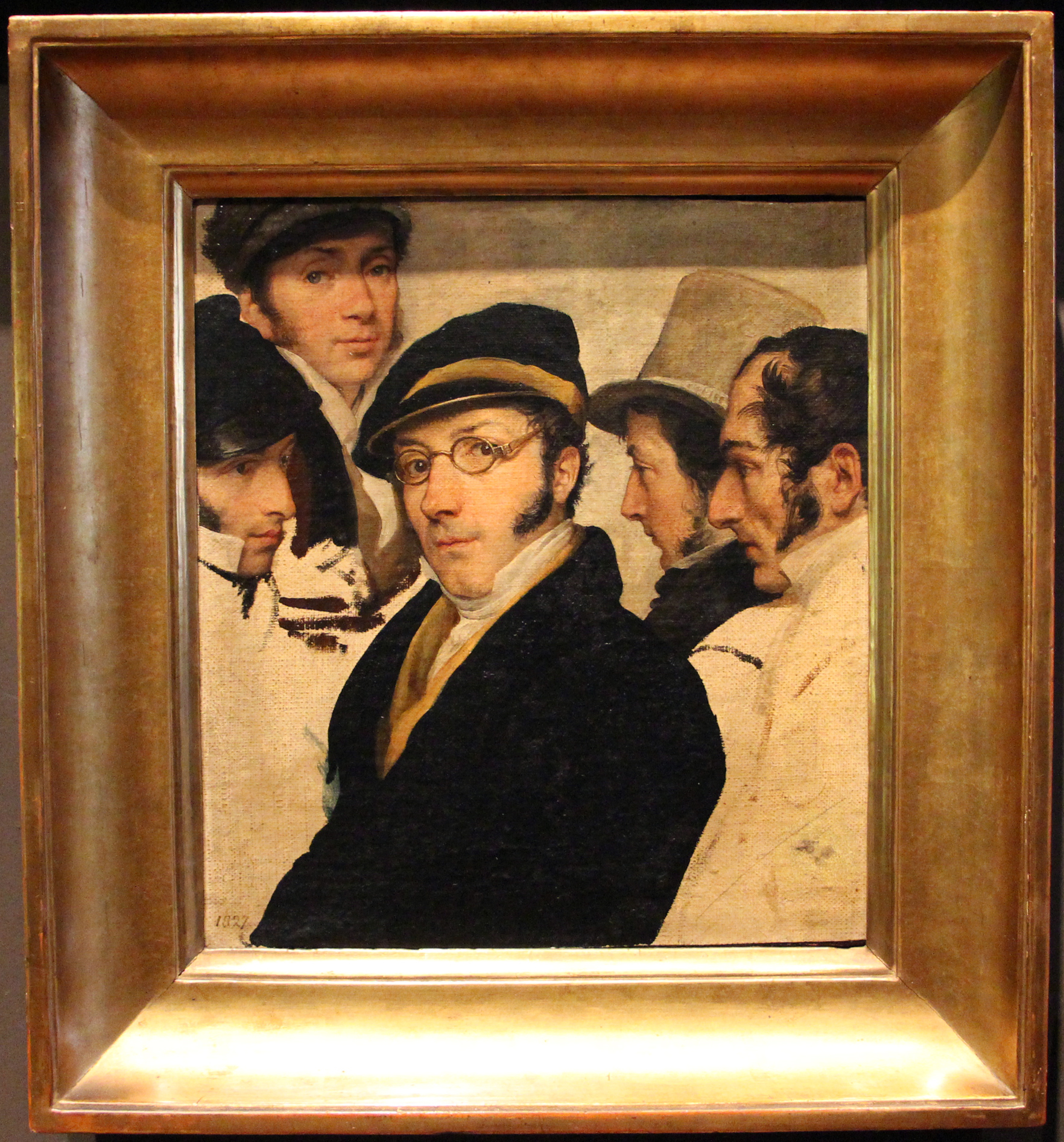
Francesco Hayez, Self-Portrait in a Group of Friends, circa 1824, Museo Poldi Pezzoli (Milan)

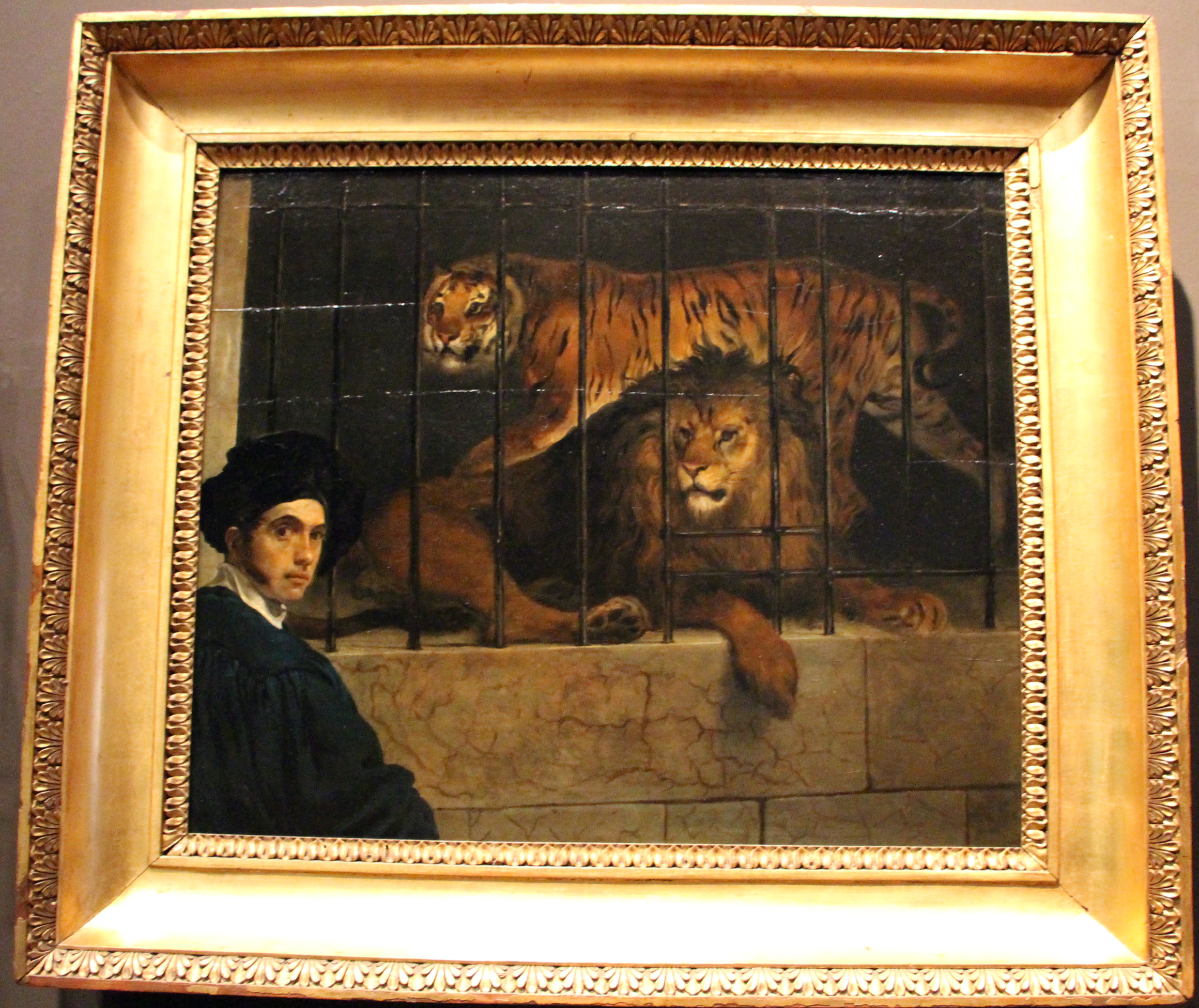
Francesco Hayez, Self-Portrait with a Lion and a Tiger in a Cage, circa 1830, Museo Poldi Pezzoli, (Milan)

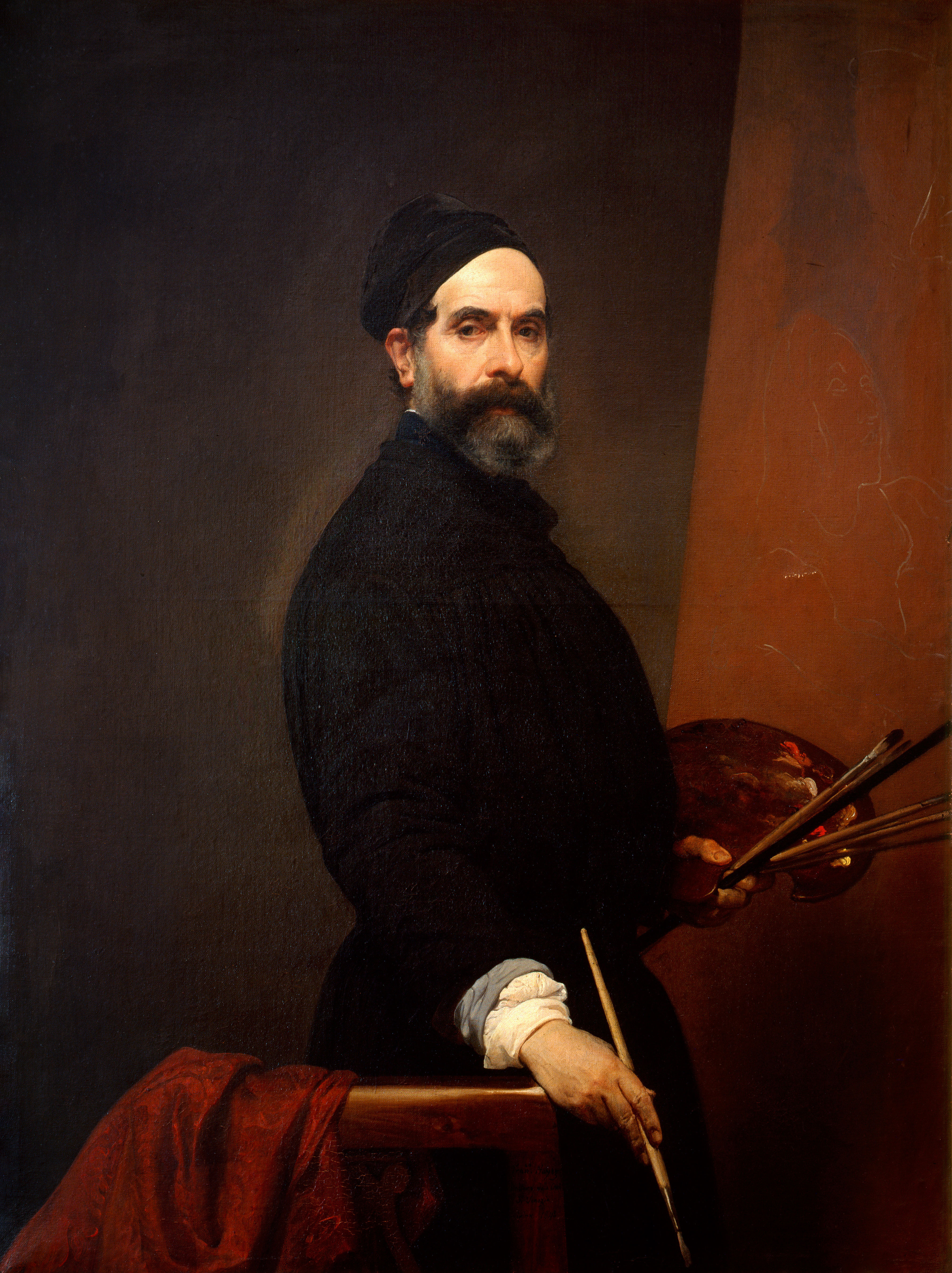
Francesco Hayez, Self-Portrait Aged 57, Pinacoteca di Brera (Milan)

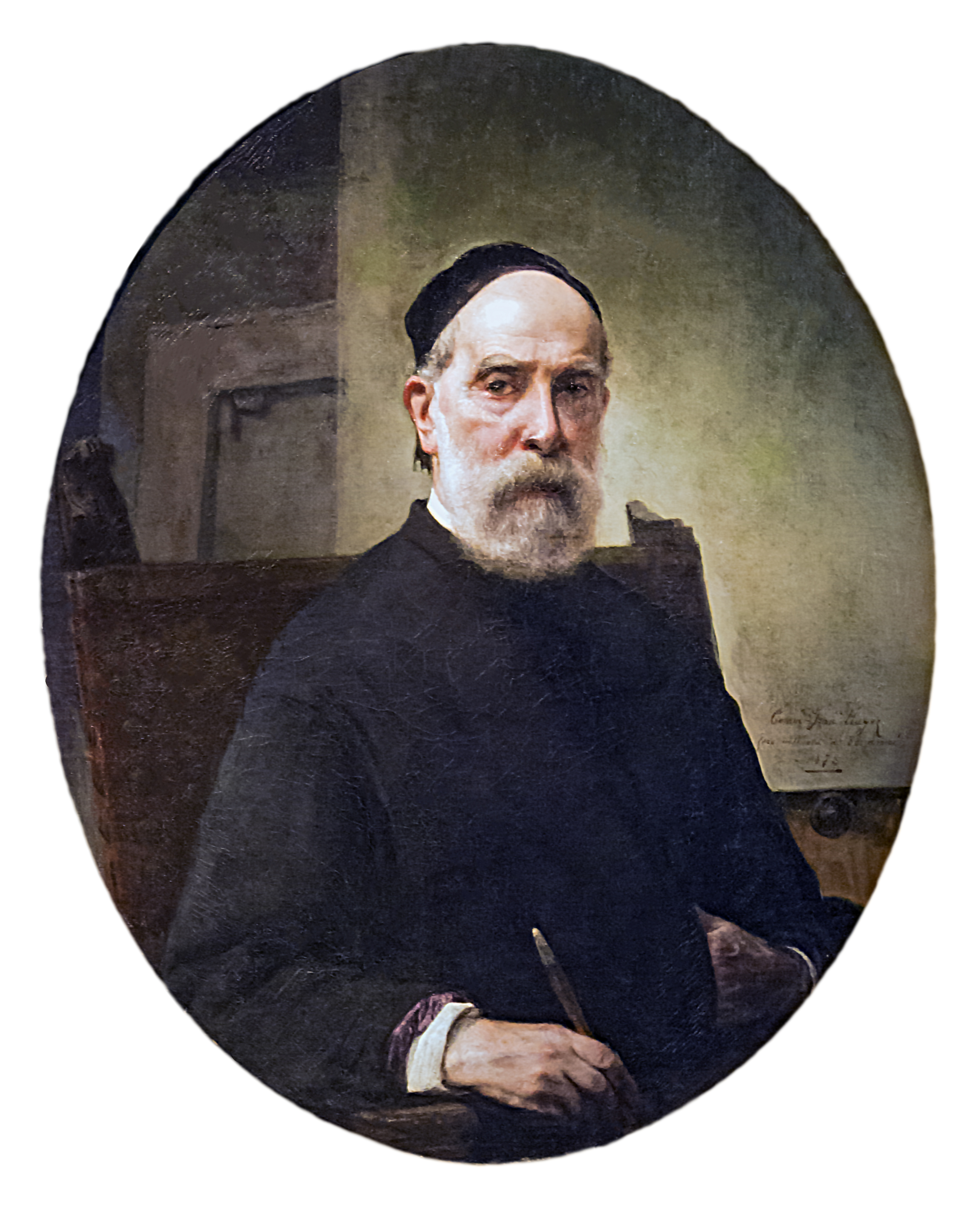
Francesco Hayez, Self-Portrait Aged 88, Galleria internazionale d'arte moderna (Venice)

== Bibliography (in Italian) ==
- Giorgio Nicodemi (ed.), Francesco Hayez, Milano, Ceschina, SBN IT\ICCU\LIA\0128630.
- Sergio Coradeschi, L'opera completa di Hayez, Milano, Rizzoli, 1971, SBN IT\ICCU\RAV\0053262.
- Gallerie degli Uffizi, Gli Uffizi: Catalogo generale, Firenze, Centro Di, 1980, p. 895 [1979], SBN IT\ICCU\RAV\0060995.
- Fernando Mazzocca, Francesco Hayez: catalogo ragionato, Milano, F. Motta, 1994, SBN IT\ICCU\MIL\0236634.
- Fernando Mazzocca (ed.), Francesco Hayez, Cinisello Balsamo-Torino, Silvana-Intesa Sanpaolo, 2015, SBN IT\ICCU\MOD\1652209. Catalogo della Mostra tenuta a Milano nel 2015-2016
