= Pietro Ronzoni =

Italian painter (1781–1861)

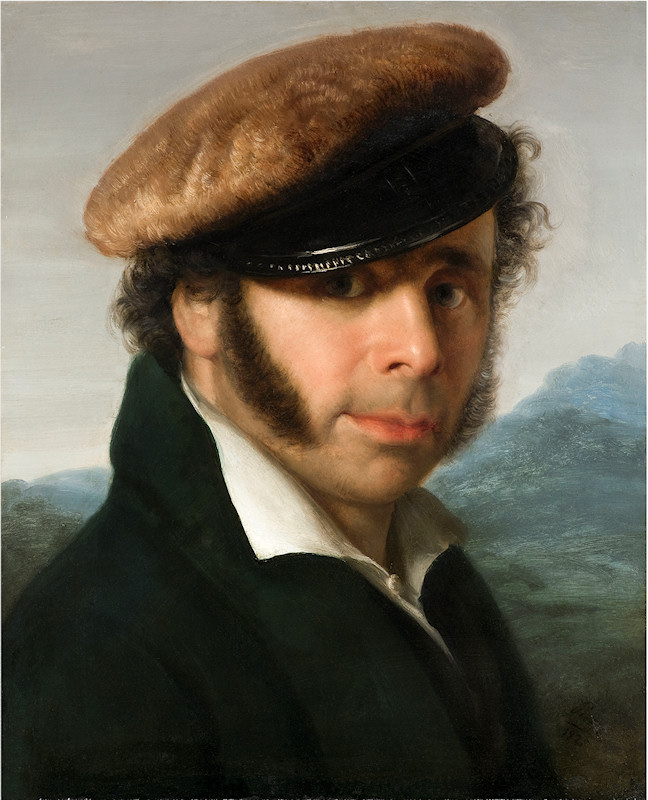
Giovanni Carnovali, Ritratto di Pietro Ronzoni, 1825 (Fondazione Cariplo)

Pietro Ronzoni (1781 in Sedrina, Bergamo – 1861 in Bergamo) was an Italian painter.

== Biography ==
Trained in Rome under the guidance of the landscape painter Luigi Campovecchio from Mantua, Ronzoni met Angelica Kauffman and Antonio Canova and formed friendships with numerous artists, including Pelagio Palagi, Martin Verstappen and Hendrik Voogd. After his master’s death, he became a follower and friend of François Marius Granet. He returned to Bergamo in 1809, working as a set designer and producing a number of urban views and landscapes, painted from life but still informed by the classical ideal. He was appointed professor at the Carrara Academy, whose director Giuseppe Diotti was a close friend as well as an associate in professional undertakings. Having moved to Verona in 1815, he established himself as a successful landscape painter with a cultured international clientele. Influenced from the outset by the French school of landscape painting, his work saw a shift towards a more atmospheric approach as from 1840 with the adoption of soft, hazy brushstrokes. This mature production displays the influence of Giuseppe Canella’s models on the one hand and Piccio’s innovative painting on the other. Ronzoni shunned the Brera exhibitions systematically and is known to have taken part only in the Prima Esposizione Italiana, held in Florence in 1861.

== Other projects ==
Media related to Pietro Ronzoni at Wikimedia Commons
