= Lorenzo Gignous =

Italian painter

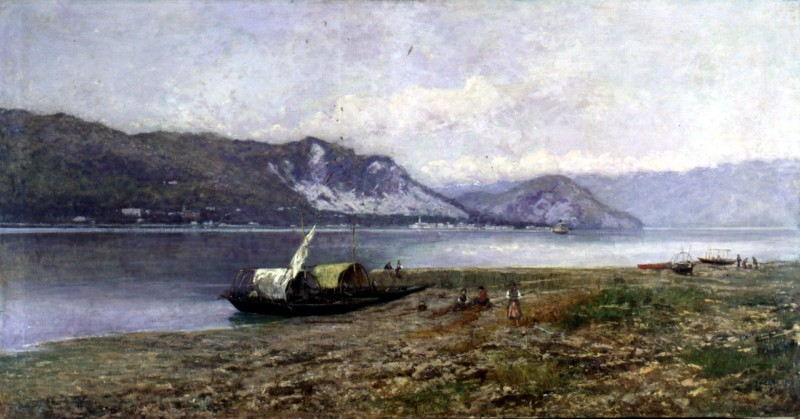
Veduta del Lago Maggiore, 1885 ca. (Art collections of Fondazione Cariplo)

Lorenzo Gignous (1862–1958) was an Italian painter known especially for his landscapes.

== Biography ==
He was born in Modena. The nephew of the painter Eugenio Gignous, Lorenzo studied at the Brera Academy and was awarded the Mylius Prize for historic landscape painting there in 1884. The artists were free to choose their subject that year, and he presented a view of Sesto Calende on Lake Maggiore, where Garibaldi and the regiments of Alpine chasseurs disembarked in May 1859. This landscape became a recurrent subject and indeed a characteristic theme of all his strongly naturalistic oeuvre. He took part in the major national exhibitions of the period and soon established himself as a landscape painter with a repertoire of views of Lake Maggiore painted from life during stays at Stresa with Eugenio Gignous, who settled there with his family in 1887.

Gignous combined his activities as a painter until 1922 with employment for the Italian Railway, which enabled him to obtain important commissions for public works. He died in 1958 in Porto Ceresio, Varese.

== Bibliography ==
- Elena Lissoni, Lorenzo Gignous, online catalogue Artgate by Fondazione Cariplo, 2010, CC BY-SA (source for the first revision of this article).
