= Carlo Canella =

Italian painter (1800–1879)

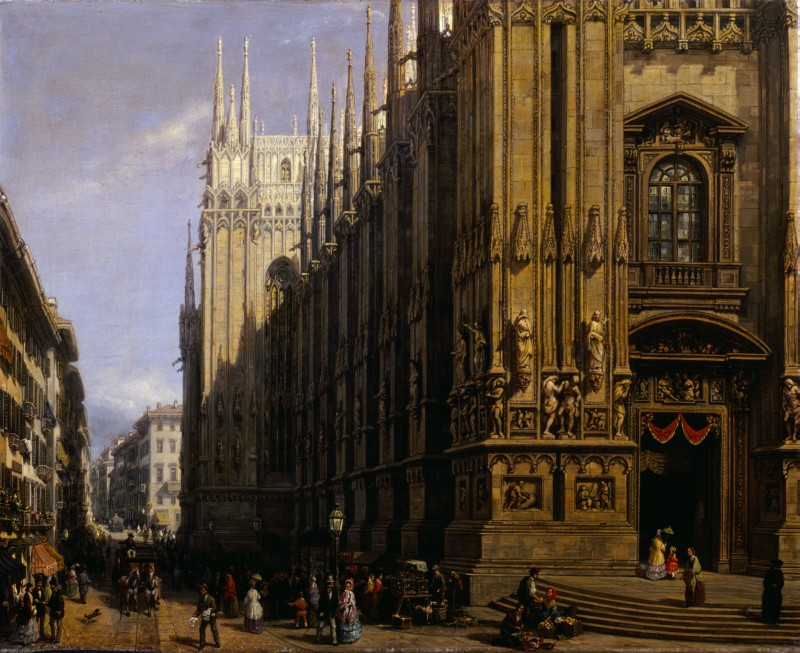
Il Duomo di Milano e la Corsia dei Servi, 1860–1865 (Fondazione Cariplo)

Carlo Canella (1800 in Verona – 1879 in Milan) was an Italian painter.

== Biography ==
Having received his artistic training from his father Giovanni, a decorator and set designer, Canella took part in the Brera exhibitions on a regular basis as from 1829 with urban views, portraits and genre scenes of a Neo-Flemish character. He also painted the occasional landscape but came to specialise in perspective views of various Italian cities, especially Milan and Verona, under the influence of his elder brother Giuseppe in the mid-1830s. He settled in Milan definitively in 1842 but continued to send works to Verona for exhibitions. The artist's mature work saw a weary repetition of the same subjects, often based on his brother's more successful models, as well as lively genre scenes of an anecdotal character presented in Oporto at the International Exhibition of 1865 and Naples at the Esposizione Nazionale di Napoli of 1877.

== Other projects ==
Media related to Carlo Canella at Wikimedia Commons
