= Constantino Prinetti =

Italian painter (1830–1855)

Constantino Prinetti (1830–1855) was an Italian landscape painter.

He was born at Canobbio. After studying at the Milan Academy under Giuseppe Canella. He travelled in Germany, the Netherlands, Paris, Normandy, England, and Scotland. He died at Milan. Among his works are:

- The Brienzer See (1853 and 1855)
- The Battlefield of Näfels (1854), engraved by Salathé.
- Dundas Castle
- The Thames and Houses of Parliament Street in Edinburgh
- Street in Edinburgh
- Valsasina
- November Sun on Lago Maggiore
- Monte di Colico
- Grotto of Catullus on Lago di Garda
- View of Edinburgh (1855)
