= Guido Ricci =

Italian painter (1837–1897)

Guido Ricci (1837–1897) was an Italian painter, mainly painting landscapes and rural genre scenes.

== Biography ==
He was born in Casorate, and died in Milan. He was a pupil of Gaetano Fasanotti. He painted landscapes, mostly in the shores of Ticino.

He exhibited two oil canvases at the Exhibition of Fine Arts in Mantua in 1860: La vita de'Campi and Il Pascolo. In 1862 at the Exposition of Milan he exhibited San Giovanni Bianco (Valle Brembana), and Campagna Lombarda. In 1877 at the Exhibition of Naples, he sent Cantiere sulle rivo del Po and Rive del Ticino. In 1881 at the Milan Exposition of Fine Arts, he displayed four landscapes depicting: Mattino; Ritorno al molino; Le lavandaie, and La preghiera of the sera. In the 1883 Milan Exposition, he exhibited la Primavera and Lago Maggiore da un altipiano; at Rome, the same year, he displayed Mulino. In 1885 at the Exposition in Florence, he sent Vecchio porto, Lago di Garda and La Marina, Riviera di Ponente; in 1886, he exhibited in Milan Cortiletto rustico.
