= Self-Portrait in a Group of Friends =

1820s painting by Francesco Hayez

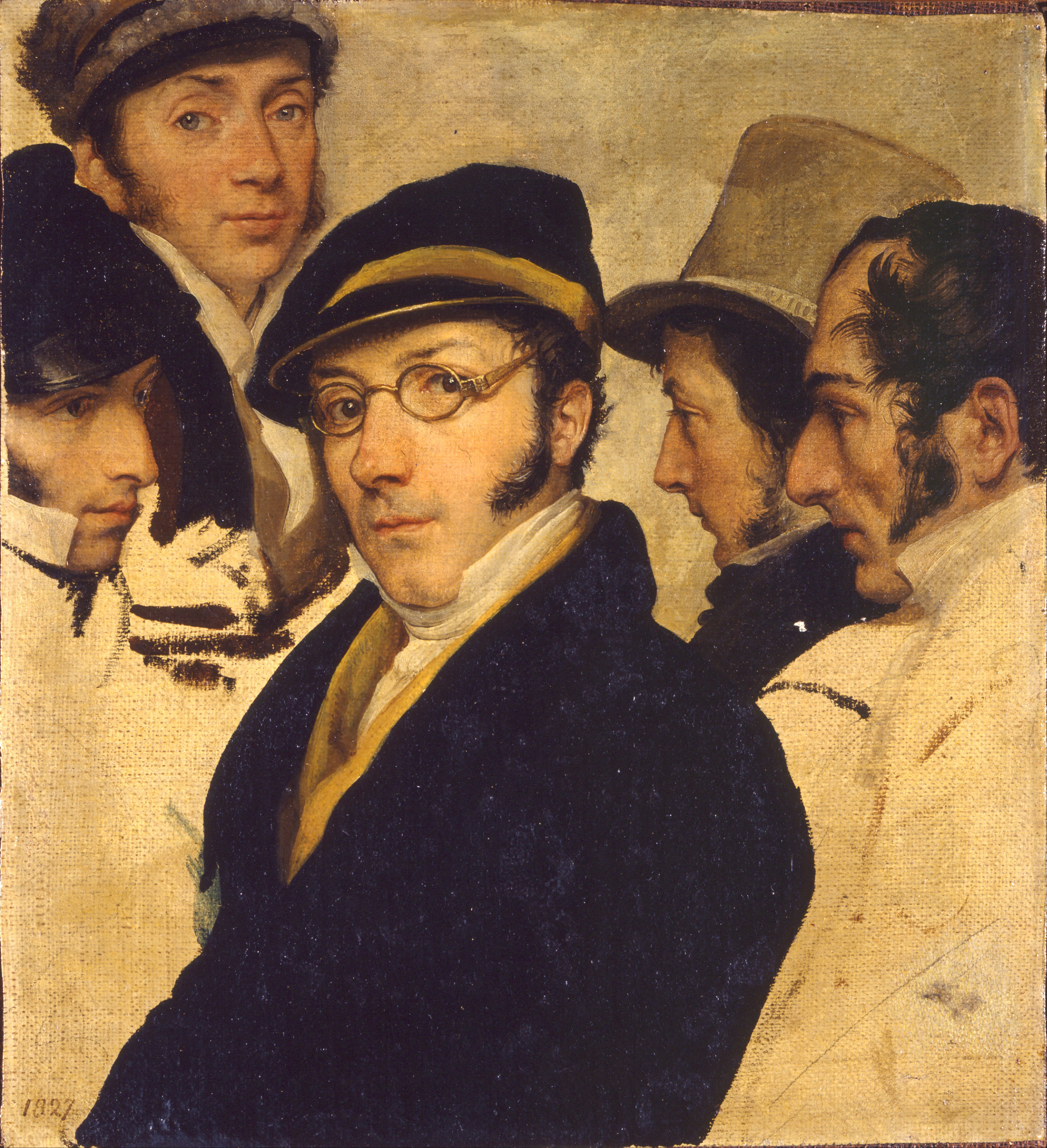
Self-Portrait in a Group of Friends (1824 or 1827) by Francesco Hayez

Self-Portrait in a Group of Friends is an 1824 or 1827 oil-on-canvas painting by the Italian artist Francesco Hayez, now in the Museo Poldi Pezzoli in Milan. The other people in the painting have been identified as (starting from the left): the painters Giovanni Migliara, Pelagio Palagi, and Giuseppe Molteni, and the scholar Tommaso Grossi.

== History ==
The work is mentioned in Prospetto delle incisioni, quadri e oggetti d'arte a un prezzo d'acquisto (1853) as a "picture by Hayez in oils representing five portraits". It was first exhibited to the public in 1883 as part of a monographic show of the artist's work, but then remained in a private collection until 1996, when it was left to its present owner on the death of Riccardo Lampugnani, who had obtained it from his grandfather Giuseppe Gargantini.

Peculiar is Hayez's choice to portray himself in a self-portrait that differs significantly from the usual portraiture of the nineteenth century. It is in fact a "portrait of friendship", in which the painter is surrounded by four associates and companions. Grossi, Molteni, Magliara and Pelagi were all exponents of the romantic style; their identity has been known since 1983 thanks to the analysis of Fernando Mazzocca, a scholar of Hayez. In the lower left corner, the painting bears a "1827" written in pen, although this has traditionally not been recognized as an autograph, and the debate on the dating of the painting is still open.

The painting's composition, close viewpoint, and the artist's three-quarter pose facing the observer show the influence of the Self-Portrait in a Circle of Friends from Mantua executed by Peter Paul Rubens in 1602–1604. From a technical point of view, the Self-Portrait in a Group of Friends is characterized by the contrast between the faces of the portrayed, meticulously defined (on Hayez's face you can even glimpse the hair behind the shaved mustache), and the "unfinished" treatment of the clothes and bodies of Hayez's companions.
