= Gignoux =

Gignoux may refer to:

== Places ==
- Pointe Maurice Gignoux (or Pointe de la Fournache), a mountain of Savoie, France

== People ==
- Anna Barbara Gignoux (1725-1796), German business person
- Claude-Joseph Gignoux (1890-1968), French politician
- Edward Thaxter Gignoux (1916–1988), United States federal judge
- Ernest Gignoux (1874–1955), American fencer
- Françoise Gignoux (born 1923), French former alpine skier
- Maurice Gignoux (1881–1955), French geologist
- Pierre Gignoux (b. 1967), French ski mountaineer
- Régis François Gignoux (1816–1882), French painter active in the United States from 1840 to 1870

== See also ==
- Gignous, a surname
