= Leonardo Bazzaro =

Italian painter (1853–1937)

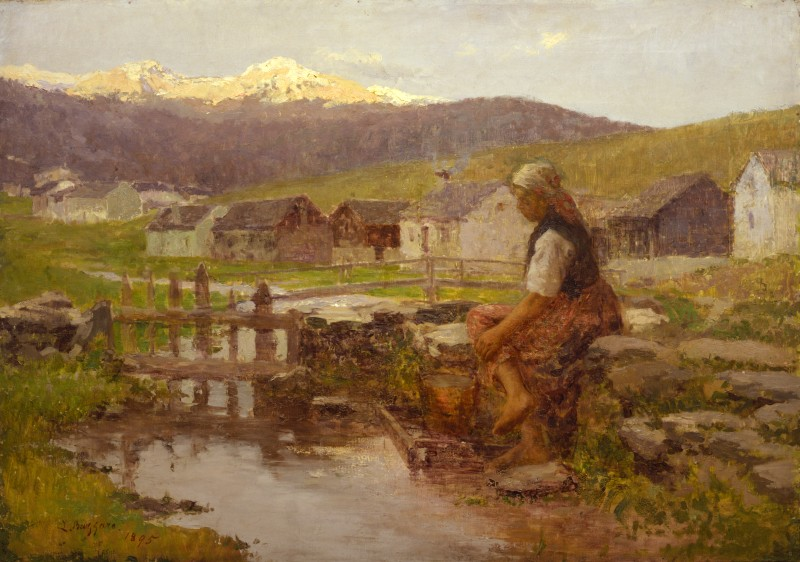
Cabins in Macugnaga, 1895 (Fondazione Cariplo)

Leonardo Bazzaro (Italian pronunciation: [leoˈnardo badˈdzaːro, -tˈts-]; 1853–1937) was an Italian painter mainly of landscapes and interior vedute.

== Biography ==
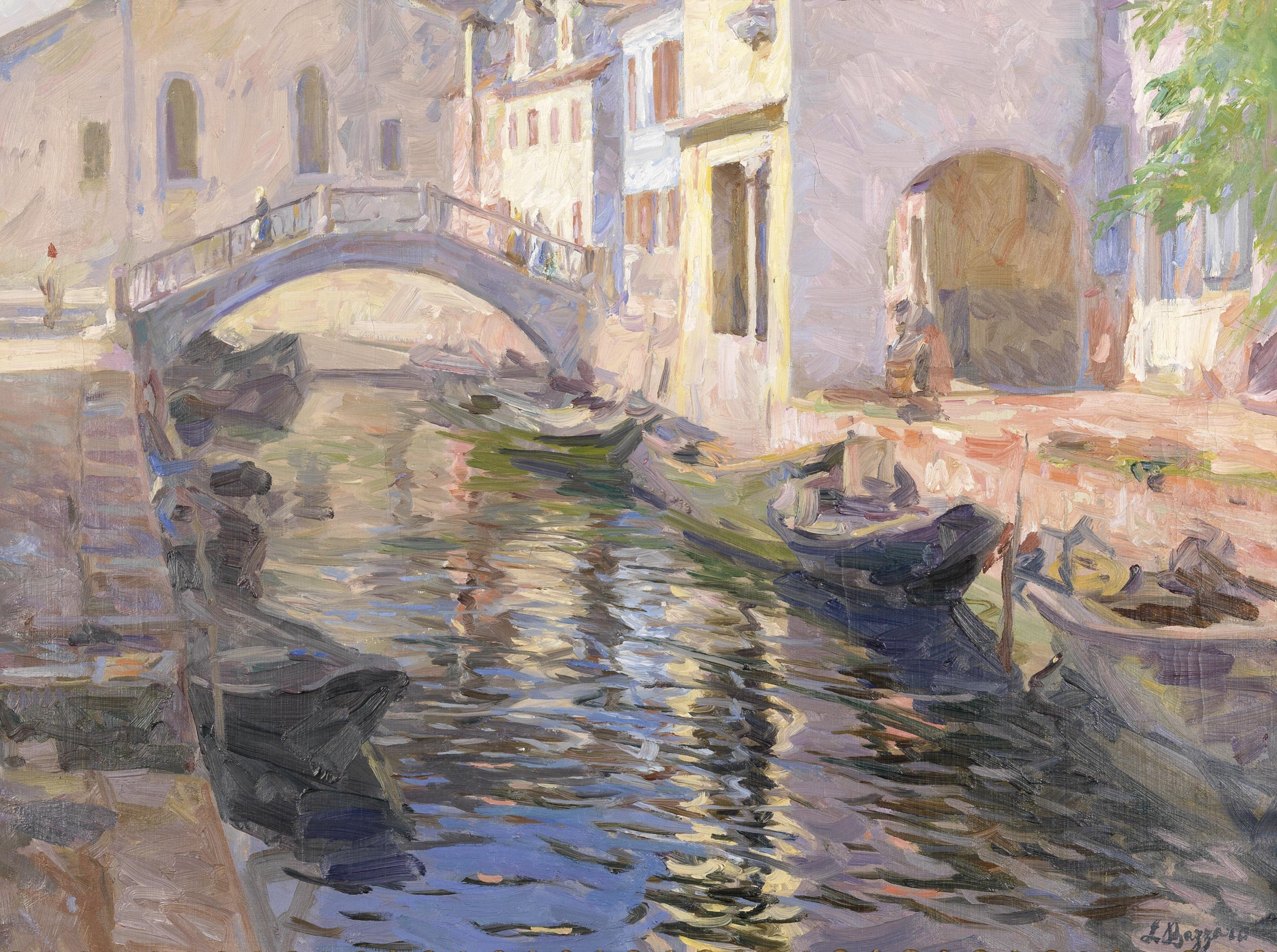
Canal in Venice

He was born in Milan. After picking up the basics in the studio of the painter Gaetano Fasanotti, Bazzaro enrolled at the Brera Academy in Milan, where he was awarded the Fumagalli Prize in 1875. He painted a series of perspective views set in Milanese churches and mansions. Among his works during the years 1881 to 1887 are the Interior of the Church of the Carmine, (Brera), Interior of the Choir of San Vittore, Interior of Sala Verri, The Ponte dei Sospiri, Investiture of Monks in Monastery, Canal near Corsico, and Scena sul Naviglio.

The success achieved with the public and critics alike at a number of major national and international events prompted him to take an interest also in portraiture and in both rural landscape and cityscape painting; for the latter, his favorite settings were Venice and Chioggia. The works of the 1880s and 1890s also include increasingly intimate scenes of everyday life in the setting of Valsassina, Valle d’Aosta and Verbano. Bazzaro continued to take part in numerous exhibitions in the region of Lombardy as well as the Venice Biennale and the Rome Quadrenniale right up to his death, always achieving great success with collectors and being asked to execute replicas of his most popular subjects.

His brother Ernesto Bazzaro was a sculptor.

== Main paintings ==
- Il duello (1878)
- La vestizione della monaca (1888)
- Il duello (1878)
- Ponte di Chioggia (1889)
- Pace di naufraghi (1897)
- Marina di Chioggia (1900)
- Dopo il naufragio (1906)

== Exhibitions ==
Two exhibitions in 2011 presented works of Bazzaro:

- "Leonardo Bazzaro e i grandi maestri del Naturalismo lombardo (1870–1900)" in Galleria Bottegantica, Milan
- "Leonardo Bazzaro. Itinerario pittorico tra la Valle d’Aosta e la Laguna Veneta (1900–1930)" in Galleria Ambrosiana, Milan
