= Felice Giuseppe Vertua =

Italian painter (1820–1862)

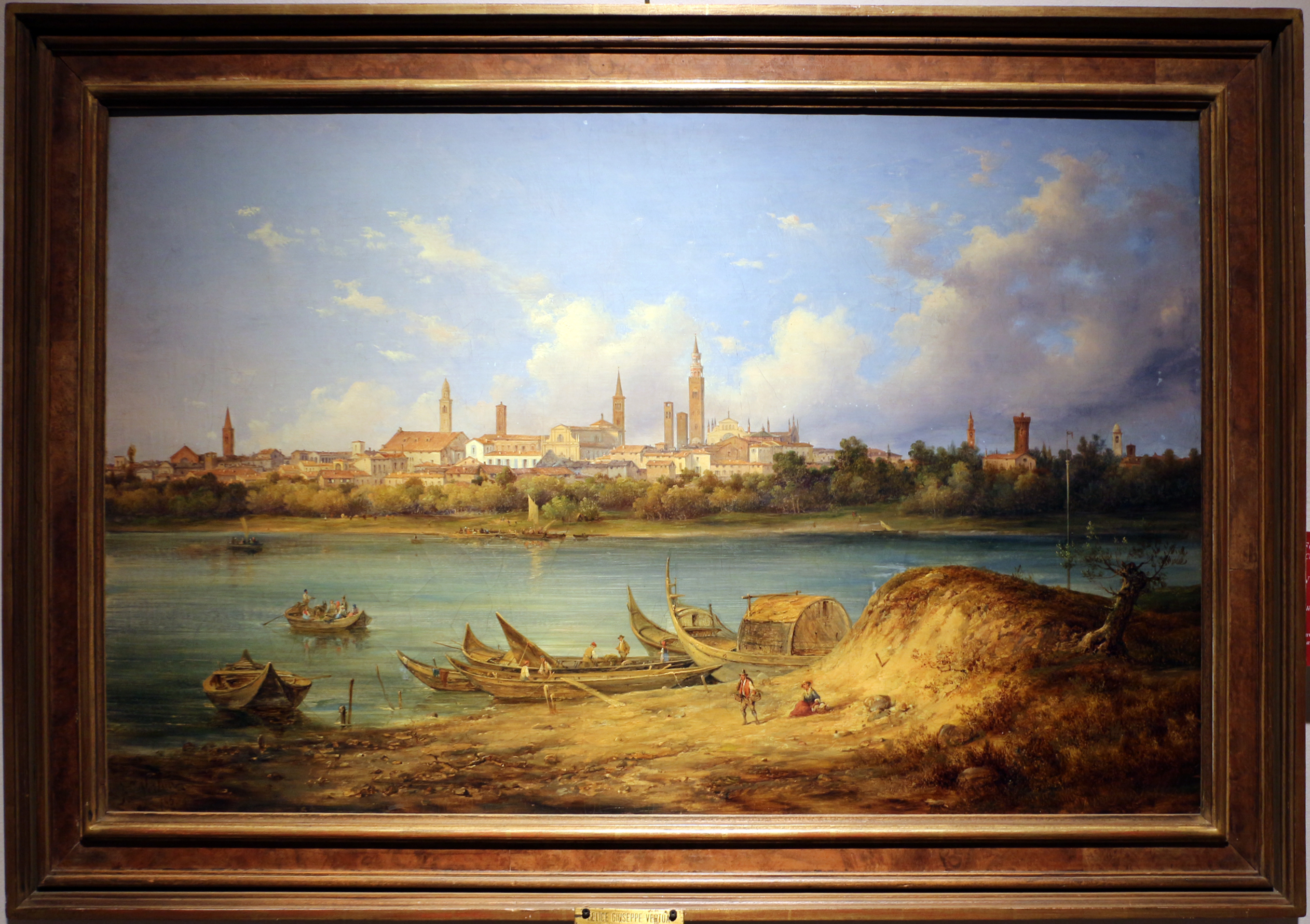
View of Cremona by Felice Giuseppe Vertua

Felice Giuseppe Vertua (1820 - 1862) was an Italian painter. Vertua painted vedute with genre scenes and views of Cremona.

He was born and died in Cremona. We know little of his early training, but he became a follower of the painter Giuseppe Canella.
