= Gaetano Fasanotti =

Italian painter

Gaetano Fasanotti (1831–1882) was an Italian painter.

He was born and died in Milan. He trained under Giovanni Renica and was named professor of landscape painting to the Academy of Brera. Among his pupils were Guido Ricci, Eugenio Gignous and Leonardo Bazzaro.
