= Giovanni Renica =

Italian painter (1808–1884)

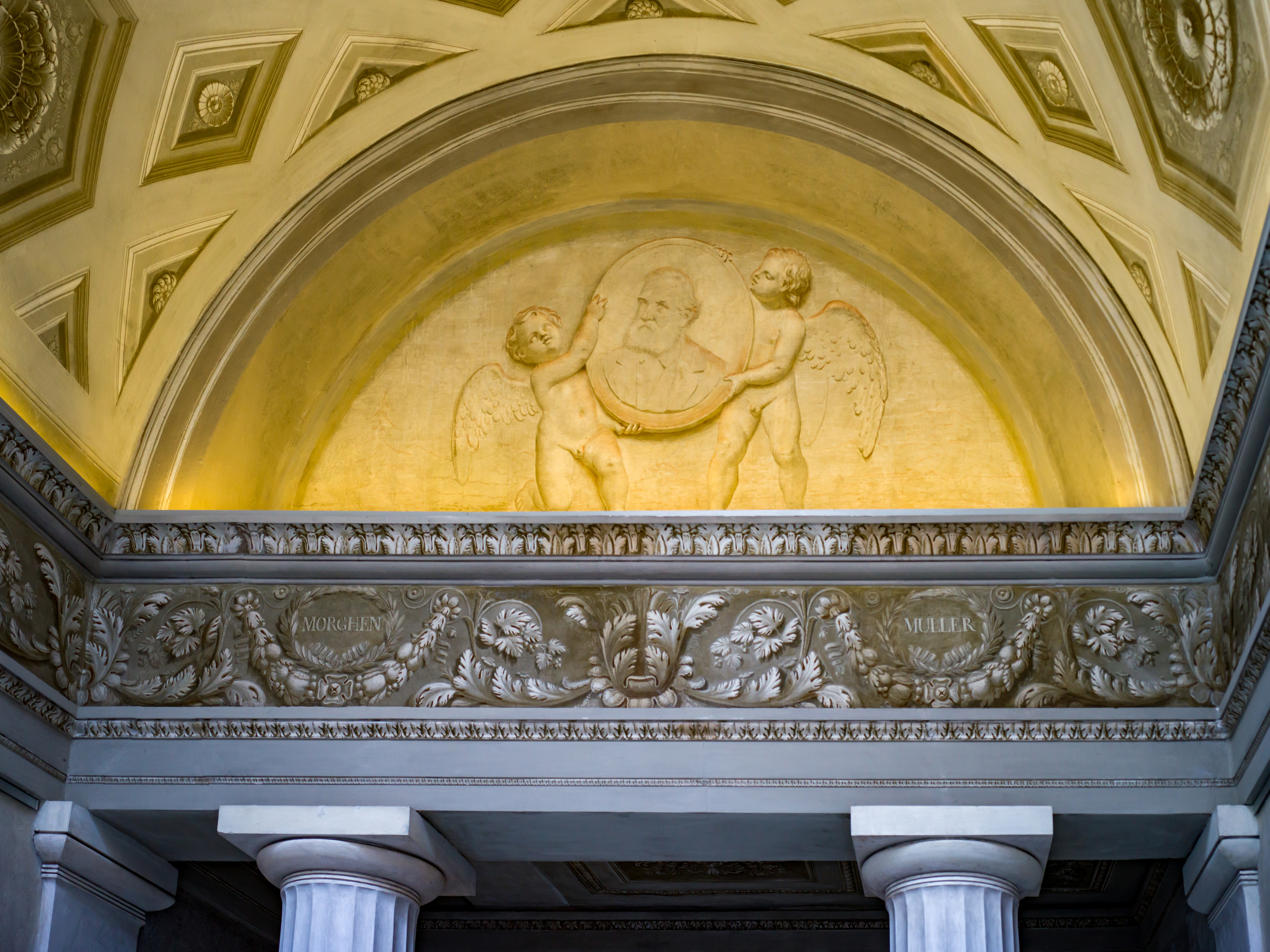
Portrait of Giovanni Renica in the Palazzo Tosio in Brescia.

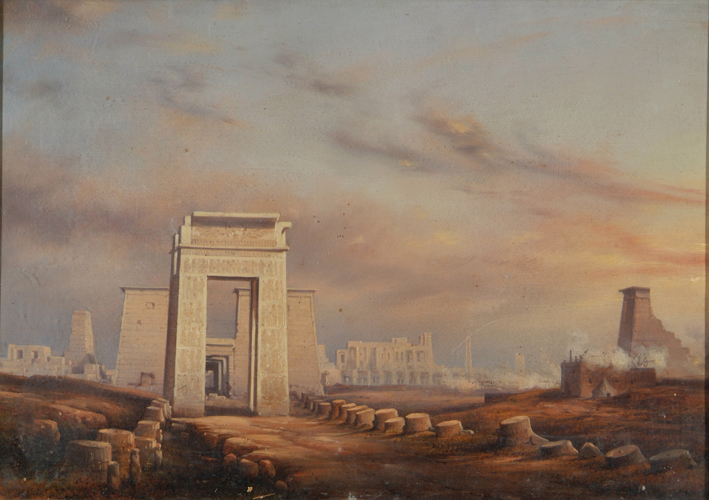
The Temple of Ramses III at Medinet Habu

Giovanni Renica (1808 – 1884) was an Italian painter, active in a Romantic style.

He was born in Montirone in the province of Brescia, and died in Brescia. He was a pupil of Giovanni Migliara. He became a teacher at the Brera Academy. He made a trip to the Orient, which gave him inspiration. He left his notes to the Atheneum of Brescia. Among his pupils was Gaetano Fasanotti.
