= Giovanni Migliara =

Italian painter (1785–1837)

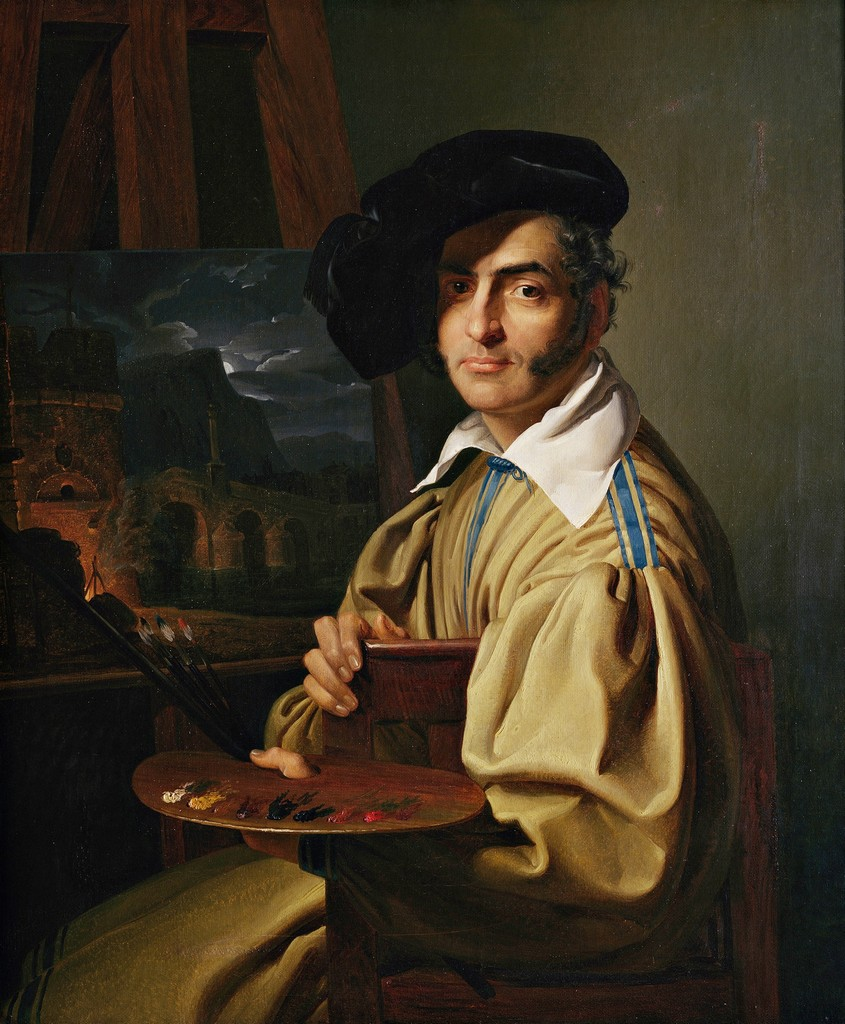
- Portrait of Giovanni Migliara (1829); Painted by Giuseppe Molteni
- Born: October 15, 1785; Alessandria, Italy
- Died: April 18, 1837 (aged 51); Milan, Italy
- Known for: Painting
- Movement: Romanticism

Giovanni Migliara (October 15, 1785 – April 18, 1837) was a nobleman and Italian painter active at the beginning of the 19th century, painting vedute and history paintings.

== Biography ==
Born to artisan parents of limited means, he was apprenticed to the sculptor Giuseppe Maria Bonzanigo. He also studied at the Brera Academy with Giocondo Albertolli and began his career as a set designer in the Teatro Carcano (1804) and La Scala (1805 - 1809), under the direction of Alessandro Sanquirico.

Due to a serious lung disorder, he stopped working for a time. Then, from 1810, he began painting again (mostly miniatures) in watercolours and oils on different media, (canvas, silk, and ivory). He made his return to the art world with an exhibition of four cityscapes at the Brera Academy in 1812.

While the Milanese painting scene was dominated by neoclassic painters Andrea Appiani and Luigi Sabatelli, Giovanni Migliara stayed with the historical themes and medieval subtlety of romanticism. With his improved technique, his choice of subjects, and the quality of his work, he became a favorite of the Milanese aristocracy. In 1822, he was named Professor at the Brera Academy and, in 1833, he was named court painter for King Charles Albert of Sardinia, after being presented with the Civil Order of Savoy.

As well as his historical canvases, he produced a number of church interiors in a topographical style. He was also the author of Trattato di geometria descrittiva, published in 1813.

Among his pupils were Giovanni Renica of Brescia, Luigi Bisi, and Federico Moja.

== Selected paintings ==
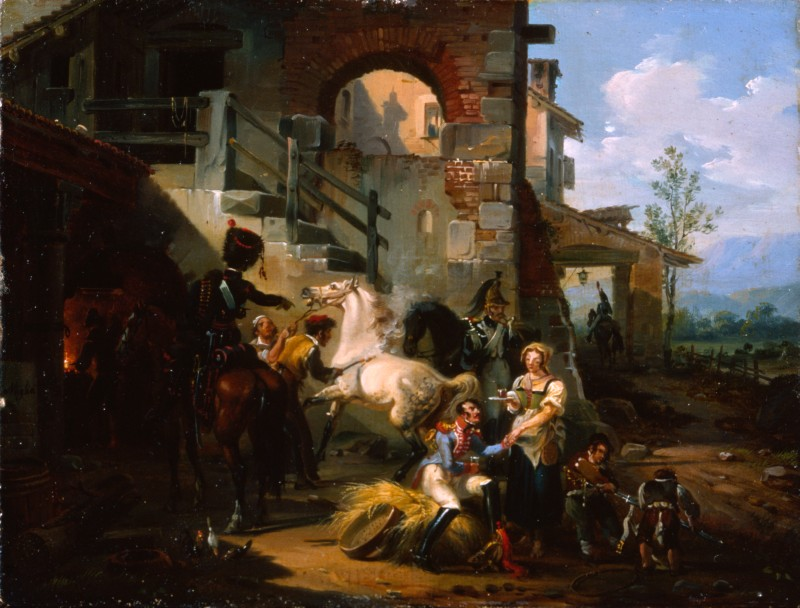
Landscape with Horses

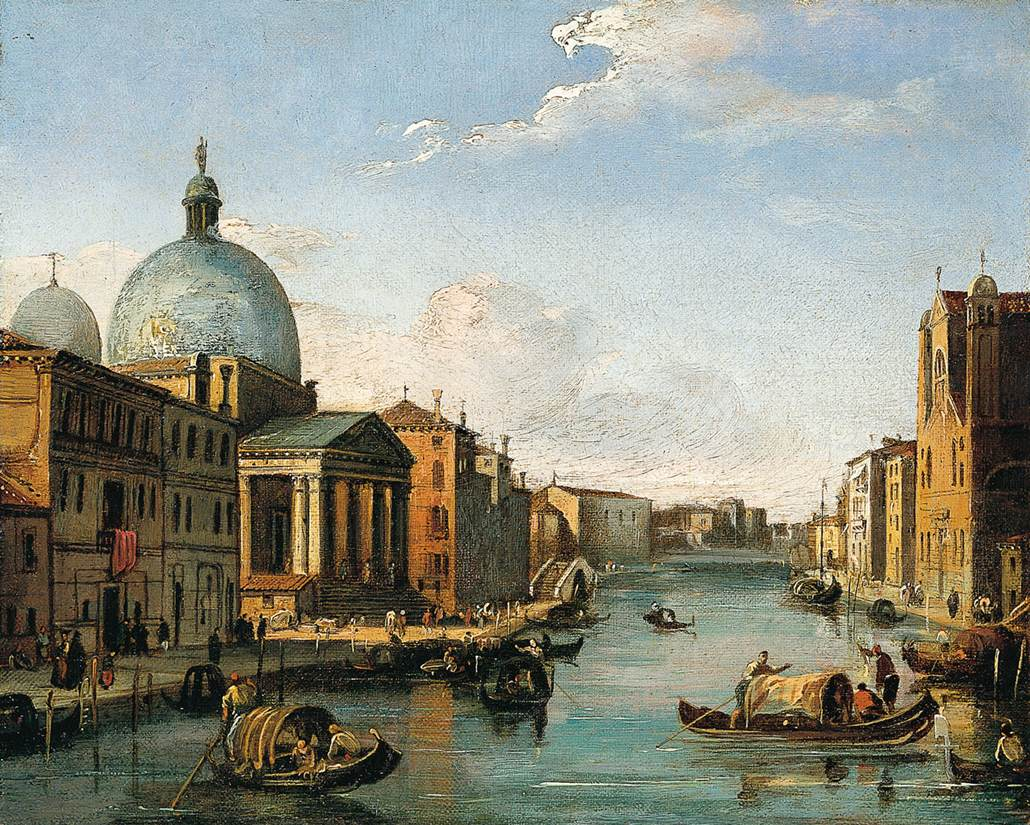
Veduta of Venice

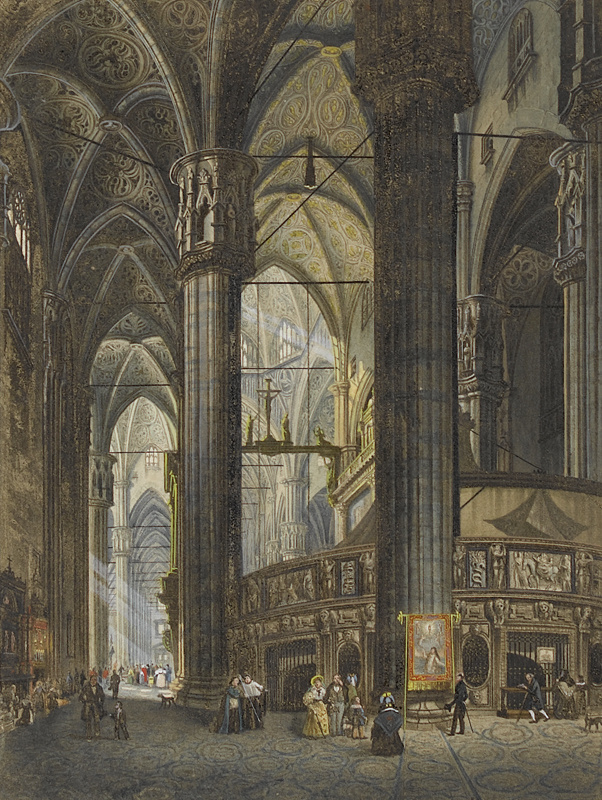
Interior View of Milan Cathedral

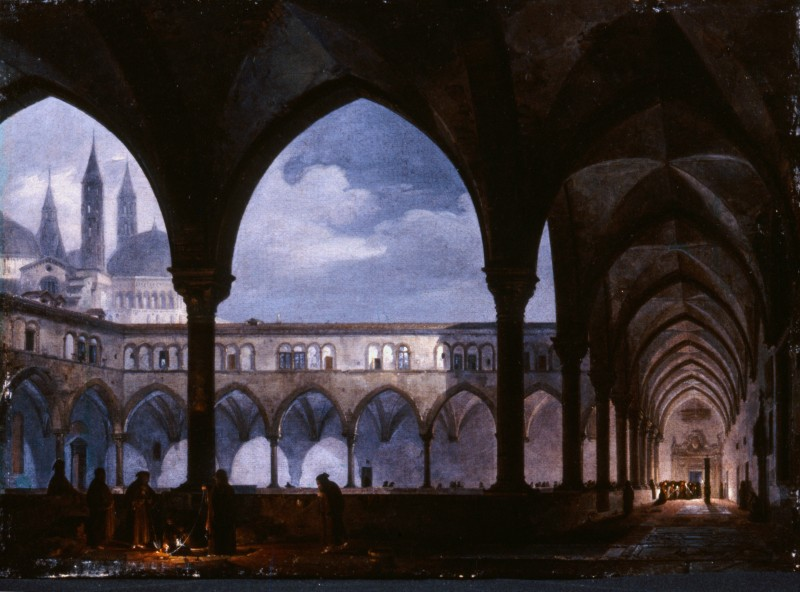
View of the Cloister at the Basilica of Saint Anthony of Padua

== Works ==
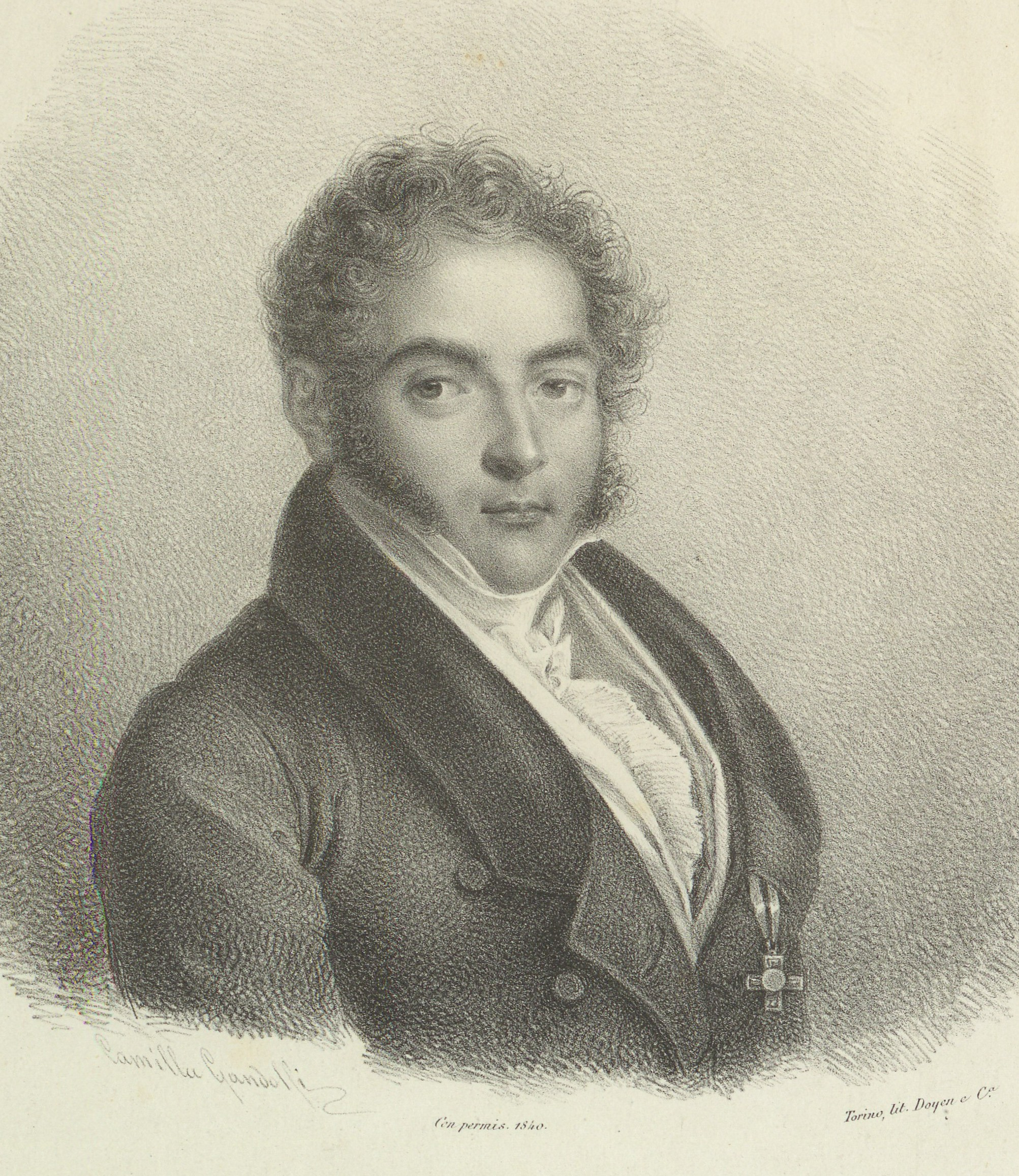
Portrait of Giovanni Migliara, 1840

- View of Campo San Giovanni e Paolo with the facade of the School of San Marco,
- Vedute from Rialto Bridge in Venice.
- Interior of the Church of San Lorenzo, Milan Museum.
- Via Fatabene Fratelli (1830), Milan.
- Portico of the Church of San Lorenzo (v.1814), Milan.
- Vestibule of a Convent (1833), Alexandria Art Gallery.
- Entrance to the Château de Plessis de la Tour (1833), Civic Modern Art Gallery, Turin.
- Confalonieri e Pellico alla applicazione del metodo Lancaster-Bell di mutuo insegnament, Museum of the Risorgimento (Turin)

== Bibliography ==
- Elena Lissoni, Giovanni Migliara, online catalogue Artgate by Fondazione Cariplo, 2010, CC BY-SA.
