= Eugenio Gignous =

Italian painter (1850–1906)

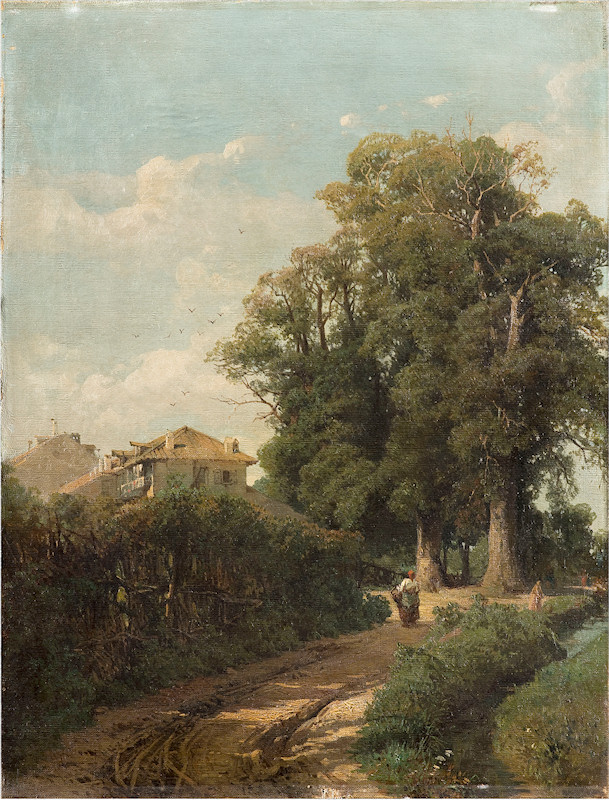
Dintorni di Milano o Lavandaie della Magolfa, 1870 (Fondazione Cariplo)

Eugenio Gignous (4 August 1850 – 30 August 1906) was an Austrian-born Italian painter. A recognised leader of the Lombard school of painting, he spent most of his life in Stresa (Verbania) and on the coast of Liguria, with long stays in Venice.

== Biography ==
=== Early life and education ===
The son of a silk merchant from Lyon, Gignous displayed a precocious talent for painting and enrolled at the Brera Academy of Fine Arts in 1864, attending the courses on landscape taught by Luigi Riccardi and then Gaetano Fasanotti. He came into contact with the Milanese Scapigliatura movement when still very young and formed a close friendship with Tranquillo Cremona.

Of Gignous’s early work, the portraits of the 1870s were influenced by the work of his friends among the Scapigliati, Tranquillo Cremona and Daniele Ranzoni. He began to focus exclusively on landscape in the 1870s, experimenting with painting en plein air and producing views of the Lombard and Piedmontese countryside that he showed at all the major national exhibitions.

Until he married in 1881, Gignous travelled and exhibited extensively, showing work at the 1873 Vienna World's Fair in 1873 and the Exposition Universelle in Paris in 1878. Important paintings from this period include Rustic Courtyard at Colombera (1870; Milan, Museo di Milano) and Flowers in the Cloister (Milan, Pinacoteca di Brera).

=== Mature work ===
The late 1870s saw a more naturalistic approach to landscape painting under the influence of Francesco Filippini and Filippo Carcano, with whom Gignous went to paint on Lake Maggiore in 1879, thus inaugurating a thematic repertoire devoted primarily to views of the Verbano, Mottarone and Val d’Ossola. During the 1880s Gignous also painted in Liguria and in Venice, exhibiting his work successfully (e.g. Calm, 1884; Rome, Galleria Nazionale d'Arte Moderna). In 1886 he settled in Stresa on Lake Maggiore, where he painted impressionistic views of the region, becoming the chief representative of the landscape school emerging there in the 1890s. He still visited Liguria regularly in winter and occasionally went to work in Venice. Later works include the landscape Monte Rosa at Macugnaga (1896; Rome, Galleria Nazionale d'Arte Moderna). Gignous died in 1906 in Stresa. The Venice Biennale held a retrospective exhibition of his work in 1907.

== Selected works ==
- Veduta del Monte Rosa, Galleria d'Arte Moderna, Rome
- Primavera, Galleria d'Arte Moderna, Milan
- Sul Mottarone, Galleria d'Arte Moderna, Milan
- Lago Maggiore, Feriolo, Gallerie di Palazzo Leoni Montanari, Vicenza
- Paesaggio con treno, Gallerie di Palazzo Leoni Montanari, Vicenza
- Pecetto Macugnaga, Gallerie di Palazzo Leoni Montanari, Vicenza
- Prima neve, Galleria d'Arte Moderna Ricci Oddi, Piacenza
- Bosco, Galleria d'Arte Moderna Ricci Oddi, Piacenza
- Pianura Lombarda, Museo del Paesaggio, Verbania Pallanza
- Fletschhorn, Museo del Paesaggio, Verbania Pallanza
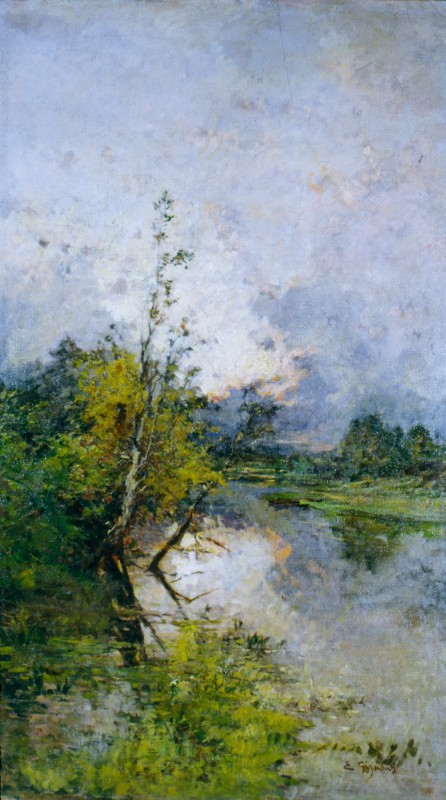
Paesaggio con stagno

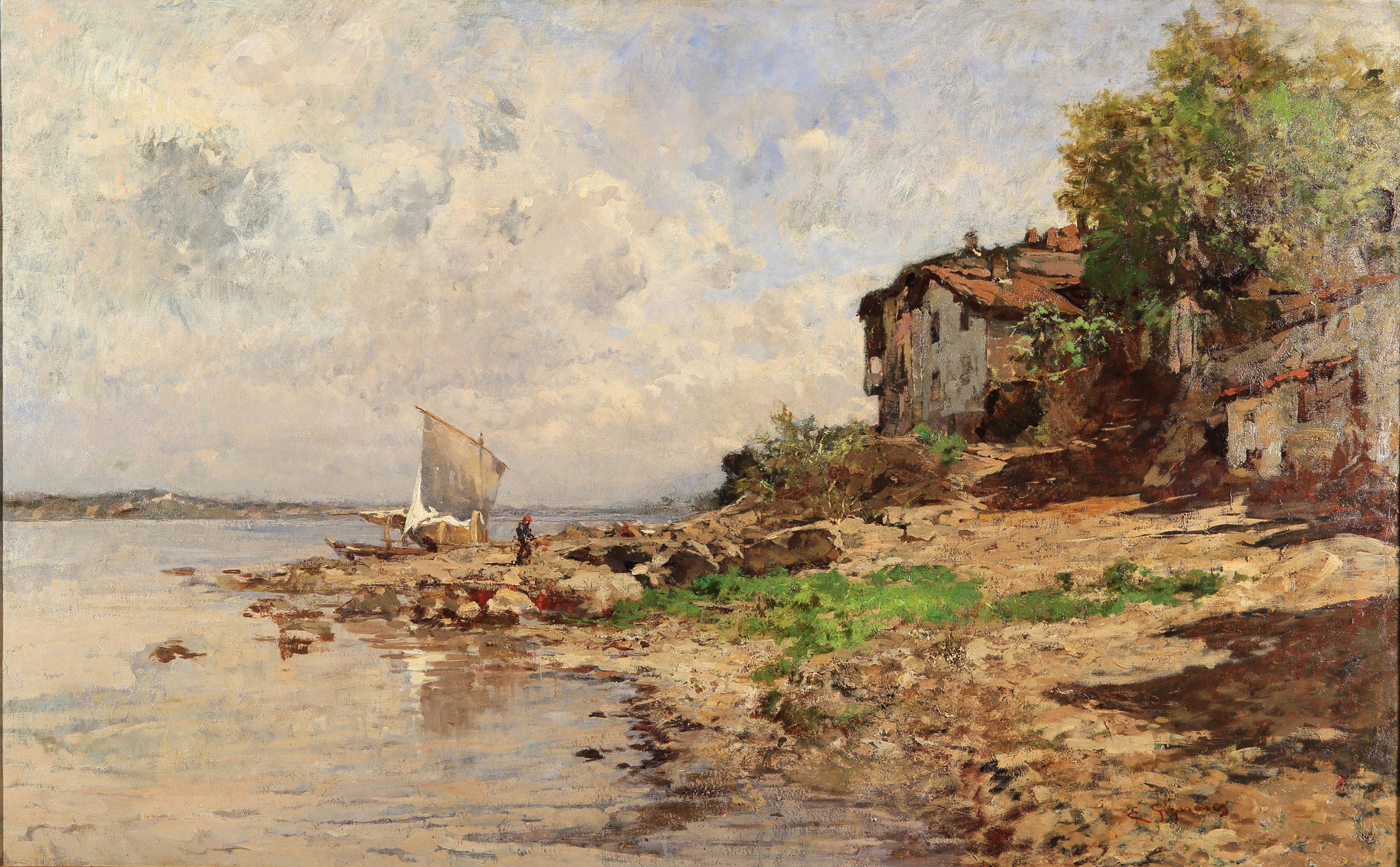
Landscape on Lake Maggiore

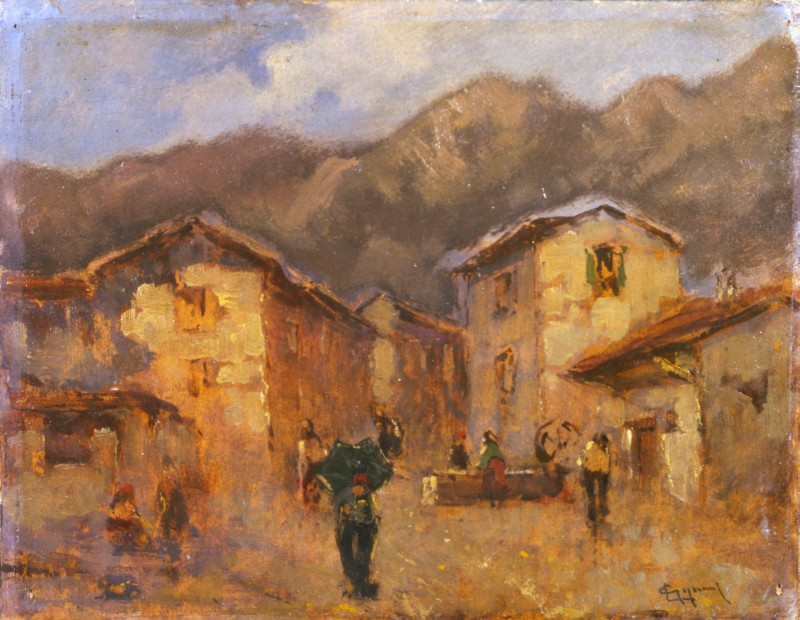
Case e montagne

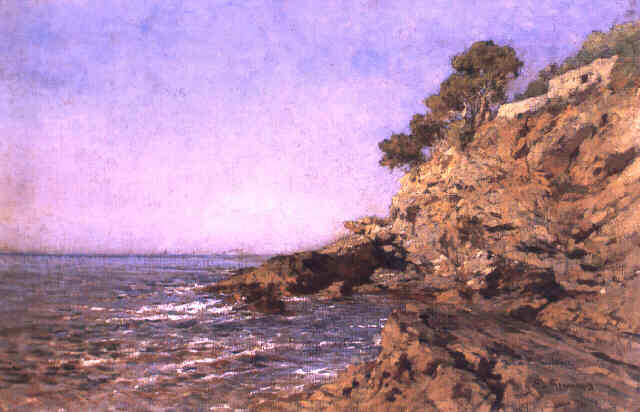
Scogliera a Sestri Levante

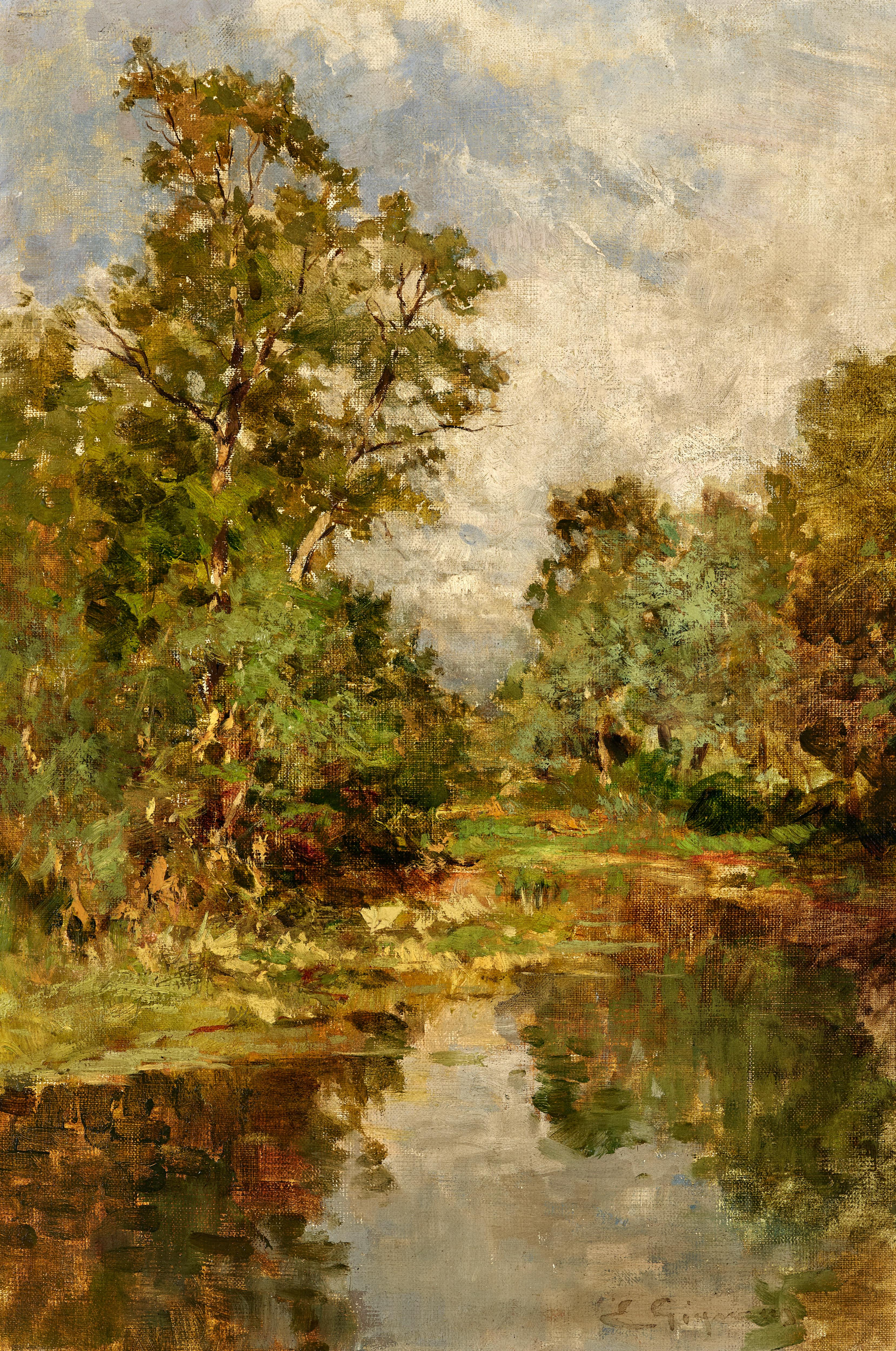
Bosco con stagno

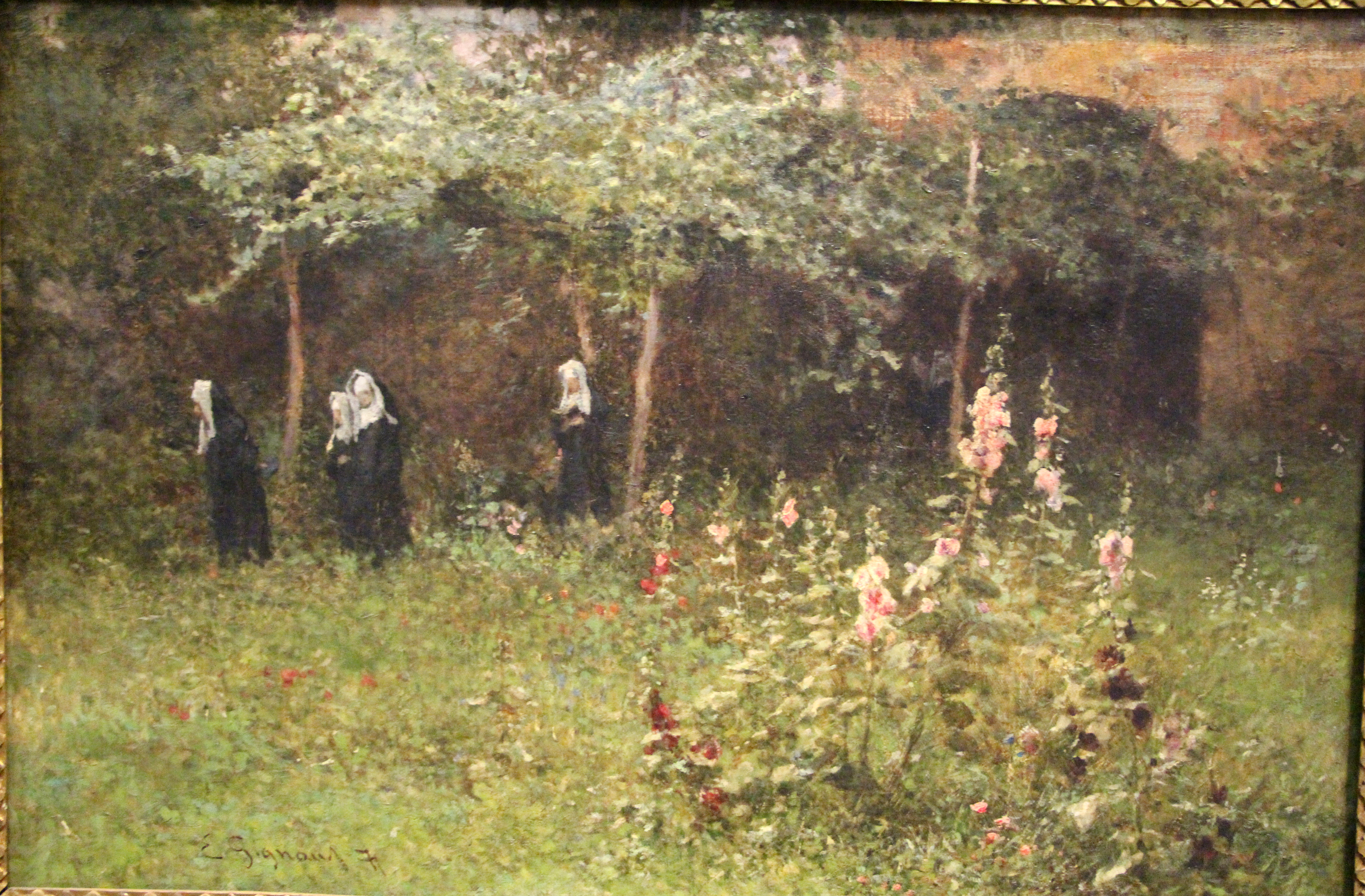
I fiori del chiostro

== Other projects ==
Media related to Eugenio Gignous at Wikimedia Commons

- Avanzi, Beatrice (2000). "GIGNOUS, Eugenio". Dizionario Biografico degli Italiani (in Italian). Vol. 54: Ghiselli–Gimma. Rome: Istituto dell'Enciclopedia Italiana. ISBN 978-88-12-00032-6.
