= Bartolomeo Giuliano =

Italian painter (1825–1909)

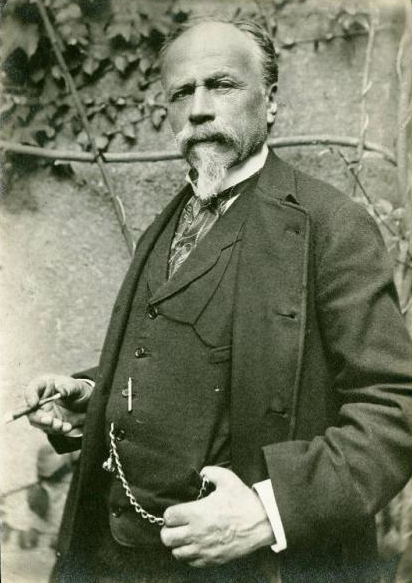
- Born: 15 August 1825; Susa, Kingdom of Sardinia
- Died: 12 April 1909 (aged 83); Milan, Kingdom of Italy
- Occupation: painter

Bartolomeo Giuliano (15 August 1825 – 12 April 1909) was an Italian painter; primarily of portraits and genre scenes.

== Biography ==
His father was a wealthy doctor and he had a comfortable childhood. In 1832, when he was seven, his family moved to Turin. After completing his basic education, he attended the Accademia Albertina, where he studied drawing with Giovanni Battista Biscarra and painting with Carlo Arienti. Upon graduating, in 1845, he worked in the studios of his friend and colleague, Giovanni Battista Arnaud. The following year, he began presenting his works at the "Society for Promotion of the Fine Arts".

In 1857, after several years of traveling between Sardinia and Tuscany, he was called to the Accademia in Turin, where he became an assistant professor of figure drawing to Enrico Gamba. After 1860, he held the same position at the Scuola Militare Teulié in Milan, then at the Accademia di Belle Arti di Brera, where he assisted Raffaele Casnedi. During this time, he married Federica Gervasoni (1838-1915), an artist from Genoa.

He took part in the Esposizione Nazionale Italiana in Florence (1861), and was a regular participant at exhibitions in Turin and Milan, with works on religious subjects, landscapes and genre scenes. He was heavily influenced by the Scapigliatura movement and the works of the French artist, Jules Breton. In 1866, he created allegorical frescoes in the lunettes of the dome at the Galleria Vittorio Emanuele II in Milan. These were later replaced with mosaics.

After he gave up teaching, he lived in the Quarto dei Mille on the Ligurian Riviera. He displayed scenes from that area, in Paris, at the Exposition Universelle of 1878. Two of his largest exhibitions were at the Esposizione Internazionale d’Arte in Venice (1895 and 1897). He also took part in the Esposizione Nazionale held in Milan in 1906.

He died in Milan, aged eighty-three. Bronze sculptures of him, by Giulio Branca, may be seen at the Accademia Brera and in the Cimitero Monumentale.

== Selected paintings ==
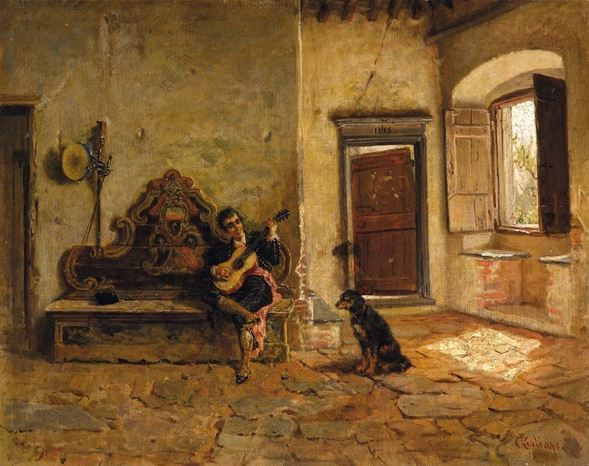
Man with a Guitar and a Dog

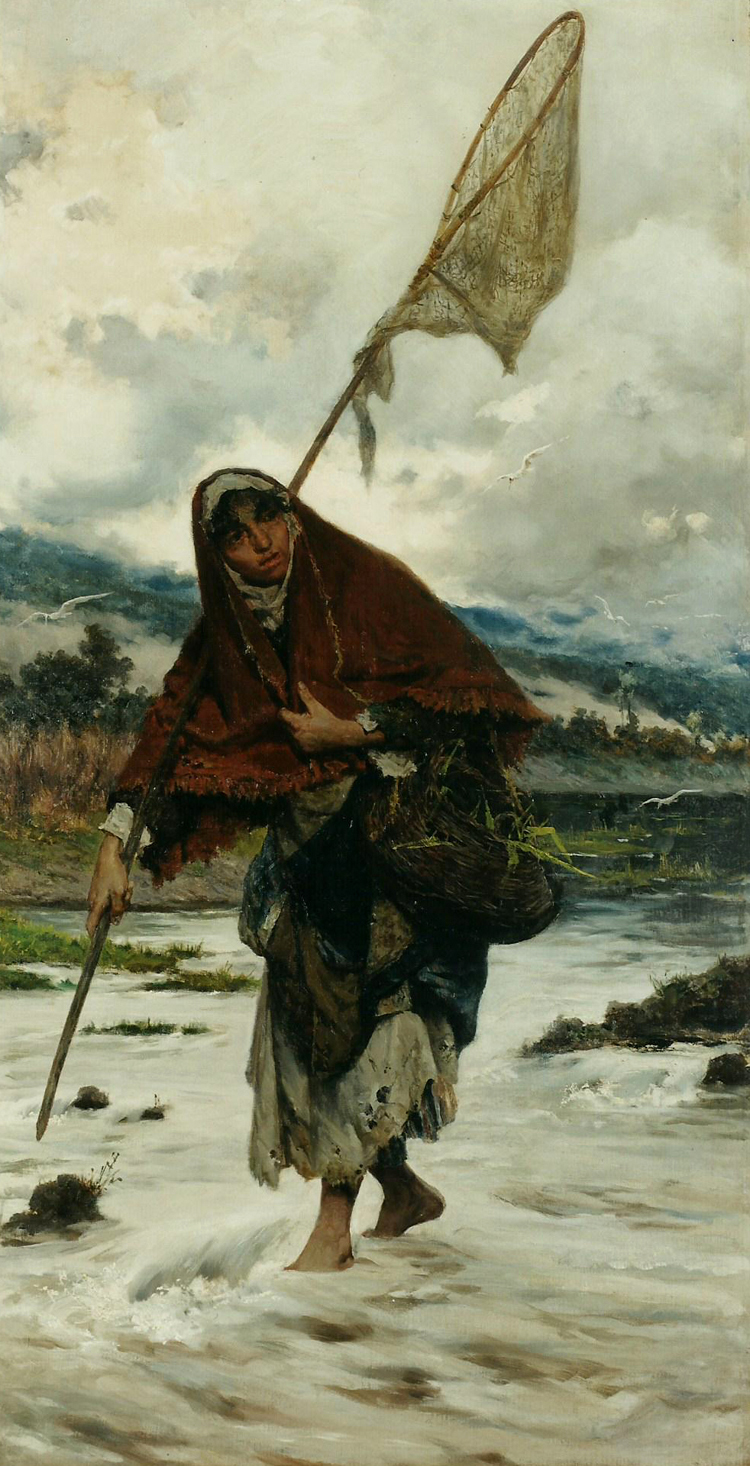
Fisherwoman at the River

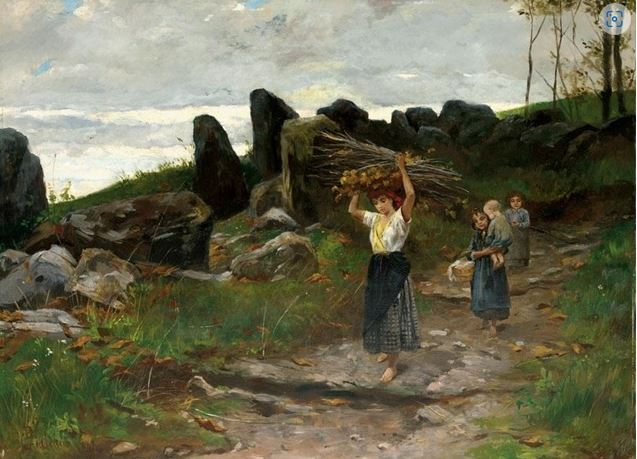
The Return Home

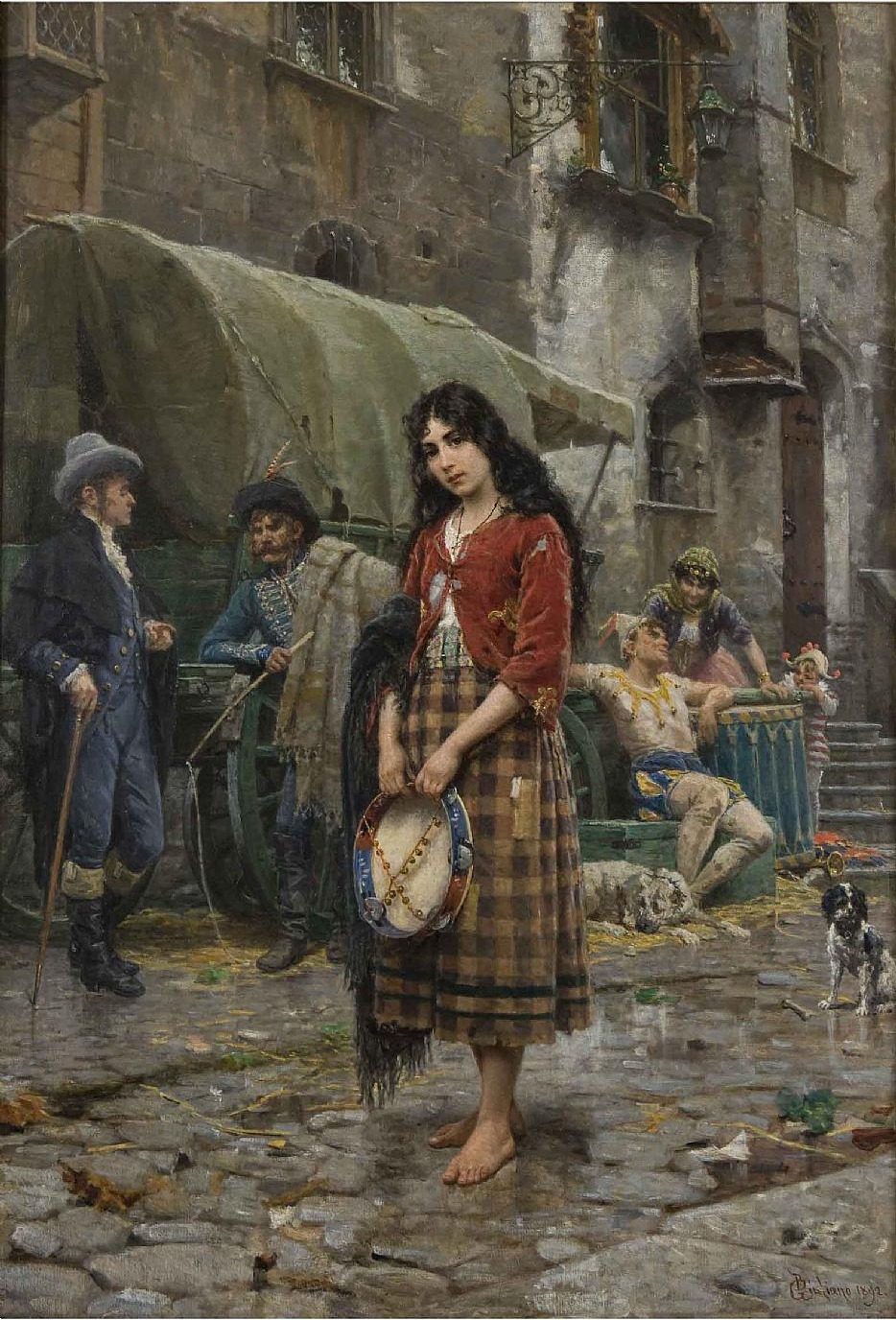
The Mignon

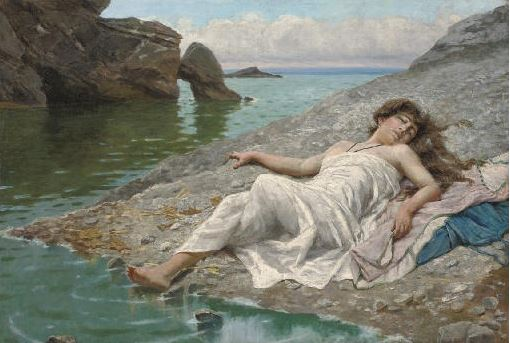
Temptation
