= Lorenzo Delleani =

Italian painter (1840–1908)

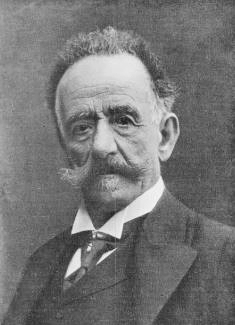
Lorenzo Delleani

Lorenzo Delleani (17 January 1840 – 13 November 1908) was an Italian painter, known primarily for landscapes and genre scenes.

== Biography ==
Birth in Pollone, he was the third son of Agostino Delleani, a member of the Royal Corps of Civil Engineering, and his wife, Maddalena née Billotti. Encouraged by an uncle who noticed his artistic talent, he enrolled at the Accademia Albertina in Turin. His primary instructors there were Enrico Gamba and Carlo Arienti. Initially, he worked in the field of history painting, which brought him some official recognition. In 1874, he exhibited at the Salon in Paris. He had a showing there again in 1878, featuring his work "Regattas in Venice".

From the beginning of the 1880s, he gradually abandoned academic Romanticism, modernizing his means of expression and range of subjects with a new focus on landscapes and painting from life. In 1883, he went to the Netherlands, to study the paintings of the Dutch Golden Age, which inspired him to brighten his color palette.

Later, he focused exclusively on painting en plein aire, capturing light in thick strokes of color. His favorite subjects were views of the Piedmontese and Lombard countrysides, in changing conditions of light and season. He also painted some genre scenes, depicting devotional pilgrimages to mountain shrines, such as "Pilgrimage to Oropa", now on display in Asti.

In 1899, he participated in the III Esposizione internazionale d'arte in Venice, accompanied by his pupil and patron, Countess Sofia Cacherano di Bricherasio. In 1905, he presented forty works at the Venice Biennale and, later that same year, participated in the Ninth International Art Exhibition in Munich. These events helped to secure his international reputation.

His best known students included Giuseppe Bozzalla and Giuseppe Buscaglione. He also gave some lessons to his younger brother, Celestino Delleani (1850-1873), who died of tuberculosis at a spa in Nervi.

The city of Turin has named a street after him in the Pozzo Strada district. There are also streets bearing his name in Biella, Chieri, and Santena.

== Selected paintings ==
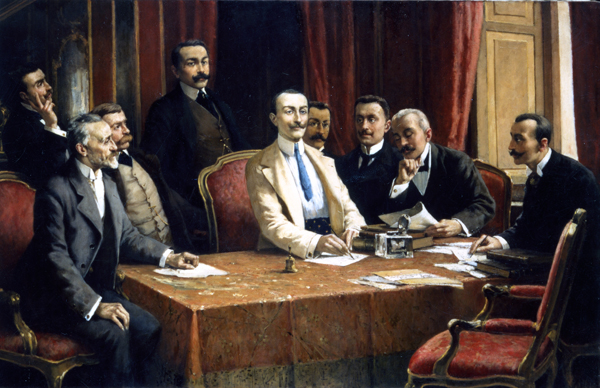
The Founders of Fiat

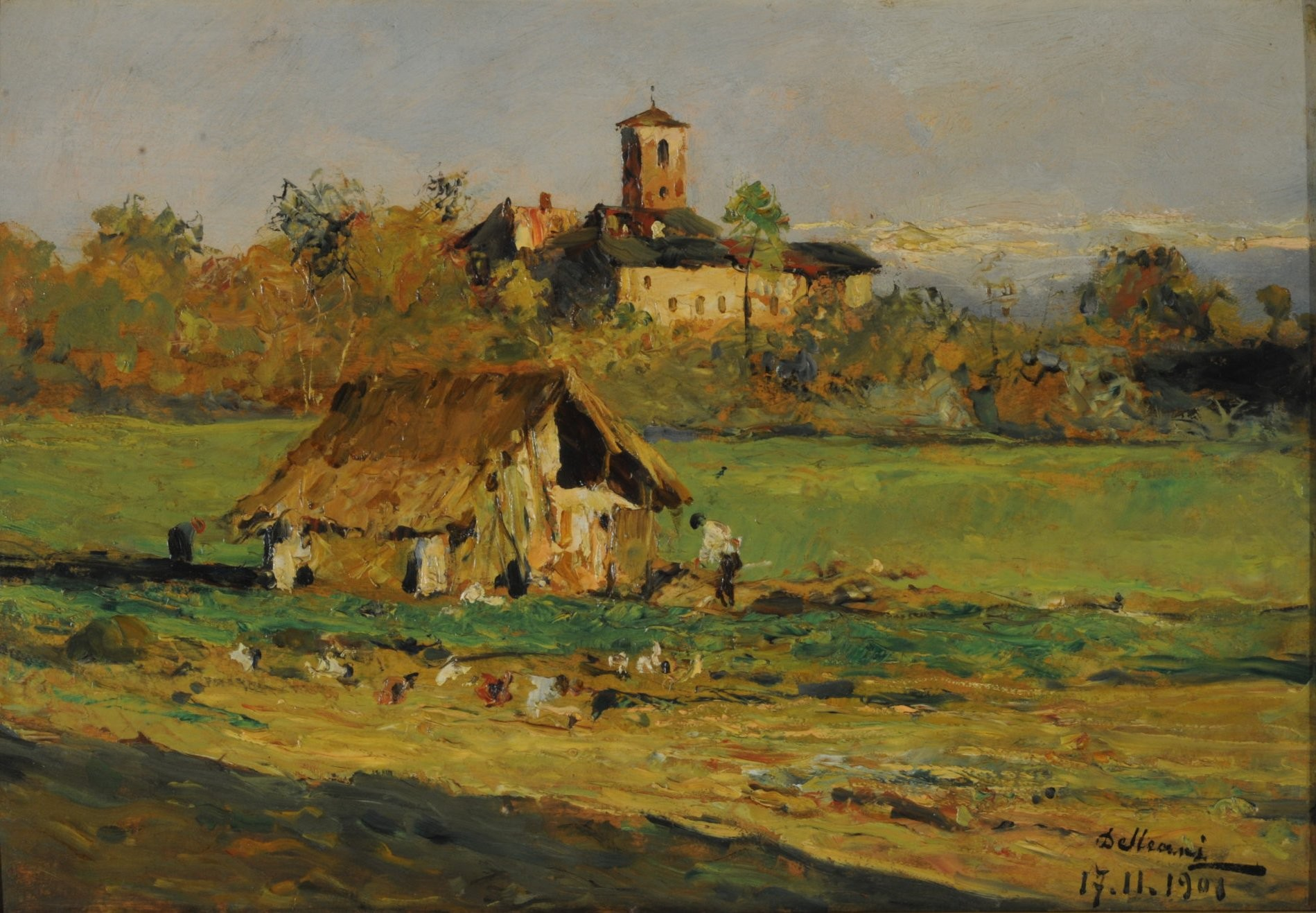
On the Outskirts of Turin

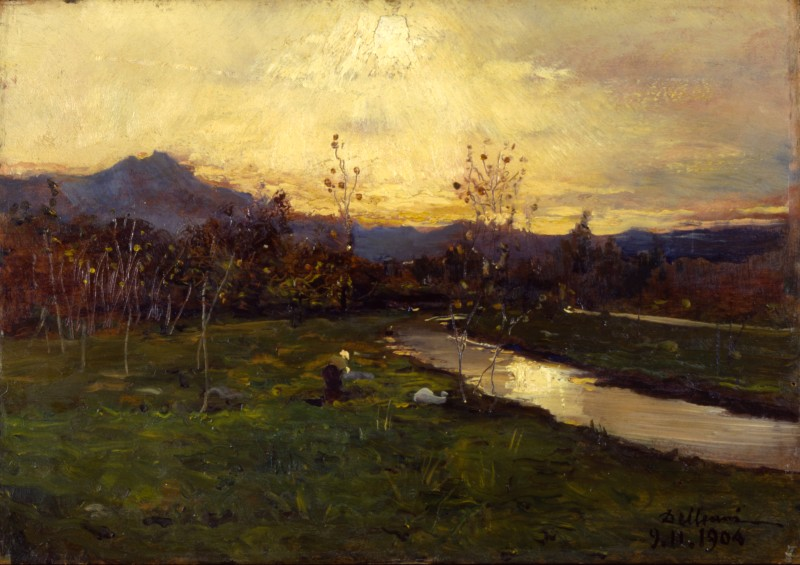
Golden Autumn, or Sunset in November

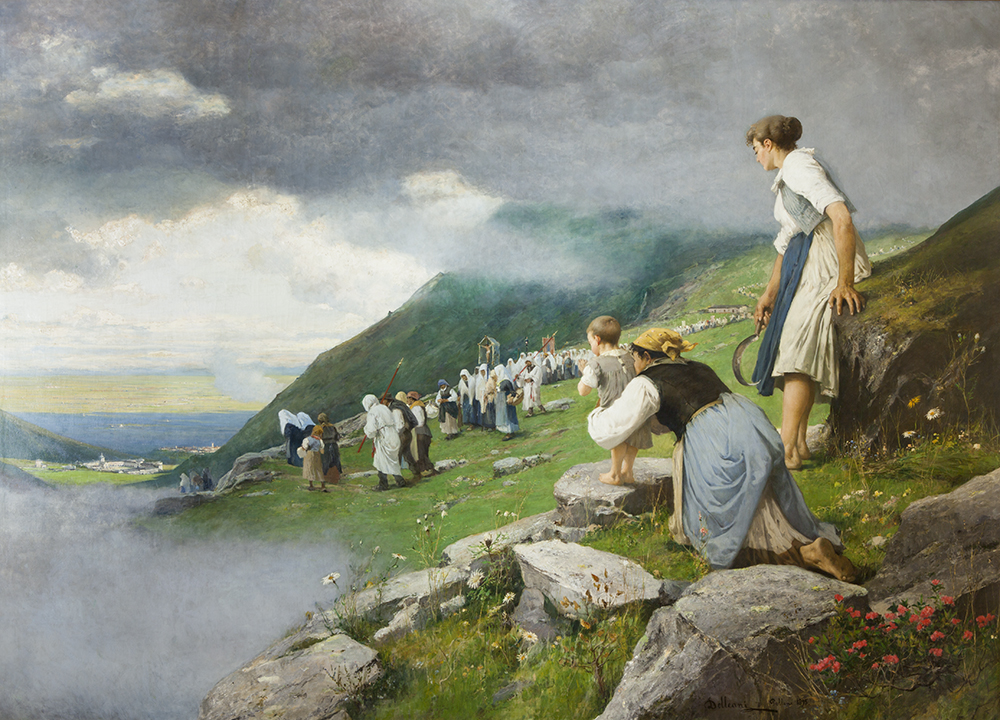
Pilgrimage to Oropa
