= Andrea Gastaldi =

Italian painter

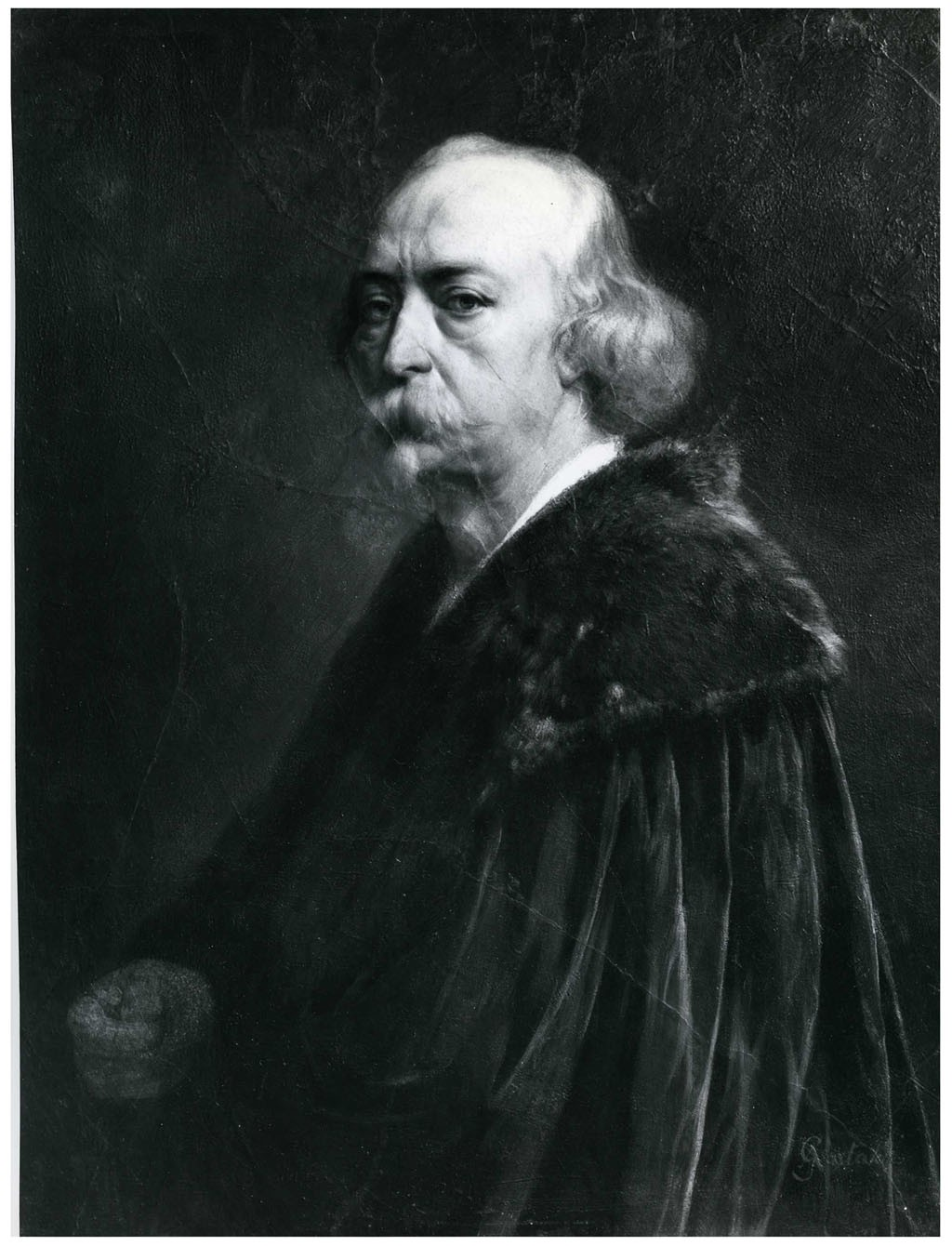
- Self-portrait
- Born: Andrea Gastaldi; 18 April 1826; Turin, Italy
- Died: 9 January 1889 (aged 62); Turin, Italy
- Known for: Painter
- Notable work: "Il sogno di Parisina" (1852), "Pietro Micca" (1858), "Gerolamo Savonarola in prigione" (1856)
- Movement: Romanticism
- Awards: Premio di Breme (1860)
- Patrons: Michele Cusa, Giovan Battista Biscarra, Carlo Arienti

Andrea Gastaldi (April 18, 1826 – January 9, 1889) was an Italian painter, primarily of historical canvases and portraits.

== Biography ==
Gastaldi was born and died in Turin, Piedmont. He studied at the Accademia Albertina under Michele Cusa, Giovan Battista Biscarra, and Carlo Arienti. He then traveled to Florence and Rome during 1850–1851 and 1853–1859; and spent some time in Paris studying in the studio of the history painter Thomas Couture. He met also Paul Delaroche.

In 1860 at the Promotrice of Turin, with the painting of Pietro Micca, he won the institute award funded by the Marchese Di Breme, and was nominated to be professor of painting at the Albertina.

Among his other works depicting historical or literary subjects is The Prisoner of Chillon (1854, Promotrice at Turin). This work is based on a poem by Lord Byron and was made into an acquaforte engraving by Alberto Maso Gilli in 1864 in an Album of the Promotrice.

Other works include: Gerolamo Savonarola in jail (1856); L'Innominato (1860); and Atala (1862). The latter is the half-Christian and half-Seminole maiden at the center of a Romantic style novel by the French author Chateaubriand, and which culminates in her chaste suicide. A number of other painters including Girodet, Luis Monroy, and Rodolfo Amoedo also depicted this subject.

Gastaldi made two versions of the painting Sogno di Parisina (including the 1852 version at the Pennsylvania Academy of the Fine Arts in Philadelphia, and a second 1867 version in Turin). The tragic story of Parisina was popularized by writers including Matteo Bandello, Lope de Vega, and in 1816, Lord Byron. In the last version, the Duke of Ferrara ascertains his wife's infidelity, when she mentions her lover's name during sleep. The enraged Duke contracts the murder of the lover, who happens to be his bastard son; he has the assassins do so in front of the Duke's wife. Bartolomeo Giuliano also painted the same subject in 1861 and 1863 (Galleria d’Arte Moderna, Turin).

Gastaldi's wife, Léonie Lescuyer-Gastaldi, was also a painter, who had trained with Rosa Bonheur. Gastaldi's brother Lorenzo was the archbishop of Turin from 1871 to 1883. Among Gastaldi's pupils were Giovan Battista Carpanetto, Giacomo Gandi, Michelangelo Merano, and Giacomo Grosso.

== Gallery ==
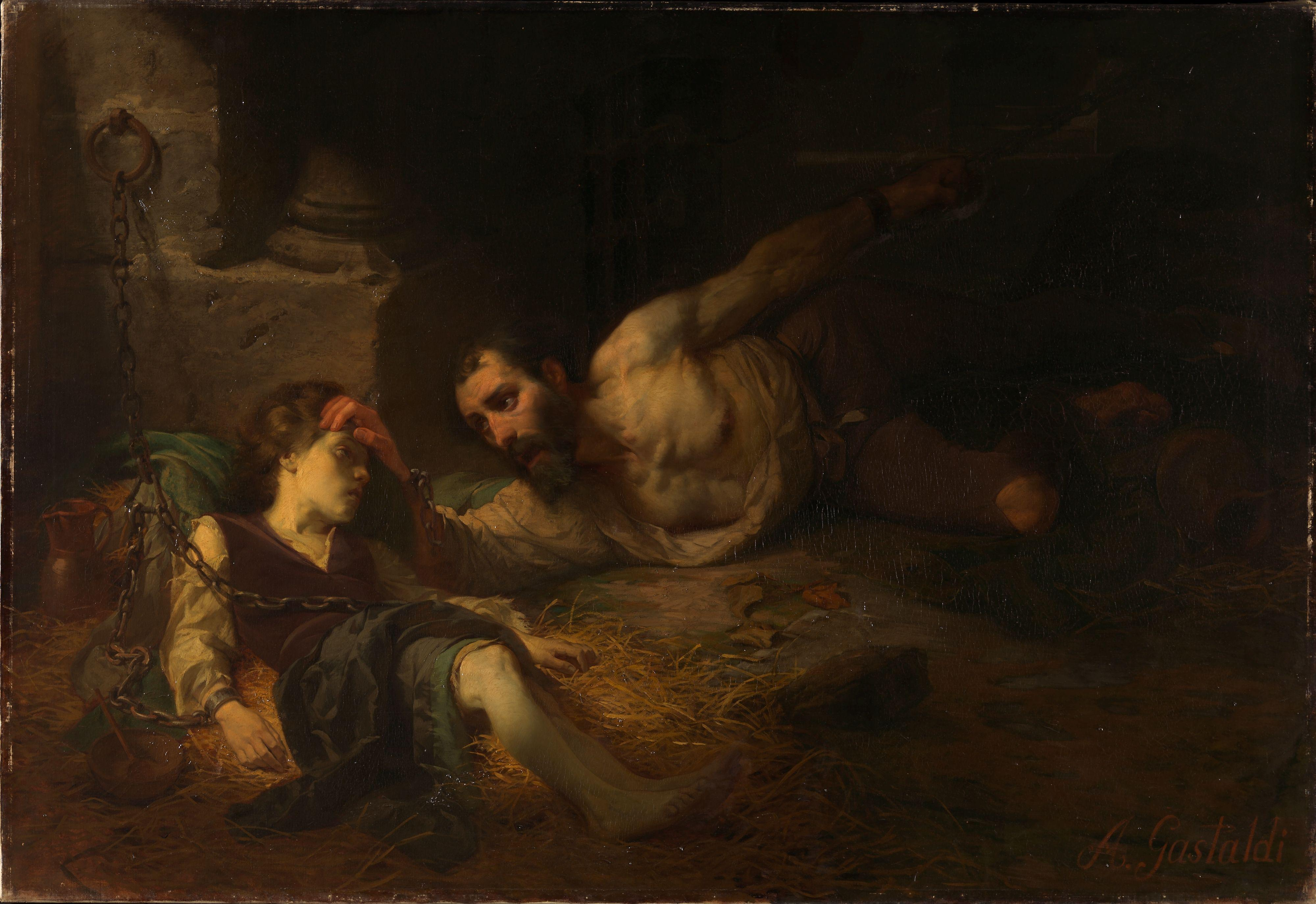
The Prisoner of Chillon

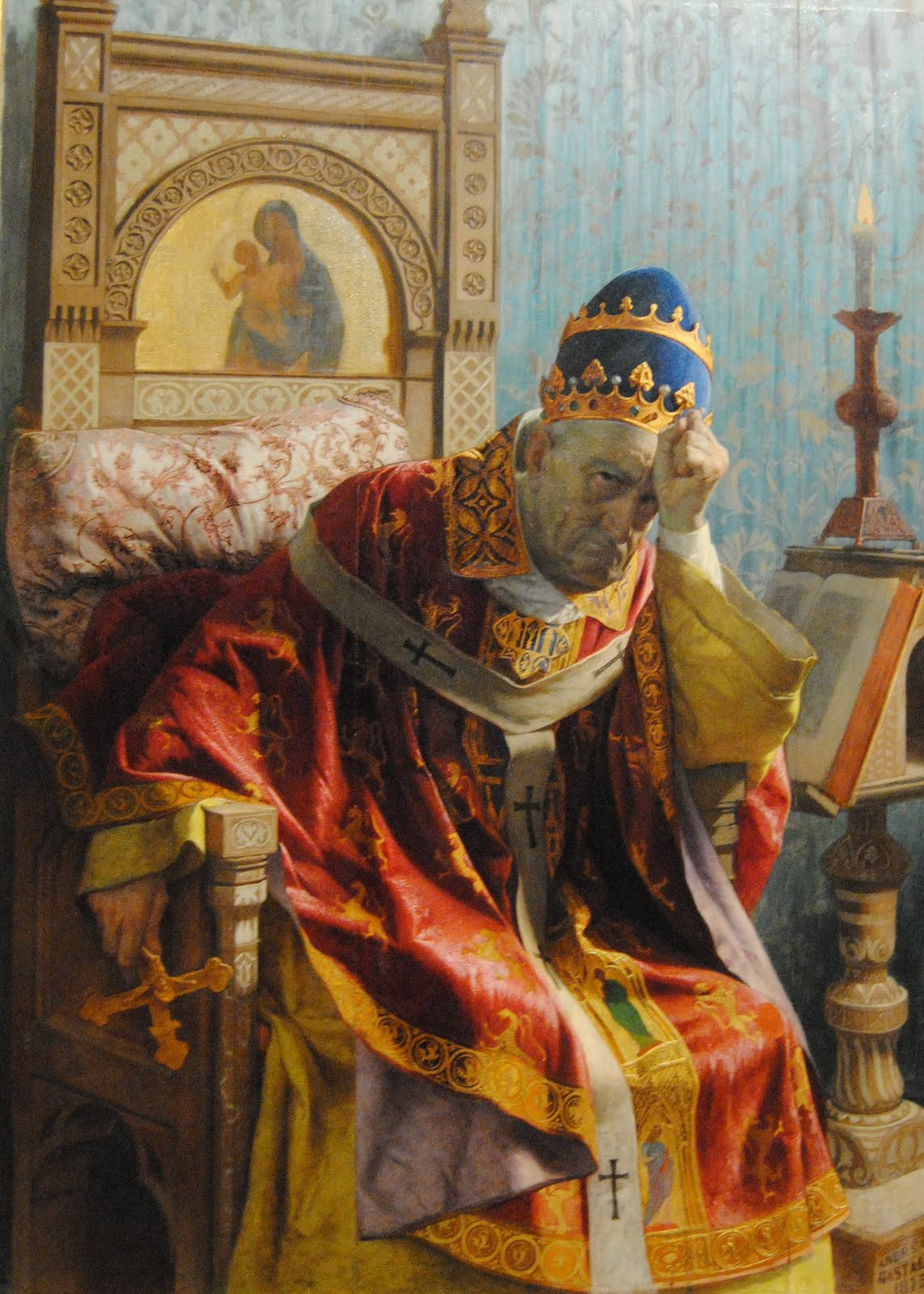
Pope Boniface VIII

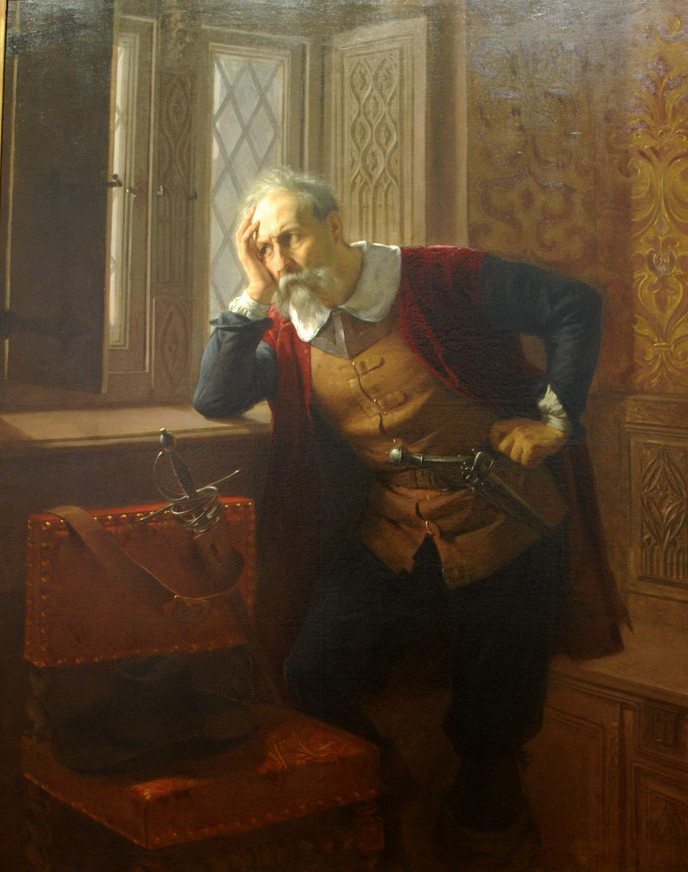
The Unnamed

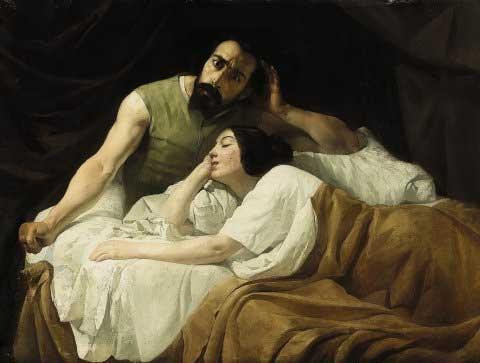
Parisina

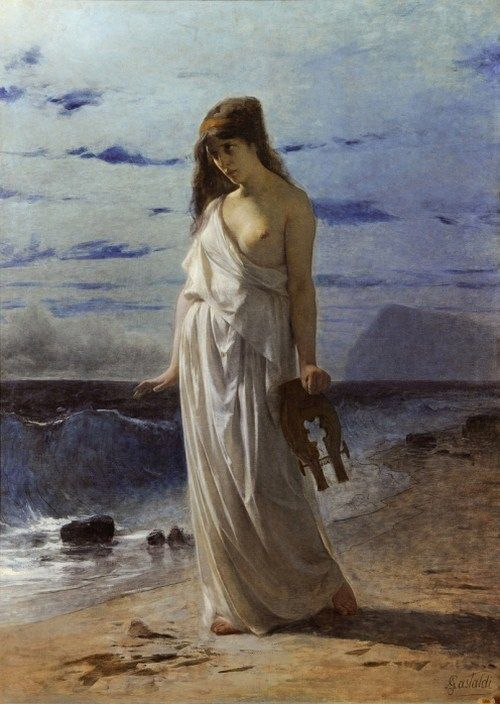
Sappho

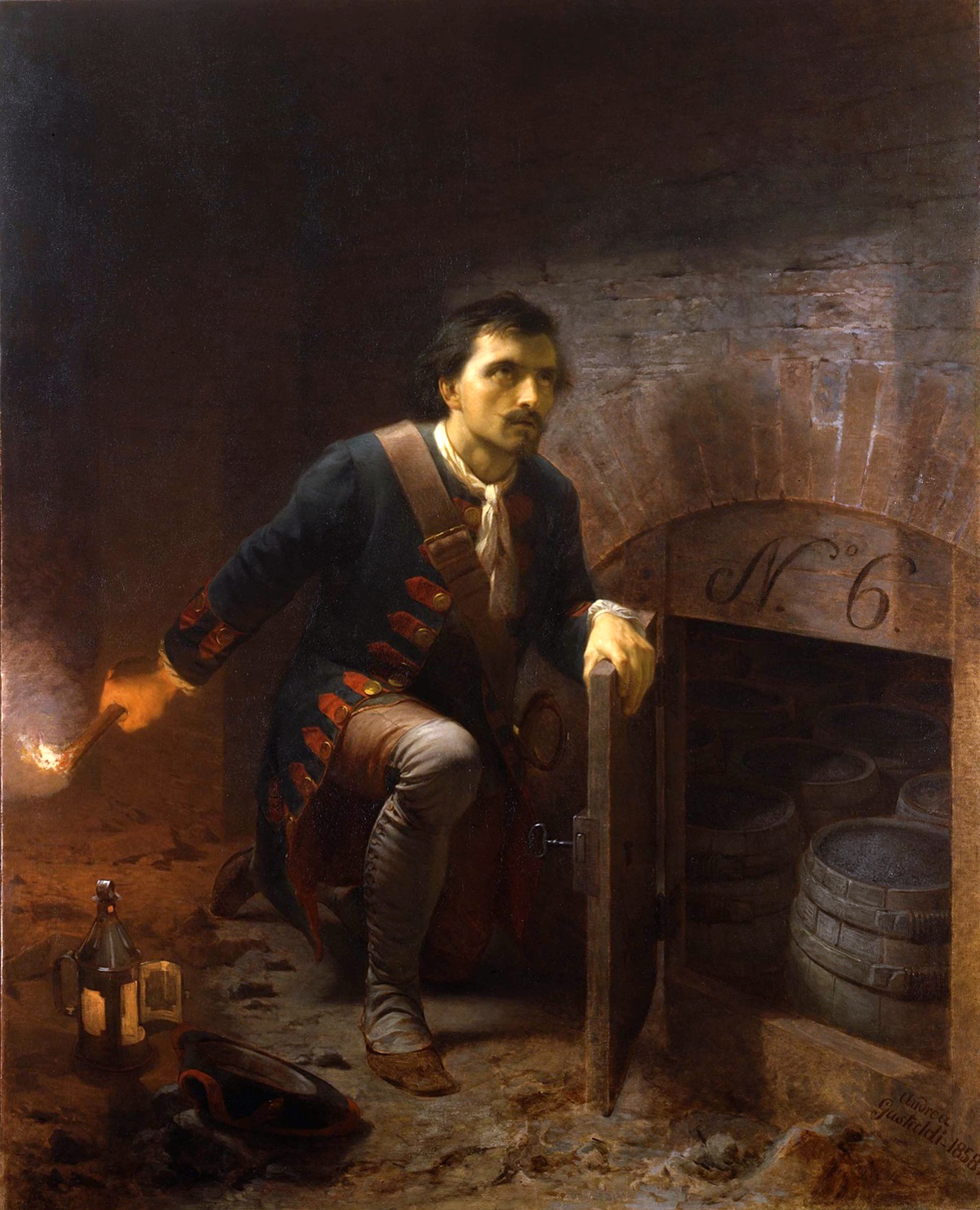
Pietro Micca lights the gunpowder (1858, Museo del Risorgimento, Turin)
