= Giovanni Battista Arnaud =

Italian painter

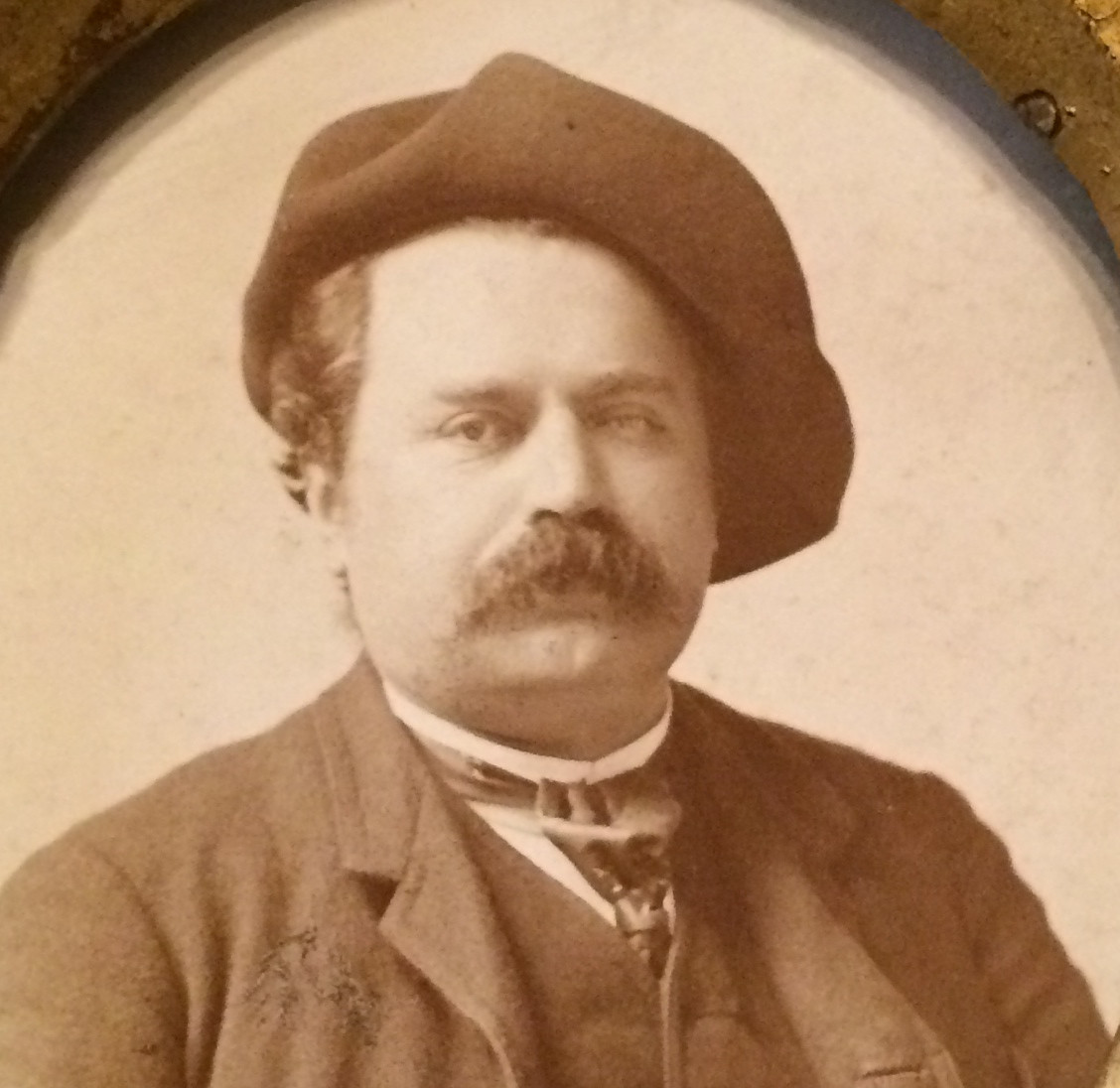
Giovanni Battista Arnaud Senior

Giovanni Battista Arnaud (1853–1910) was an Italian painter of frescoes. He mastered as well, the chiaroscuro technique. His work can be found in many churches, palaces and public buildings in different regions of the north of Italy, as well in some churches of France and England. He was also a portraitist.

== Biography ==
Giovanni Battista Arnaud was born on 12 January 1853 in Valgrana, Cuneo province, Italy.

At the Accademia Albertina de Torino he studied with the great teachers Andrea Gastaldi and Enrico Gamba. Most of his work as painter and "frescante" takes place in Italy, France and England, where his artistry was well appreciated throughout his extensive and varied artistic production.

In Italy he participated in the Cuneo Art Exhibition of 1898.

He carried out various works of fresco painting in several Piedmont churches, such as the Maria Vergine Parish Church in Roccavione, the Church of San Giovanni Battista in Caraglio, the Sanctuary of San Mauro in Busca, the Santuario della Madonna della Divina Provvidenza in Peveragno, the Parish Church of San Martino in Valdieri, the Santuario di Sant'Anna in Vinadio, the Sanctuary of Bealetto in Entracque, where he was commissioned, in 1888, the canvas of "Madonna della Neve", and the Stations of the Cross (1891) in a neogotic style at San Pietro in Vincoli Parish in Limone Piemonte.

In Paesana, his frescoes cover the interior of the church Confraternita di Santa Croce. In this same town, for the Santa Margherita Church, Arnaud painted his Annunciazione, a delicate canvas made in 1901. Here is to be found his "Matrimonio di Maria" as well. Most of these works display Arnaud's skill in the realization of chiaroscuro pieces.

At the end of 1800 he carried out restoration work and painting of new frescoes at the Palazzo Marchetti in Caraglio, the town where he lived most of his life. The work was commissioned by the "Garin di Cocconato" family, originally from Nice and owners of the palace at the time.

Regarding his work as a portraitist, notable are his paintings in the Council Room of Caraglio Municipality, where the portrait of King Umberto (Re Umberto) can be seen. Also the portrait made of Count Garin di Cocconato, and the portrait of the Engineer Sebastian Grandis, famous for having designed and directed in 1870, the works for the construction of the Frejus railway tunnel of more than 12 km between France and Italy, the first great tunnel in a mountain.

In France, he left his mark as a fresco painter in the Church of Selonnet, in the Alpes-de-Haute-Provence region.

In England, between 1885 and 1886, he carried out fresco and chiaroscuro works in London, at the St Peter's Italian Church. He also had the responsibility of supervising all artistic work on that project. The realization of frescoes is shared with the artist Francesco Gauthier, also from Piedmont, Italy.

His oil paintings on canvas can be found at various churches in northern Italy. Part of this work is listed by the Diocese of Cuneo, as religious artistic assets. Among these works stand out:

- Maddona della Neve (1888)

- Natività di Maria (1897)

- Presentazione al Tempio di Maria (1892)

- Sant'Anna insegna a leggere a Maria (1893)

- San Giuseppe da Leonessa (1904)

- Madonna col Bambino e santi (1905)

Giovanni Battista Arnaud died in Caraglio on 9 January 1910. His remains rest in the family pantheon in the cemetery of Caraglio. The pantheon is covered with frescoes painted by his nephew, Giovanni Arnaud "junior".

== Frescoes and chiaroscuros ==
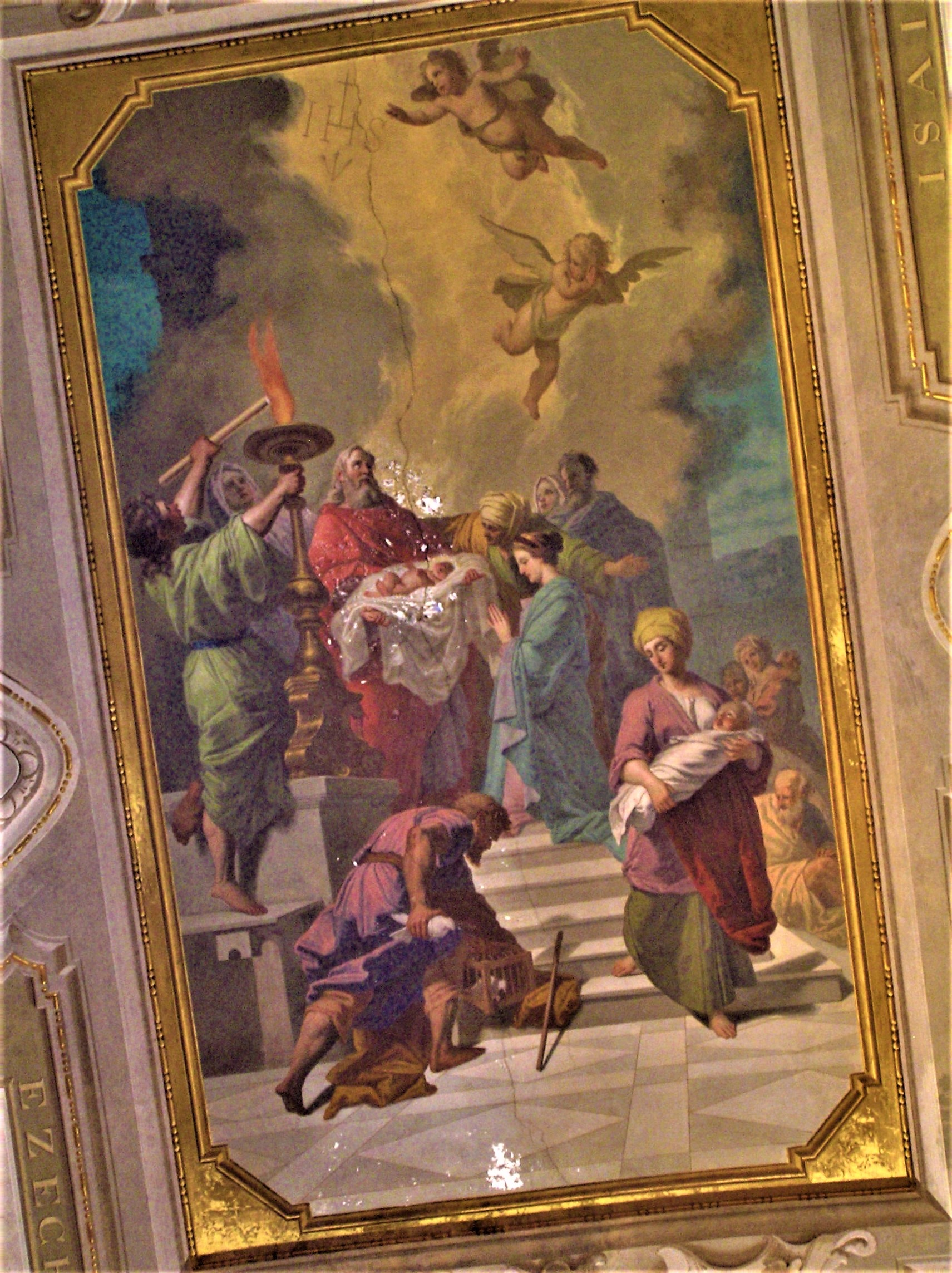
Church of San Giovanni Battista in Caraglio

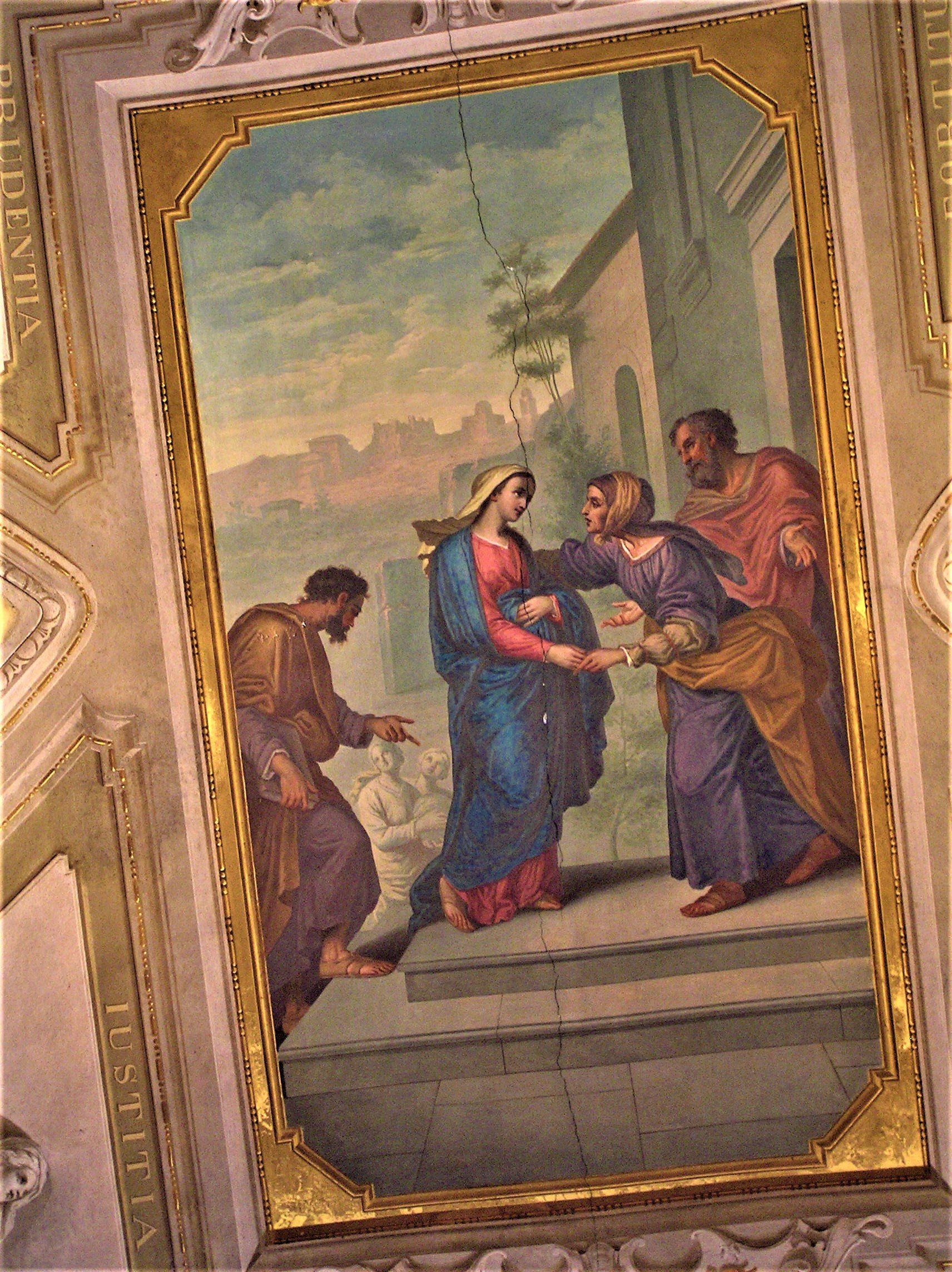
Church of San Giovanni Battista in Caraglio

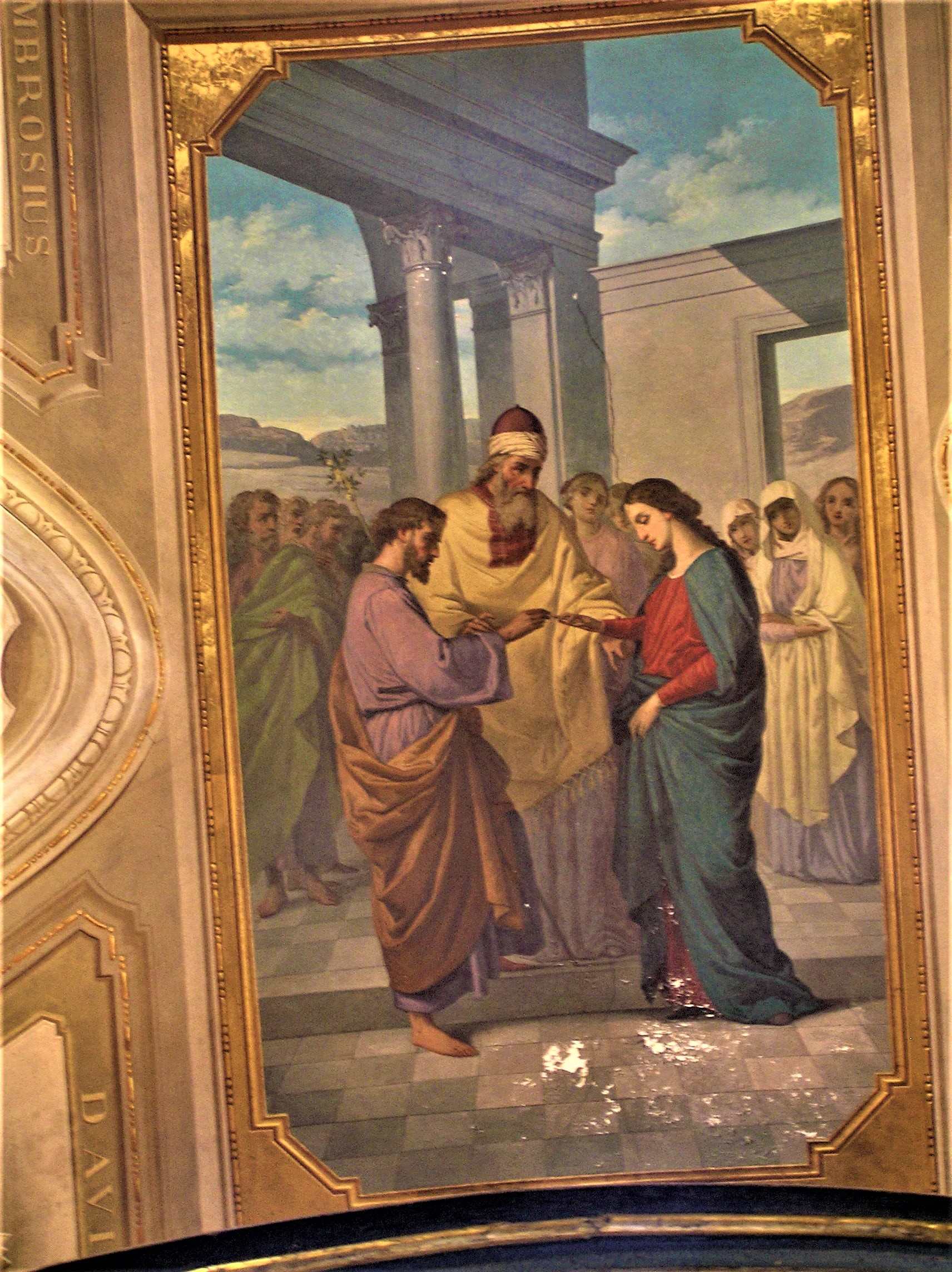
Church of San Giovanni Battista in Caraglio

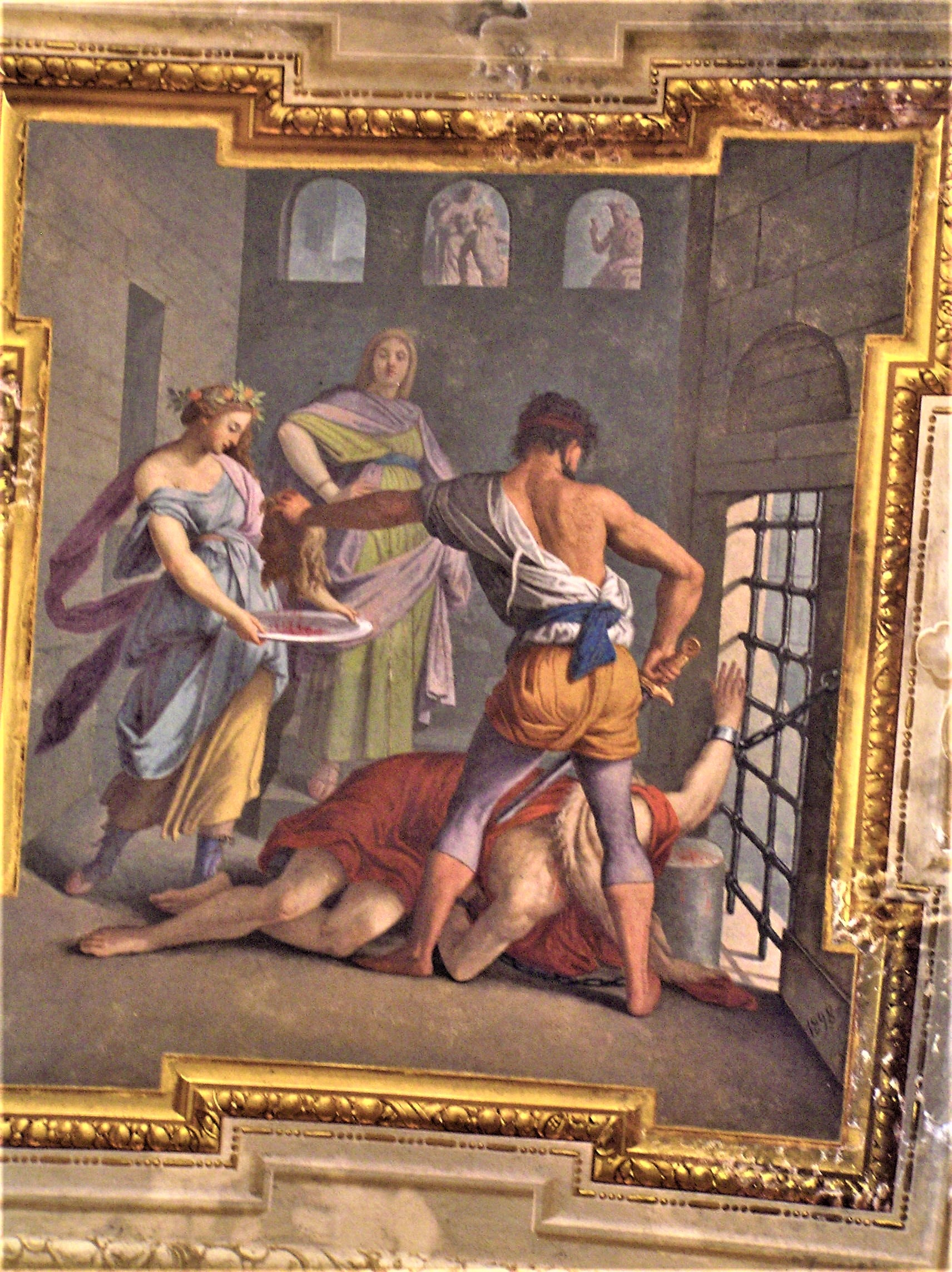
Church of San Giovanni Battista in Caraglio

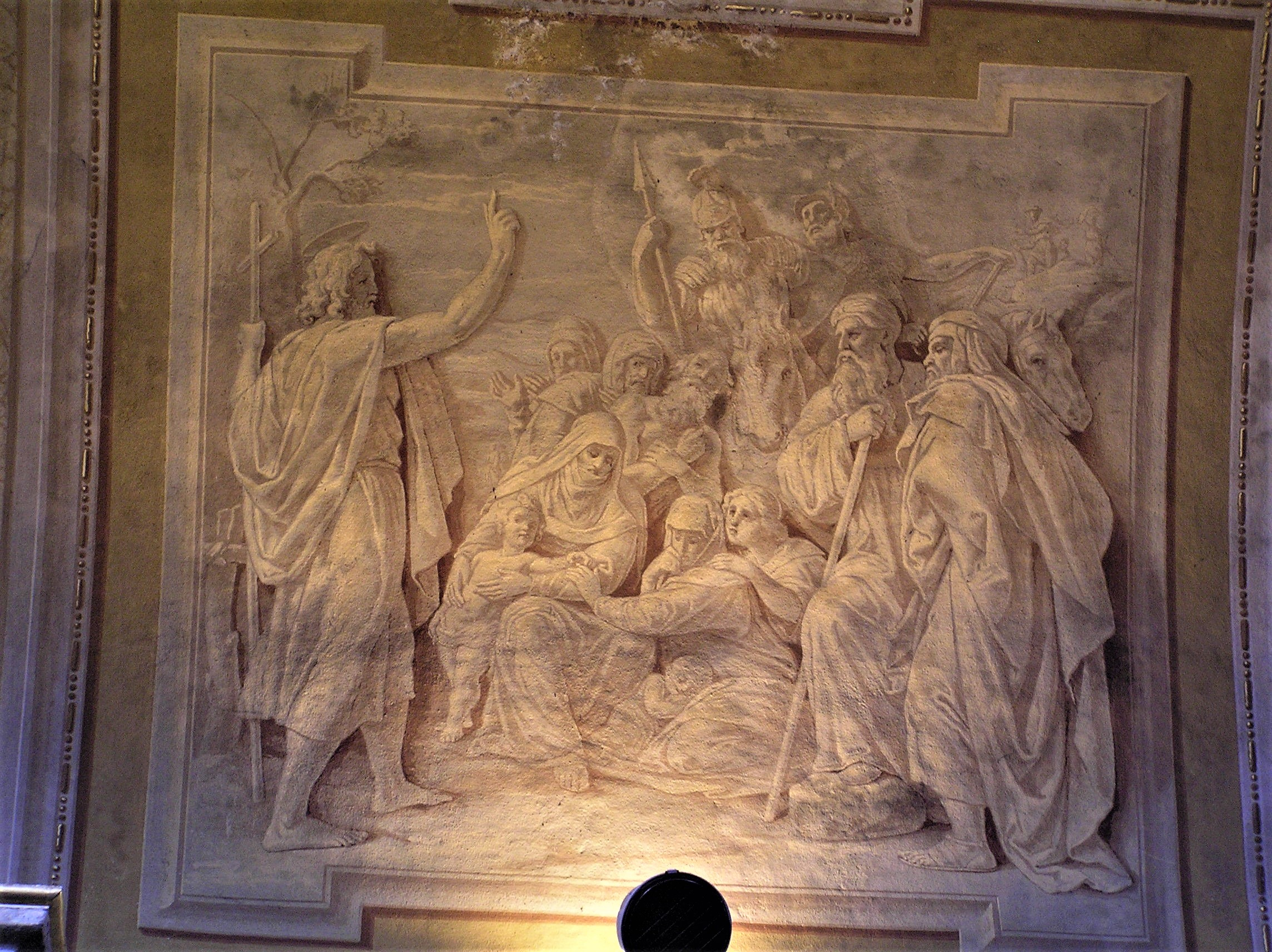
Chiaroscuro Church of San Giovanni Battista di Caraglio

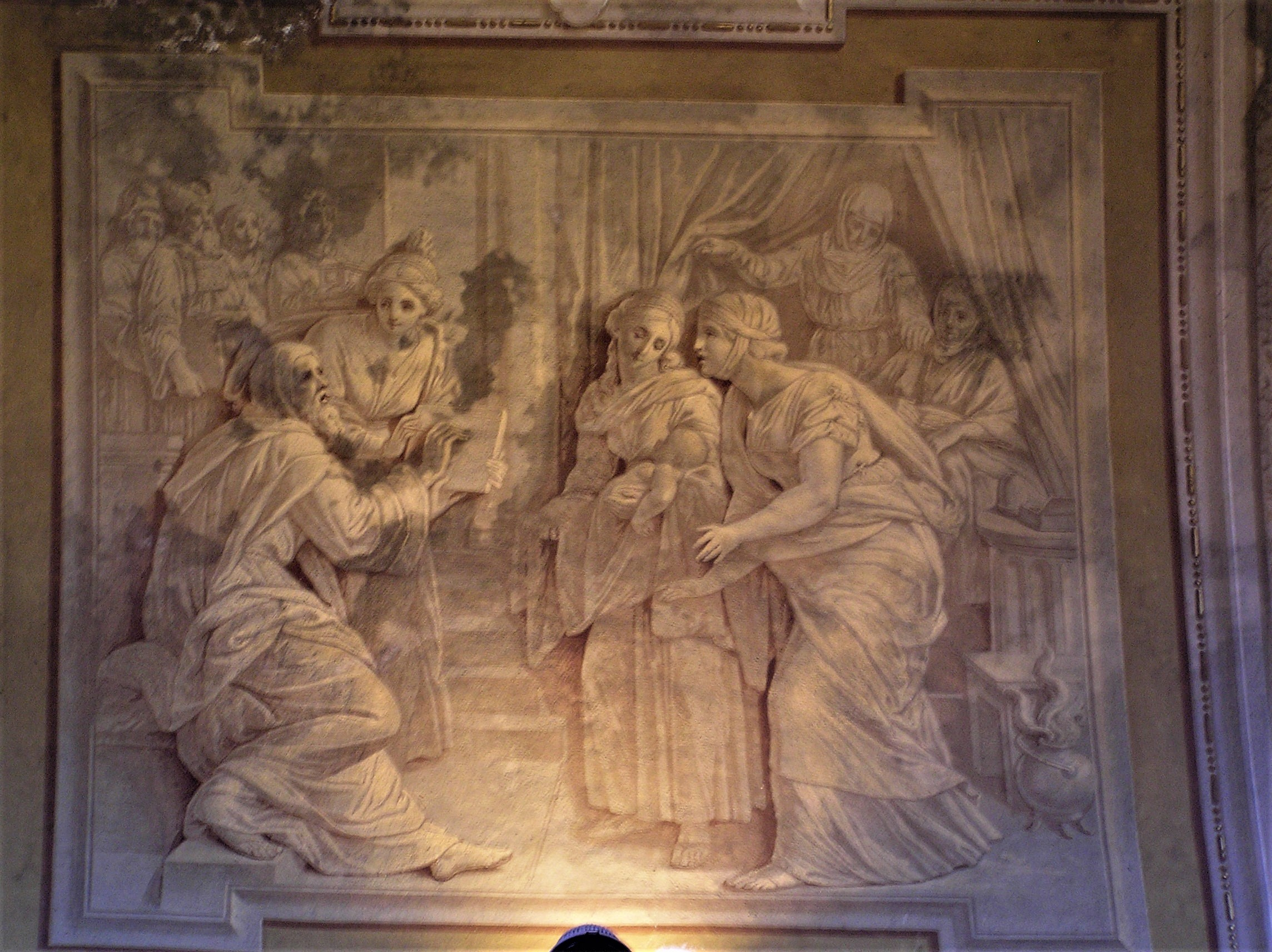
Chiaroscuro Church of San Giovanni Battista di Caraglio

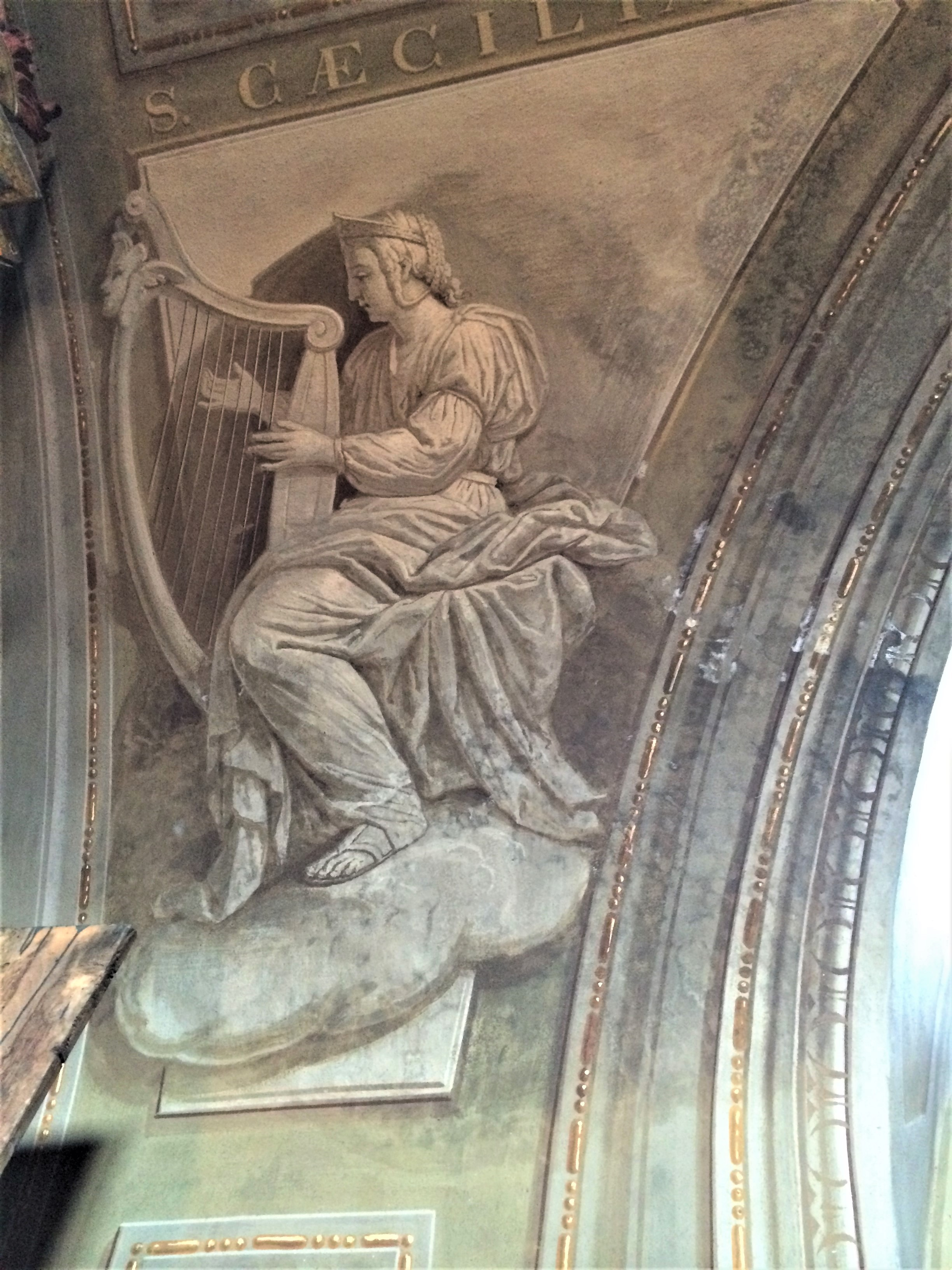
Chiaroscuro Church of San Giovanni Battista di Caraglio

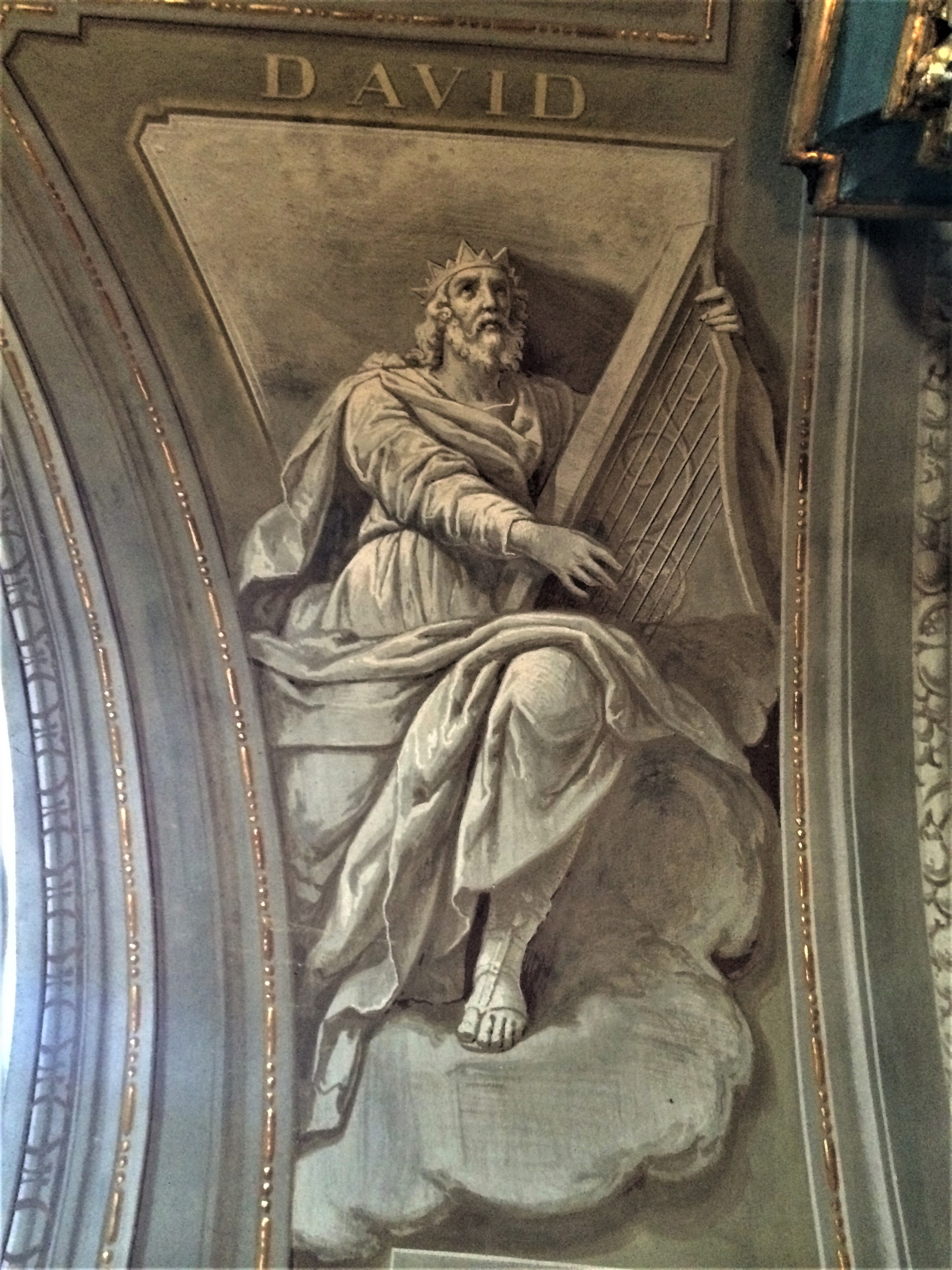
Chiaroscuro Church of San Giovanni Battista di Caraglio

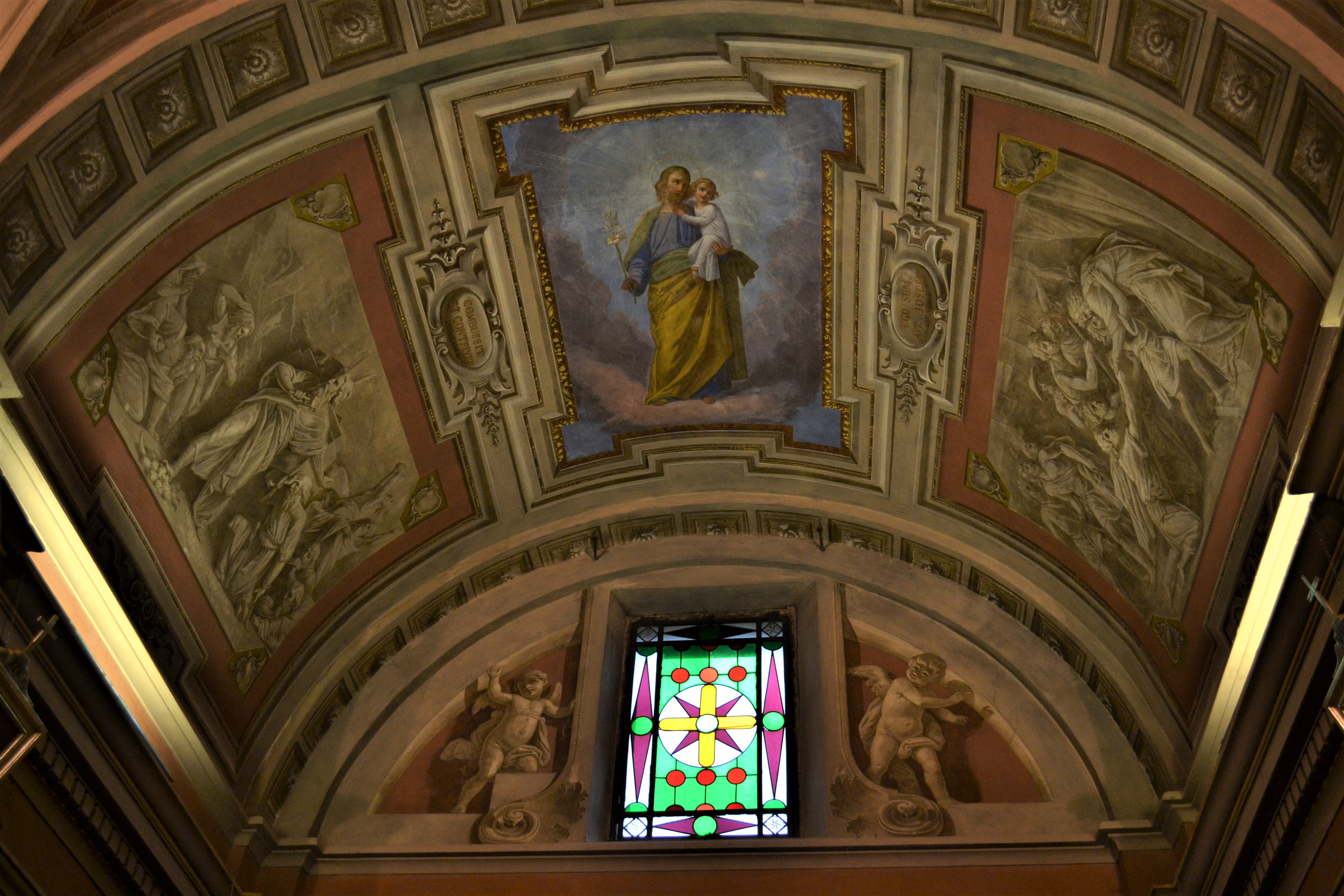
Frescoes and Chiaroscuros Sanctuary San Magno in Busca

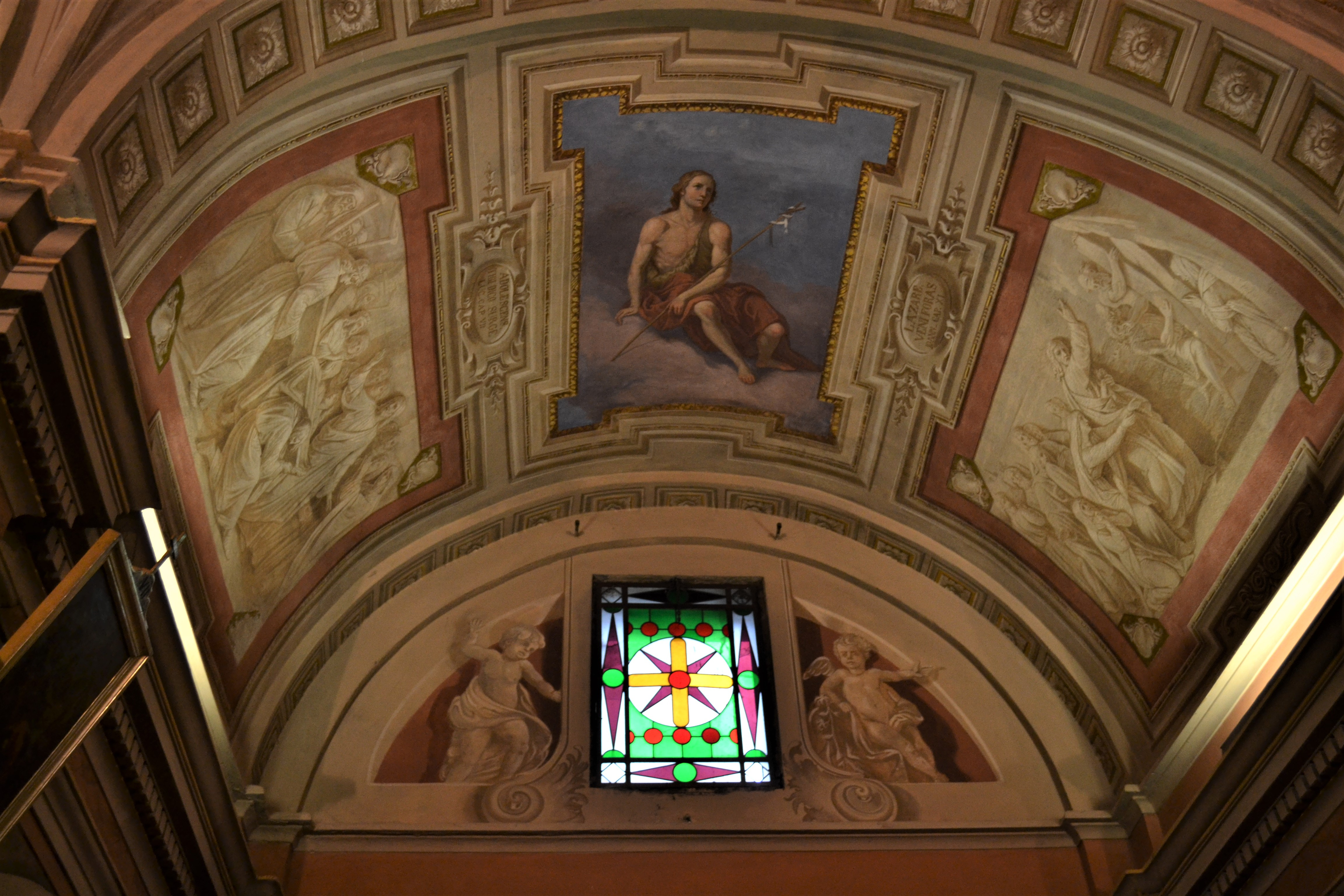
Frescoes and Chiaroscuros Sanctuary San Magno in Busca

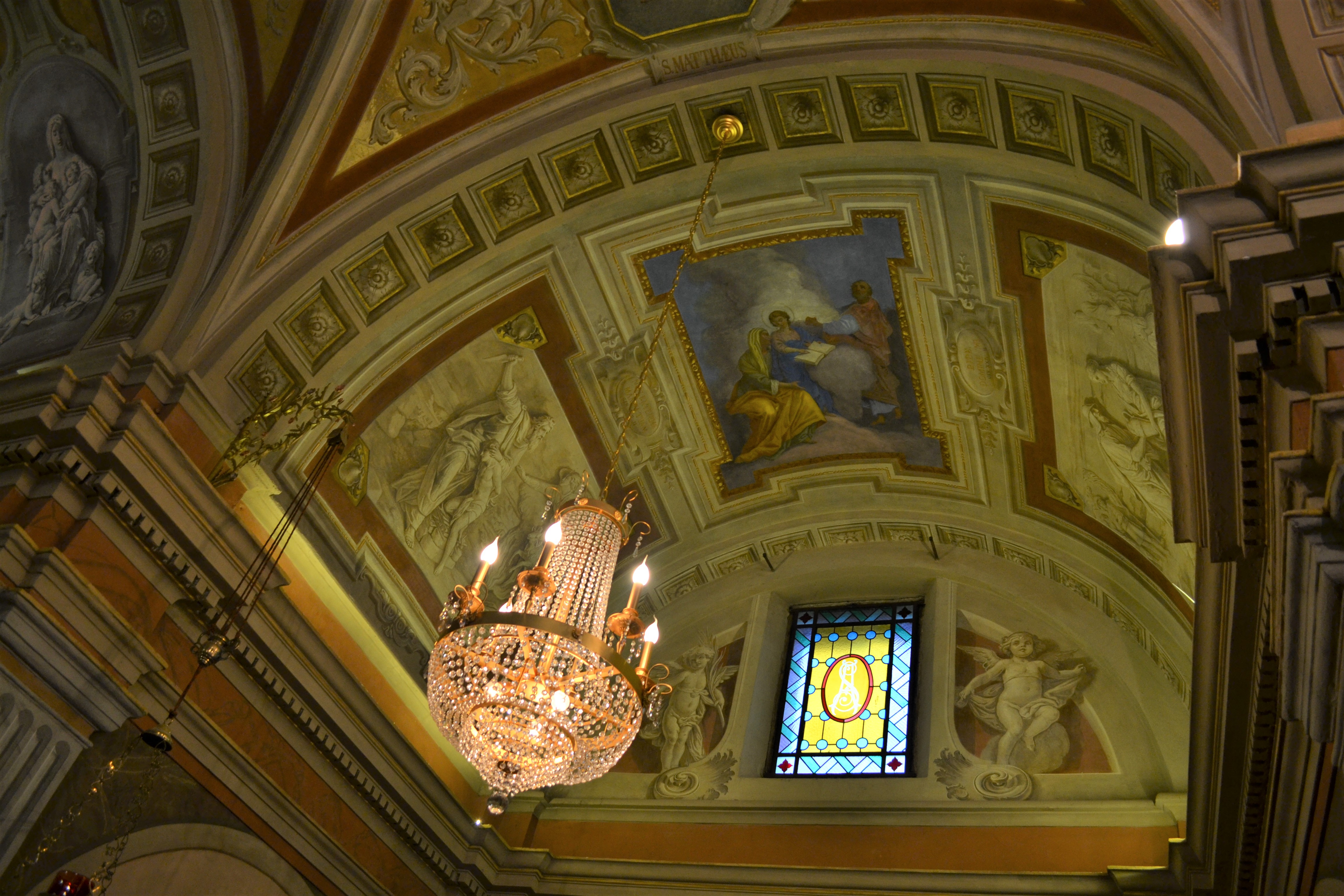
Frescoes and Chiaroscuros Sanctuary San Magno in Busca

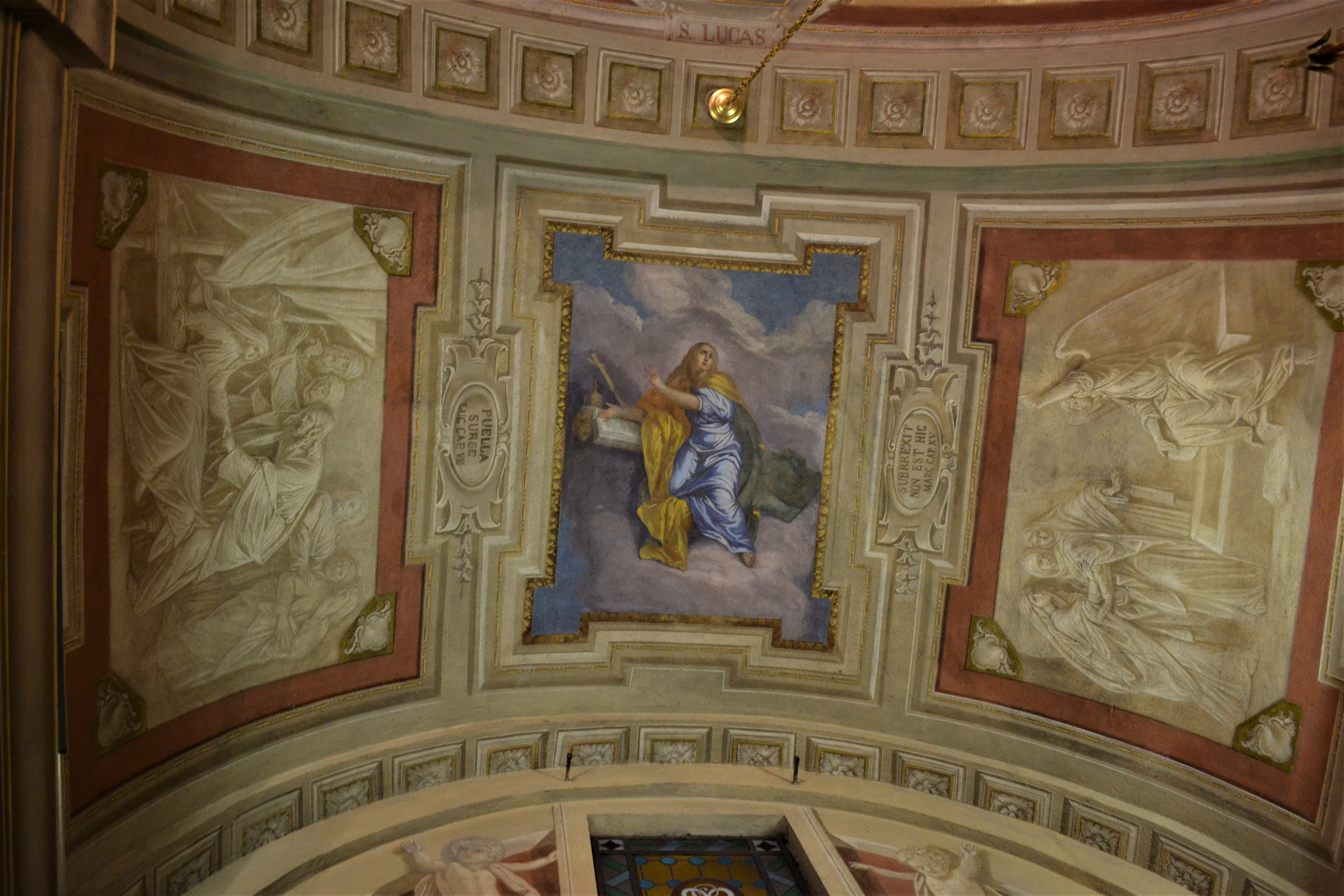
Frescoes and Chiaroscuros Sanctuary San Magno in Busca

== Bibliography ==
- COMANDUCCI, A. M.: Dizionario illustrato pitti e incisori italiani moderni. OVEM. Milán. 1945.
  - Agostino Mario Comanducci (1891–1940): Italian critic and art historian.
- COMANDUCCI, A. M.: Dizionario illustrato dei pittori e incisori italiani moderni e contemporanei. Patuzzi. Milán. 1962.
- Dizionario Enciclopedico Bolaffi dei pittori e degli incisori italiani dall'XI al XX secolo; Vol. 1: Abacco-Bellori. Turín. 1972.
  - Giulio Bolaffi: italian editor .
- Thieme-Becker: Allgemeines Lexikon der bildenden Künstler. Leipzig. Ed. de 1992.
  - Full Title: Allgemeines Lexikon der bildenden Künstler von der Antike bis zur Gegenwart (General dictionary of visual artists from antiquity to today).
  - Ulrich Thieme (1865–1922): German art historian, and grandfather of the painter Peter Flinsch; he was editor of volumes I to XV.
  - Felix Becker (Karl Günther Ernst Felix Becker, 1864 – 1928): German art historian; he was editor of volumes I to IV.
- "St Peter's Italian Church in London". Luca Mateo Stanca. (English translation by Michael Coffey)
  - Original Title: "La Chiesa Italiana di San Pietro a Londra". First Edition, July 2001. Printed by Salemi Pro. Edit, Rome.
- "Arte nel territorio diocesi di Saluzzo di Allemano Romano". Sonia Damiano, Giovanna Galante Garrone. Saluzzo 2008. SKU: 9788873202080.
