= Maria Antonietta Torriani =

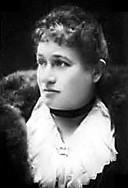
- Born: 1 January 1840; Novara, Italy
- Died: 24 March 1920 (aged 80); Turin, Italy
- Occupation: Writer

Maria Antonietta Torriani (1 January 1840 – 24 March 1920) was an Italian journalist and fiction writer. Much of her work was published under the pen name Marchesa Colombi, a character in the comedy La satira e Parini by Paolo Ferrari.

== Early life and education ==
She was born in Novara in the Piedmont region of Northern Italy on 1 January 1840. Her father, Luigi Torriani, was a watchmaker, and her mother, Carolina Imperatori, was an elementary school teacher. A year after her birth, her father died at the age of 32. She had an older sister, Giuseppina, and a younger half-brother, Tommaso. She attended the primary school where her mother taught, and spent four years at the Bellini Institute of Arts and Crafts, where she excelled academically. She earned her teaching diploma studying at a convent in the Lake Orta region.

== Career ==
While at the convent, she began corresponding with the journalist Eugenio Torelli Viollier, who went on to found the Corriere della Sera, one of Italy's oldest newspapers. In 1865, her stepfather died, leaving her a fortune, and soon afterwards she bought a home in Milan. There she became friends with the feminist leader Anna Maria Mozzoni. The two women organised a series of conferences in 1871, lecturing in Genoa, Florence, and Bologna. In Bologna she befriended writers Enrico Panzacchi and Giosuè Carducci.

She married Eugenio Torelli Viollier in 1875. She was active in the literary scene of Milan, and published in journals such as Il Passatempo and L'Illustrazione Italiana. She published an etiquette book in 1877, La gente per bene, which was reprinted 22 times over the next two decades. She went on to write over 40 books, mostly consisting of short stories and novels intended for women and children, as well as two opera libretti. She also translated several works from French and English into Italian. Much of her fiction is realistic and calls attention to women's issues of her day. For example, In risaia (1878) focuses on the poor working conditions of the mondine, weeders in the rice paddies of Northern Italy. She also worked with "Neera" (Anna Radius Zuccari) to manage the journal Vita Intima.

Following the suicide of her niece Eva, she separated from her husband and moved to Turin. She gave up writing, but remained active socially, establishing a salotto, or salon, frequented by musicians, intellectuals, and writers such as Arrigo Boito and Giuseppe Giacosa. She founded an organization to help the needy and during World War I she organized a group that provided soldiers with warm clothing. She died in Turin on 24 March 1920.

After her death, her work was largely forgotten until it was revived in the 1970s by Natalia Ginzburg and Italo Calvino. One of her best known works, Un matrimonio in provincia (1885) was translated to English by Paula Sperling Paige and published as A Small-Town Marriage in 2001. A reviewer in Italian Americana called it a "short masterpiece", and another in Kirkus Reviews called it "a trailblazing work, in its way, and a most welcome rediscovery".
