= Buscaglione =

Buscaglione is an Italian surname. Notable people with the surname include:

- Fred Buscaglione (1921–1960), Italian singer and actor
- Giovanni Buscaglione (1874–1941), Italian-Colombian architect
- Giuseppe Buscaglione (1868–1928), Italian painter
