= Paolo Ferrari =

Paolo Ferrari may refer to:

- Paolo Ferrari (actor) (1929–2018), Italian actor
- Paolo Ferrari (writer) (1822–1889), Italian dramatist
