= Giovanni Battista Quadrone =

Italian painter (1844–1898)

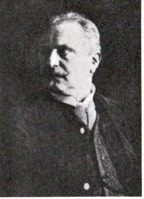
- Born: 1844; Mondovì, Duchy of Savoy
- Died: November 23, 1898 (aged 53–54); Turin, Kingdom of Italy
- Education: Enrico Gamba
- Alma mater: Accademia Albertina
- Known for: Genre paintings

Giovanni Battista Quadrone (1844 – November 23, 1898) was an Italian painter, mainly of genre scenes.

== Biography ==
He was a resident of Turin. He was born to a relatively wealthy family of marble merchants. His family encouraged his art studies, and Quadrone enrolled in the Accademia Albertina, where he studied with Enrico Gamba and Gaetano Ferri (1822–1896) and won the Triennial competition. He initially painted in a realistic style, but this changed after traveling to Paris in 1870, where he worked in the studios of Jean-Léon Gérôme and befriended Giuseppe De Nittis. Back in Turin, he continued to paint genre scenes, mainly of laborers in folkloric dress. He also painted many scenes of hunting, often with dogs, and horse-racing themes. He was mainly represented by the Florentine gallery of Luigi Pisani. In the 1880s, he travelled frequently to Sardinia, where he was married.

Although sometimes referred to as the "Italian Meissonier, some later critics called him a Flemish Piedmontese, reflecting his ardent adhesion to realism in his animal paintings. The Museo Borgogna of Vercelli displays his Lo studio dello scultore (1891). He painted this subject of the artist in his studio on other occasions: Vergognosa! (1875, found in Galleria Civica d'Arte Moderna of Turin); Ogni occasione è buona (1878); and Il pittore e la modella - In cerca del soggetto (1882, also in the Museo Borgogna).

At the Exhibition of Turin, in 1880, he displayed: After the rappresentazione; A naturalist; A painter in his studio; and The Judgement of Paris. In 1880, in Florence, he displayed: A Jesuit; Among Prisoners; and Saltimbanchi. In 1884, he displayed in Turin: Procession in Sardinia; Morning of Market Day in the Piedmont; at Sardinia exhibition; Charity; finally in 1886 at Milan, he sent: Per viaggio, Sardinia, and in 1887 at Venice, il Ronzino Sardo. Among other works are: L' assassinio; Lettura di una poesia giocosa; Il geografo; Accoglienza poco promettente; Partenza per la caccia; Rientro dalla caccia; and Dopo la caccia. He was awarded the cross of knight of the Order of the Crown of Italy.

== Selected paintings ==
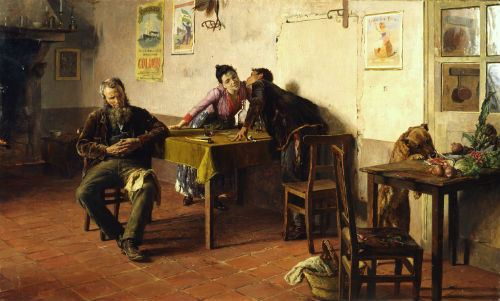
L'occasione fa il ladro
(Opportunity Makes the Thief)

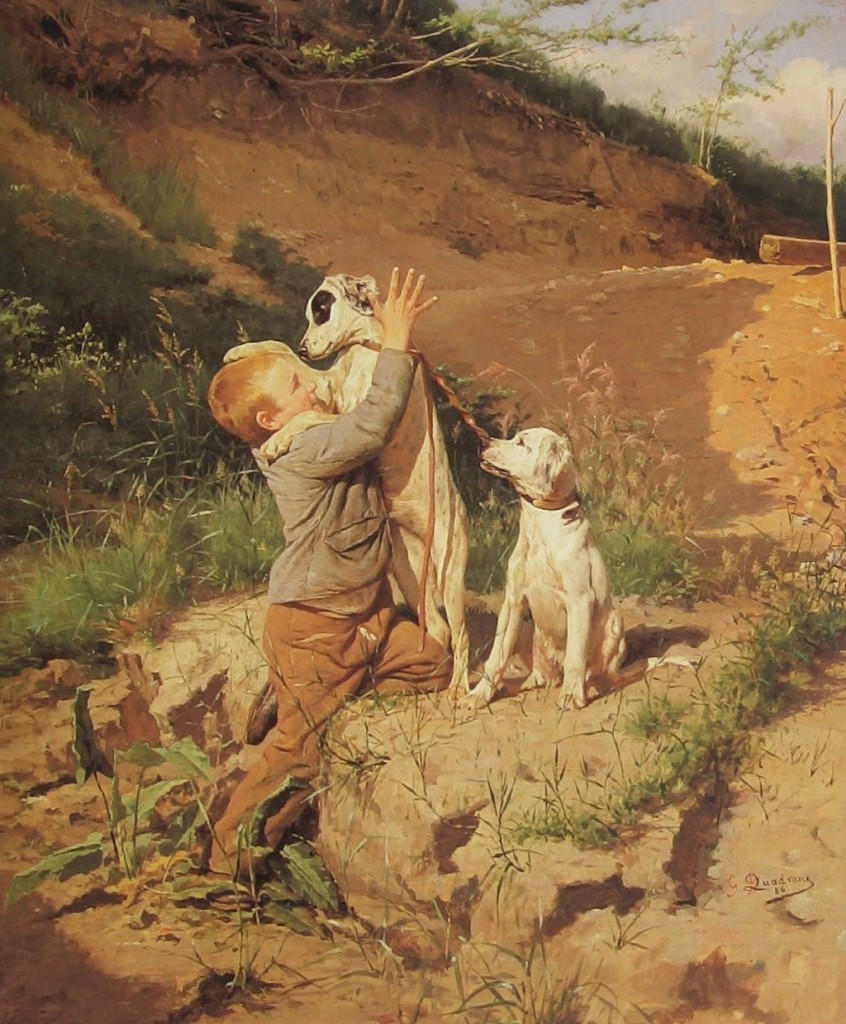
I Bimbi
(The Children)

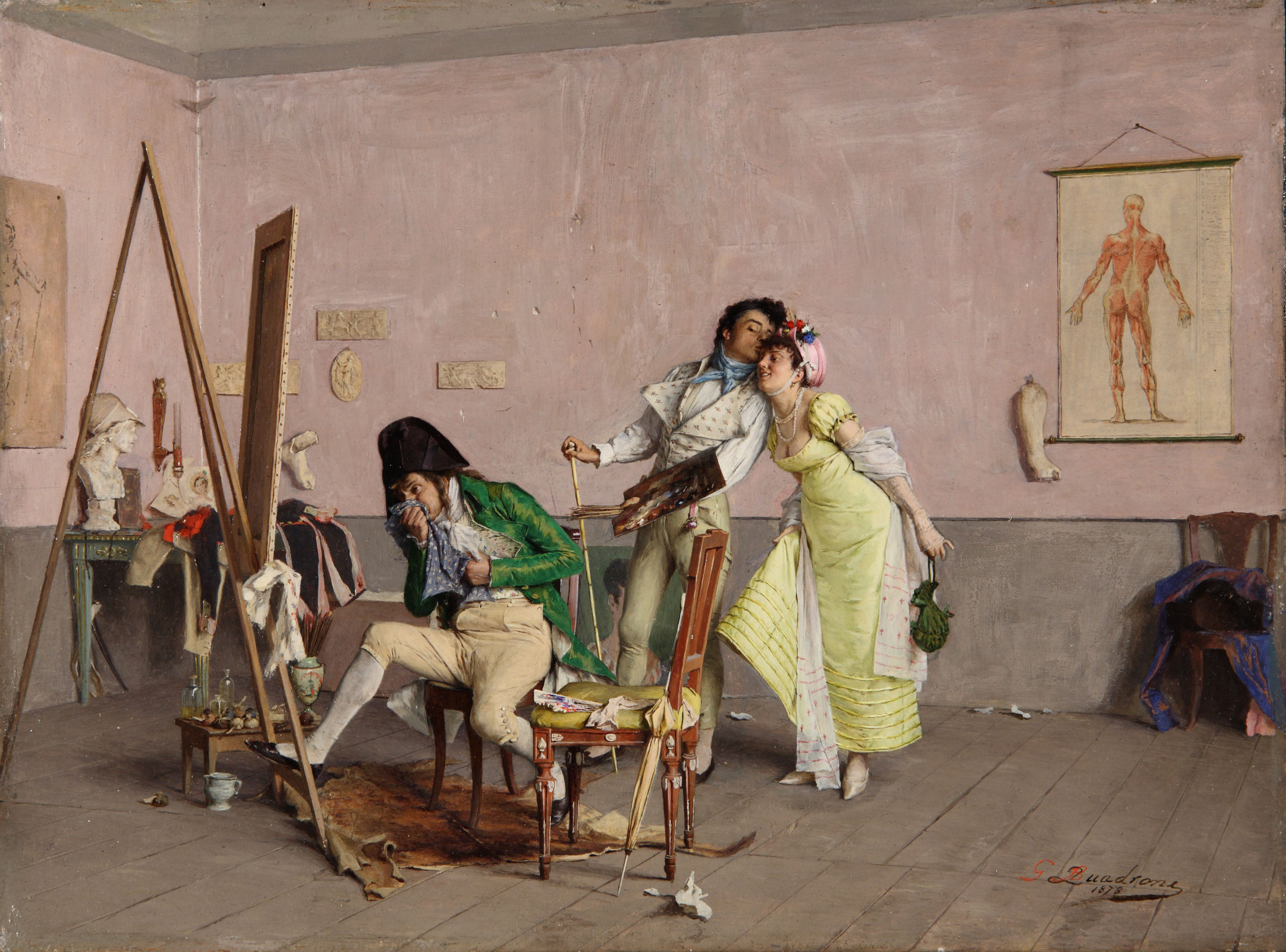
Ogni occasione è buona
(Every Opportunity is Good)
