= Giuseppe Bozzalla =

Italian painter

Giuseppe Bozzalla (1874 – 14 February 1958) was an Italian painter, known for his portrait and landscape work.

He was born in Biella in the Piedmont, son of a factory owner. He finished his education when he was sent to France to learn the nature of the wool industry. Instead he returned to Italy and enrolled in the Albertina Academy in Turin, where he won prizes as a landscape painter and studied figure painting with Giacomo Grosso. His grand-aunt, Carolina Sella was a painter. He was a pupil of Lorenzo Delleani. Among his works is the Sull'Altipiano. In 1903, he exhibited at the Promotrice of Turin the painting Poesia invernale. In 1904, he exhibited Fra colori e vapori inspired by the factories around Biella. He continued to exhibit until at least 1947.
