= Michelangelo Merano =

Italian painter

Michelangelo Merano (born 1867) was an Italian painter, primarily of genre canvases and portraits.

== Biography ==
Gastaldi was born in Racconigi, and he trained at the Accademia Albertina under the painter Andrea Gastaldi and the patronage of Giuseppe Simondetti. He made portraits of Giovanni Battista Diatto and CF Roggeri. Among his other works, are those titled: Maria, Carezze di sole, Sconforto, Fior di terra, Apre les bains, Jolanda, Ave Maria, and Super Nivem Dealbabor.
