= Giacomo Gandi =

Italian painter

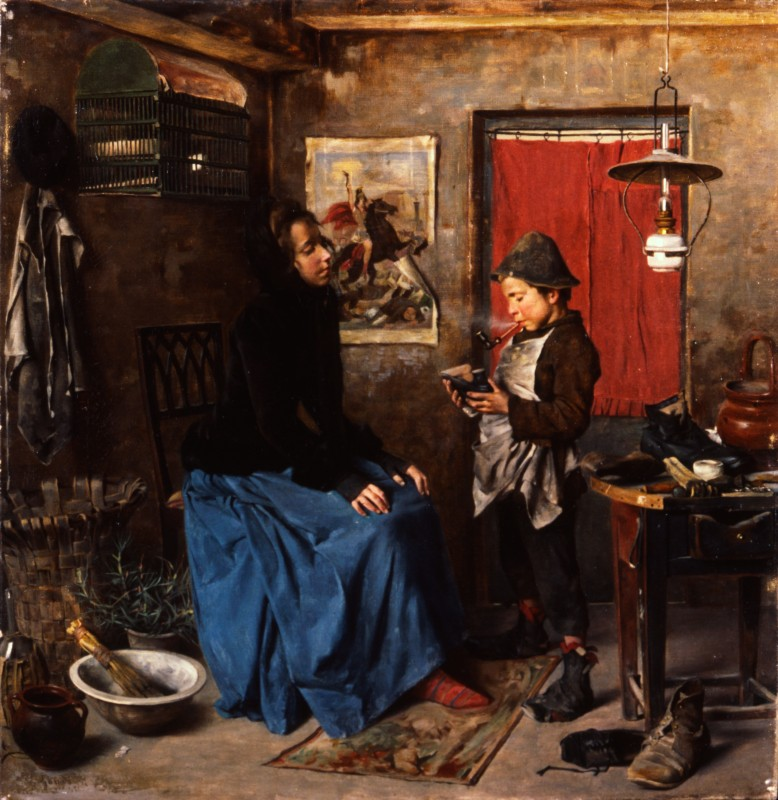
Un parere o Il piccolo calzolaio, c. 1872 (Art collections of Fondazione Cariplo)

Giacomo Gandi (1846–1932) was an Italian painter noted for genre painting.

== Biography ==
He was born in Saluzzo in the Province of Cuneo, Italy, to an author of agricultural texts. After studying briefly under Andrea Gastaldi at the Accademia Albertina in Turin, Giacomo Gandi continued his formation independently by making trips to Florence, Rome – where he settled around 1869 – and Parma. He appears to have prided himself in never setting foot in the Accademia di San Luca in Rome, instead training with a painter by the surname Gigi.

Moving to Savigliano after 1874, he specialised in genre painting and watercolour in which he executed two works for the 1878 Exposition Universelle in Paris. He participated in the national exhibitions in Milan in 1872, Turin in 1880 and 1884, Milan in 1881 and, two years later in the Rome Esposizione di Belle Arti. He also took part in the shows organised by the Società Promotrice di Belle Arti di Torino from 1870 to 1896, as well as those in Genoa, Florence and Naples. The great success of his painting inspired by the life of the common people began to decline towards the end of the 19th century due to the changing tastes of collectors. However, he continued unstintingly to practise his art, albeit in the narrow environment of Savigliano, until the last years of his life when he was prevented from doing so by an eye disease. He died in 1932 in Savigliano. He was named a knight of the Order of the Crown of Italy.

Among his works:

- In Teatro (1880, version exhibited in Turin)
- A mosca cieca
- I piccoli giocatori
- Nel parco
- Al quaresimale
- In tavola
- La mamma assente
- La tabacchiera del Nonno
- Chi sarà?
- Un nemico di casa (1881, exhibited in Milan)
- Prima confessione
- Pianura
- Ave Maria
- Un nuovo parente (1883, exhibited in Rome)
- Sempliciano
- Un sentiero delle Alpi (1884, exhibited in Turin)

== Other projects ==
Media related to Giacomo Gandi at Wikimedia Commons
