= Ottavio Baussano =

Italian painter (1898–1970)

Ottavio Baussano (19 April 1898 – 1970) was an Italian painter and scenic designer.

== Biography ==
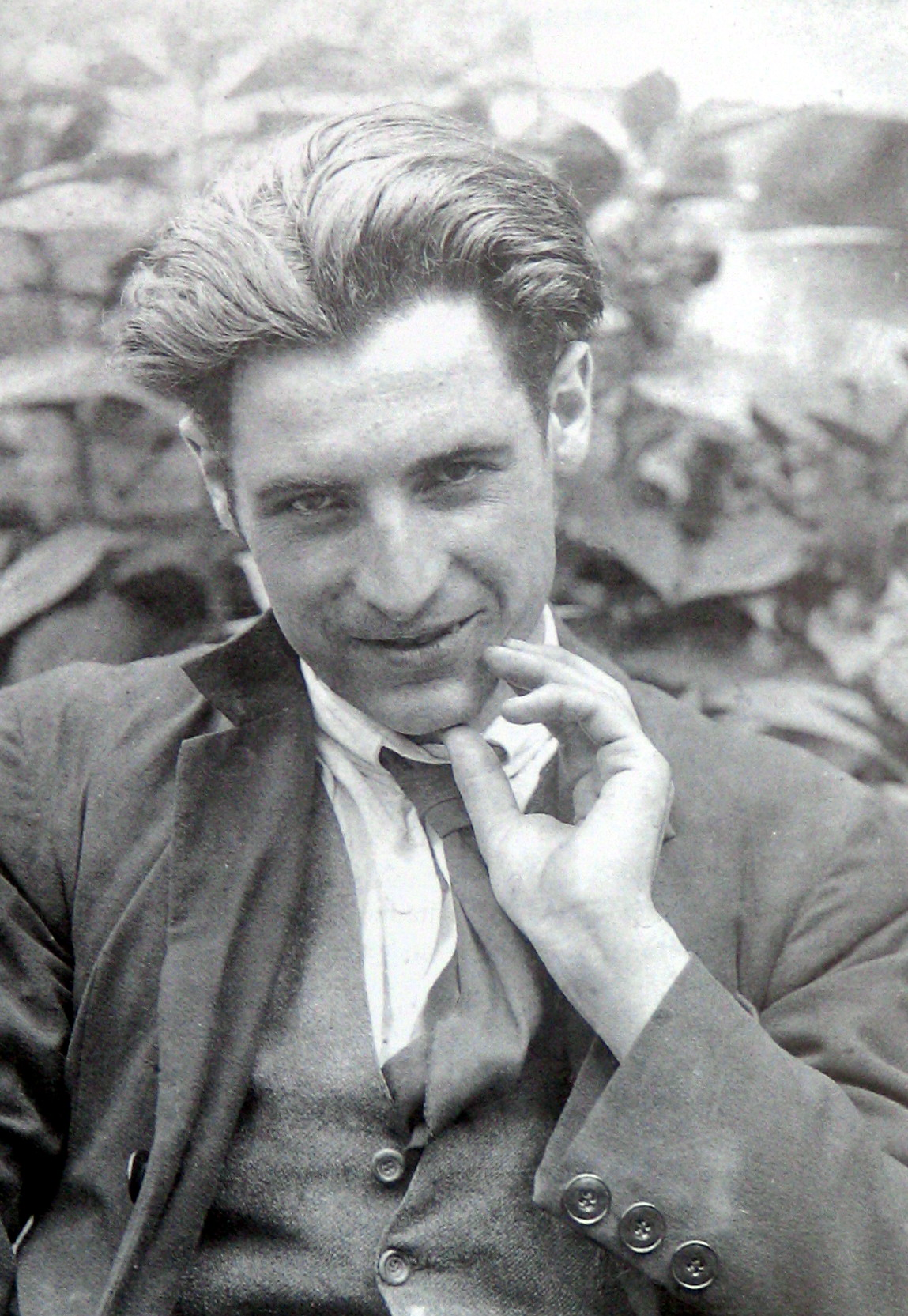
Portrait of Ottavio Baussano

He was born in Asti, and active there in both painting and teaching. As a young man, he was mentored by Canuto Borelli, director of an art institute in Asti. He enrolled to study at the Accademia Ligustica di Belle Arti in Genoa. In the 1930s, during the Fascist rule of Italy, he set a teaching institute. He is known for painting decorations recalling folkloric history and medieval traditions of Asti, such as his works in the Palazzo Communale of Asti depicting elements of the Palio.
