= Canuto Borelli =

Italian lawyer and painter

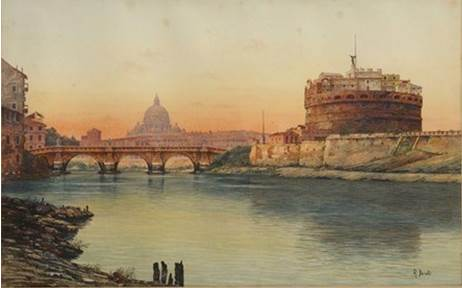
View of Rome with the Castel Sant'Angelo

Canuto Borelli (January 19, 1852 – 1928) was an Italian lawyer and painter, mainly of landscapes and portraits.

== Biography ==
He was a pupil of Enrico Gamba and Antonio Fontanesi at the Albertina Academy. He became director of the Institute of Art and Crafts of Asti. He was an active member and supporter of the cultural scene in the Piedmont, and one of his pupils was Ottavio Baussano.
