= Giulio Branca =

Italian sculptor (1851–1926)

Giulio Branca (December 15, 1851 – February 28, 1926) was an Italian sculptor, active mainly in Milan.

== Biography ==
He was born in Cannobio, a Piedmont town on Lago Maggiore. As a boy, he showed inclination to become an artist. His father Lodovico wanted him to study commerce, but he filled his school books with drawings of soldiers and battles. After a severe illness, his parents relented and allowed him to study art, initially locally under the sculptor Bergonzoli. At 14 years of age, he left of Milan, where he had studied for five years, including two years under the professor Giovanni Strazza.

One of his first works was Monello di campagna (Young Grape-harvester), displayed at the 1873 Viennese Esposition. Other works include a life-size marble statue of Louis XVII, displayed at the 1878 Universal Exposition of Paris; and of Rosmunda al banchetto di Alboino, displayed in 1880 in Turin and awarded a silver medal in the 1883 International Exposition of Amsterdam. He also sculpted the Monument (1884) for the Cazzaniga family in the cemetery of Pavia, and The Apotheosis of the Soul for the monument to Giovanni Norsa in Milan's Main Cemetery, and the monument to the Memory of Carlo Rossi at the same cemetery. The city of Cannobio commissioned from him a larger than life statue of Senator Antonio Giovagnola. He also made a bust of Paolo Ferrari.

Branca became a prominent sculptor in Lombardy. During 1897–1900, he participated in the continual restorations of the Cathedral of Milan. He was decorated with the Order of the Crown of Italy. In 1894, he completed an Ave Maria inspired by Millet and displayed at the second Triennale of the Brera Academy. In 1898 in Turin, he displayed l'Addio dello Spazzacamino (Chimney sweep's Goodbye); in 1906, Voice of Conscience was displayed at the Universal Exposition of Milan; and Ciceronis finis was displayed at the 1915 Brera Triennial.

In Cannobio, he is also remembered for his 1884 Monument to the patriots of May 27–28, 1859 and in Traffiume, a neighborhood of this town, for his Monument to the Fallen (erected 1920). In the gardens of the Archive of the State in Pallanza is conserved the bust of Carlo Cavallini (1886).
