= Enrico Gamba =

Italian painter (1831–1883)

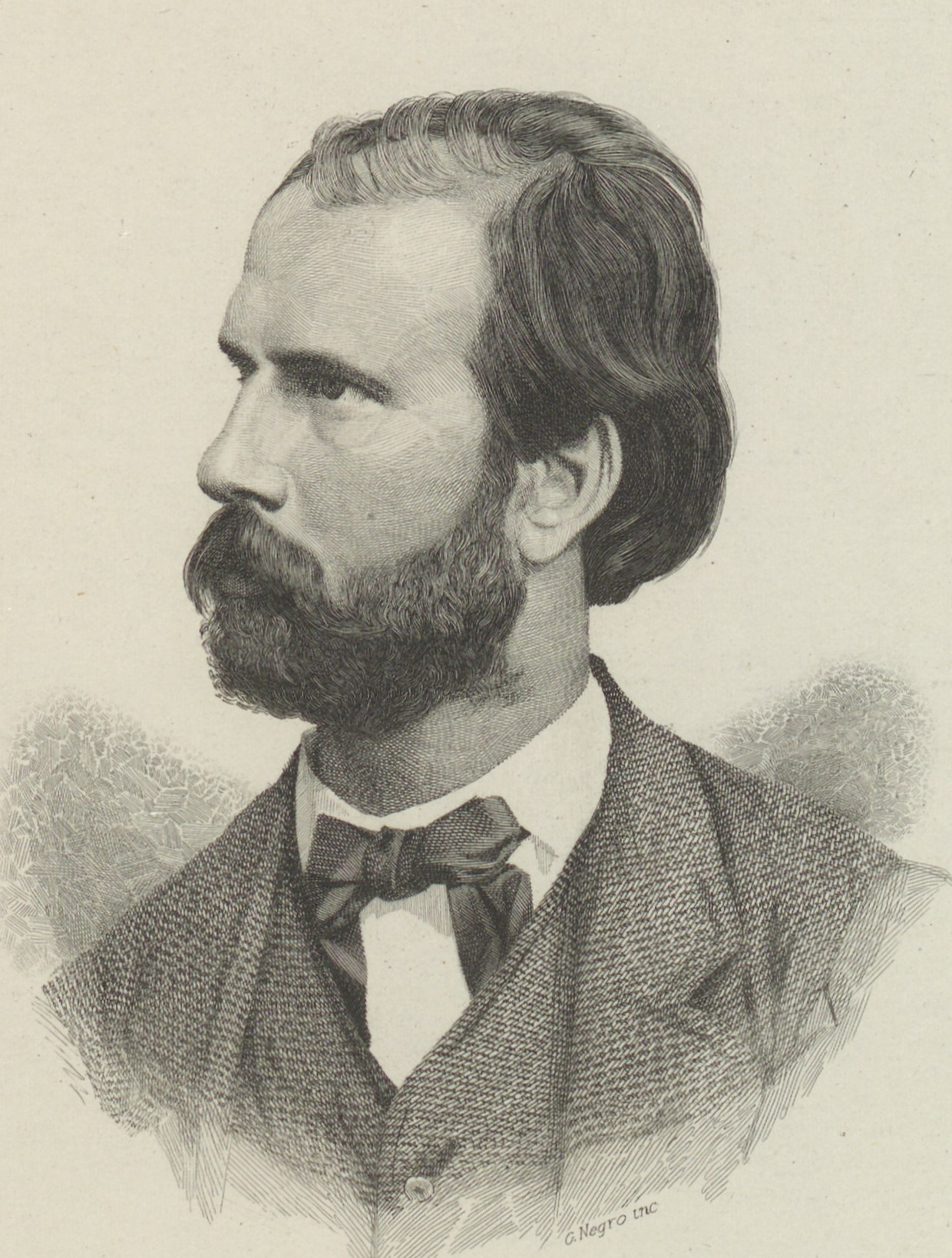
Enrico Gamba, c. 1871 (artist unknown)

Enrico Gamba (3 June 1831 – 19 October 1883) was an Italian painter of genre scenes, period pieces and a few portraits.

== Biography ==
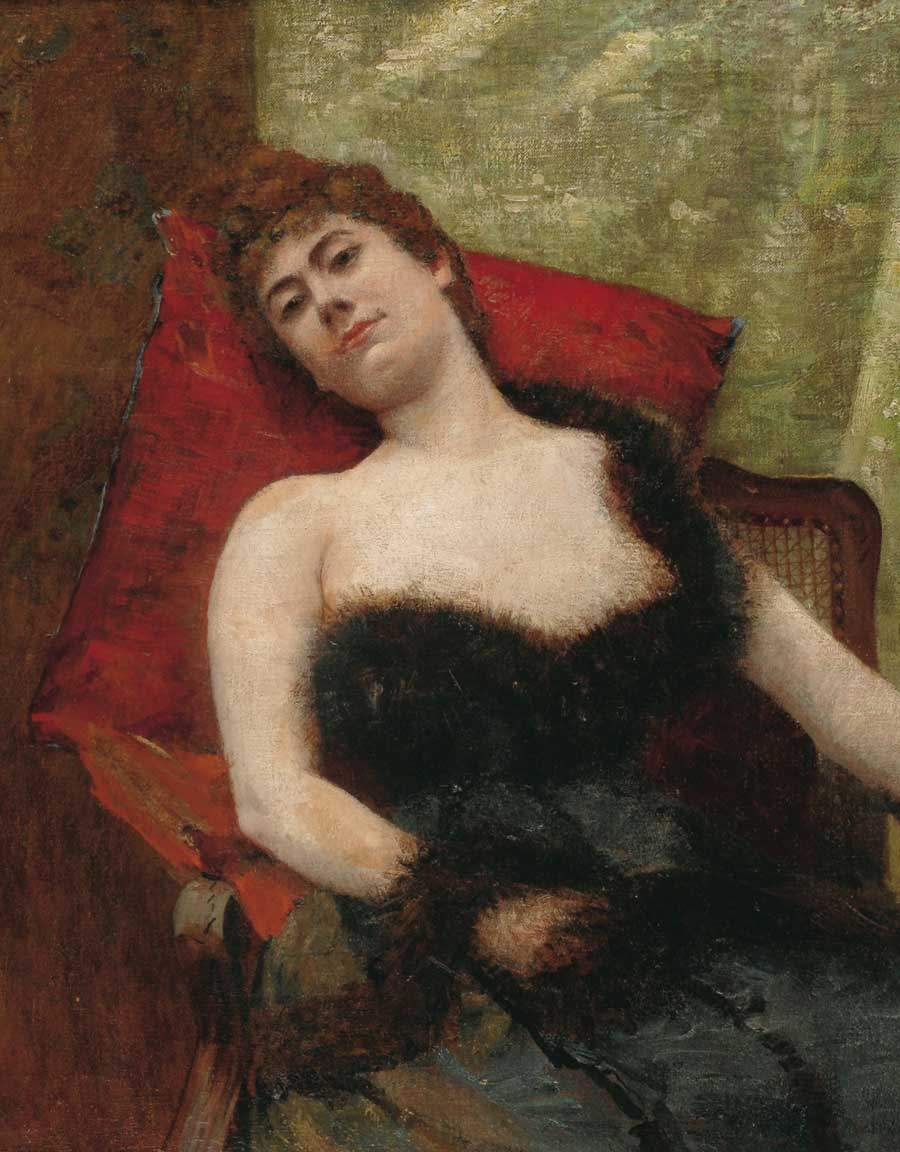
Repose

He was born in Turin. His father worked for the Royal Accounting Office. He was the younger brother of Francesco Gamba, who was already well-established as a painter when Enrico was a boy. At the age of twelve, he was enrolled at the Accademia Albertina, where he studied with Michele Cusa, Giovanni Marghinotti and Carlo Arienti.

In 1850, he went to Germany, where he studied at the Städelschule in Frankfurt with Eduard von Steinle. After graduating, he toured Northern Europe with his friend, the English painter Frederic Leighton, then returned to Italy, where they frequented the Antico Caffè Greco and came to be influenced by Friedrich Overbeck.

His first major exhibitions were in 1854, at the "Promotrice di Torino", and 1855 at the "Esposizione di Brera", where he presented one of his best-known works, Titian's Funeral, which was bought by the Royal Family. That same year, he visited Leighton's studio in Paris and obtained a teaching position at the Albertina. Three of his best-known students there were Luigi Capello, Giovanni Battista Quadrone and Canuto Borelli.

In 1860, the Ministry of Public Instruction commissioned him to paint a scene of King Victor Amadeus II giving aid to the victims of the War of the Spanish Succession. The painting, completed in 1864, was exhibited at the Exposition Universelle in 1867.

Following Italian unification, he devoted himself primarily to institutional work involving patriotic scenes from the Risorgimento period. In 1872, he created another well-known work, showing the playwright Carlo Goldoni studying the common people for inspiration. It was presented at a major exposition in Venice.

He collaborated with Andrea Gastaldi in restoring the Cathedral of Chieri and, from 1882 to 1883, painted some Stations of the Cross for the Church of San Gioacchino in Turin. He also painted two curtains for theaters in Baltimore and Buenos Aires. He died in Turin in 1883.

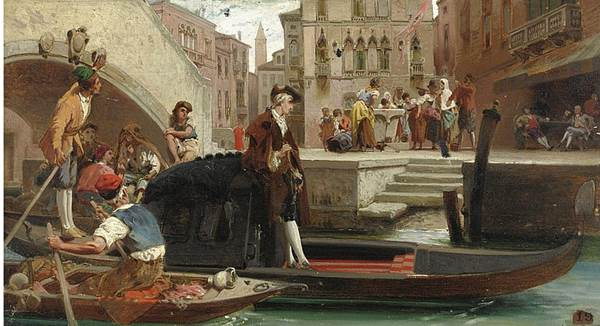
Carlo Goldoni Seeking Inspiration
