= Giuseppe Buscaglione =

Italian painter

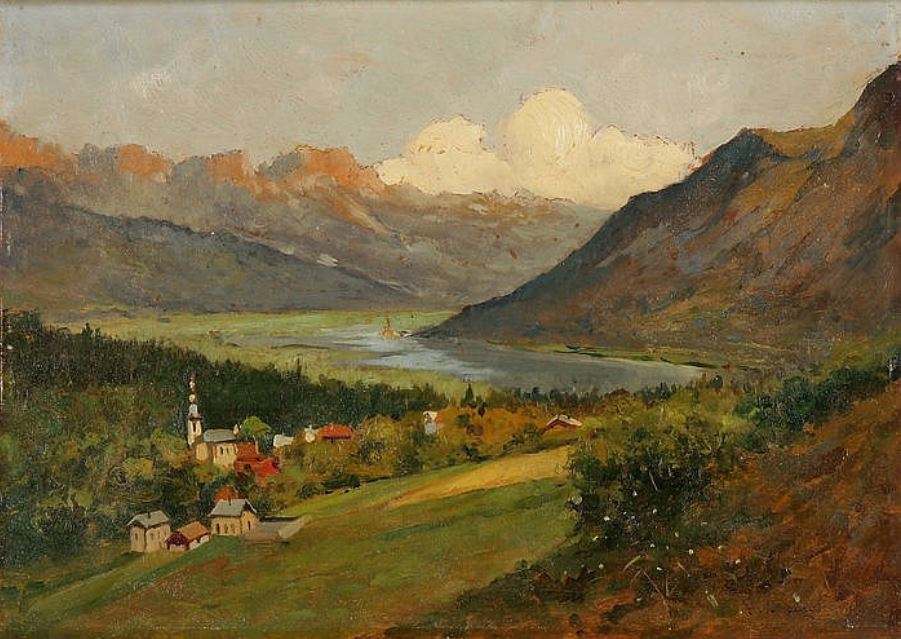
Piedmontese Landscape

Giuseppe Buscaglione (August 17, 1868 – 30 March 1928) was an Italian painter, known primarily for landscapes.

== Biography ==
Buscaglione was born at Ariano di Puglia (now Ariano Irpino in Campania), to a family originally from Biella in the Piedmont. He was a pupil of Lorenzo Delleani at the Accademia Albertina, who inspired his interest in landscapes. He exhibited frequently and widely, in Turin, Venice, Milan, Trieste and Palermo.

Although long forgotten, he has recently enjoyed a renewal of interest, especially in Piedmont. Much of his work is set in Liguria and Lombardy, and all of his canvases carry notations, giving precise locations and times.

He died near Turin, in the commune of Rivoli.

== Sources ==
- Notes on his work @ Antichita Fiorio
- Dizionario biografico universale by Gottardo Garollo, 1907, pg.396
