= Carlo Arienti =

Italian painter

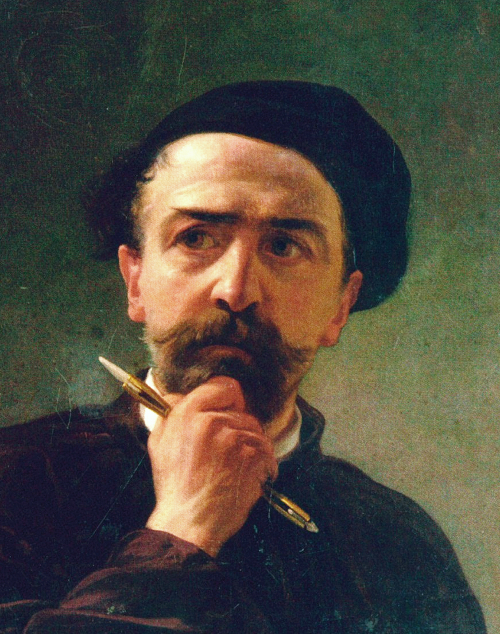
Self-portrait (1860)

Carlo Arienti (21 July 1801, Arcore – 21 March 1873, Bologna) was an Italian painter; known primarily for historical and Biblical scenes.

== Biography ==
He was born to Gaetano Arienti, the Director of the botanical gardens in Mantua. His interest in art began at an early age. He initially taught himself by copying the works he saw at the Palazzo Ducale and the Palazzo del Te. When he was thirteen, his father died and the family fell into poverty. Later, when he had come of age, he moved to Milan and enrolled at the Accademia di Belle Arti di Brera, where he studied with the painter, Luigi Sabatelli, and the sculptor, Camillo Pacetti. He helped provide for his family by making drawings and engravings for upper class patrons. His public debut came in 1823.

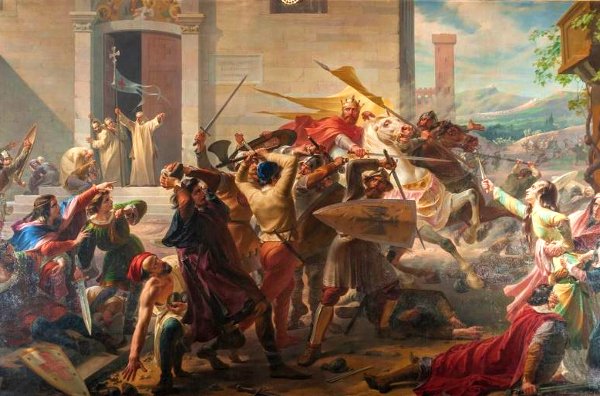
The Expulsion of Frederick Barbarossa from Alessandria

Thanks to financial assistance from an old friend of his father, he was able to attend the Accademia di San Luca in Rome. He was there until 1829, when he returned to Milan and exhibited six paintings at the Brera. In 1831, he created a scene from an opera by Vincenzo Bellini, which attracted commissions for historical paintings from several of the noble Lombard families.

During this period, the historian Carlo Giuseppe Londonio, who was President of the Accademia Brera, called him to serve as a Professor for three years, standing in for his former teacher, Sabatelli, who was engaged in painting frescoes at the Palazzo Pitti. Although depressed by the death of his wife, he was able to complete commissions for Emperor Ferdinand I of Austria and King Charles Albert of Sardinia. These works, and others like them, earned him a chair at the Accademia Albertina in 1843. He remained there, in Turin, until 1859.

In 1855, he displayed two paintings at the Exposition Universelle in Paris. Both had been created during the Revolutions of 1848. One was a scene from the Pazzi Conspiracy. The other, commissioned by King Charles Albert, depicted the expulsion of Frederick Barbarossa from Alessandria, with the King in the role of "Gagliaudo", a quick-witted peasant who supposedly ended Barbarossa's siege. At the time, Northern Italy was struggling to gain independence from the Austrian Empire and was seeking to make allies of the French. The publicity given to his paintings was part of that process.

Following the defeat of Austria in 1859, he was named a Commander in the Order of Saints Maurice and Lazarus and received several commissions from King Victor Emmanuel II. That same year, for reasons which are unclear, he had a clash with Marquis Ferdinando Arborio Gattinara di Breme, President of the Albertina. As a result, the Marquis helped Arienti's rival, Giovanni Marghinotti, to oust him from his chair. The following year, he moved to Modena, but stayed only briefly, then went to Bologna. There, he was appointed Director of the Accademia di Belle Arti. His students included Enrico Gamba, Bartolomeo Giuliano, Giuseppe Costa, Lorenzo Delleani and Costantino Sereno.

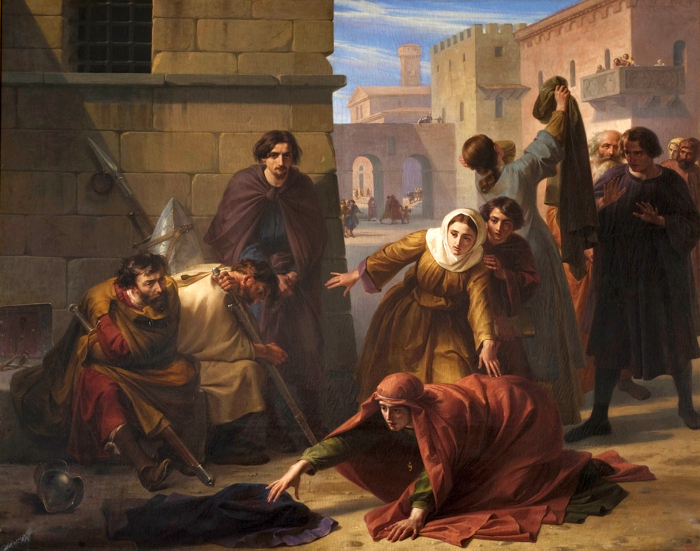
The Origins of the Lombard League (his last painting)

In 1869, he entered a competition and was awarded several large commissions, but suffered a stroke that left him partially paralyzed and unable to complete them. He continued discharging his duties, with the help of two assistants but, in 1871, all three were implicated in irregularities committed during an admissions contest and he was dismissed. He died two years later and is interred in the cemetery at the Certosa di Bologna, next to his second wife, Lorenzina.
