= Michele Cusa =

Italian painter (1799–1870)

- Born: 1799
- Died: October 17, 1870 (aged 70–71)
- Education: Brera Academy
- Known for: Painting

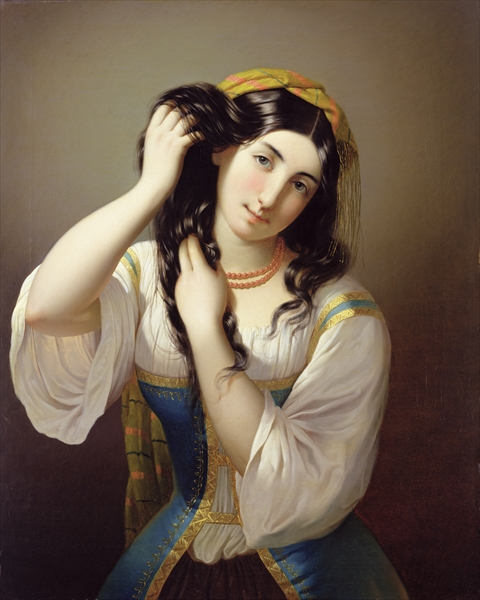
A Sicilian Woman Playing with Her Hair

Michele Cusa (1799 – October 17, 1870) was an Italian painter.

He was born in Rimella Valsesia. He trained initially in Varallo, then studied at the Brera Academy of Milan under Giuseppe Gaudenzio Mazzola from Valduggia. In Turin in 1828, he won a stipend to study in Rome until he was recruited by the King of Sardinia-Piedmont to teach at the Albertina Academy.

Late in life he retired to Varallo, where he worked at reproducing in two dimensions all the scenes depicted in the 45 chapels of the Sacro Monte di Varallo. Cusa's work was published in 1862. He earned the Cross of Knights of the Order of Santi Maurizio e Lazzaro.
