= Paolo Ferrari (writer) =

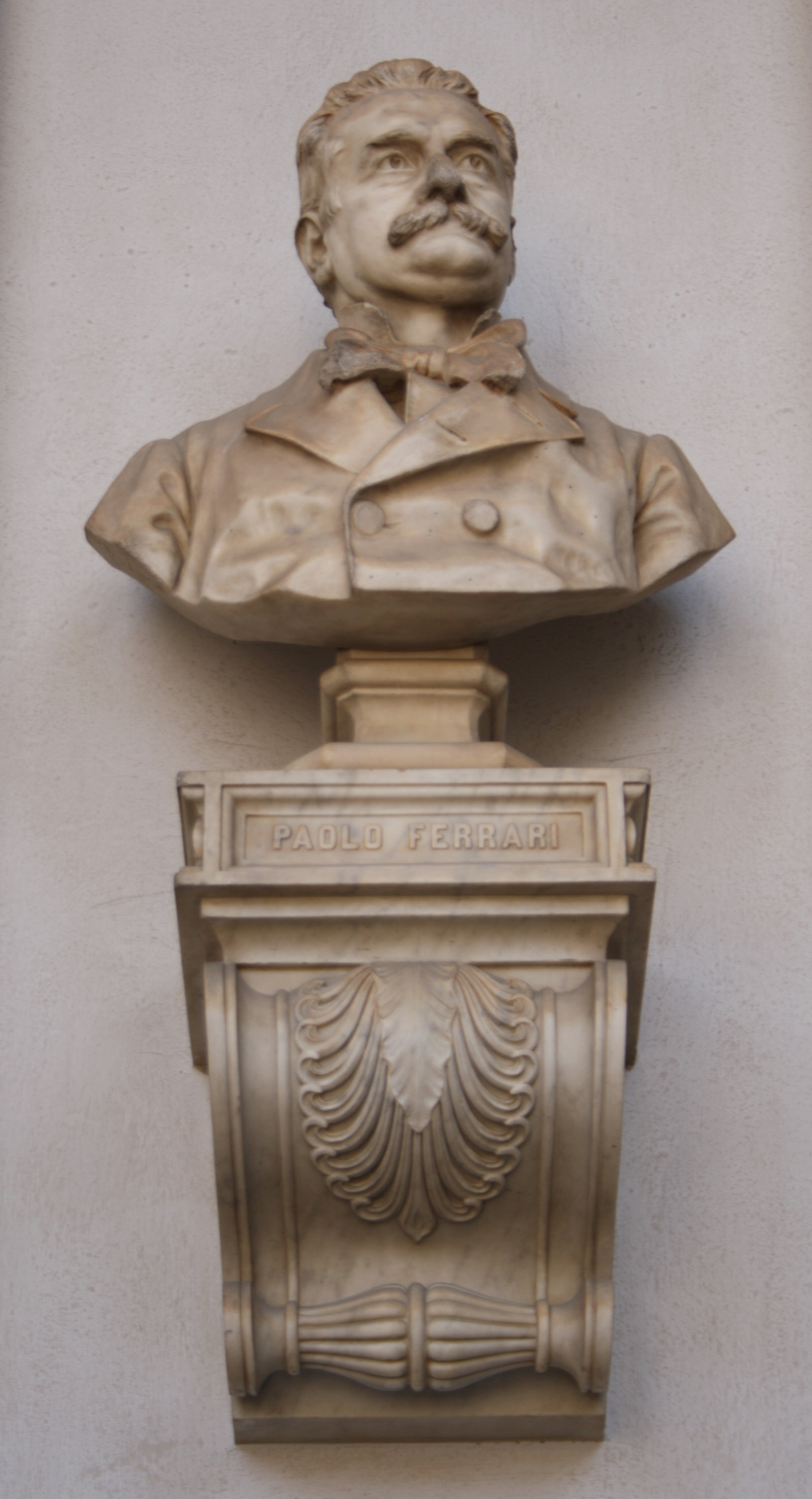
Giulio Branca, bust of Paolo Ferrari.

Paolo Ferrari (1822–1889), Italian dramatist, was born at Modena. His numerous works, chiefly comedies, and all marked by a fresh and piquant style, are the finest product of the modern Italian drama. After producing some minor pieces, in 1852 he made his reputation as a playwright with Goldoni e le sue Sedici Commedie. Among numerous later plays his comedy Parini e la Satira (1857) had considerable success. Ferrari may be regarded as a follower of Carlo Goldoni, modelling himself on the French theatrical methods. in 1860 he was appointed professor of history at Modena and afterwards at Milan. His collected plays were published in 1877–1880 in 14 volumes.

== Biography ==
The son of an officer, he graduated from the University of Modena and Reggio Emilia with a law degree. Of liberal ideas, he soon began both his activities as a patriot and Conspiracy and his career as a playwright, in which he achieved considerable success with brilliant comedies in the Goldonian style, including Goldoni and his sixteen new comedies (1851), judged by Luigi Capuana to be “the finest comedy written in Italian in the first half of the running century,” La satira e Parini (1853) and, in Modenese dialect, La medseina d'onna ragaza amalèda (1859), later translated and performed in Italian as well. La medseina d'onna ragaza amalèda (1859), later also translated and performed in Italian. From Modena, where he was secretary of the University and professor of history in the city high school, he moved in 1861 to the Scientific-Literary Academy of Milan, where he was professor of Modern History and then of Literature and Aesthetics, also holding the position of dean between 1875 and 1877.

In the Lombard capital, he was briefly a city councilor, maintained fertile relations with intellectuals and politicians of the time, such as Pietro Cossa, Felice Cavallotti and Giuseppe Giacosa, and, with literary production, switched to the bourgeois theater with theses, moralistic with plays such as Il duello (1868), Il ridicolo (1872), Il suicidio (1875), and Le due dame (1877), which were favorably received by the public but earned him, over the years, increasing criticism, including that of Benedetto Croce, who called them “embodied categorical imperatives.” His Manuscript are preserved in the Museo del Teatro alla Scala, next to which is the square named after him. He was married to Ersilia Branchini and fathered seven children. He is buried in Modena.

Dedicated to Paolo Ferrari are a street in Modena, where the Museo Casa Enzo Ferrari is located, and, in Milan, the square adjacent to the La Scala theater.
