= Domenico Buratti =

Italian painter, poet and illustrator

- Born: 21 November 1881; Nole, Italy
- Died: 24 May 1960 (aged 78); Turin, Italy
- Education: Accademia Albertina
- Known for: painting, illustration, poetry
- Spouse: Vittoria Cocito (m. 1920)

Domenico Buratti (21 November 1881 – 24 May 1960) was an Italian painter, poet and illustrator.

== Biography ==
He was born at Nole a humble carpenter family; very early in his life he moved to Turin, where he attended the Accademia Albertina and, as soon as he was fifteen, he enrolled on the courses of Drawing and Painting held by Giacomo Grosso and Paolo Gaidano. At the Academy he developed close friendships with Cesare Ferro and Felice Carena.

In 1903 he made his début at the "Società Promotrice delle Belle Arti" (Fine Arts' Promotion Society) of Turin attracting the interest and curiosity both of the public as well as that of the critics. In 1904 he exhibited in Paris. In the same year he painted one of his most famous pictures, Ribelli (Rebels), a personal interpretation of The Fourth Estate by Giuseppe Pellizza da Volpedo, which was well received mainly due to its technical and chromatic technique.

Domenico Buratti gained quite a fame also thanks to his work as an illustrator. In 1910 he illustrated with watercolours and drawings the poetry book for children Il Cestello ("The Basket") by Angiolo Silvio Novaro, in 1912 La bottega dello stregone ("The sorcerer's shop"). Several years later, in 1937, he illustrated the fairytale book Ruggine ("Rust") by Renzo Pezzani.

In 1913 he met the painter Vittoria Cocito, whom he married in 1920 and from whom he had three daughters, Vanna, Chiaretta and Lella.

In 1917 he left as an infantryman for the World War I front. Following the Italian defeat at Caporetto, he was captured and interned in Dolmen, in Westphalia (Germany). In 1918 he escaped with some comrades and took refuge in the Netherlands. He managed to return to Italy in 1919.

His works show a return to subjects linked to his country and to his traditions as well as to nature; paintings by Buratti of this period include Il presepe (the crèche), Il babbo stipettaio (the father cabinetmaker) and La cuoca (the lady cook), all executed between 1920 and 1923.

In 1928 he took over, with his brother Tino, a small publishing company, the Fratelli Ribet later called "Fratelli Buratti" (the Buratti Brothers) which operated until 1932 publishing works by young writers which were unknown at the time, such as Montale, Alvaro, Stuparich, Slataper.

In 1930 he published his poetry collection Paese e galera ("Country and prison"), which was written while he was a prisoner. Between the end of the Thirties and the beginning of the Forties he developed a greater interest in portrait and landscape. Due to the World War II the Buratti family gathered once again in Nole; the artist's renewed energy was almost entirely concentrated towards poetical creation; in 1945 a second poetry collection, Canzoni di strada (Street songs), written between 1904 and 1930 was released.

His works in this period include mostly still lifes and some portraits. Between 1945 and 1948 he was one of the founders of the "Libera Accademia di Belle Arti" (Fine Arts' Free Academy).

He died in Turin on 24 May 1960 and was buried in Nole.
