= Italo Mus =

Italian painter

- Born: 4 April 1892; Châtillon
- Died: 15 May 1967 (aged 75); Saint-Vincent
- Education: Academy of Fine Arts in Turin
- Known for: Painting
- Awards: The first prize of Young Painters 1910

Italo Mus (4 April 1892 – 15 May 1967) was an Italian painter.

== Early years and family ==
Italo Mus was born in Chaméran, in the municipality of Châtillon to parents from the Aosta Valley. His mother Martine Vallaise was from a noble family of Arnad; his father Eugène Mus was a sculptor from Torgnon. His earliest artistic training took place in his father's workshop where he learn woodcarving. In 1909, recommended by Lorenzo Delleani, he enrolled at the Academy of Fine Arts in Turin and followed the course of painting and drawing. Here his teachers included Giacomo Grosso, Paolo Gaidano, Luigi Onetti and Marchisio: artists faithful to the impressionist tradition, and who taught him the basics of art.

In 1910, the International Center for the Fine Arts in Rome assembled some of the best known painters of the time, including Chagall, Raoul Dufy, Jean Cocteau and Picasso. This was the occasion when the young Mus first gained national recognition, being awarded first prize in the Young Painters’ Salon.

== Career ==
Although very committed to his native Aosta Valley, Mus spent short periods in 1913 working on fresco and restoration projects: first in Lyon and then in Lausanne and in Friesch near Brig in the Swiss the canton of Valais. He took part in the First World War, and while on leave he met Giuseppina Crenna. After the end of the war they married and in due course had four children.

In 1932 Mus was responsible for the Saint-Vincent war memorial. The work, modelled in clay and then cast in bronze in Milan, was of an Alpino holding a weapon in his hand and with a fallen comrade across his knees. No trace of this monument remains: it was melted down in 1940 when its metal was needed for the war effort.

In 1938 the art critic Guido Marangoni saw Mus’s works in his studio and was impressed enough to write an article in the art journal Perseo, describing him as a “highly talented painter.” For a time he worked in his studio at Saint-Vincent with Filippo De Pisis. In 1956 some of his paintings were shown in New York City and Buenos Aires.

In the mid-1960s, while still active, he fell victim to a serious disease which prevented him from continuing to work. Italo Mus died in Saint-Vincent on 15 May 1967.

== Work ==
Mus created about two thousand works: drawings, sketches, and paintings of subjects. For most of his life he used oil on canvas or panel. His activity consists of three clearly defined periods.

- First period: between 1920 and 1940 he created works that characterize the artist in his best years. He painted scenes of life in the Aosta Valley (interior scenes, haymaking, landscapes and dance).
- Second period: between 1941 and 1958, the style of the artist evolved, and his paintings became an excuse to make the color. The imagination takes precedence over reality and the artist also wanted to attract attention by using the technique of the effect of mold on absorbent paper.
- Third period: between 1959 and 1967, the artist returned to his roots with new drawings in ink and charcoal, and sketches for major works in public buildings in the valley. Mus revisited the subjects of his first period—haymaking scenes and interiors that represent a multitude of characters—with the same humanity, but with different characteristics from the paintings of the first period.

== Prizes ==
His work was rewarded by many prizes: the Prix Saint-Vincent (1922-1947-1949), the Prix de la Montagne (‘Prize of the Mountain’, Milan 1927), the Premio Einaudi (1950), the Premio Consiglio dei Ministri (‘Italian Cabinet Prize’, Rome 1959), and the Premio Nazionale d'Arte Sacra (‘National Award for Sacred Art’, Rome 1960).

In 1979 the director Gianpaolo Taddeini made a fictionalised version of Mus’s life, based on a text by Ugo Ronfani, for the RAI-Aosta Valley television station: A valley, a Painter: Italo Mus.

== Selected works ==
- The Revolution clog(1953), oil on panel, Martigny in Switzerland Fair of Valais;
- Chickensdecent(1950), oil on canvas, XXV ((e)) Venice Biennale, Palais central;
- Notre-Dame de Paris(1947), oil on canvas, Paris, Galerie René Denis;
- Stia (1951), oil on canvas, Rome Quadrennial;
- Veduta del Cervino, (1930), oil on canvas
- Still Life con zucche, (1950), oil on canvas
- A Luge on a snowy bridge,(1941), oil on canvas
- The Fucina, (1934), oil on canvas
- Trofeo della Regina, (1940), oil on canvas
- Funghi e Cardi, (1938), oil on canvas

== Bibliography ==
- New under the sun, Quart, 1987, an exhibition catalog Centre Saint-Bénin (Aosta), 19/12/1987-31/03/1988;
- See anthology Milan, 1991, Palais de Permanent 19/04/1991-19/05/1991;
- Centenary of the birth of Aosta, Quart, 1992, the company of Fine Arts in Turin 03/07/1992-03/03/1992;
- Interiors, Quart, 1995, catalogue of an exhibition at Saint-Laurent church in Aosta, 29/06/1995-03/09/1995.

== Sources ==
- (it) This article is partially or wholly derived from a translation of the Wikipedia article in Italian entitled Italo Mus
