= Vittoria Cocito =

Italian painter and illustrator

- Vittoria Cocito, Self portrait, c. 1920
- Born: 16 September 1891; Turin, Italy
- Died: 1 July 1971 (aged 79); Turin, Italy
- Education: Cesare Ferro Milone
- Known for: painting, illustration
- Spouse: Domenico Buratti (m. 1920)

Vittoria Cocito (16 September 1891 – 1 July 1971) was an Italian painter and illustrator.

== Biography ==
Born in Turin, Cocito displayed an early interest in art since her childhood. She wasn't allowed to attend the Academy of Fine Arts by her parents, who considered it a career choice “not suitable for young women” at the time. She then studied painting privately with artist Cesare Ferro. Cocito's first exhibition took place at the Societá Promotrice delle Belle Arti in Turin in 1911, where she was invited to show her painting Portrait of a Lady. She also exhibited her work at the Società Permanente delle Belle Arti in Milan and Naples, at the Associazione Amici dell’Arte in Turin and at the Roman Secession, receiving prizes and awards.

As an illustrator she worked mainly on books for children such as the Italian edition of Hans Christian Andersen’s tales Il fanciullo di Galilea (The Child of Galilee) and Credere (Believe). In 1913 she met the painter Domenico Buratti, whom she married in 1920, despite objections from her family. Together they had three daughters – Vanna, Chiaretta and Lella.

Cocito died in Turin on 1 July 1971.

== Bibliography ==
- Daniela Berta, ed. (2015). Domenico Buratti e Vittoria Cocito (in Italian). Usseglio: Museo Civico 'Arnaldo Tazzetti'. ISBN 978-88-9050-769-4.
