= Arturo Conterno =

Italian painter (1871–1942)

Arturo Conterno (16 April 1871 – 18 November 1942) was an Italian painter, active mainly in Turin.

== Biography ==
Arturo Conterno was born in Turin, where he learned design under Ghirardi, and starting in 1888, studied privately under Giacomo Grosso, who became his friend and mentor. A year later, he enrolled in the Accademia Albertina. He exhibited in 1898 at the Promotrice of Turin, where two of his paintings: Orto Botanico and Spotorno al mattino received awards. He exhibited frequently in Turin at the Circolo degli Artisti and Amici dell’Arte.

His works, including landscapes, genre, and portraits, have the bright chromatic sensibility of post-impressionism or late-Macchiaioli painters. The critic M. Bernardi stated that Conterno affirmed subtlety, the aristocracy of touch, the serene poetry that diffuses from his placid and accurate painterliness Schialvino describes it him as a painter able to depict small things made large by the insufflation of a poetic spirit, depictions, despite the vagary of the subject, full of intimacy, exquisiteness, preciosity, meditation, solemnity, and religion. A retrospective of his work was displayed in 1953 at the Circolo degli Artisti, in Turin.
