= Sanguineti =

Sanguineti is an Italian surname. Notable people with the surname include:

- Adriana Sanguineti (born 2000), Peruvian rower
- Corrado Sanguineti (born 1964), Italian Roman Catholic bishop
- Edoardo Sanguineti (1930–2010), Italian poet
- Giulio Sanguineti (1932–2025), Italian Catholic bishop
- Ilaria Sanguineti (born 1994), Italian racing cyclist
- Nenne Sanguineti Poggi (1909–2012), Italian painter
- Raúl Sanguineti (1933–2000), Argentine chess player

== See also ==
- Sanguinetti, an Italian surname
