= Giovanni Rava =

Italian painter

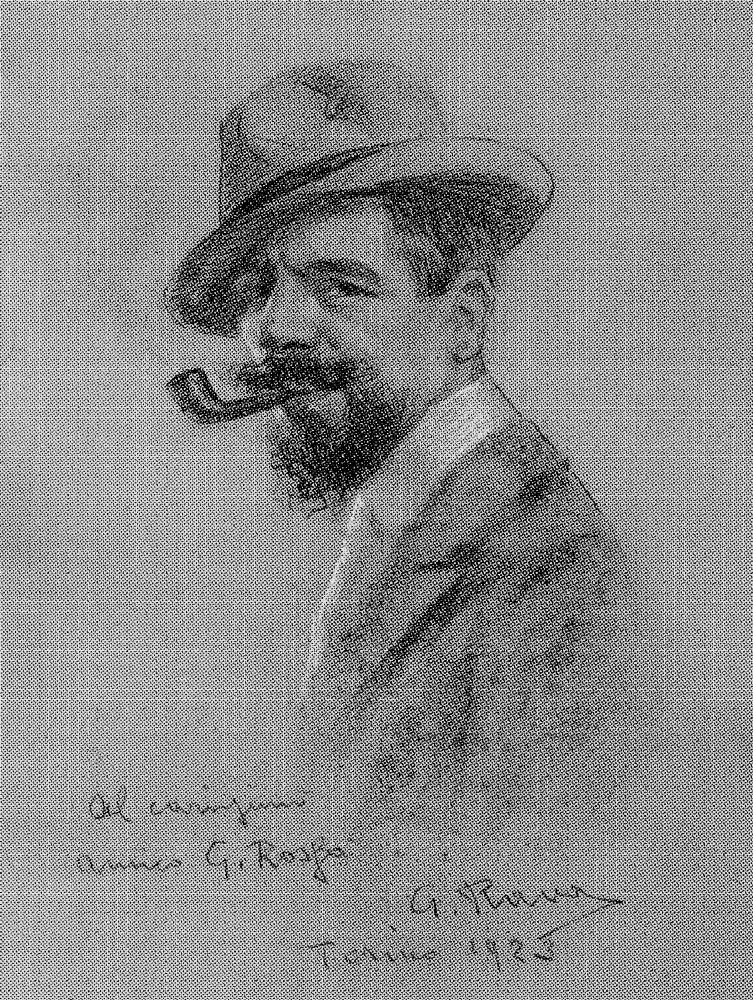
Giovanni Rava, Self-Portrait, 1923.

Giovanni Rava (1874 – 1944) was an Italian painter, active mainly in Turin.

== Biography ==
Rava was born in Magliano Alfieri in the province of Cuneo. He first practiced manuscript illumination, but later turned to painting landscapes under the guidance at the Accademia Albertina at Turin of Giacomo Grosso and Celestino Gilardi.

In 1911–1912, he traveled to Libya, and in 1920–1921 to Latin America. In 1921 he displayed at the Circolo degli Artisti of Turin some paintings on the Vedute of Alba, a type of subject he would continue to address throughout his career.
