= Gianni Gallo =

Italian artist and engraver

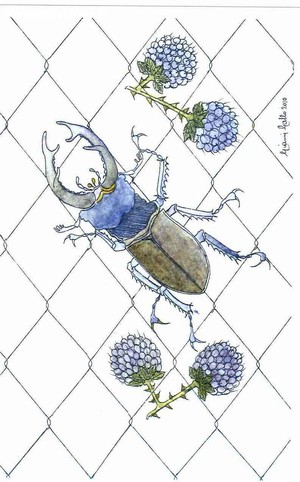
Engraving by Gallo

Gianni Gallo (Dogliani, 1935 – Cuneo, 2011) was an Italian artist and engraver.

Born in Dogliani (1935), a town in the Langhe, in the Northern Italian region of Piedmont, he spent there most of his life and is said to have truly interpreted the original and somehow eccentric spirit of his native land.

His art has been inspired by the Langhe's nature, animals, plants, and rich flavours. Many among his refined and detailed engravings became labels on wine bottles for some of the Langhe's famous wine producers, who also happened to be Gallo's friends . Dogliani and the Langhe are renowned for the production of Barolo, Dolcetto, other well-known wines as well as grappas . Gallo's labels were seminal in that, together with few other artists, he launched the idea of “artistic labels”.

After studying engineering at the Turin Polytechnic, Gallo returned to Dogliani and befriended artists such as Claudio Bonichi and Eso Peluzzi, who were also familiar with that part of Piedmont. However, Gallo refrained from participating in major events and exhibitions and preferred spending his artistic life in the quest for ever newer forms of representing lines and images related to his own land and experience.

Gallo was also interested in football and politics, and dedicated time to cuisine and his family's farm in Dogliani.

Gallo died in 2011 in Cuneo.
