= Sanguinetti =

Sanguinetti is an Italian surname. Notable people with the surname include:

- Alessandra Sanguinetti (born 1968), American photographer
- Carlos Sanguinetti (born 1961), Argentine sailor
- Carmen Sanguinetti (born 1977), Uruguayan politician
- Davide Sanguinetti (born 1972), Italian tennis player
- Evelyn Sanguinetti (born 1970), American politician
- Frank Sanguinetti (1886–1973), Australian football player
- Frederick Sanguinetti (1847–1906), British colonial administrator
- Gianfranco Sanguinetti (1948–2025), Italian writer
- Giorgio Sanguinetti, Italian musicologist
- Giovanni Sanguinetti (born 2000), Italian volleyball player
- Guillermo Sanguinetti (born 1966), Uruguayan football player
- Javier Sanguinetti (born 1971), Argentine football player
- Jorge Sanguinetti (1934–2017), Uruguayan politician
- Julio María Sanguinetti (born 1936), Uruguayan politician, 57th and 59th President of Uruguay
- Leopoldo Sanguinetti, Gibraltarian poet and writer
- Mateo Sanguinetti (born 1992), Uruguayan rugby player
- Natalina Sanguinetti (born 1940), Italian fencer
- Robert "Bobby" Sanguinetti (born 1988), American ice hockey player

== See also ==
- Palazzo Vizzani Lambertini Sanguinetti
- Sanguineti, an Italian surname
