= Giovanni Guarlotti =

Italian painter (1869–1954)

Giovanni Guarlotti (19 November 1869 – 9 May 1954) was an Italian painter, active mainly in Turin.

He was born in Galliate in the province of Novara, to a well-to-do family. He first studied to become an engineer when he enrolled in the Accademia Albertina, where he became a pupil of Demetrio Cosola, Andrea Marchisio, and Pier Celestino Gilardi.

Gilardi helped him exhibit at the Promotrice in Turin in 1894. He painted diverse subjects including portraits, figures, landscapes and animals. He was influenced by the Liberty style and by the pittura a tocchi characteristic of the style of Enrico Reycend. Guarlotti died in Turin.
