= Arcadetar =

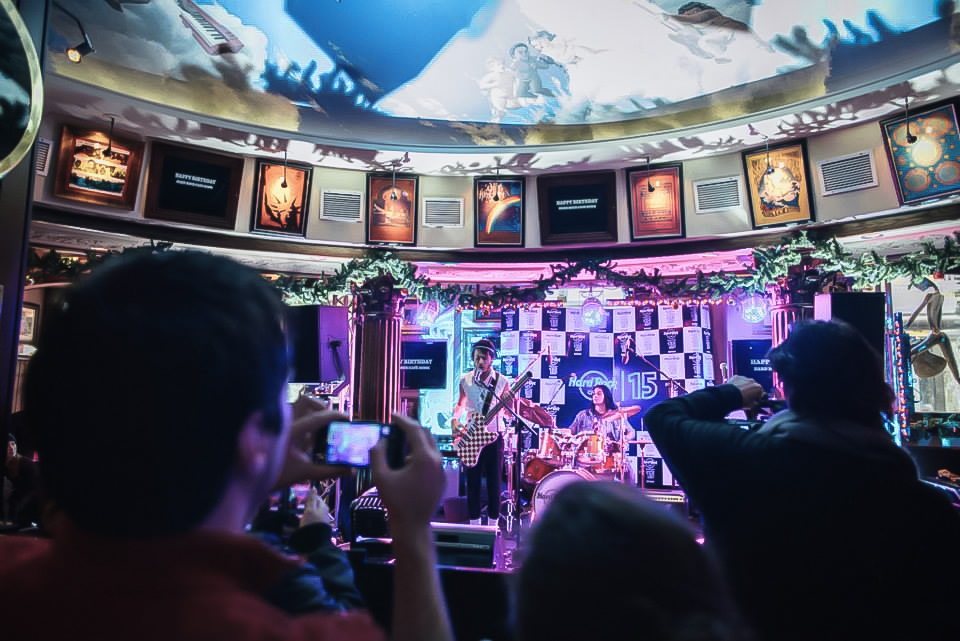
Teapot Industries playing the Arcadetar at Hard Rock Cafe Rome, 10 December 2013

The Arcadetar is a music performance controller, developed in 2012 by the Italian engineer and composer Andrea Lomuscio. It consists of a 25-note keyboard embedded in a guitar body, and a guitar neck with position and pressure sensors.

== Specifications ==
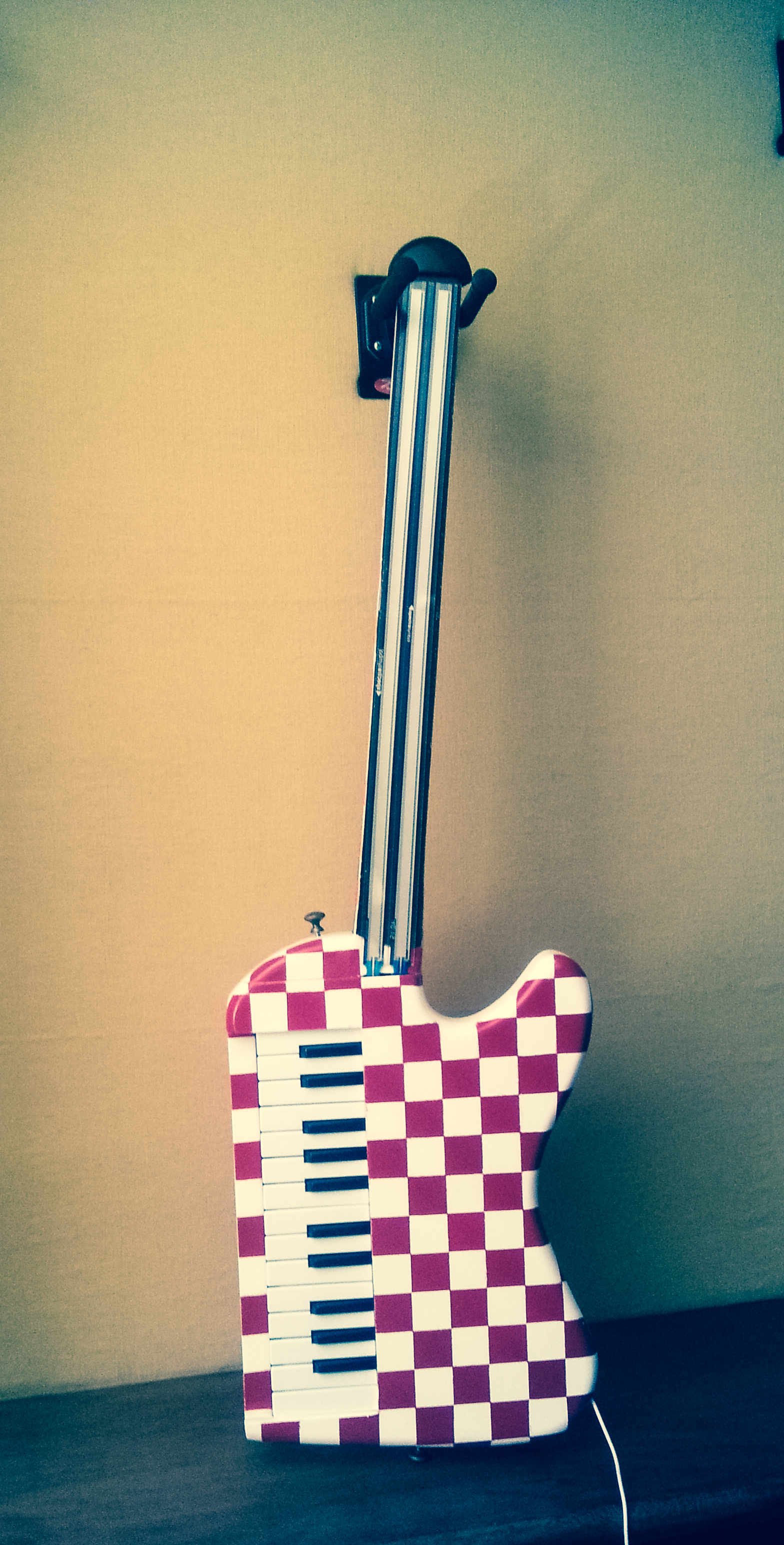
An Arcadetar wood carved by Vittorio Giliberti

The Arcadetar features two 50 centimetres (20 in) touch-sensitive strips that can sense position and pressure. The sensors and the 25-note keyboard are connected to the internal microcontroller enclosed in the guitar body which generates MIDI messages via USB connectivity.

== Playing techniques ==
Frequently the Arcadetar is mistakenly defined as a keytar. The main difference, and peculiarity, is that the Arcadetar lets the performer play contemporaneously a guitar (using the left-hand on the sensors placed on the neck) and a keyboard (using the right-hand on the body). Nevertheless, the performer can also play with the right-hand the keyboard and use the neck to control the pitch-bend and modulation (or even other Control Changes) of the instrument.

The latter technique is more similar to the keytar's one. But, again, the remarkably long sensors (50 cm) allow the performer to modulate the sound in a much more accurate way.
