= Maurizio Pellegrini =

Italian painter and lawyer

Maurizio Pellegrini (1866 – after 1895) was an Italian painter and lawyer.

He was born in Milan. He graduated as a lawyer from the University of Turin in 1889. Then he studied painting at the Accademia Albertina under Professor Giacomo Grosso. He also studied design under the direction of the engraver and professor Alberto Maso Gilli, who later became director of the Real Calcografia Romana. In 1895, he moved to Paris for five years, during which time he frequented the studios of Jules Lefevre and Tony Robert Fleury. Pellegrini painted portraits and genre works in oil, water color, and pastel.

In 1897 at the Paris Salon, he exhibited Loup de mer, Notre Dame de Paris, Place Vendome, Ruit hora, and Idyll. In Turin he exhibited a pastel Testa di vecchio. He exhibited in 1898 at the Promotrice Nazionale of Turin and the Internazionale at Brussels.He also made illustrations for books, catalogs, and journals.

He exhibited often at the Circolo degli Artisti and at the Promotrice of Fine Arts of Turin. Among his works are: Il soldato di Ventura; Portrait of a Lady; Ponte San Martino sid Chisone; Crossano dai colti di Pinerolo and other landscapes.
