= Cesare Ferro Milone =

Italian painter (1880–1934)

- Born: 18 April 1880; Turin, Italy
- Died: 15 March 1934 (aged 53); Turin, Italy
- Other name: Cesare Ferro
- Education: Accademia Albertina
- Known for: landscape and portrait paintings

Cesare Ferro Milone (18 April 1880–15 March 1934), sometimes known only as Cesare Ferro, was an Italian painter born in Turin.

== Biography ==
Cesare was born in Turin to a bourgeois family. He first attended the Technical School of the Collegio of Chivasso. Then during 1894-1899 studied at the Accademia Albertina. He was mentored at the academy by Giacomo Grosso and by Pier Celestino Gilardi.

He exhibited at the 1900 and 1901 Promotrice of Turin. At the 1901 "Feste Estive" exhibition of Livorno he won a gold medal for the painting Preghiera.During this period, he mainly painted landscapes, along with Felice Carena and Filippo Omegna, although he was known also as a portraitist.

That year, he also exhibited at the contest for the Pensionato di Roma, with a Dante e Beatrice. In 1902, he sent a painting to the Italian Art Exposition in St Petersburg. He frequently exhibited at the Biennale of Venice, including 1903, 1905, 1910, 1920, 1922 and 1926. In 1904 a portrait by Cesare won a gold medal at the Paris Salon. With the 1903 Biennale submission of the painting L’attesa at the Biennale of Venice. He begins to distance himself from the influence of Giacomo Grosso in his figures. In 1903, he obtained a position as instructor at the Albertina.

In 1904 he won a gold medal at the Paris Salon, and was invited to travel to Siam to help decorate a royal mansion, arriving a few years before Galileo Chini. The subjects of Cesare's frescoes were derived from local mythology. In 1925, he returned to help decorate Villa Norasingh in Bangkok and complete various portraits.

Returning to Turin 1910, he was nominated to be professor at the Albertina. He remained at the academy, and served as president from 1930 to 1933. He died in a car accident.
