= Teapot Industries =

Italian indie rock band

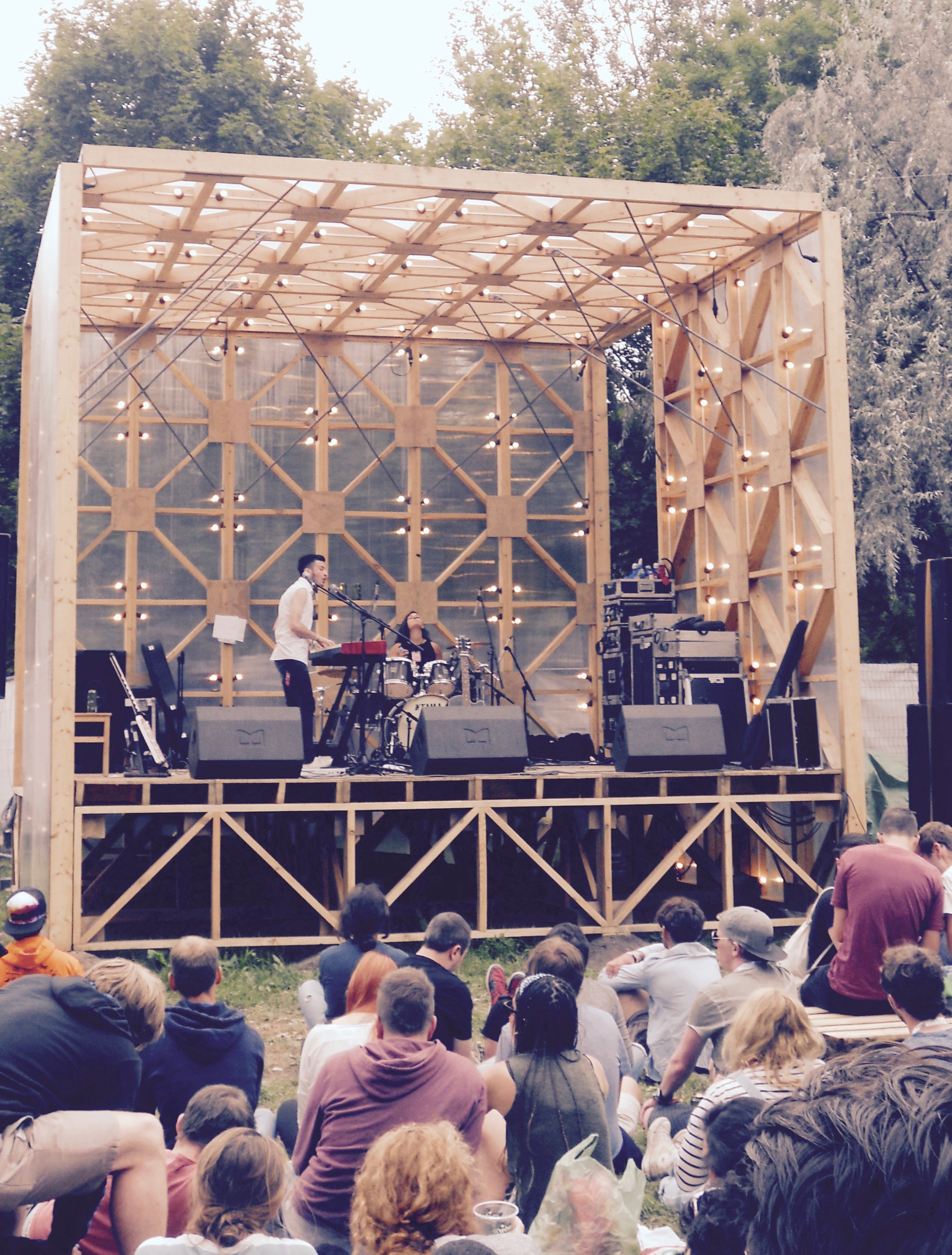
- Teapot Industries in 2016 at Sziget Festival. Left to right: Andrea Lomuscio, Matilde Illiano.

Background information
- Also known as: Teapot Industries Inc.
- Origin: Rome, Italy
- Genres: Experimental, indie pop, experimental rock, indie rock, electronic, art rock, progressive rock, psychedelic rock
- Years active: 2011–present
- Labels: Katana Sounds; Ware-Labs Records; Life Sentence Records
- Members: Andrea Lomuscio; Matilde Illiano
- Website: www.teapot-industries.com

Teapot Industries (also known as Teapot Industries Inc.) is an Italian indie rock band, formed in 2011 in Rome, Italy, by Andrea Lomuscio (Arcadetar, vocals, Theremin, synths) and Matilde Illiano (guitar, drums), known for its unusual custom-built instruments used during live performances.

== History ==
The band name was inspired by Bertrand Russell's never published article titled "Is There a God?", commissioned by Illustrated magazine in 1952:

If I were to suggest that between the Earth and Mars there is a china teapot revolving about the sun in an elliptical orbit, nobody would be able to disprove my assertion provided I were careful to add that the teapot is too small to be revealed even by our most powerful telescopes. But if I were to go on to say that, since my assertion cannot be disproved, it is an intolerable presumption on the part of human reason to doubt it, I should rightly be thought to be talking nonsense. If, however, the existence of such a teapot were affirmed in ancient books, taught as the sacred truth every Sunday, and instilled into the minds of children at school, hesitation to believe in its existence would become a mark of eccentricity and entitle the doubter to the attentions of the psychiatrist in an enlightened age or of the Inquisitor in an earlier time.

— Bertrand Russell

== Band members ==
Official members

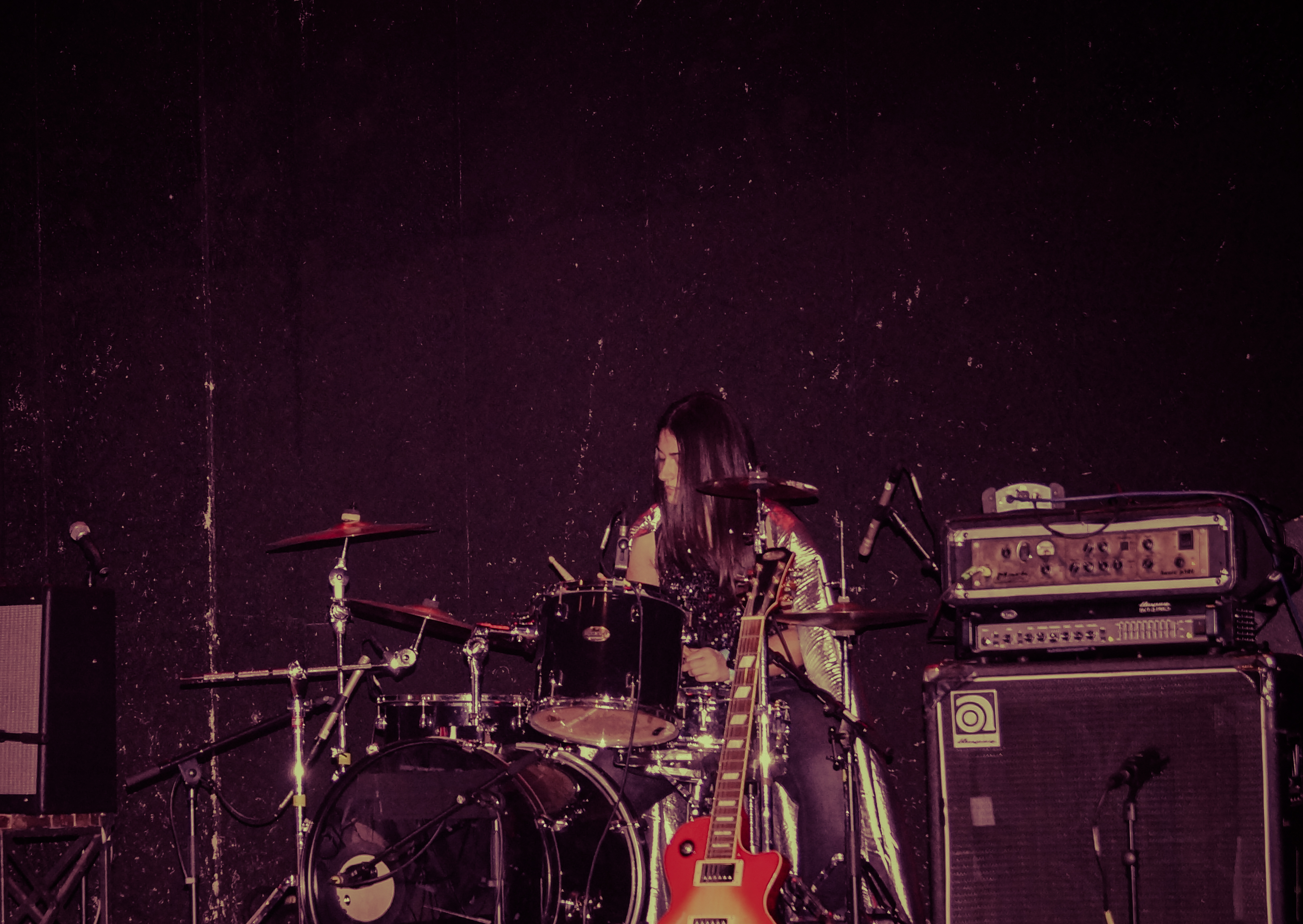
Matilde Illiano playing Drums

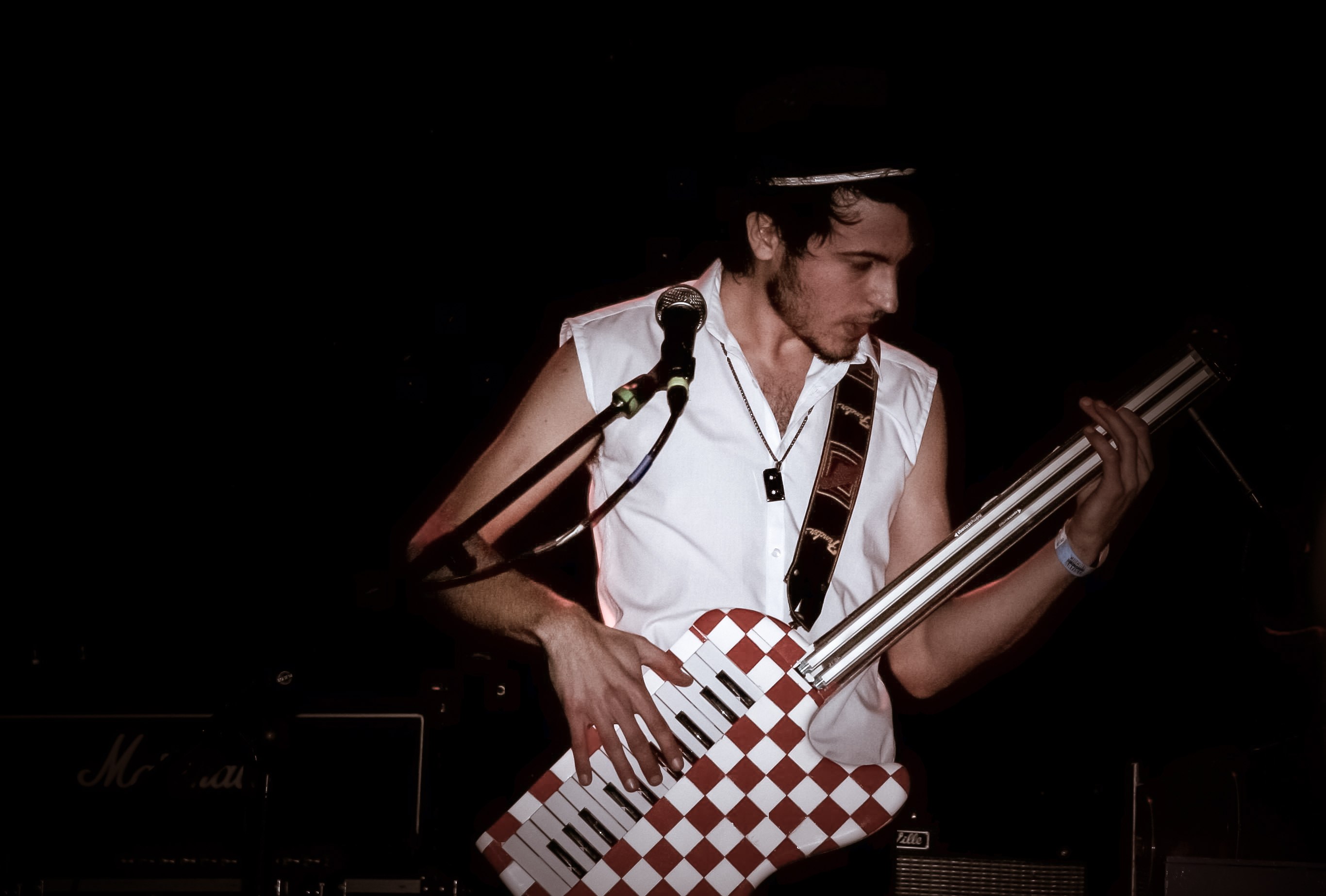
Andrea Lomuscio playing the Arcadetar

- Andrea Lomuscio – vocals, Arcadetar, keyboards, synthesizers, ThereminPi (2011–present)
- Matilde Illiano – drums, percussion, guitars (2012–present)

== Instruments ==
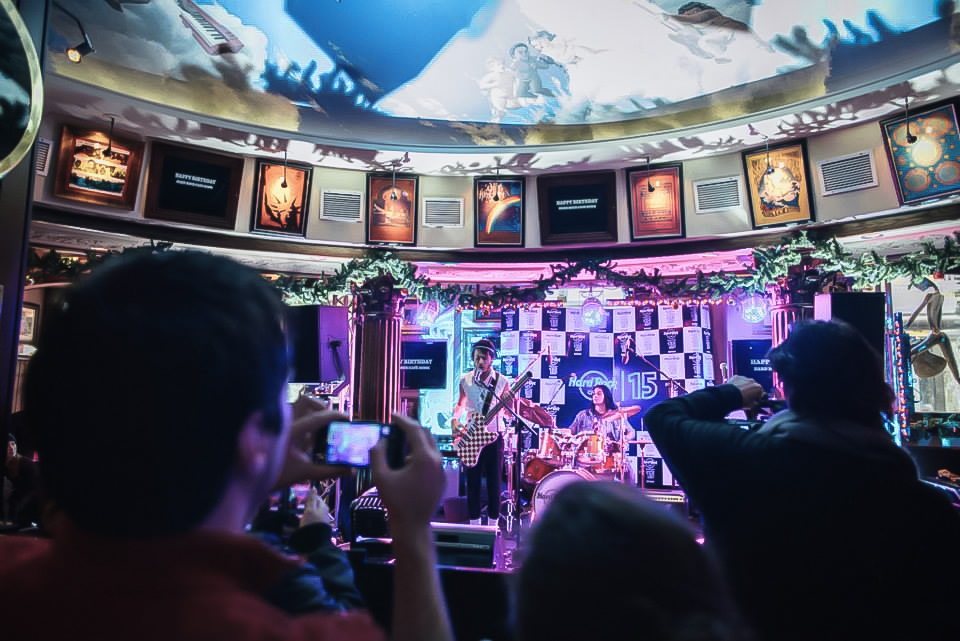
Teapot Industries playing the Arcadetar at Hard Rock Cafe Rome, 10 Dec 2013

During live shows the band uses custom-built instruments, like the Arcadetar and ThereminPi, designed by Teapot Industries themselves and other collaborators. Andrea Lomuscio usually performs using a custom-built purple piano, the Arcadetar, and a pedalboard to trigger chords; being able to play a bass part, a chord pattern, a lead instrument and a vocal part contemporaneously. No pre-recorded sequences are used during live performances.

== Musical style ==
Teapot Industries' sound has been described as a combination of various genres, including a psychedelic version of Jeff Buckley, the prog of Genesis and King Crimson, Pink Floyd, the ballads of Deep Purple, Empire of the Sun's synthpop, and Muse. The main peculiarity is the absence of a verse-chorus structure, with frequent key and tempo changes in the same song. This characteristic is directly taken from the 70's prog-rock, as mentioned before, but Teapot Industries go further corrupting the prog-rock sound with alternative and electronic ones, and always keeping the songs very short. It's not just a chance that Relligion Town contains many musical references, it is a pastiche and a programmatic piece that introduces the listener to Teapot Industries' music.

=== Lyrics ===
The Teapot Industries Corporation is obviously a reference to the authority and dominance of religions. The lyrics frequently deal with the awakening from dogmatic slumber, in particular He, Religion Town and Bertrand. Teapot Industries Inc. proposes itself as a handbook for this awakening.

Vieillesse Time is about a terminally ill man who spent all his money to fulfil his last wish: spending his last days in orbit. This is the first case of euthanasia in space. The American poet and painter Jonathan Clark realized a triptych based on Viellesse Time, interpreting the song as the end of the pain as a consequence of an ethereal vision. He exposed this work in a local hospital in Kentucky, USA as a form of Art-Therapy.

At the moment Teapot Industries have not released an official explanation of Bag and Baggage lyrics, so different interpretations are plausible.

Like to Be Alone, Pt.2 is about multiverse travels. If we could travel enough far, about $10^{{10}^{118}}$ meters away, we could discover an entire universe identical to ours. In particular Like to Be Alone, Pt.2 is about having sex with your doppelgänger.

The triptych based on the emotive quality of Viellesse Time realised by Jonathan Clark in 2012.

== Use in media ==
- Vieillesse Time has been used for an alternative version of the 6th season trailer of the TV series Skins.
- Like to Be Alone, Pt. 2 and Vieillesse Time (Live) are part of the OST of Odyssey: On the Lands of Sam Neill directed by Matthieu Blomme in 2015
- Carphology is included in the short movie Afterparty by Kieran Wall, while Vieillesse Time has been used for its trailer in 2016

== Discography ==
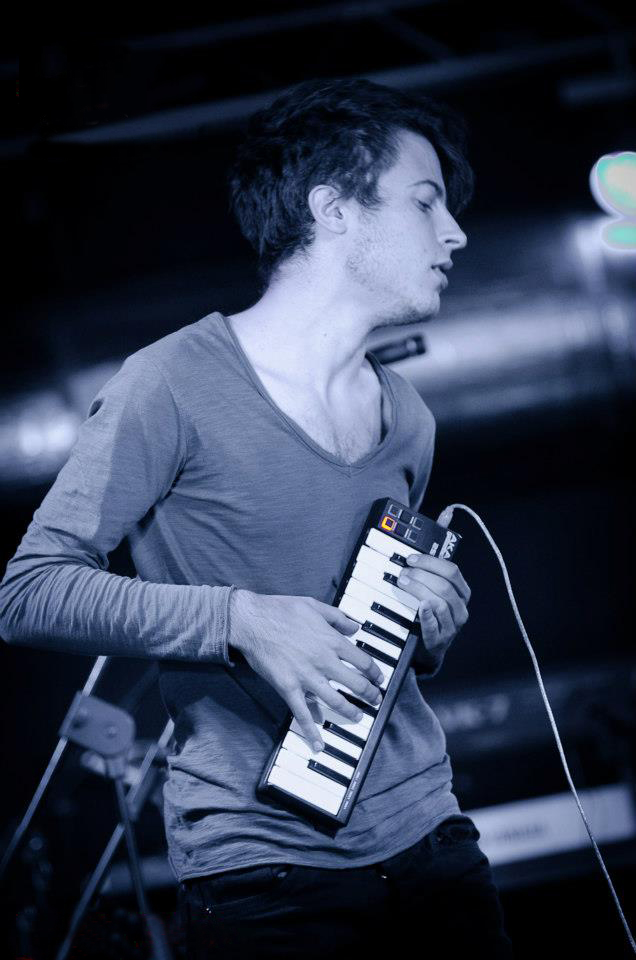
Teapot Industries playing as opening act for Sonja Kristina and Oak

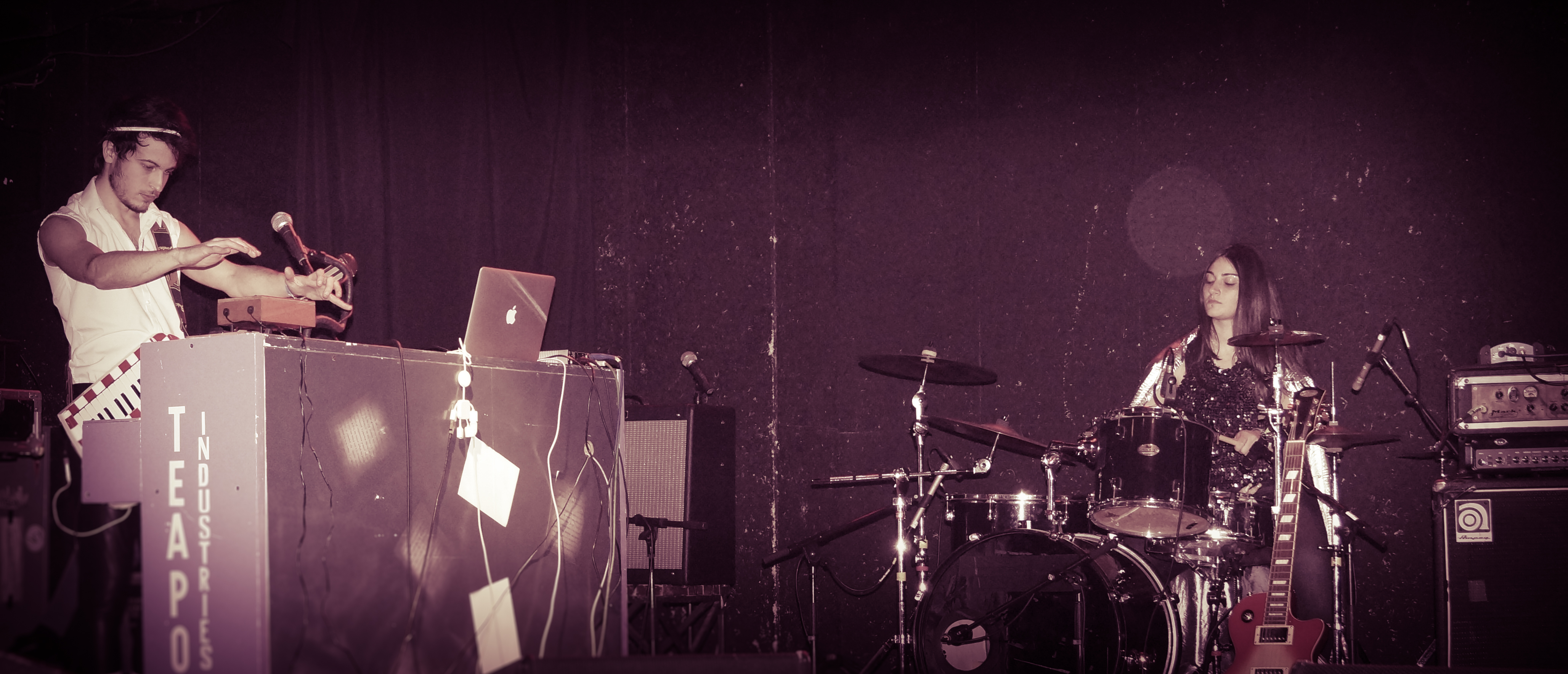
Teapot Industries live at Circolo degli Artisti in 2014

=== Albums ===
- 2017: Teapot Industries Inc. (TripWire Records)
1. Bertrand (Introduction) – 2:16
2. Bertrand (Album Version) – 3:07
3. Carphology (Album Version) – 5:27
4. Like To Be Alone, Pt.2 – 3:35
5. Vieillesse Time – 3:55
6. Rob The Cradle – 3:47
7. Bag and Baggage – 3:39
8. Vieillesse Time (Live) – 6:48

=== EPs ===
- 2014: Teapot Industries Goes Live (Ware-Labs / AWAL)
1. Like to Be Alone, Pt. 2 – 3:33
2. Introduction – 0:58
3. Rob the Cradle (Live) – 4:15
4. He (Live) – 4:03
5. Jesus' Money (Live) – 4:36
6. Vieillesse Time (Live) – 6:48
- 2011: Teapot Industries Inc. (2011 - Demo) (Ware-Labs / AWAL)
1. He (Demo) – 2:43
2. Rob the Cradle (Demo) – 3:17
3. Religion Town (Demo) – 4:39
4. Vieillesse Time (Demo) – 3:56
5. Bag and Baggage (Demo) – 2:48

=== Singles ===
- 2014: Vanessa Laino ft. Teapot Industries – Dioniso (Life Sentence Rec.)
- 2015: Teapot Industries – Bertrand (remixes) (Katana Sounds)
- 2016: Carphology (Katana Sounds) – Artwork by Mark Kostabi

=== Videos ===
- 2015: Bertrand (Paki Palmieri Main Mix) – directed by Juan Behrens
- 2016: Carphology feat. Matthew Rubinstein – directed by Teapot Industries in collaboration with Mark Kostabi
- 2016: Bertrand (Album Version) – directed by Matthieu Blomme
