= Supreme Meeting =

Painting by Giacomo Grosso shown in the 1895 Venice Biennale

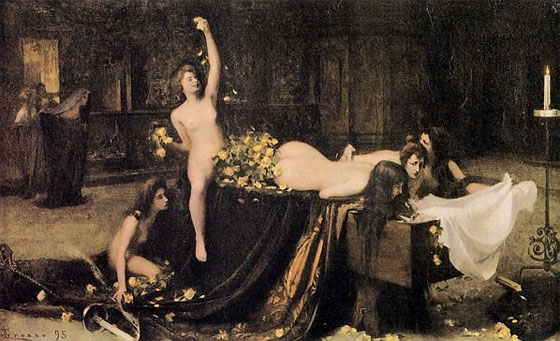
- Artist: Giacomo Grosso

Supreme Meeting (Italian: Il supremo convegno) was a painting by Giacomo Grosso known for its controversial showing at the first Venice Biennale in 1895. The painting depicted several nude women lounging near an open casket. Between its subject matter and color palette, religious leaders attempted to have the work removed. It was instead put in its own room, where it drew crowds and ultimately received the exhibition's best in show prize by popular vote. Upon the Biennale's end, the work was lost in a fire en route to the United States.
