= Promotrice delle Belle Arti =

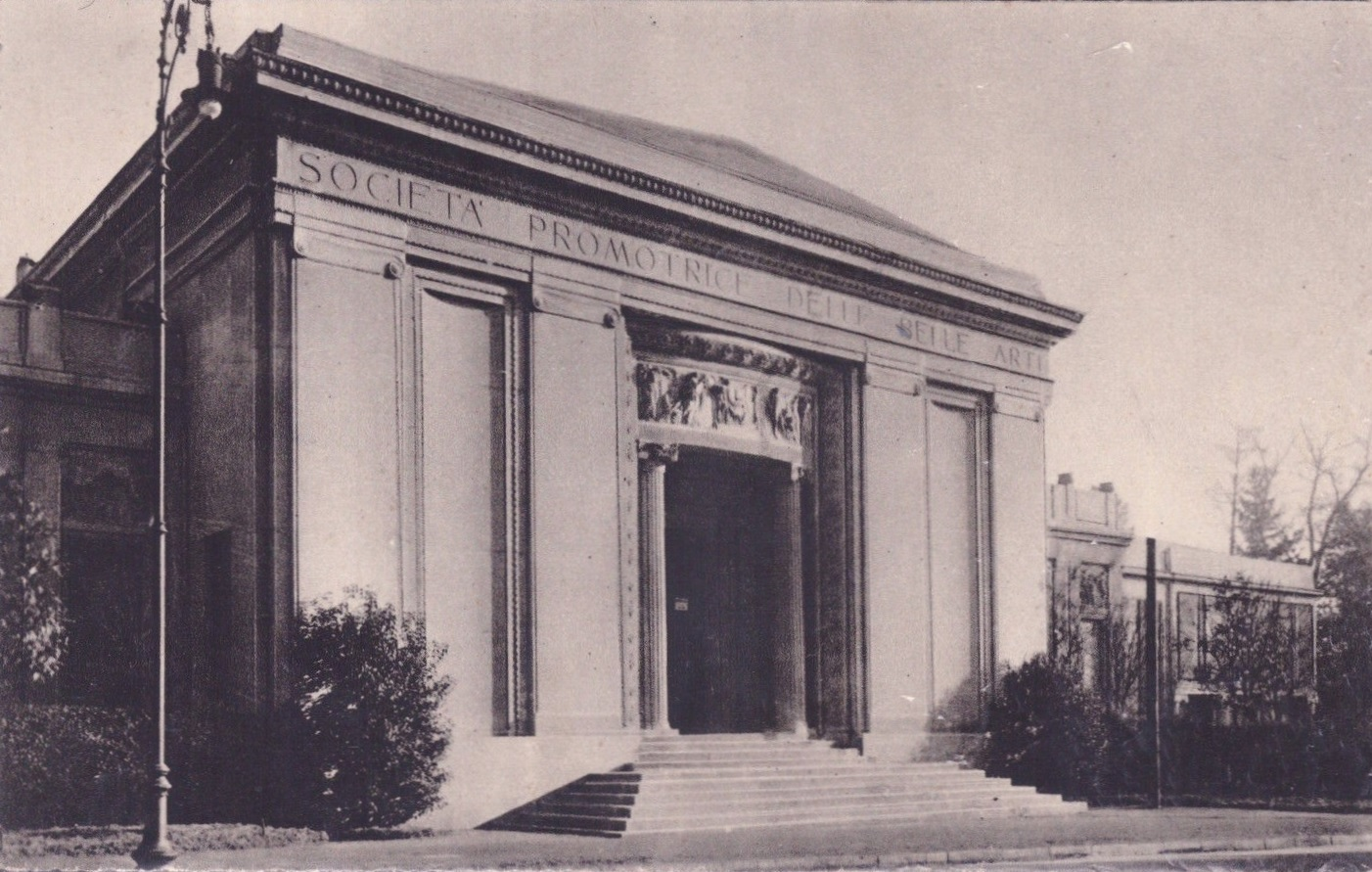
- Promotrice delle Belle Arti in 1880.
- Established: 1842
- Location: Turin, Italy
- Coordinates: 45°03′12″N 7°41′07″E
- Website: www.promotricebellearti.org

The Promotrice delle Belle Arti is an art gallery located in Turin, Italy.

== History ==
The Promotrice delle Belle Arti was founded in 1842 and was held at different locations in Turin, including the palace of Carlo Ceppi, the Piazza d'Armi, and the Albertina Academy. Its first exhibit was set up in the house of Marquis Doria di Ciriè in 1842.

The gallery moved to the exhibition pavilion in Via Crivelli, located in Parco del Valentino in 1914. Land adjacent to the Castello del Valentino was purchased and in 1919 a building was built for the exhibits. Designed by Enrico Bonicelli, the building included sculptures by Davide Calandra with exeterior work by Giulio Casanova and Edoardo Rubino. The building was englarged by Giovanni Chevalley during the 1930s and 1940s, including the addition of pavilions.

The building was partially destroyed in bombings during World War II, including air raids in both 1942 and 1943. Damage included detachment of the roof and collapse of some ceilings and walls. The exhibit received (L.)100,000 in 1945 to rebuild the damage.

== Select exhibitions ==
Italian painter Domenico Buratti made his debut at Promotrice delle Belle Arti in 1903, as did his wife Vittoria Cocito with her exhibition in 1911. Italian painter Giacomo Balla also first exhibited his art there.

Artwork of Edgar Degas from his Musée d'Orsay collection were exhibited at the Belle Arti from October 2012 to January 27, 2013. The First Mona Lisa, an exhibit featuring the Isleworth Mona Lisa, was held at the gallery from later 2023 through May 26, 2024.
