= Alejandro Marmo =

Argentine artist

Alejandro Marmo is an Argentine artist born in the district of Tres de Febrero, Buenos Aires Province, Argentina. He is the author of "Art in the Factory", with art that led to productive work spaces.

He is the author of the idea of installing two figures of Evita in the north and south facades of former Public Works building actual building of the Ministry of Health and Social Development at the intersection of 9 de Julio Avenue and Belgrano Avenue. Two figures of steel, 31x24 meters, totaling 14 tons. The south face was inaugurated by President Cristina Fernández de Kirchner, commemorating the 59th anniversary of the death of Eva Perón.

== Biographical ==
He was born on February 19, 1971, in a family of immigrants made up her Italian father and Greek mother, a descendant of Armenians. In his early years in the smithy of his father was growing taste for art and continuously develop a self-taught from age 20.

== Concept ==
Alejandro Marmo installed the concept of integration through art as a metaphor of cultural and industrial development. For this, it works with workers and excluded sectors of society.

In the mid-90 created the "Art in the Factory" with the intention of rescuing the industrial backwardness abandoned factories of Buenos Aires. With these materials and with the collaboration of workers dismissed from the production system led to the creation and placement of artworks in public spaces.

Evita's murals are the ultimate expression of this project, realized with the industry as emblematic of what is weathering steel and constructed with the participation of workers. Throughout his career, he worked with residents of Villa 31 and the Ejército de los Andes Fuerte Apache area, with low-income children in the Chaco Province and the Tigre district, among other places.

Internationally, consider art as a universal language capable of building bridges between different cultures, ran scenarios in Latin America, Europe and Asia. Workers worked with the Dominican Republic with illegal Romanian immigrants in Italy and Tokyo centenarians.

He is currently undertaking an integration project in the shantytowns of the Cañada Real de Madrid (Spain). There he worked with Rome (Italy) in the construction of a piece to be located in that community. He also worked on building a theme park in Vienna (Austria) insects

The works resulting from these experiences are deployed in public spaces, precisely because the artist is where they take full extent, while the creators and reinforce the sense of belonging to the artistic work.

This understanding and develop the art aims to evaluate the imaginary world of the common man. This means that those involved in the project believe in themselves to see that what is projected from the imagination can be realized.

The transformation of what beauty is negligible in another concept that governs the work of Alejandro Marmo. The artist has a successful production of sculptures and paintings from waste, industrial backwardness or scrap.

Such is the case of the "Bee of Río Tercero" built in 2001 by Marmo with debris from the explosion of military factory in 1995 in collaboration with students in the career of Fine Arts.

== Art in the Factory ==
The project "Art in the Factory" aims to articulate the most diverse workspaces, through art. To do so, produce works for public spaces in factories, self-managed and private sources with the participation of workers, professional workers and people with integration difficulties. The project set out to express the language of the excluded during the crisis of industrial recession and leave in the public testimony of that event.

Some of the most relevant artist in the framework of this project are:

- "Evita in the 9 July." Two steel wall cut applied on the facades of the Ministry of Social Development. 9 de Julio Avenue between Moreno and Independence.
- "Siren of the Rio de la Plata", located on the corner of 9 de Julio Avenue and Posadas, in the neighborhood of Recoleta.
- "The Metallurgical Workers", located on the corner of 9 de Julio Avenue and Posadas, in the neighborhood of Recoleta.
- "Galaxy Industrial", located in the district of San Martin, Buenos Aires Province.
- "Monument to Labour", located in the Civic Center Square neighborhood Ejército de los Andes, Fuerte Apache.
- "Ray King", located in the Dominican Republic.
- "Landing on the Supply", installed at the entrance of Ciudad Cultural Konex, in the neighborhood of Abasto, Buenos Aires City.
- "Sun Child," based in the city of Miramar (Buenos Aires).
- Sculpture Park in Rome, in the parks of Circolo Degli Artisti.
- Wall of Hugs Healers in the JICA headquarters. Tokyo. Japan
- Theme Park WUK insects. Vienna. Austria
- "Bee of Río Tercero", located in Rio Tercero. Córdoba Province, Argentina
- Cristo Obrero (Jesus Christ as a Worker), 2014, Vatican City, Gardens of Vatican City
- Nuestra Senora de Luhán (Our Lady of Luhán), 2014, Vatican City, Gardens of Vatican City
- "Christ Workers Workers", located in the parish of Cristo Obrero and San Blas neighborhood of Villa Soldati. Buenos Aires Cityy
- El Abrazo (The Hug), 2022, Università degli Studi di Teramo, Italy
