= Circolo degli Artisti =

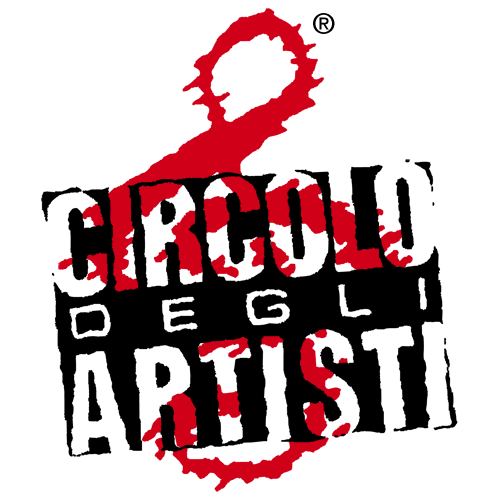
- Interactive map of Circolo degli Artisti
- Address: Via Casilina Vecchia, 42; Roma; Italy
- Coordinates: 41.887349°N 12.523777°E
- Owner: Thomas Balsamini
- Event: Alternative rock

Construction
- Opened: 1989
- Closed: 2015

Website
- http://www.circoloartisti.it/

The Velvet Club was founded in 1989 by Romano Cruciani and Gianluca Celidonius, after the closing of the theater "La Scaletta", because of the eviction suffered by the headquarters in Via del Collegio Romano, after 10 years in business. The first club's headquarters were at the abandoned buildings of the old Centrale del Latte of Rome, in Via Lamarmora 28, behind Piazza Vittorio Emanuele II, in the rione Esquilino.

In 1998, the Circolo degli Artisti, had to find a new venue due to the renovation of the premises of the "old" Centrale had to make way for the new covered market in Piazza Vittorio. It moved in the current space of Via Casilina Vecchia 42, where stood premises that in post-World War II had served as laundry and that at that time housed one "junkyard", typical activities of deposit/landfill and reuse of parts of vehicles engine and machinery in general, often present and hidden in the periphery or in marginal areas of the capital.

The covered premises of the Circolo degli Artisti are composed of two rooms (one set up for concerts, disco and exhibitions, and only for exhibitions and dance hall), a corner shop with the box office, and a pizzeria open all year long. Outside there is a large garden, where a permanent art exhibition of Argentine sculptor Alejandro Marmo is set up since 2005.

== Theater school ==
The Theatre "La Scaletta", after closing, continued to live as a theater school at the Circolo degli Artisti. It organizes acting classes and workshops for arts and runs periodically small performances and stand-up comedies. Founded in 1981 by Romano Cruciani, Michele Mario Jorio, and Giovanbattista Diotaiuti "La Scaletta" has been used over the years by prestigious teachers: Gianni Diotaiuti, Antonio Pierfederici, Franco However, Ivano de Matteo, John Antonucci, Pino Manzari, Giuseppe Argirò, Giuseppe Marini, Valeria Campo, Marco Maltauro, Sabrina and Sabrina Dodaro Jorio, to name a few. Many actors trained at "La Scaletta": Alessandro Haber, Kim Rossi Stuart, Massimo Bonetti, Stefano Dionisi, Pino Quartullo, Marco Giallini, Edoardo Leo, Fabiola Auger, Riccardo Polizzy Carbonelli, Marco Bocci, Tiziana Foschi, Dominic Fortunato, Arianna Dell'Arti.

== Some past concerts ==
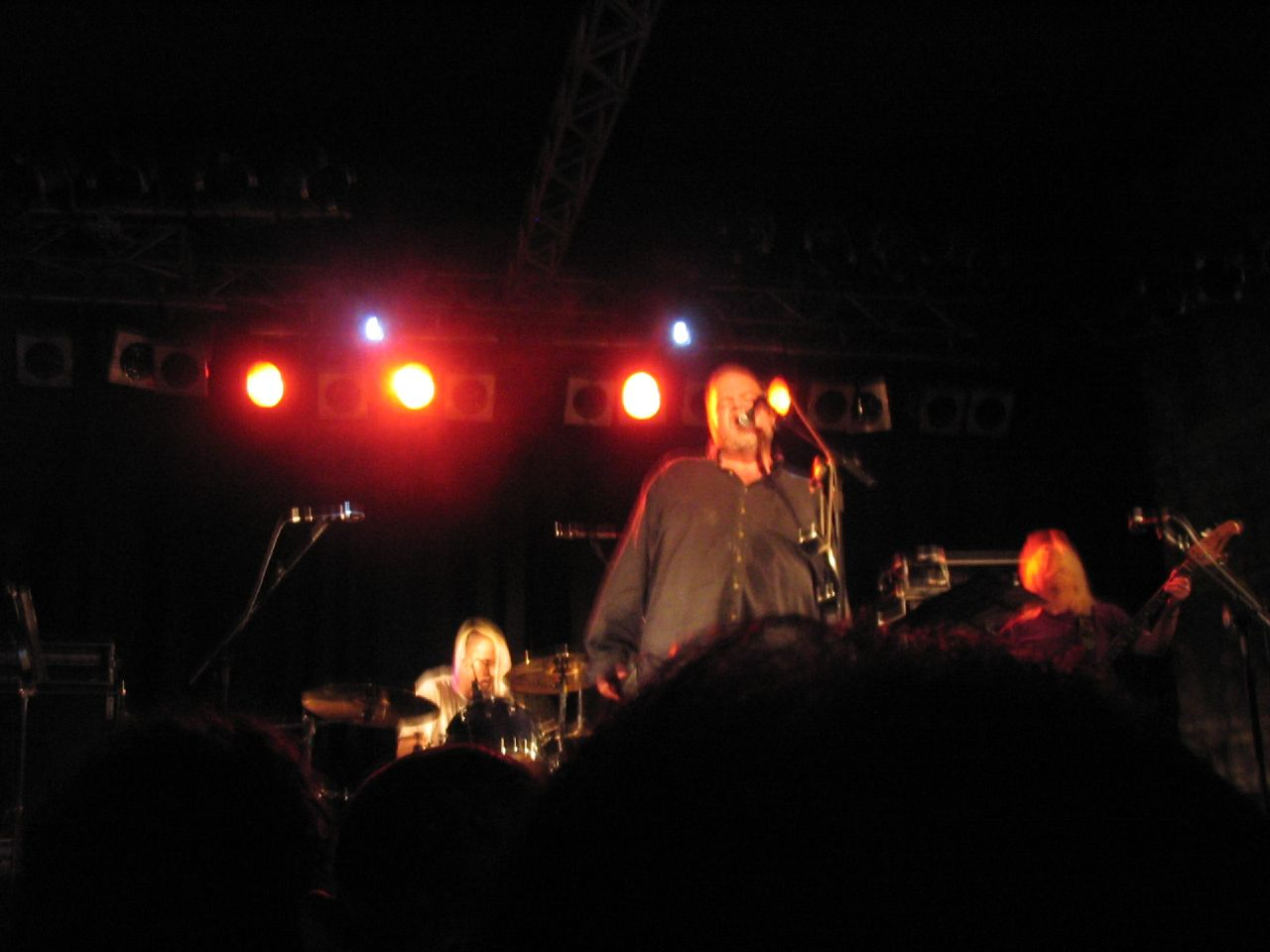
Pere Ubu live in 2007.

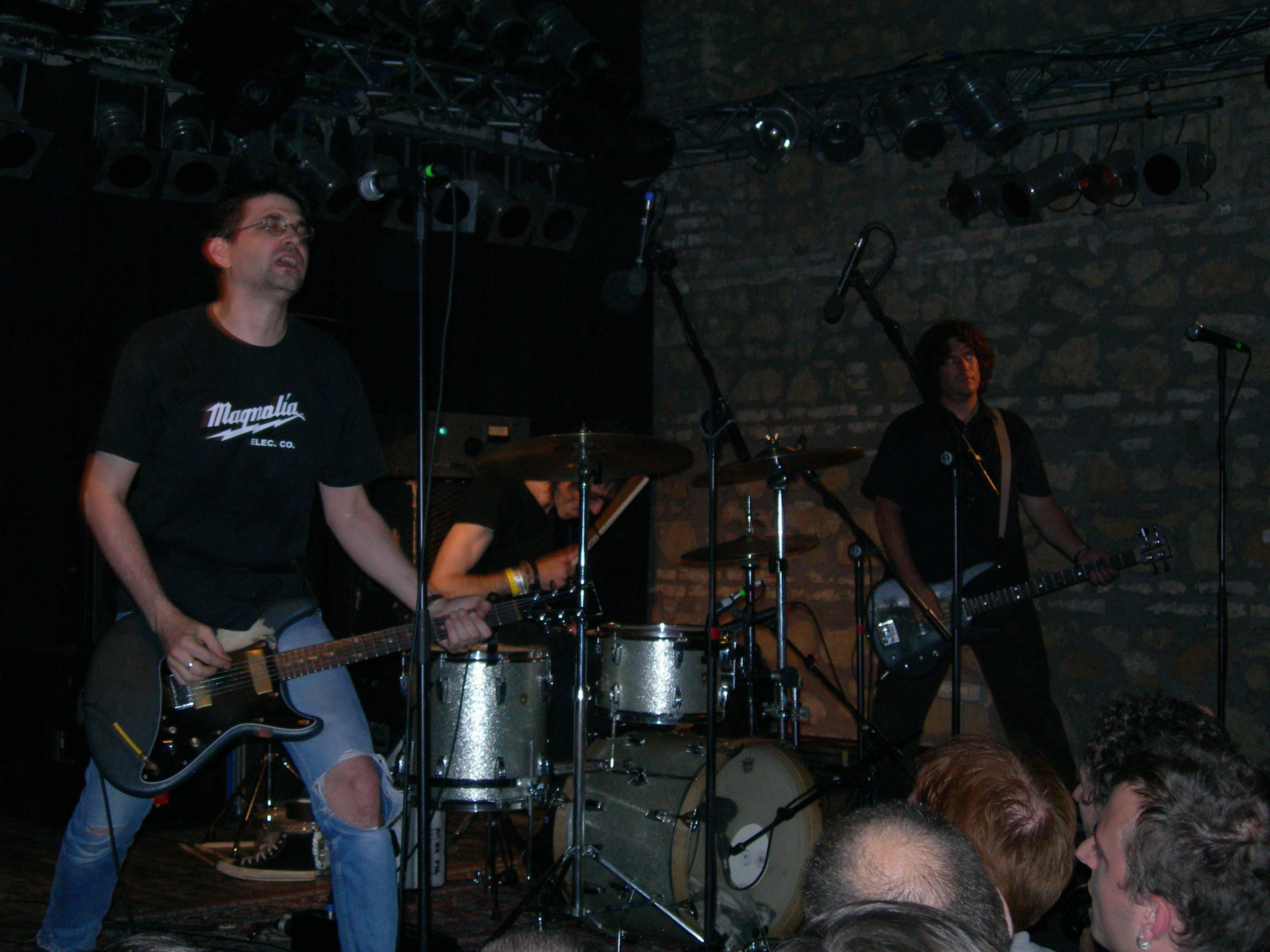
Shellac live in 2007.

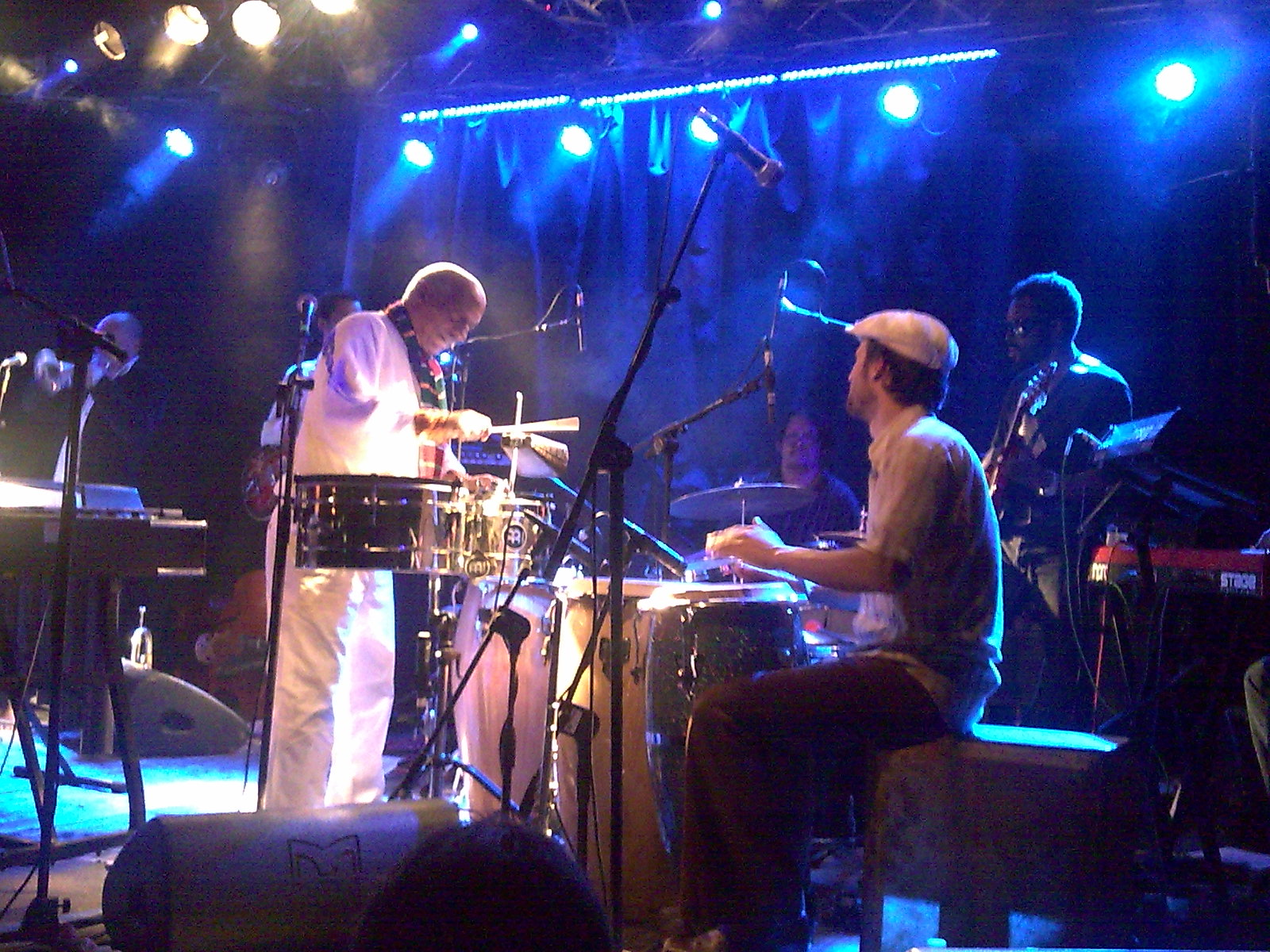
Mulatu Astatke live in 2009.

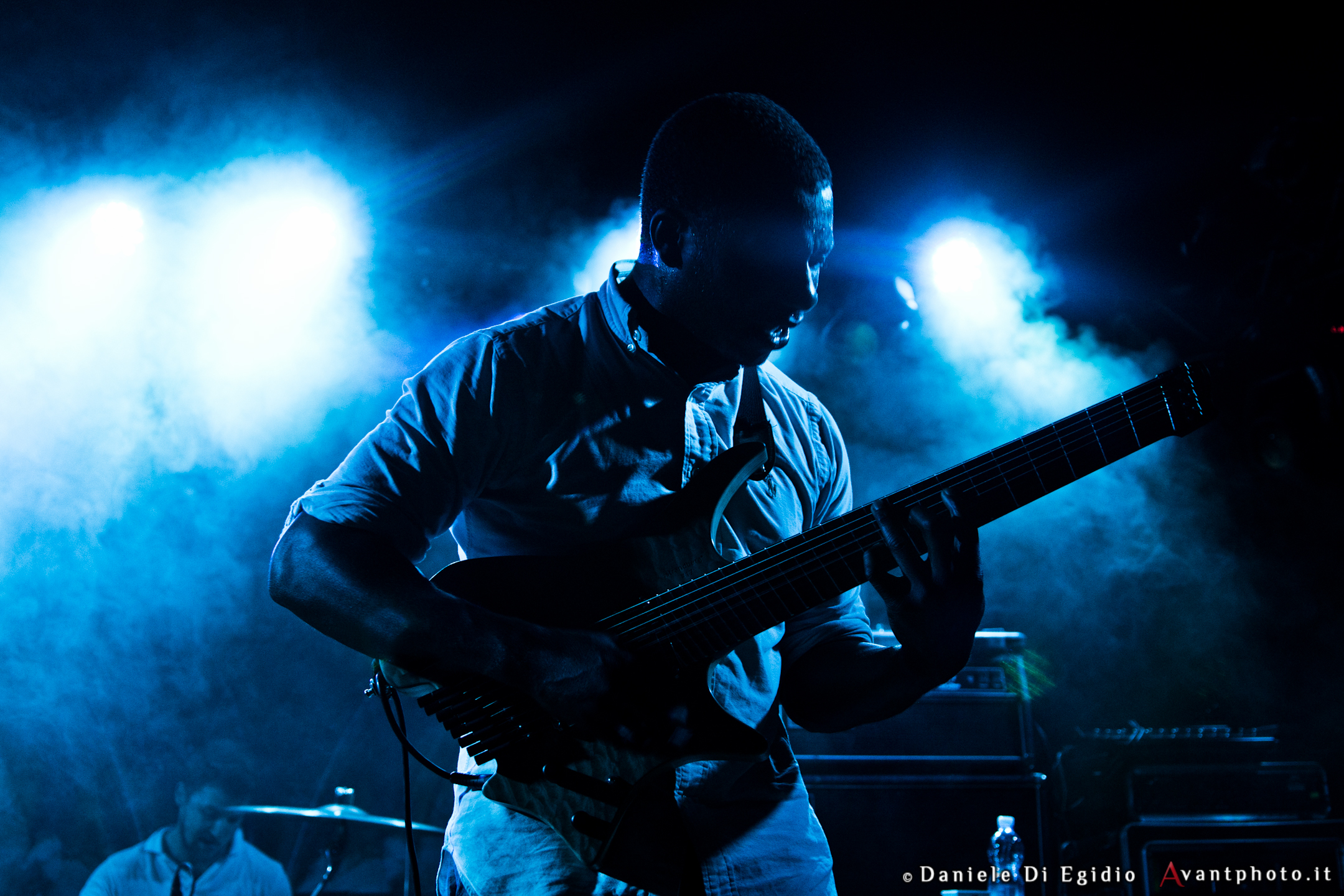
Tosin Abasi with Animals as Leaders live in 2011.

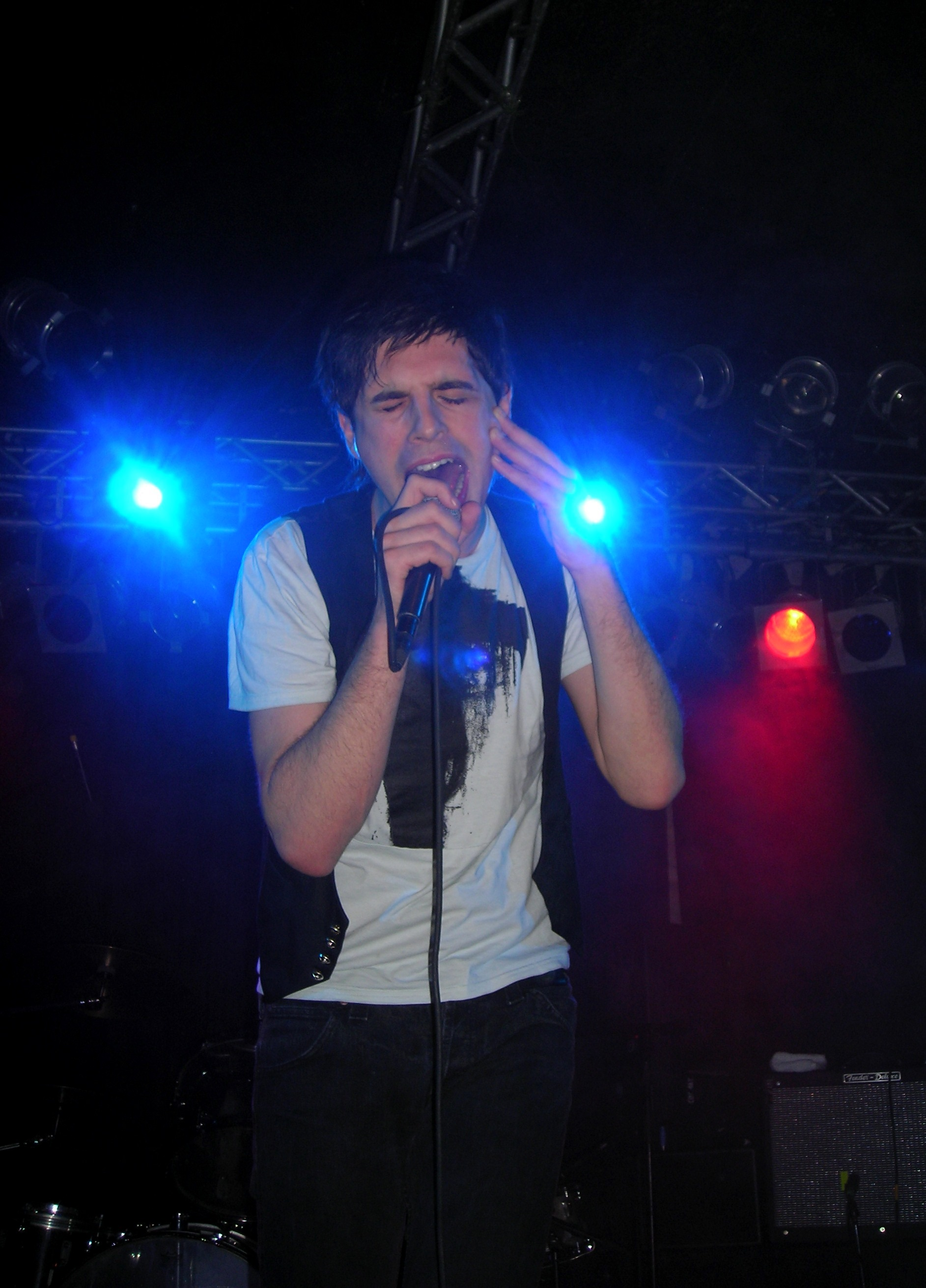
Dan Black with The Servant live in 2007.

- Afrika Bambaataa
- Afterhours
- Alt-J
- Animals as Leaders
- Apparat
- Architecture in Helsinki
- Baustelle
- Beck
- Billy Bragg
- Bonnie 'Prince' Billy
- Bush
- Digitalism
- Dinosaur Jr.
- Easy Star All-Stars
- Fishbone
- Frankie hi-nrg mc
- Fuck Buttons
- Jesus Lizard
- Kaiser Chiefs
- Living Colour
- Ludovico Einaudi
- Mark Lanegan
- Marlene Kuntz
- Melvins
- Mike Patton
- Modeselektor
- Morgan
- Motorpsycho
- Napalm Death
- Notwist
- Nouvelle Vague
- Pere Ubu
- Piotta
- Shellac
- Skiantos
- Skin
- Steve Earle
- Teapot Industries
- Telefon Tel Aviv
- The Black Angels
- The Horrors
- The Residents
- The Servant
- The Sonics
- Tortoise
- Two Door Cinema Club
- Verdena
- Zen Circus
