= Pier Celestino Gilardi =

Italian painter and sculptor

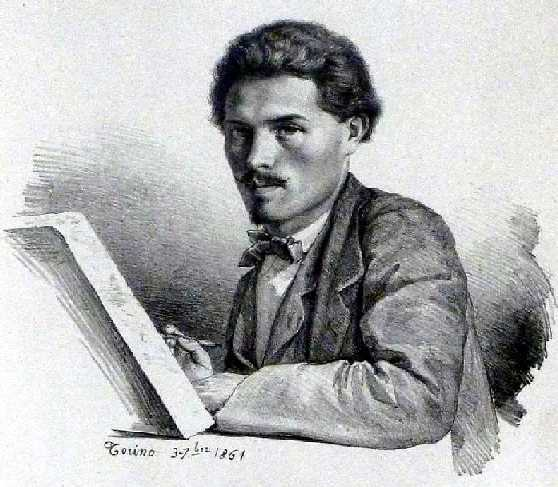
- Self portrait, 1861
- Born: 16 September 1837; Campertogno, Kingdom of Sardinia-Piedmont
- Died: 4 October 1905 (aged 68); Borgosesia, Italy

For the Italian artist born in 1942, see Piero Gilardi.

Pier Celestino Gilardi (16 September 1837 – 4 October 1905) was an Italian painter and sculptor.

== Early life and education ==
Born in Campertogno, the son of a sculptor, Gilardi studied at the Technical School of carving in Varallo and then, thanks to a scholarship of the Collegio Caccia of Novara, he enrolled at the Accademia Albertina in Turin, studying painting under Andrea Gastaldi. He held his first exhibitions in 1862.

== Career ==
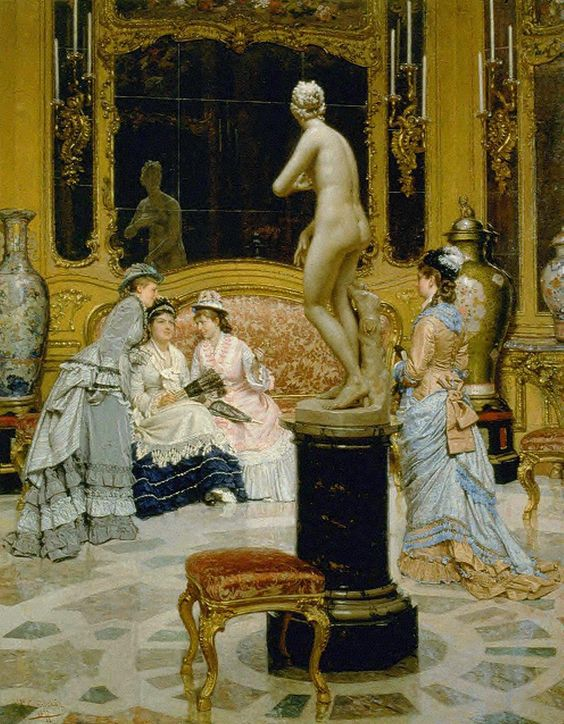
A Visit to the Gallery, 1877, oil on canvas, University of Michigan Museum of Art. The scene is thought to depict the Uffizi Gallery in Florence.

Between 1873 and 1884 Gilardi was assistant of Gastaldi at the Accademia Albertina, and in 1884 was promoted to the role of professor of drawing. In 1889 he succeeded to Gastaldi as professor of painting.

Initially interested in historical subjects, starting from the second half of the 1860s Gilardi eventually specialized in genre painting, and from the middle of the 1870s focused in often humorous depictions of elderly subjects and of church everyday life. Especially popular was his painting Hodie mihi cras tibi (1884), now in the Modern Art Gallery of Turin.

Among his pupils were Giovanni Guarlotti and Giovanni Rava.

== Notable work ==
One of Gilardi's notable paintings is the 1877 piece A Visit to the Gallery, which the University of Michigan Museum of Art acquired in 1895. The painting depicts a group of young women looking at a nude classical female statue, possibly the Venus de Medici at the Uffizi Gallery in Florence. Molly Peacock's poem "Girl and Friends View Naked Goddess" is directly inspired by this painting.
