= Leopoldo Sanguinetti =

Leopoldo Sanguinetti was a Gibraltarian poet and writer. He wrote in English and was the author of the sonnet sequence the Calpean Sonnets (1957). In the 2004 Encyclopedia of Post-Colonial Literatures in English (edited by Eugene Benson and L.W. Conolly) Sanguinetti's Calpean Sonnets was described as one of "the only two English-language volumes of Gibraltarian poetry of significance." Sanguinetti also wrote lyrics for the Gibraltarian composer Pepe Noguera.
