= Paolo Gaidano =

Italian painter

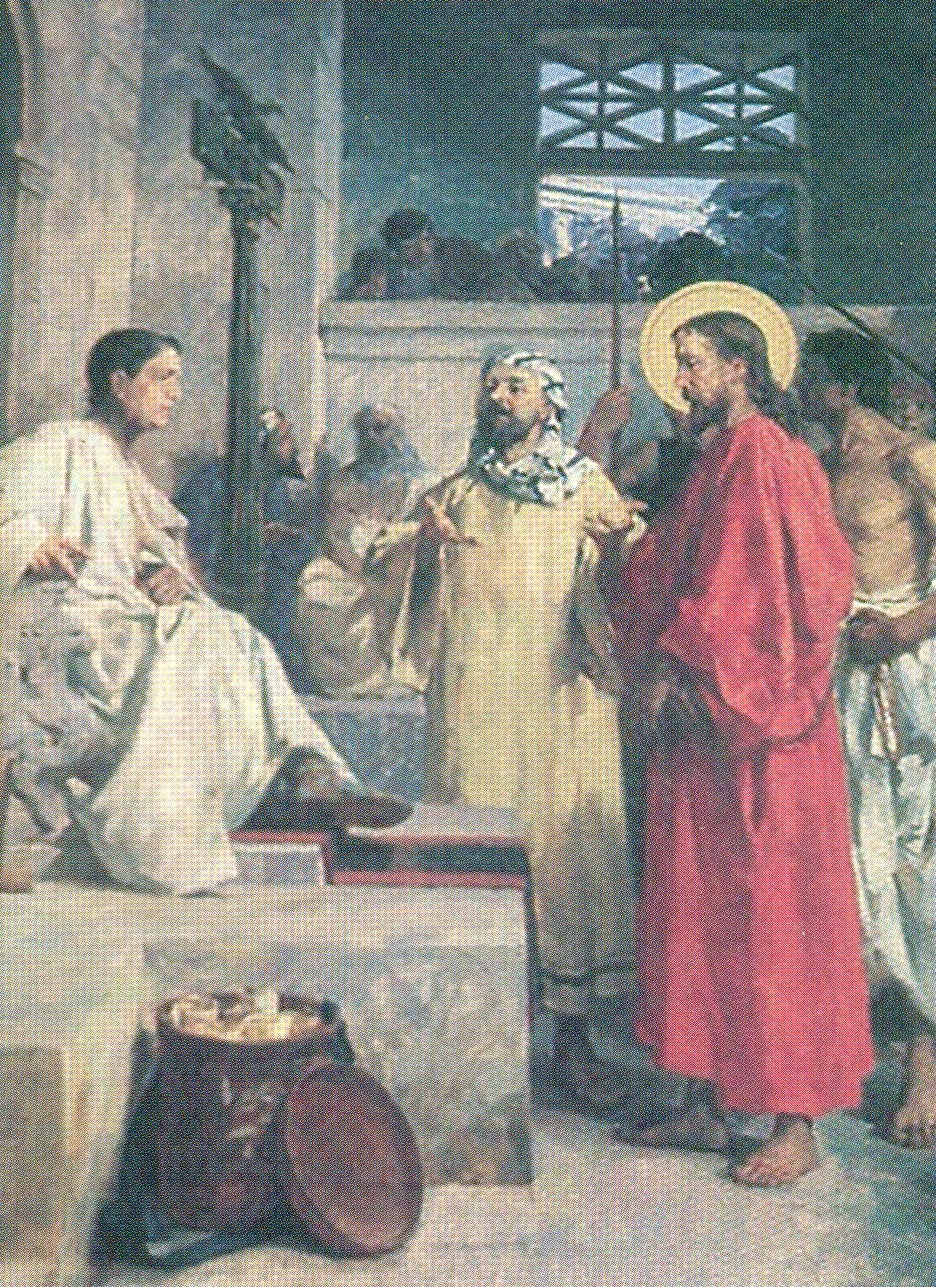
Christ is Condemned to Death, Church of St. Maria Assunta, Fubine

Paolo Gaidano (1861–1916) was an Italian painter, born in Poirino, in the region of the Piedmont.

From 1875 to 1878 he studied at the Accademia Albertina in Turin. He decorated the Cathedral of Carignano, and several churches in Turin.

In 1884, he exhibited Deluso, Ritratto d'uomo, and Ritratto di bambina. In 1887, he exhibited Tantum ergo.

Among his pupils were Eso Pelluzi and Italo Mus.
