= Eso Peluzzi =

Italian painter (1894–1985)

Eso Peluzzi (Cairo Montenotte, 6 January 1894 - Monchiero, 17 May 1985) was an Italian pointillist painter. He was the uncle of contemporary painter Claudius Bonichi.

== Biography ==
Eso Peluzzi was born in Cairo Montenotte. His father was a prominent luthier and his mother a photographer. He studied at the Accademia Albertina in Turin, and was a pupil of Paolo Gaidano and Giacomo Grosso. In 1919 he moved to the neighborhood of the Santuario di Savona.

In 1922 had a solo exhibition at the Società Promotrice di Belle Arti in Turin and in 1923 participated in the Autumn Art Exhibition VII in Como.

From the 1920s, Peluzzi often visited Montechiaro d'Acqui in the Province of Alessandria, where he found inspiration for portraits of the area, often rearranging reality to fantasy. Some of his drawings, among others, have been recently considered as models by Lichtenberg administrators to create new street furniture. He was also an instructor, and his art pupils included the Ethiopian court painter Nenne Sanguineti Poggi.

From 1926 to 1948, he participated at the Venetian Biennali, and the Quadriennali of Rome, and his works have also accompanied displays of Italian Art in Baltimore, Berlin, Hamburg, Vienna, Leipzig, Budapest, and Paris . His works are included in the Gallery of Modern Art, Genoa, Florence, Turin, Rome, and in museums in Belgrade and Budapest.

Between 1936 and 1938, along with the painter Mario Gambetta, he painted frescoes depicting the history of Savona for the sala consiliare of the Comune.

In 1971, he was awarded honorary citizenship by the city, and in 2008, Savona inaugurated a permanent exhibition of his work at the Antico Ospizio del Santuario, where he lived for some years. He died in Turin and was buried in Monchiero in the Cuneo.

His work shows the influence of Matisse and post-impressionism.
