= Nenne Sanguineti Poggi =

Italian painter (1909–2012)

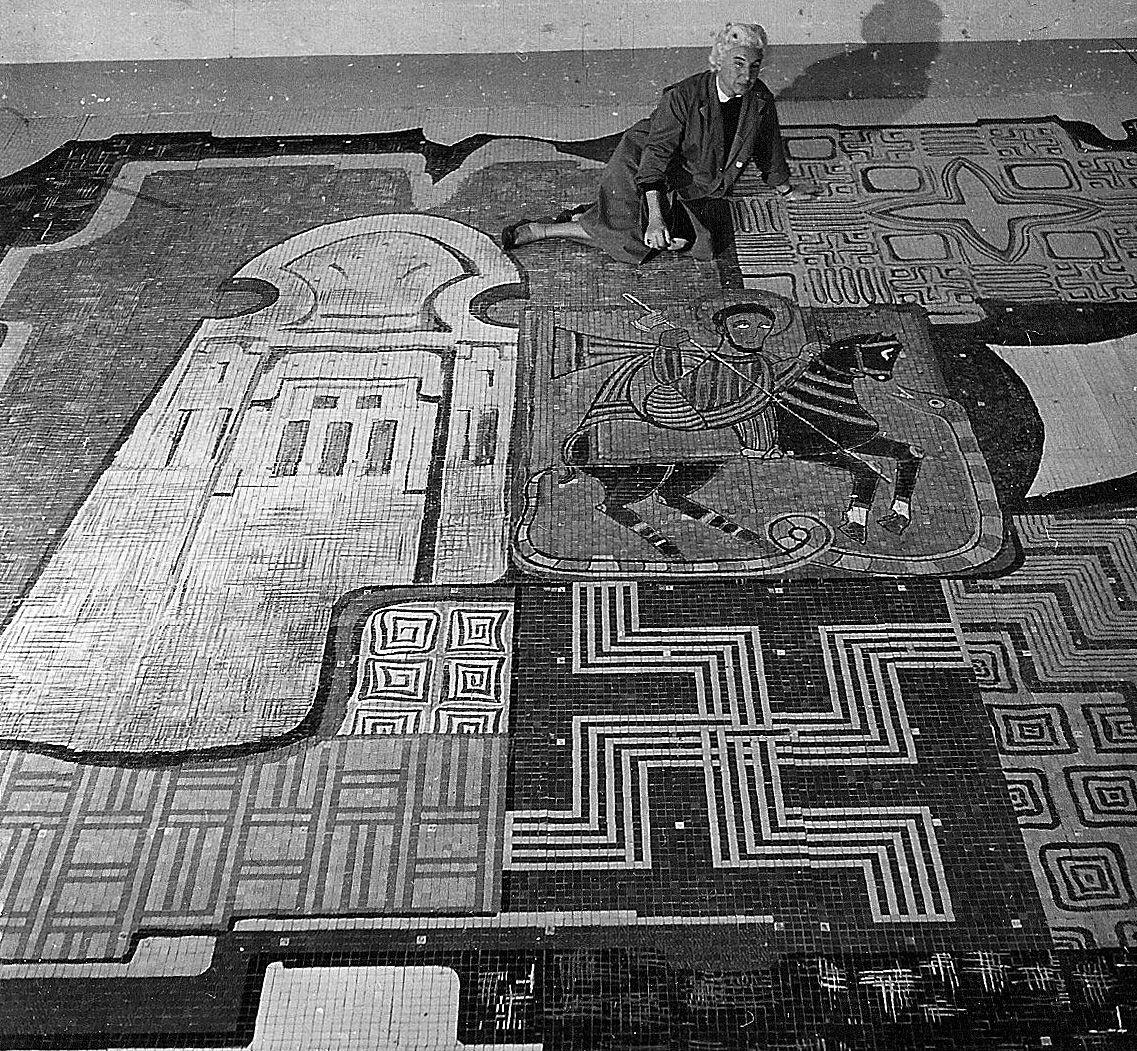
- Poggi posing with mosaic work
- Born: 1909; Savona, Italy
- Died: 2012
- Occupation: Artist
- Known for: Public commissions in Eritrea and Ethiopia

Nenne Sanguineti Poggi (1909–2012) was an Italian painter. She is best known for her public artworks in Eritrea and Ethiopia, and her commissions for Emperor Haile Selassie.

== Early life ==
Nenne Sanguineti Poggi was born in 1909 in Savona, Italy. She began training under the artist Eso Peluzzi, and early in her life she married before moving to Eritrea.

== Career ==
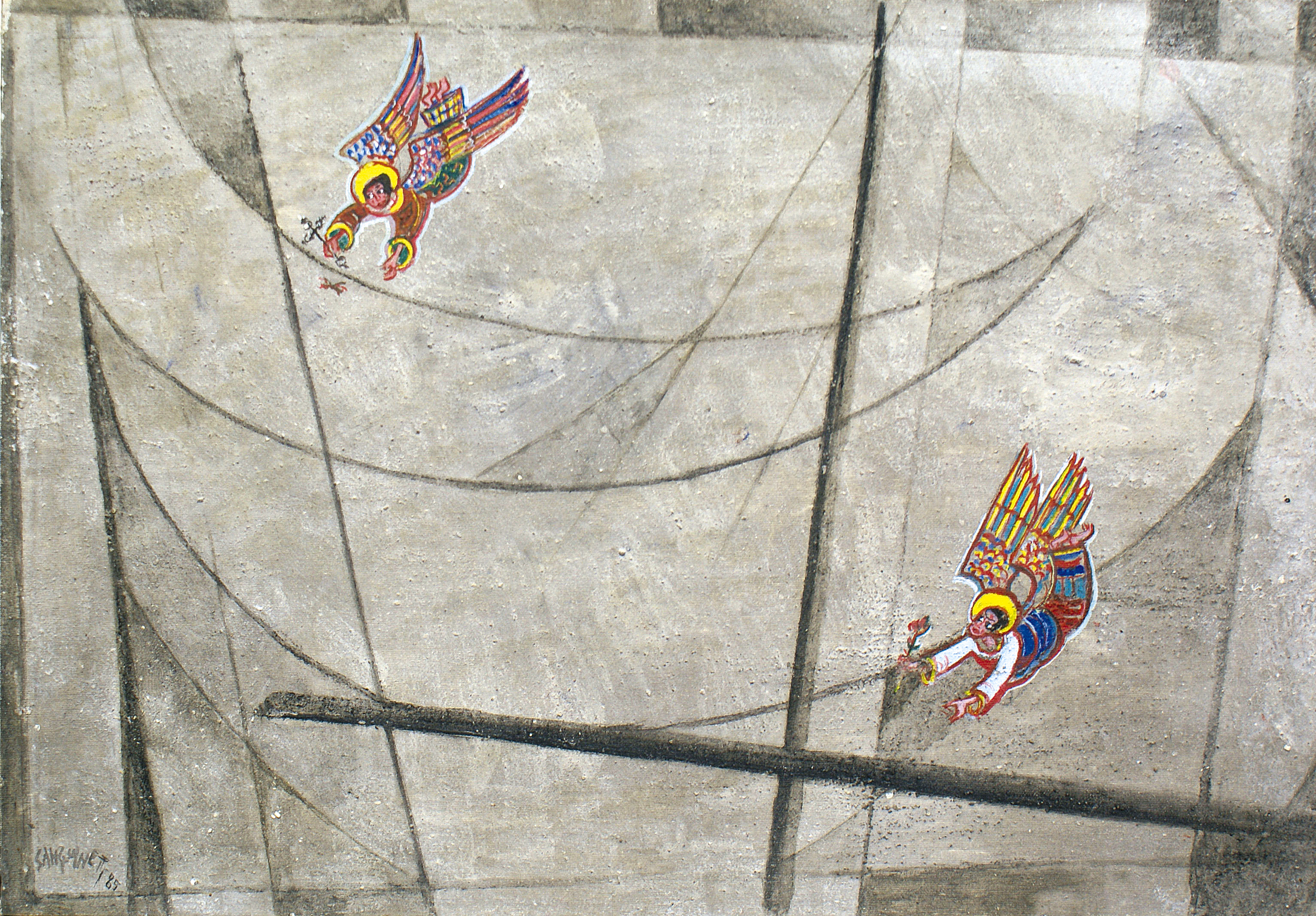
Angeli di Lalibela by Nenne Sanguineti Poggi

Poggi was commissioned for works by Emperor Haile Selassie of Ethiopia, creating public works in urban centers within both Eritrea and Ethiopia. Within these works, she sought to merge mid-20th century art movements with the African culture of her surroundings. She was also commissioned by others in the governments of Eritrea and Ethiopia, as well as private entities in the region. These large-scale mosaics were created in public squares, churches such as the Mariam Orthodox Cathedral in Asmara, the City Hall in Addis Ababa, United Nations buildings in Addis Ababa, and educational institutes. Her artwork involved both landscapes in the region and portraits of local residents, including both living portraits and expressionist works of others.

After thirty years in Africa, she returned to reside in Italy, where she claimed that her inspiration as a painter waned, leading her to paint from her memories of her time in Africa moving forward. Her later works included “painting, drawing, printmaking, and works that resembled ancient Ethiopian scrolls.”

== Death and post-humous exhibitions ==
Poggi died in 2012. A retrospective of her work entitled Artist Without Borders was shown at the America-Italy Society of Philadelphia, and her work has also been exhibited in institutions including the Museo d’Arte di Palazzo Gavotti.
