= Giacomo Grosso =

Italian painter (1860–1938)

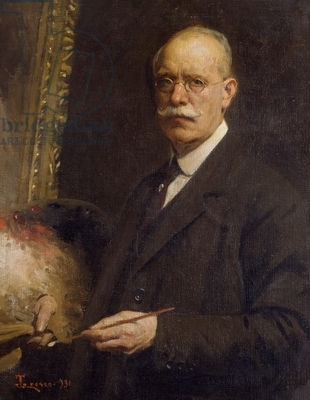
Selfportrait (1931).

Giacomo Grosso (23 May 1860 in Cambiano - 14 January 1938 in Turin) was an Italian painter.

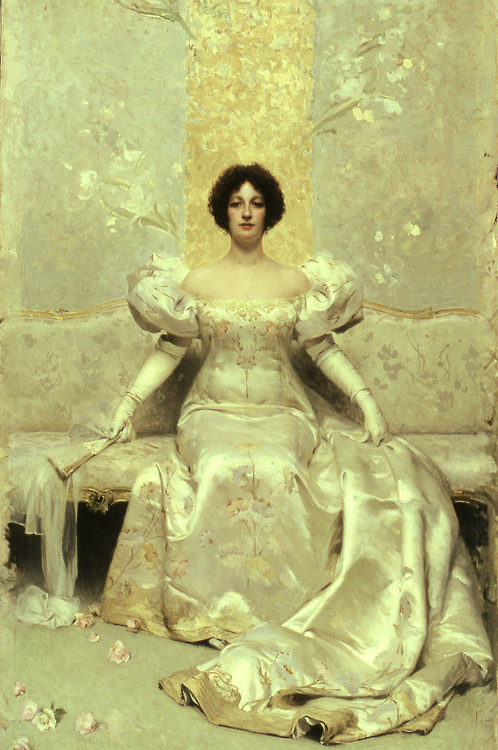
La Femme (1895) exhibited at the first Venice Biennale

== Biography ==
After spending his childhood at Glaveno seminary, Giacomo Grosso enrolled at the Accademia Albertina in Turin in 1873, thanks to a scholarship he was awarded by Cambiano Town Council. He became a pupil of Andrea Gastaldi and made his debut in 1882 at the 24th Esposizione della Società di Incoraggiamento alle Belle Arti di Torino, completing his studies the following year. In 1884, he participated in the Esposizione Generale Italiana in Turin with a painting inspired by La storia di una capinera by Giovanni Verga. After coming into contact with the Paris art scene through his many stays in the French capital, he continued to exhibit assiduously in the Turin Promotrici, the Venice Biennale from the first edition in 1895 (with a one-man show in 1912), and in other international shows (Paris, 1896; Munich, 1899; San Francisco, 1915) where he became acclaimed as a portraitist. From 1901 when he made his first journey to South America he began to receive commissions from Argentina and in 1910, for the celebration of the Argentinean Centennial in Buenos Aires, he executed a large commemorative canvas The panorama of the Battle of Maipú (lost in the fire in 1923), an episode in the War of Independence. From 1906 he held the chair of painting at the Accademia Albertina in Turin and in 1929 he was nominated senator of the Kingdom of Italy. His solo exhibition of over fifty works was curated by Leonardo Bistolfi at the Galleria Pesaro, Milan, in 1926.

Among his pupils are Arturo Conterno, Maurizio Pellegrini, Eso Pelluzi, and Giovanni Rava.

== Gallery ==
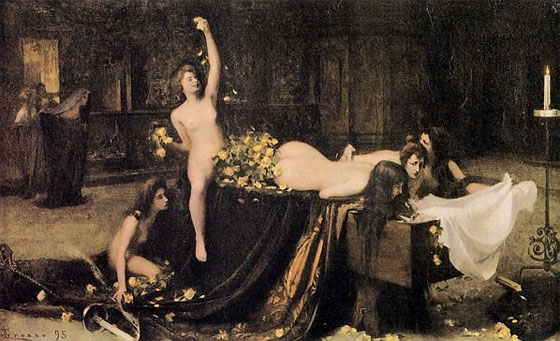
Supremo convegno (1895)

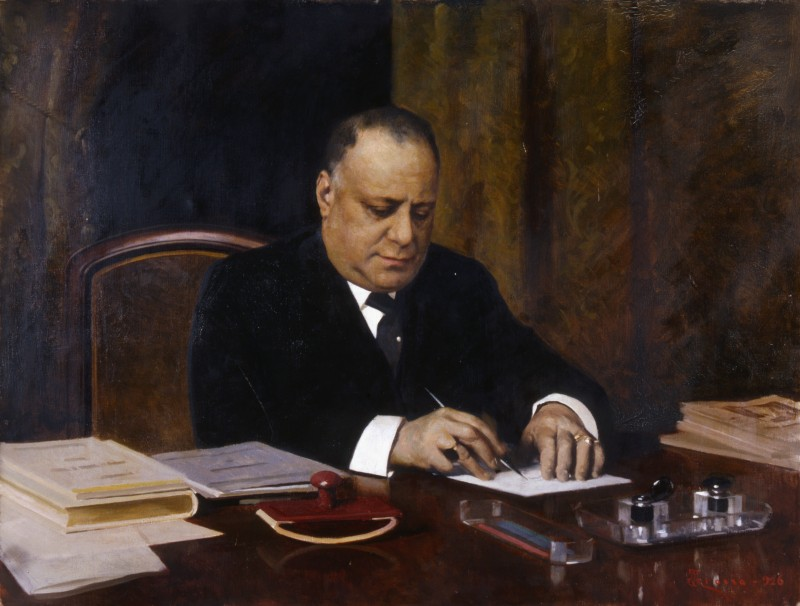
Cesare Sarfatti, Lawyer

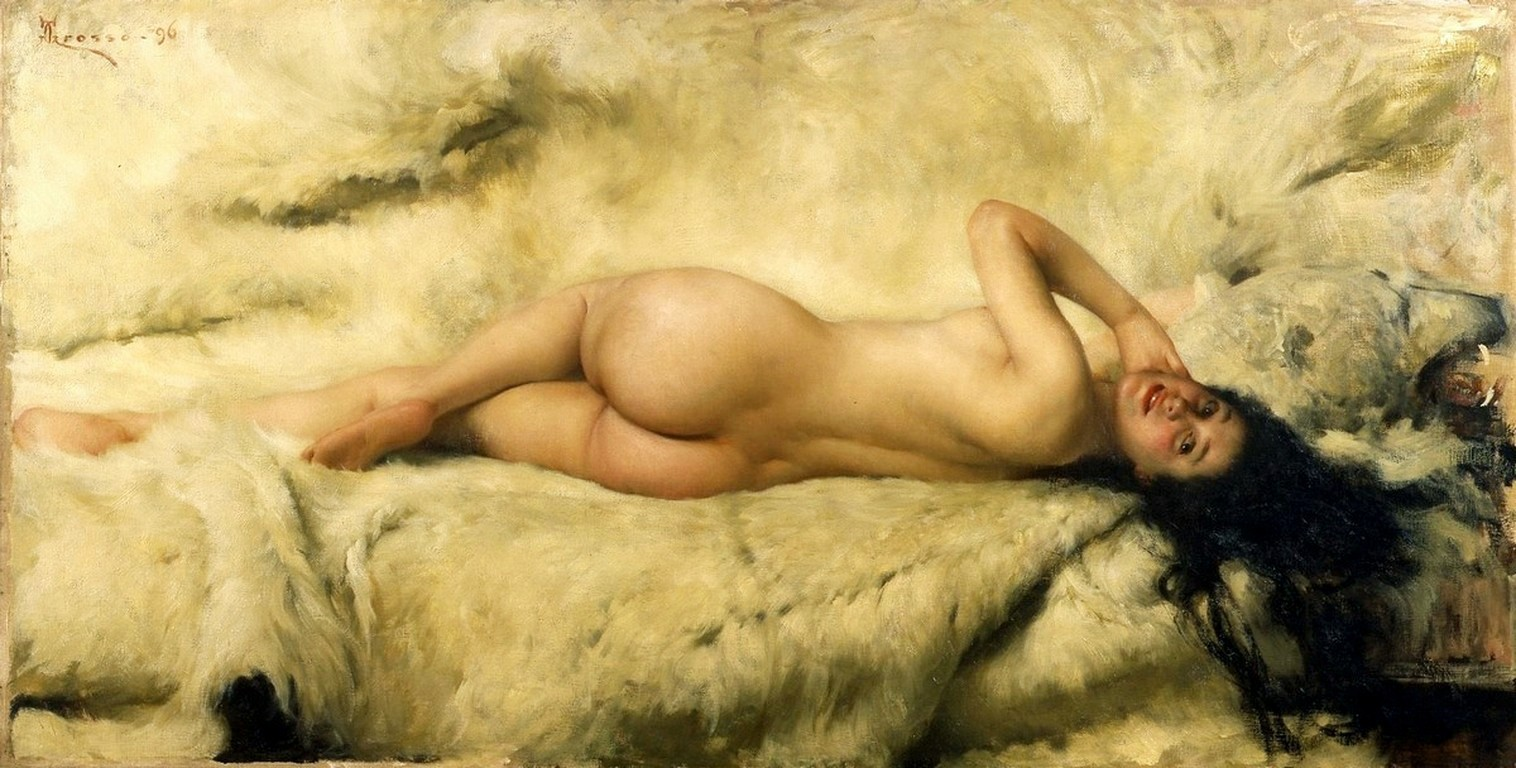
Nude (1896) GAM Torino

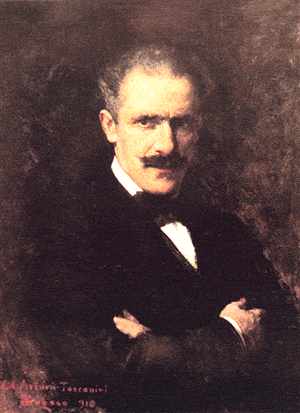
Toscanini

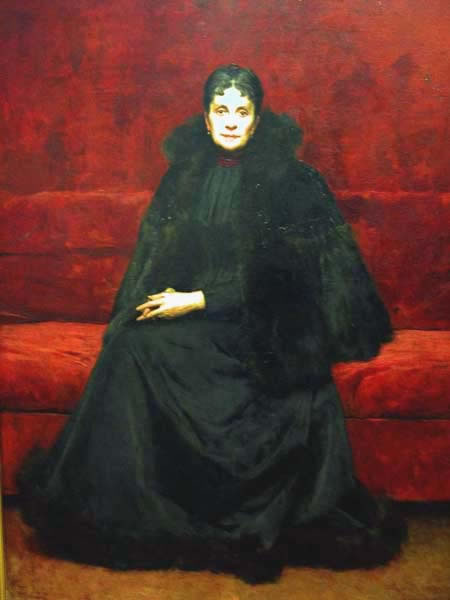
Lady Olympia Oytana Barucchi

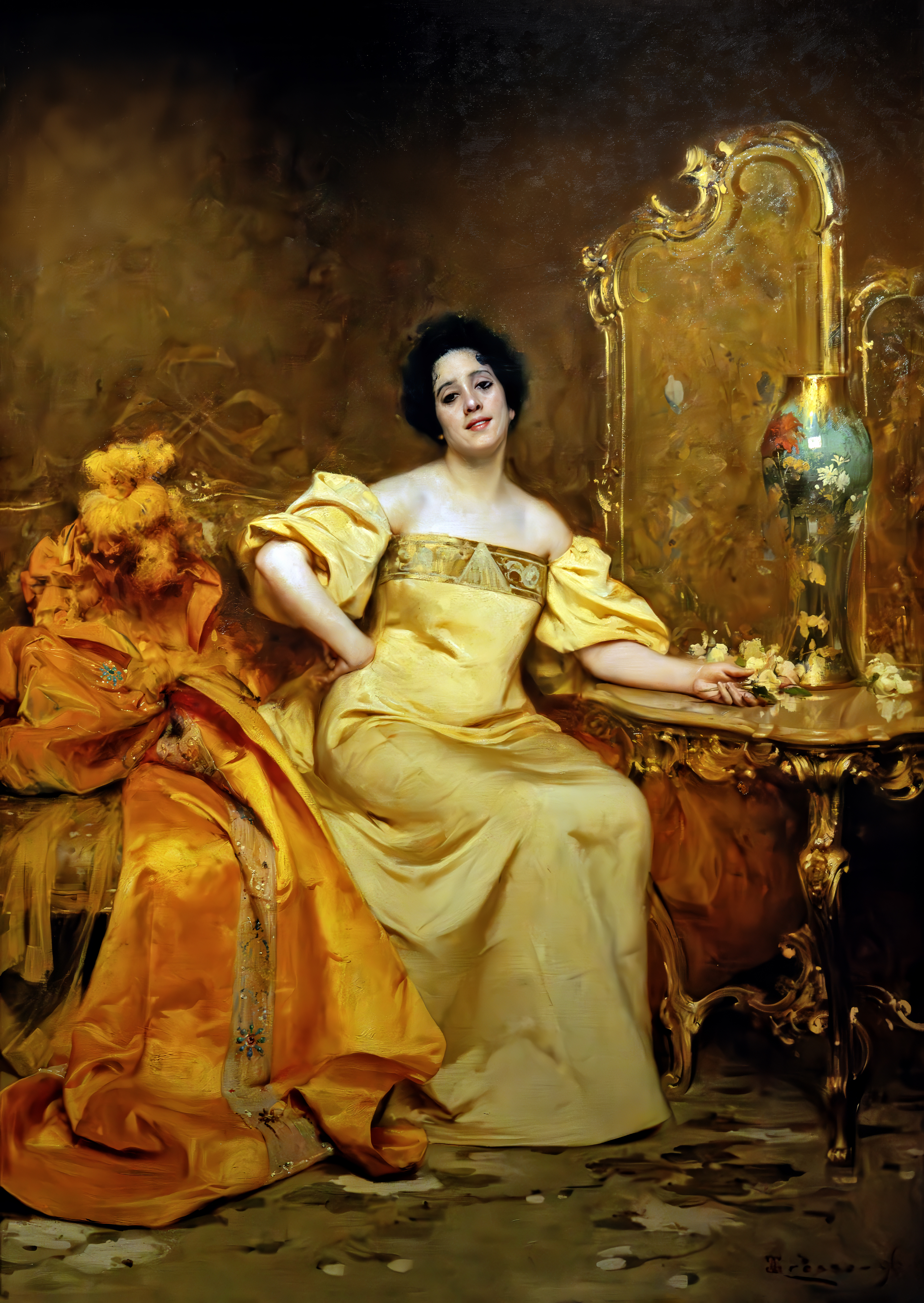
Virginia Reyter, actress (1896)

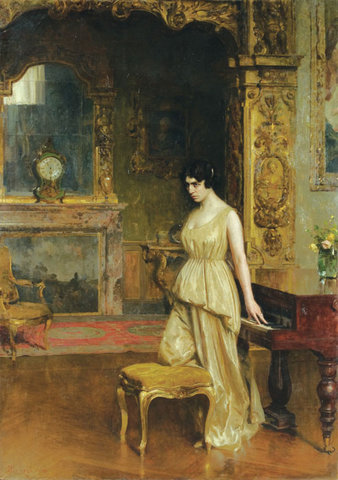
Harmony Interrupted (c. 1900)

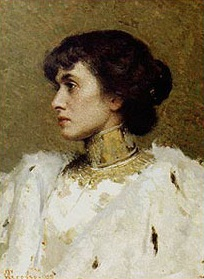
Lady in Ermine (c.1900)

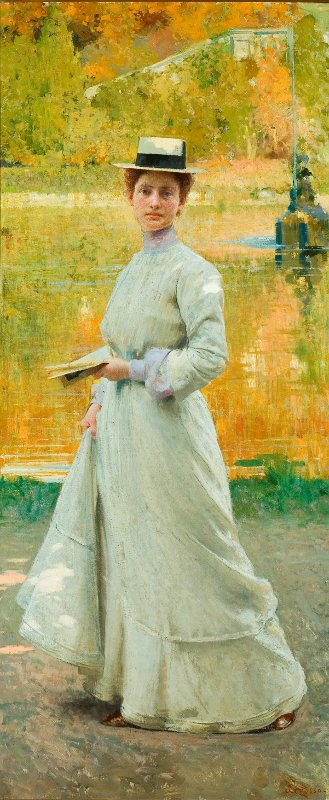
Portrait Allaria Aperta

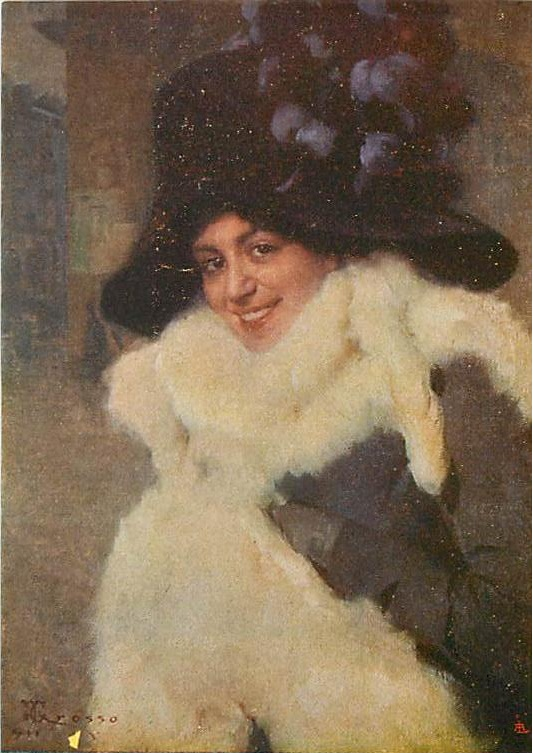
Smile

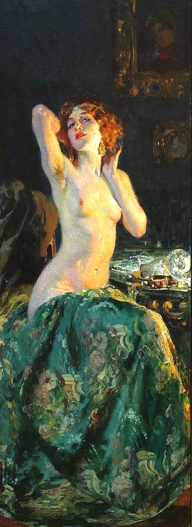
Mirror (1914)

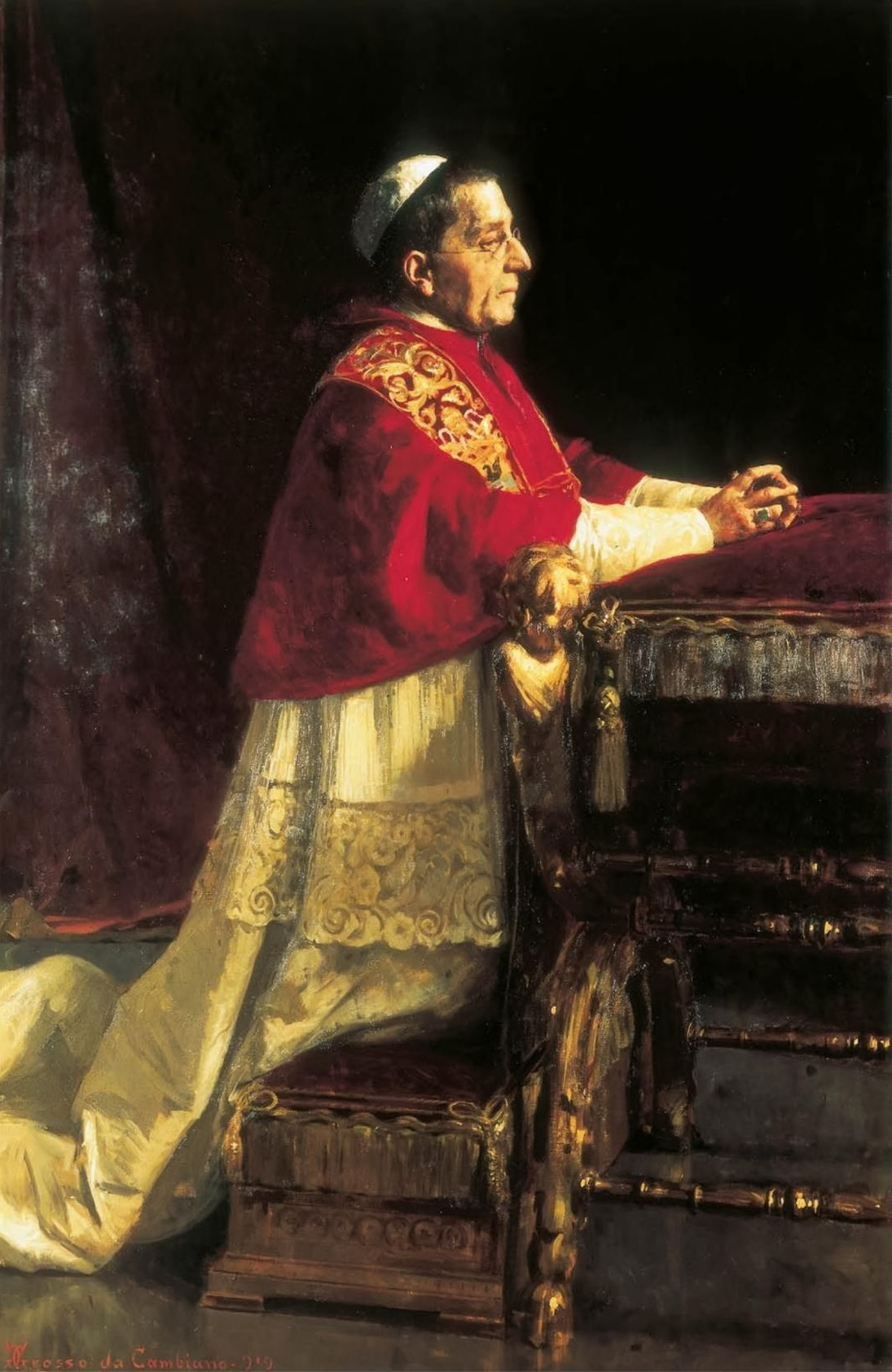
Pope Benedict XV praying (1919)

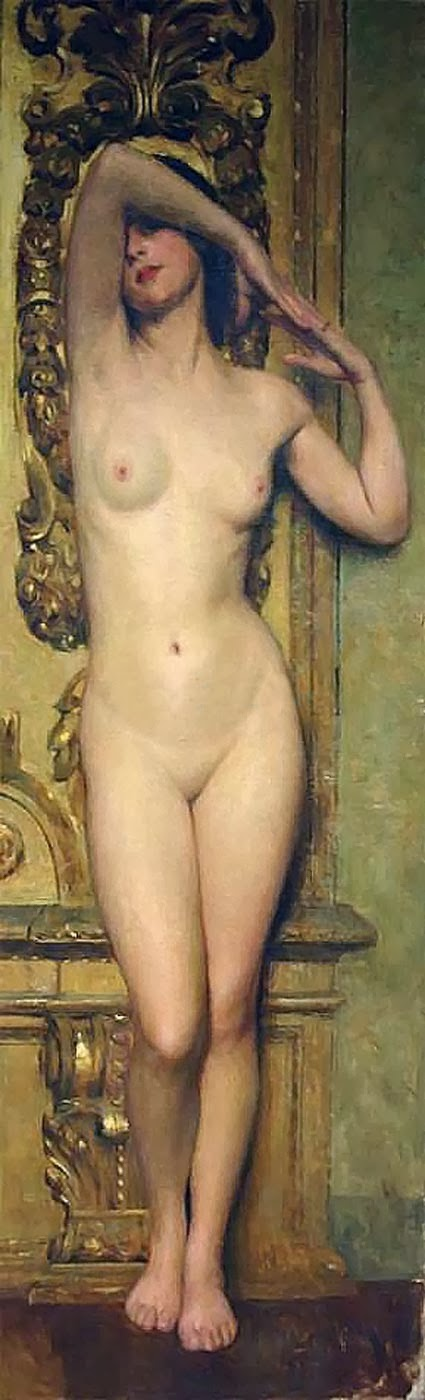
Nude

== Other projects ==
Media related to Giacomo Grosso at Wikimedia Commons
