= Giorgio Ceragioli (sculptor) =

Italian painter and sculptor

- Born: 28 April 1861; Porto Santo Stefano
- Died: 11 December 1947 (aged 86); Turin
- Known for: Sculpture
- Movement: Art Nouveau
- Patrons: Ulisse Cambi

Giorgio Ceragioli (28 April 1861 – 11 December 1947) was an Italian painter and sculptor.

== Biography ==
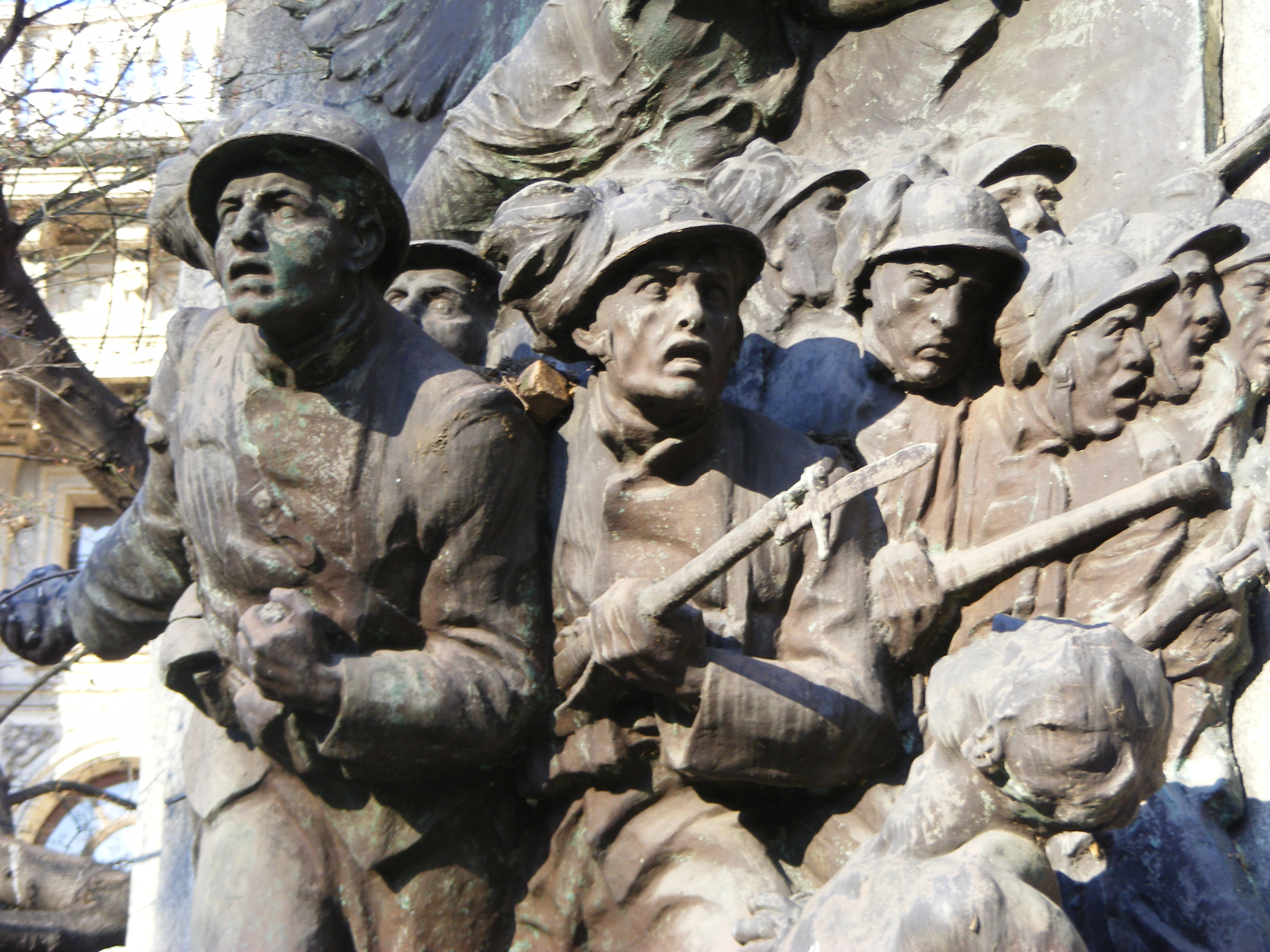
Sculpture for the centenary of Bersaglieri Corp, Turin, Lamarmora garden

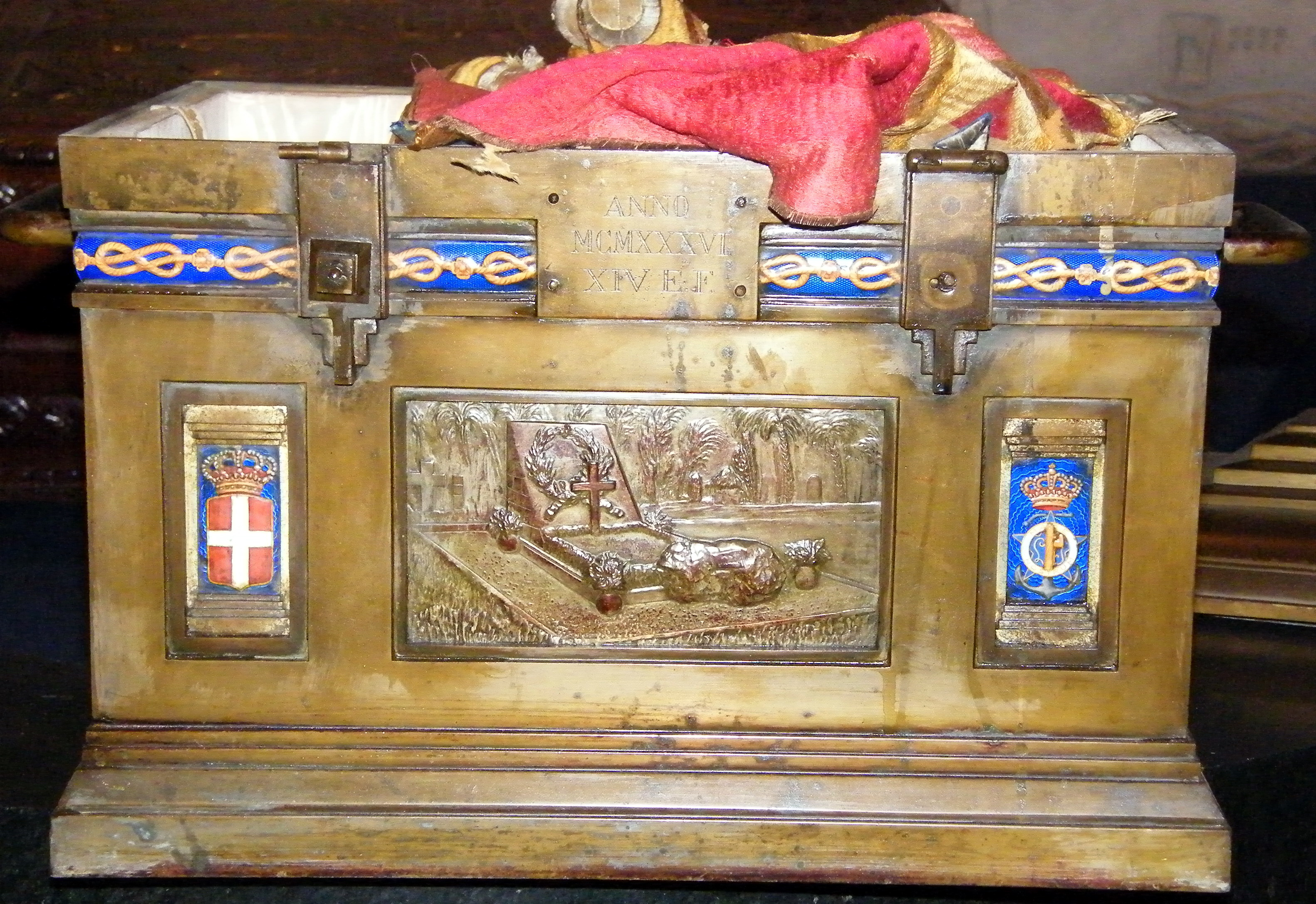
Flag of the Italian cruiser Luigi di Savoia Duca degli Abruzzi, sculpted by Giorgio Ceragioli

Ceragioli was born in Porto Santo Stefano (Tuscany) on 28 April 1861 from Giuseppe Ceragioli, a customs officer, and Fanny Bracci. He moved very young to Florence, where he received his first artistic training from the sculptor Ulisse Cambi.

When he was eighteen he enlisted in Bersaglieri corps, which he left in 1888 with a Lieutenant rank.

After moving to Turin Ceragioli worked with Augusto Ferri, a set designer and painter very active in Piemonte. In that city he also became a popular painter, mainly exhibiting his artworks in the local "Società Promotrice delle Belle Arti" (Fine Arts' Promotion Society).

As a sculptor in 1886 he created a large statue called "Un bersagliere alla carica" (Charging bersagliere), now located in Torino on the Royal Armoury's stairway. During the years around 1900 he was very active in the field of decorative arts realizing murals and bas-reliefs. He notably realized the artistic decorations of Palazzo Marsaglia (Milan) and worked for a long time in Turin for the "Teatro Regio" (Royal Theatre) both as painter and as set designer. In 1904 Ceragioli conceived and realized the FIAT's stand at the Paris Motor Show. In the same years he was attending to applied arts creating several trademarks, textile designs and functional objects which later would have qualified him as a designer. Also belongs to this field of Ceragioli's activity his involvement in the elaboration of the "Manifesto programmatico per l’Esposizione Internazionale di Arte Decorativa di Torino" (Program Manifesto for the International Applied Arts' Exhibition of Torino, 1902). In 1902 he established with his fellow artists Leonardo Bistolfi, Davide Calandra, Enrico Reycend and Enrico Thovez an important journal devoted to decorative arts, "L'arte decorativa moderna"; it was a monthly magazine about art and decoration of homes which had an important influence on Italian decorative arts' history. In 1914 with Cesare Biscarra Ceragioli realized in Valentino Park of Torino a monument to Ascanio Sobrero. After World War I his artistic activity went on both as sculptor and as painter: noticeable among this period's sculptures are an Alpino's statue in Villar Perosa and the bronze high relief conceived to commemorate dead bersaglieri of the Great War; sculpted in 1923 it was located in 1936 in the Lamarmora gardens of Turin.

He died in Turin on 11 December 1947.
