= Ragusa =

Ragusa may refer to:

== Places ==
=== Croatia ===
- Ragusa, Dalmatia, the historical name of the city of Dubrovnik
- the Republic of Ragusa, the maritime city-state based in the city of Ragusa (Dubrovnik)
- Ragusa Vecchia, historical Italian name of Cavtat, a town near Dubrovnik

=== Italy ===
- Ragusa, Sicily, a city and commune
- Ragusa Ibla, a historic quarter of the Sicilian city
- Province of Ragusa, one of the administrative divisions of Sicily

== People ==
- Ragusa (surname)

== Other ==
- City of Ragusa, a sailboat
- Ragusa (chocolate), a range of products from Swiss chocolate-maker Camille Bloch
- Ragusa (horse), a racehorse
- Ragusa Calcio, an Italian association football club located in Ragusa
- University of Ragusa, located in Ragusa and Ragusa Ibla, Italy, and founded in 1998
- Count of Ragusa, the title of Geoffrey, son of Roger I of Sicily
- Duke of Ragusa (disambiguation)

== See also ==
- Ragasa
- Ragusan (disambiguation)
