= Enrico Reycend =

Italian painter (1855–1928)

Enrico Reycend (Turin, Kingdom of Sardinia, November 3, 1855 – Turin, Kingdom of Italy, February 21, 1928) was an Italian painter, mainly of landscapes and vedute.

== Biography ==
He attended the Accademia Albertina under Lorenzo Delleani and Antonio Fontanesi. He traveled to Paris a few times, and was influenced by the circle of Camille Corot. In 1877 at Naples, he exhibited: In Piemonte; in 1880 at Turin, La quiete; Natura mesta; in 1881 at Milan, he sent: In Ottobre; Sul Canavese; Rive del Pò; in 1883 at Milan, Ritorno dal Pascolo; Lungo il Pò a Turin; in 1883 to Rome, Dintorni di Torino; and finally in 1884 also to Rome, Il Barchetta; Ultime foglie and other landscapes painted al vero.

In 1885, he sent to Milan and Venice: In Ottobre; Greek temple nel Porto dì Genoa. In 1886 at Milan, he displayed: Giornata triste; Studi dal vero; Notte d'autunno. At the 1887 Mostra of Venice he sent: Pomeriggio; Studi dal vero; Fine d'agosto: The Port of Genoa: in 1888 to Bologna: Mattino tra i monti; Rain in the Port of Genoa; Scalo di Ferrovia a Turin; Settembre in montagna; and Sole velato; and finally in 1889 to Florence, he sent: Tra i monti.

Reycend, along with Davide Calandra, Leonardo Bistolfi, Giorgio Ceragioli and Enrico Thovez founded in 1902 the journal, L’arte decorativa moderna .
