= Ragusa (surname) =

Ragusa is a surname. Notable people with the surname include:

- Antonino Ragusa, (born 1990) Italian footballer
- Carmine Ragusa, fictional character from "Laverne & Shirley"
- Cinzia Ragusa (born 1977), Italian water polo player
- Eleonora Ragusa (1861–1939), also known as Kiyohara Tama, Kiyohara Otama, or Ragusa Tama, Japanese painter
- Kym Ragusa (born 1966), American writer and film director
- Vincenzo Ragusa (1841–1927), Italian sculptor hired by the Japanese government
