= Ubertalli =

Ubertalli is a surname. Notable people with the surname include:

- Romolo Ubertalli (1871–1958), Italian painter
- Ruggero Ubertalli (1877–1973), Italian equestrian
