= Duke of Ragusa =

Duke of Ragusa may refer to:

- Duke of Ragusa (Marmont), a French title of nobility, created in 1808
- Duke of Ragusa (Habsburg), an Austrian title of nobility, created in 1814
- the term is sometimes also used (colloquially, and incorrectly) for the Rector of Ragusa

== See also ==
- Duke (disambiguation)
- Ragusa (disambiguation)
