= Monument to Bartolomé Mitre =

Coordinates: 34.5843°S 58.3961°W

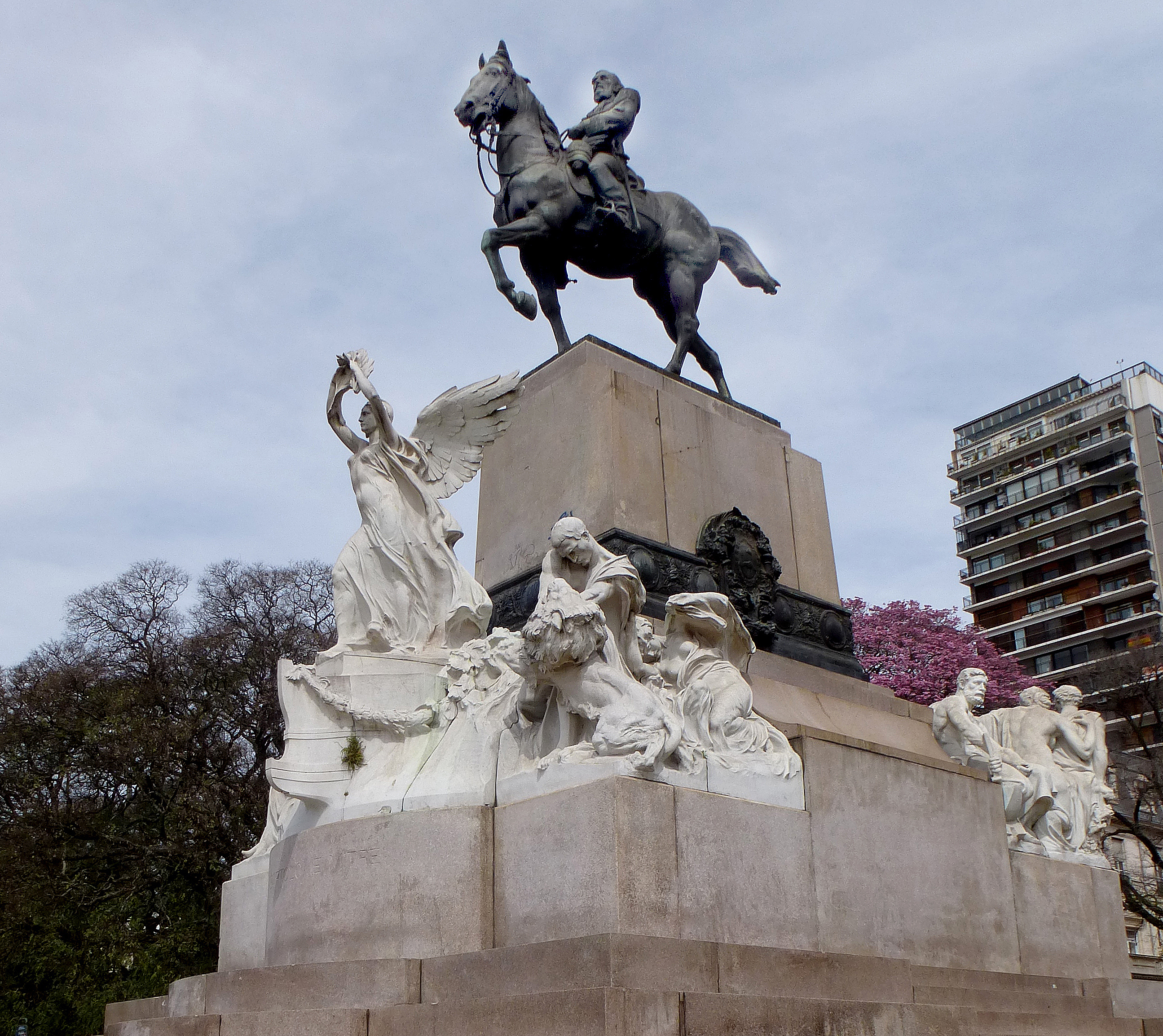

The Monumento ecuestre a Bartolomé Mitre located on Plaza Mitre, a landmark in the Recoleta neighbourhood of Buenos Aires, Argentina, and was raised in honor of Bartolomé Mitre (1821–1906).

== History ==
It is a work by Italian sculptors David Calandra and Eduardo Rubino in 1927.

The Mitre bronze figure stands on a polished red granite base surrounded by allegories of Carrara marble. The monument was inaugurated on July 8, 1927, with a speech by the Minister of War, General Agustín P. Justo.

== Location ==
Located on the Plaza Mitre, between the British Embassy and Biblioteca Nacional. Across the Del Libertador avenue, opposite to the Memorial, is located the Plaza Ruben Dario, and the Museo Nacional de Bellas Artes.
