= Monument to Antonio Fontanesi, Parco del Populo, Reggio Emilia =

Memorial in Italy

Coordinates: 44°42′07″N 10°37′55″E

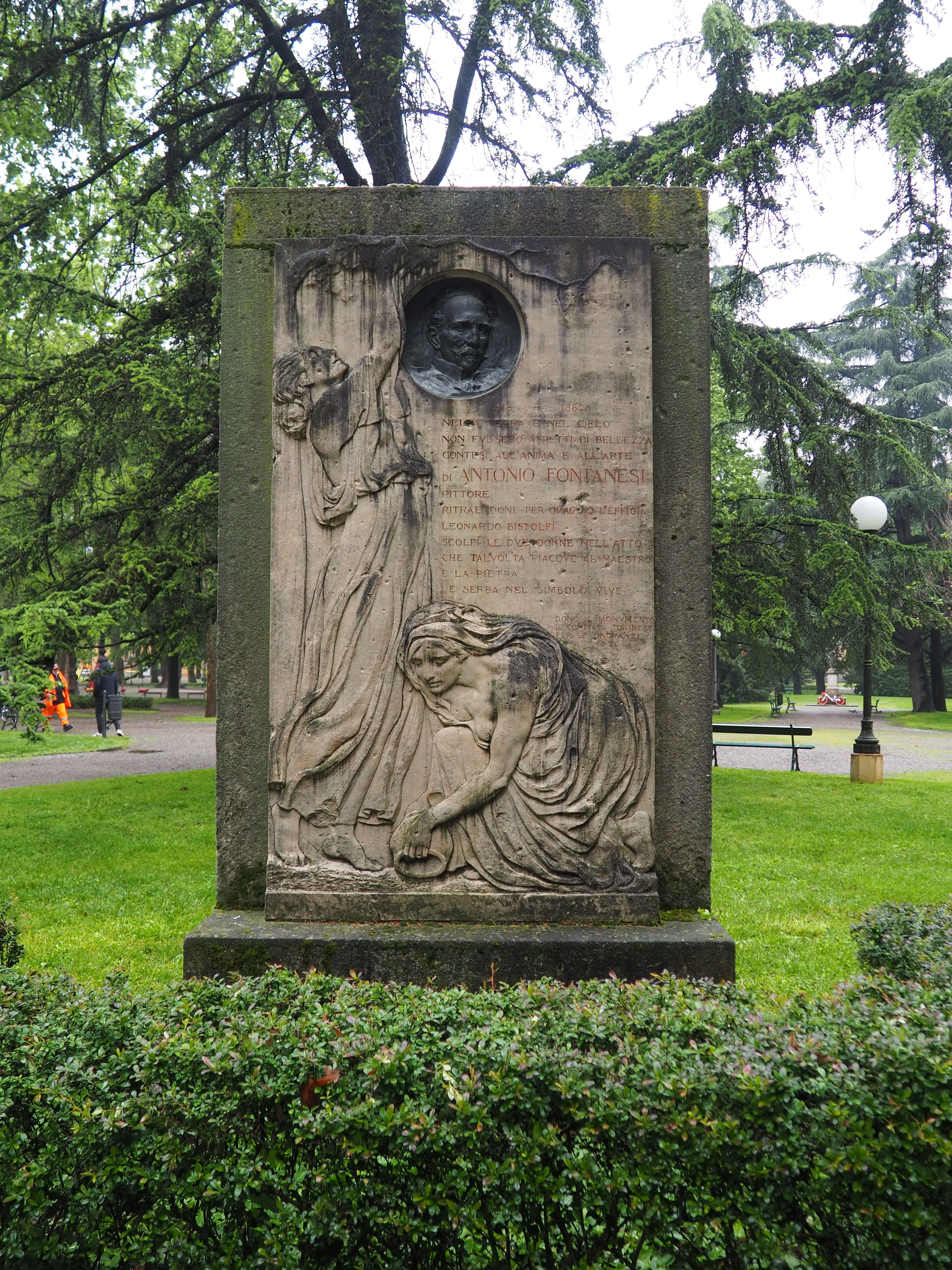
Monument to Antonio Fontanesi

The Monument to Antonio Fontanesi is located the east side of the Parco del Popolo (Giardini Pubblici) in central Reggio Emilia, region of Emilia-Romagna, Italy. The monument is located near Viale Leopoldo Nobili. In the park, there is a distinct Bust of Antonio Fontanesi, sculpted by Marino Mazzacurati and donated to the city in 1937 by Anna e Luigi Parmeggiani. In the south sector of central Reggio Emilia, there is also a piazza Antonio Fontanesi.

== Description ==
The monument is dedicated to the Antonio Fontanesi (1818 - 1882), born in Reggio Emilia. Fontanesi traveled extensively, including at long stays in Japan and London. He served professor of landscape painting at the Accademia Albertina from 1869 to 1876, where Bistolfi would come to study in 1880. Bistolfi in 1883 had produced a portrait bust of Fontanesi. According to the inscription, the monument was donated by a committee from Turin in 1921. It depicts two women, one harvesting from a high vine, the other collecting water. A bronze round bas-relief depiction is in the upper center. The inscription generally translates to read: "In the earth and the sky / no aspects of beauty were resplendant / to contend with the soul and art / of Antonio Fontanesi / Painter / We depict in homage his picture / Leonardo Bistolfi / and sculpt two women in actions / which pleased the teacher / and which the stone / maintains their symbolism alive."
