= Monument to Carlo Goldoni =

Statue in Florence by Ulisse Cambi

Coordinates: 43°46′15.33″N 11°14′51.90″E

The Monument to Carlo Goldoni is a white marble outdoor statue inaugurated in 1873 to commemorate the Venetian dramatist. The monument is located in a piazza of the same name, formerly called Piazza delle Travi, in front of Ponte alla Carraia, in the quartiere of Santa Maria Novella of Florence, region of Tuscany, Italy. The name of the piazza, which had reflected a postern leading to a port in the Arno River for wood barges, was renamed in 1907 on the 200th anniversary of Goldoni's birth.

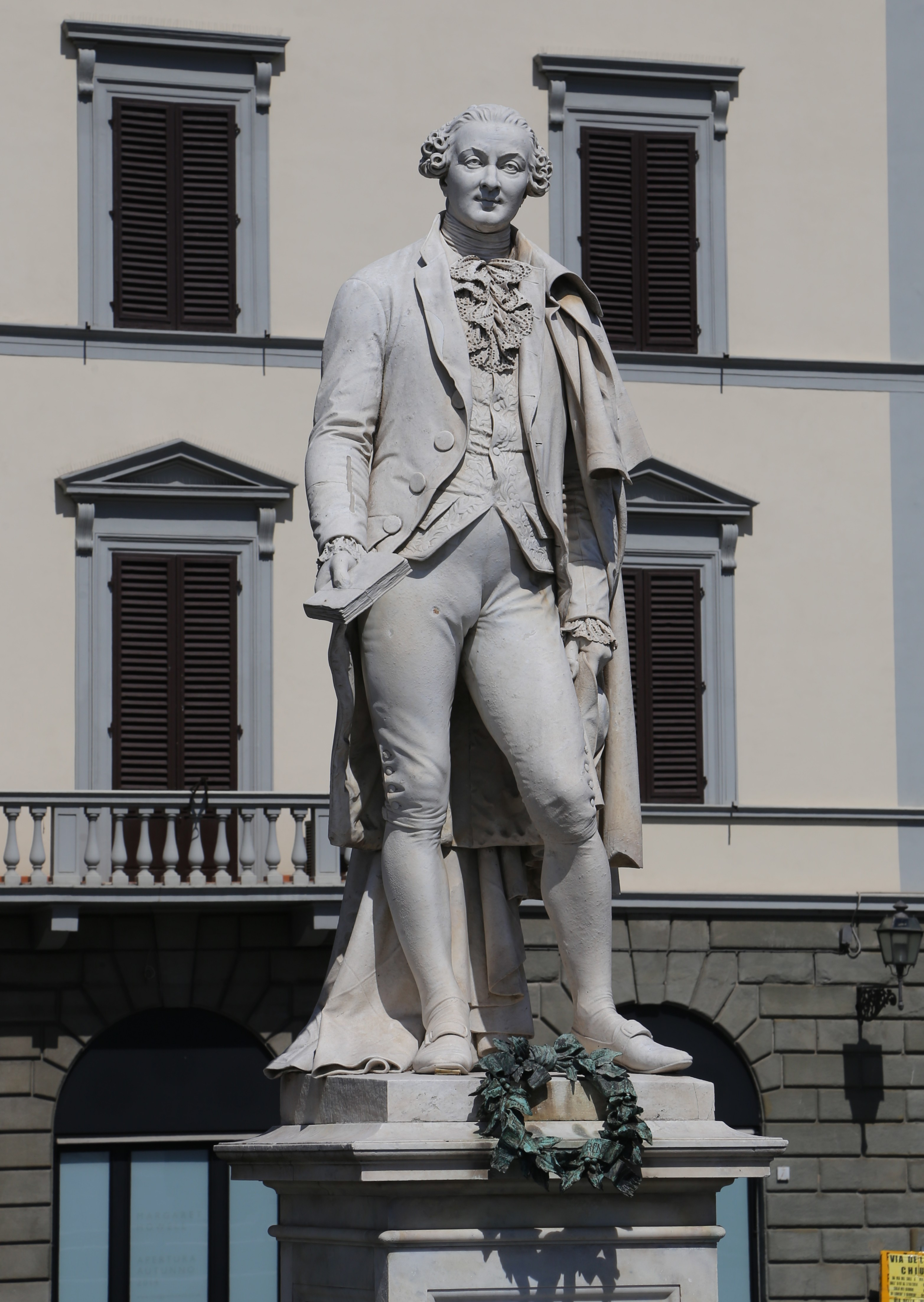
Marble Statue of Goldoni

The statue was commissioned in 1858 by the Società Filodrammatica cittadina (Società dei Permanenti Concordi) from the sculptor Ulisse Cambi. The base was constructed by Mariano Falcinil.

The statue was damaged during the bombing of Florentine bridges in August 1944, but the damage was repaired. In April 2014, the base was vandalized with graffiti, soon cleaned. The right thumb on the book has also been lost.
