= Carlo Follini =

Italian painter (1848–1938)

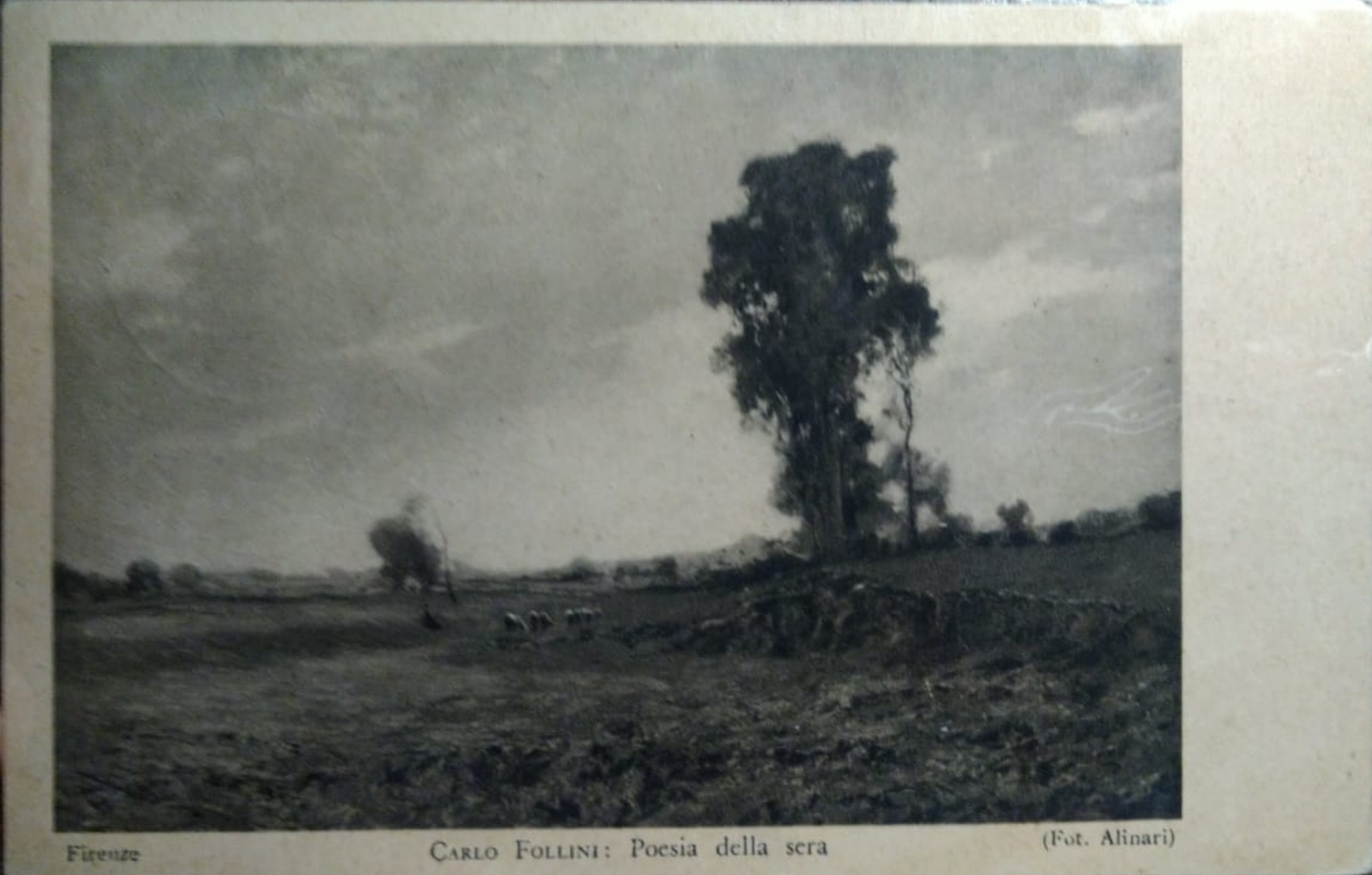
Evening Poetry - from a 1939 postcard

Carlo Follini (24 August 1848 – 1938) was an Italian painter, depicting landscapes.

== History ==
He was born in Domodossola in the Piedmont. He studied accounting in Turin, but chose at the age of 24 years to study painting at the Accademia Albertina, then under the leadership of Antonio Fontanesi. Among his works are:

- Campagna napoletana
- La siesta
- Sui monti
- Guado
- Canal grande a Venezia
- Frasche dorate
- Silenzio verde
- La dent du Geant

In 1883, fifteen studies from nature were exhibited at Rome. He painted Alpine Watering-place held in the National Gallery of Modern Art at Rome. He is said to be one of the prized pupils of Fontanesi, due to his sprezzatura and force and energy of his coloring in his studies from nature. He moved to Bologna to enter military, but went into art studies. He also traveled to Venice, Milan, Florence, and Naples. Among his pupils was Romolo Ubertalli.
