= Davide Calandra =

Italian sculptor

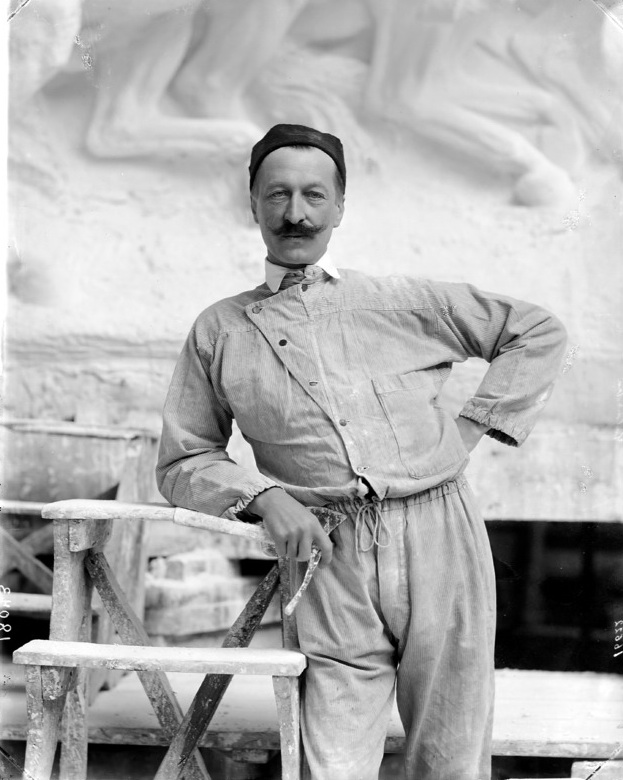
- Born: 21 October 1856; Turin, Kingdom of Sardinia
- Died: 8 September 1915 (aged 58); Turin, Italy
- Education: Accademia Albertina
- Known for: Sculpture
- Movement: Symbolism, Realism
- Patrons: Odoardo Tabacchi

Davide Calandra (21 October 1856 – 8 September 1915) was an Italian sculptor and cabinet maker.

== Biography ==
Davide Calandra was born in Turin into a wealthy family. His father, besides his professional activities of lawyer and hydraulic engineer, was an archaeologist and a well known collector of ancient weapons.

Davide's eldest brother, the writer Edoardo Calandra, was a prominent author who wrote the novel La bufera, an example of historical fiction.

After attending the Liceo Calandra followed the art lectures of the Accademia Albertina and then joined as a volunteer the cavalry where he attained the military rank of Sottotenente (Sub-Lieutenant). In 1878 he worked with his father and his brother to an excavation of the Lombard archaeological site of Testona (Moncalieri).

One of Calandra's first sculptures, Vigils of Penelope, was displayed in 1880 at the Turin's Exhibition of Fine Arts. At the 1884 National Exhibition in Turin, he displayed three works: Judah, Tigre Reale, and Fior di Chiostro. Calandra Also completed many portrait busts and bas-reliefs.

In 1902, with his fellow artists Leonardo Bistolfi, Giorgio Ceragioli, Enrico Reycend and Enrico Thovez, Calandra helped establish the journal L'arte decorativa moderna, which was devoted to decorative arts. From 1912 he was appointed president of the Piedmontese Society of Archaeology and Fine Arts (Società Piemontese di Archeologia e Belle Arti). He died in Turin in 1915.

== Selected artworks ==
His sculptures include a Garibaldi statue in the piazza of the same name in front of the Palazzo del Governatore, Parma and an equestrian monument of Prince Luigi Amedeo, Duke of the Abruzzi, commissioned by the city of Turin and located in the park of Valentino.

He also completed the monument to King Umberto II in Villa Borghese (Rome); this statue was completed after the sculptor's death. Calandra also completed a large monument of the Argentinian politician and writer Bartolomé Mitre; the monument is found in Buenos Aires .

His vast artistic production also includes some Italian coins made between 1908 and 1916 during the rule of Victor Emmanuel III of Italy.

The municipal museum Antonino Olmo of Savigliano houses the Gipsoteca Davide Calandra which shows several of his plasterworks.
