= Ulisse Cambi =

Italian sculptor

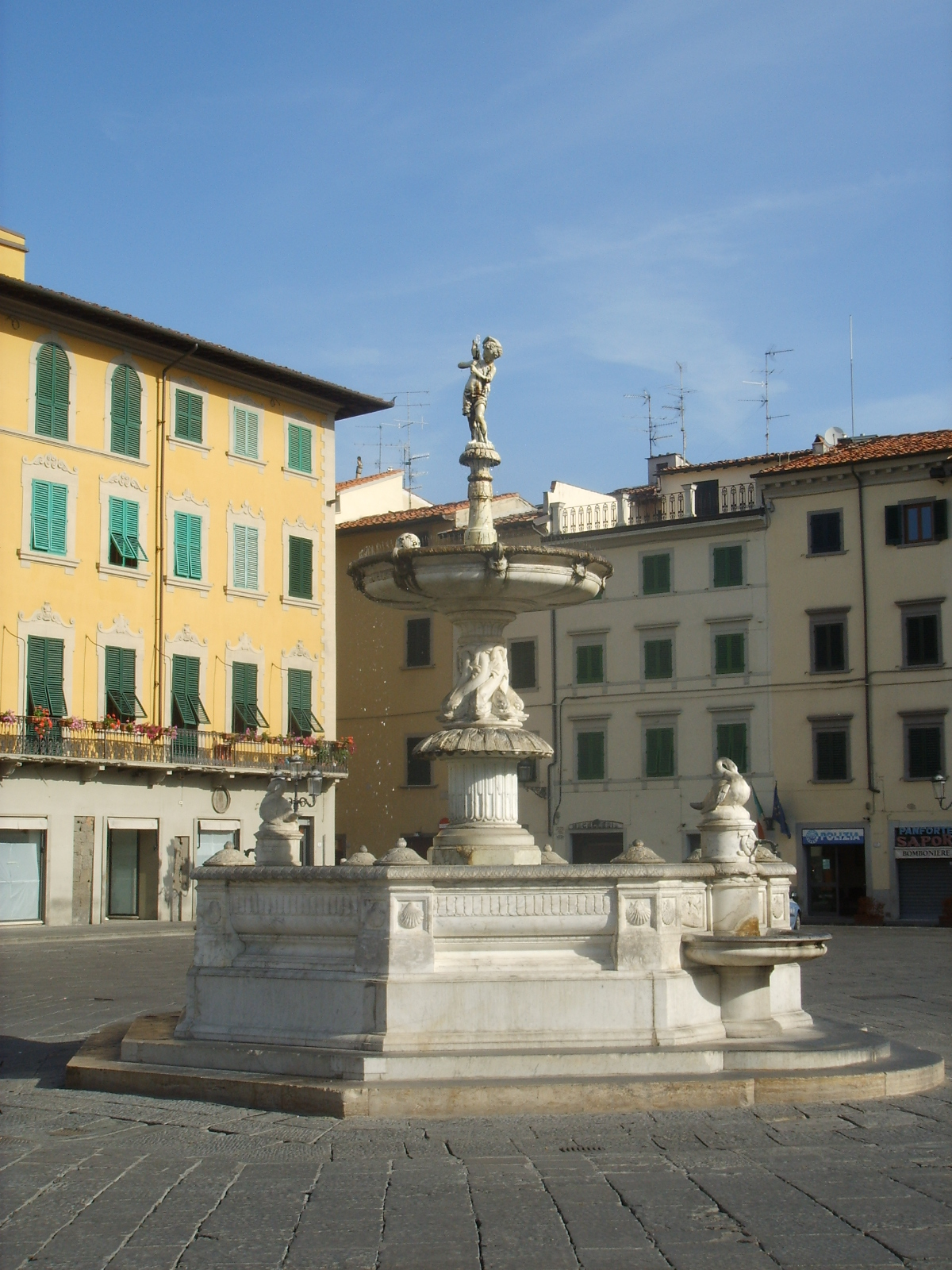
- Fountain sculpted by Ulisse Cambi in Prato (Italy)
- Born: 22 September 1807; Florence
- Died: 7 April 1895 (aged 87); Florence
- Education: Accademia di Belle Arti Firenze
- Known for: Sculpture
- Notable work: Monument to Carlo Goldoni
- Movement: Neoclassicism

Ulisse Cambi (22 September 1807 – 7 April 1895) was an Italian sculptor active in Tuscany during the 19th century.

== Biography and artworks ==
Son of the sculptor Pietro Cambi, he was born in Florence where he studied at the Accademia di Belle Arti di Firenze and in 1833, after winning a four-year stipendium, continued his training in Rome. While there he completed several works in gesso, including a Daphnis and Chloe (1834; Florence, Palazzo Pitti; marble version, 1841) executed in an academic classical style.

He returned to Florence about 1837 and for a time struggled to gain recognition, but by 1841, after having been nominated to, and given a professorship in the Accademia, he began to obtain numerous important commissions. He gained esteem for his funerary monuments, among them one to the painter Luigi Sabatelli (1844; Santa Croce, Florence) that is noted for its unsparingly realistic depiction of the dying man’s wasted body.

From the 1840s on he realised several important artworks such as the statues of Benvenuto Cellini (1845; Florence, Uffizi) and the dramatist Carlo Goldoni (1873) located in front of Ponte alla Carraia in the quartiere of Santa Maria Novella, Florence. He also completed a monument to Francesco Burlamacchi for the Piazzale San Michele in Lucca. By tempering Neoclassical severity with a lively naturalism, he produced images that attained great popularity. Love as a Beggar, displayed at the Exposition Universelle in Paris in 1855, generated the demand for over 30 copies.

His depictions of children, such as those appearing in the group Eve and her Sons (1857), proved especially appealing to a 19th-century audience. Throughout his prolific career he fluctuated between Neoclassical and realistic impulses, usually eschewing a grand manner in favour of engaging but sometimes overly prettified works. During his late days the prevailing realistic artistic movement made his neoclassical style becoming old-fashioned and turned away from him the favour of art criticism. He had a studio at Viale Principe Eugenio #20 in Florence. He died in Florence in 1895 at the age of 87. His best known students included Giovanni Dupré from Siena and Giorgio Ceragioli, who was mainly active in Piemonte.

== Selected works ==
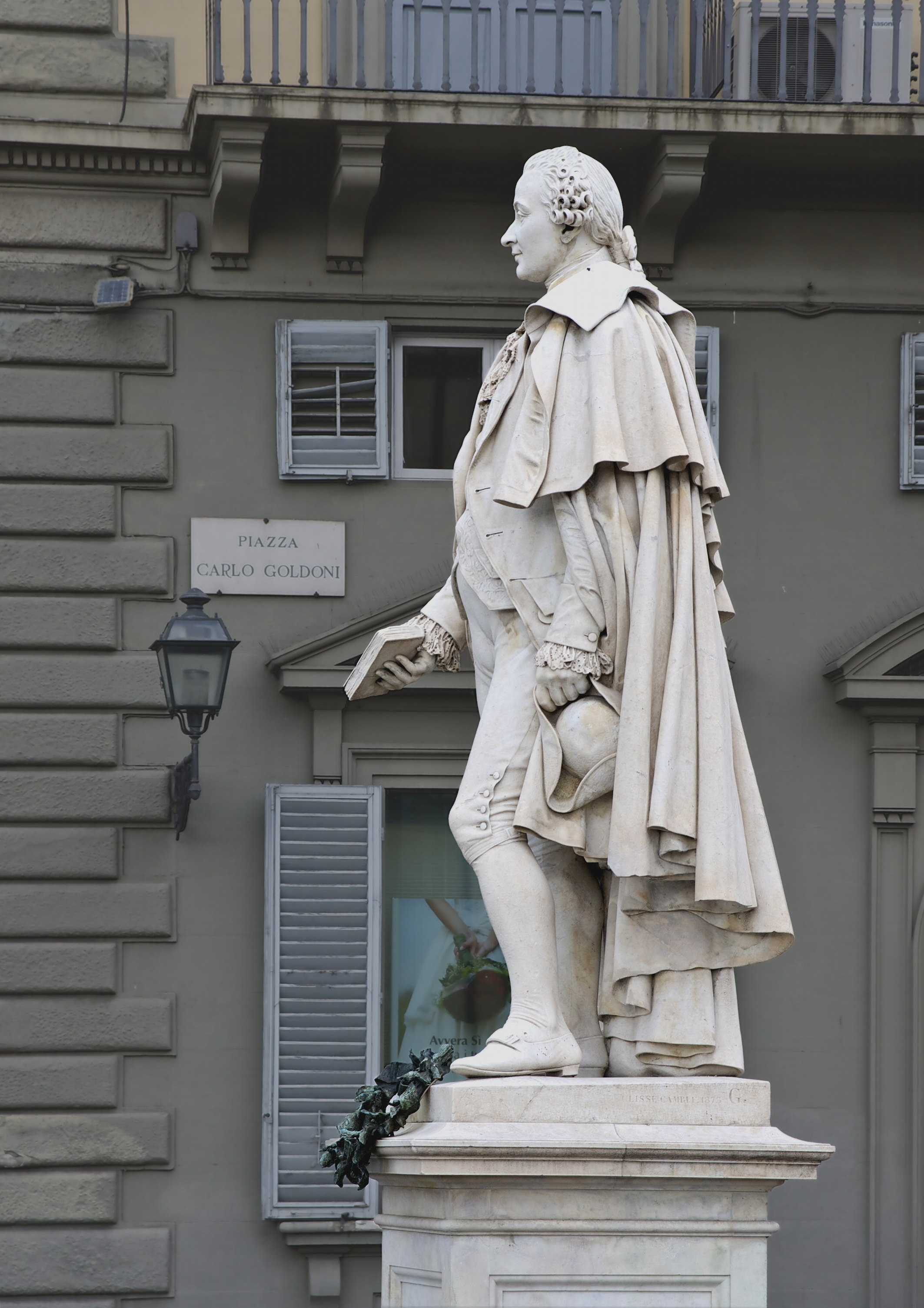
Statue of Carlo Goldoni in Florence

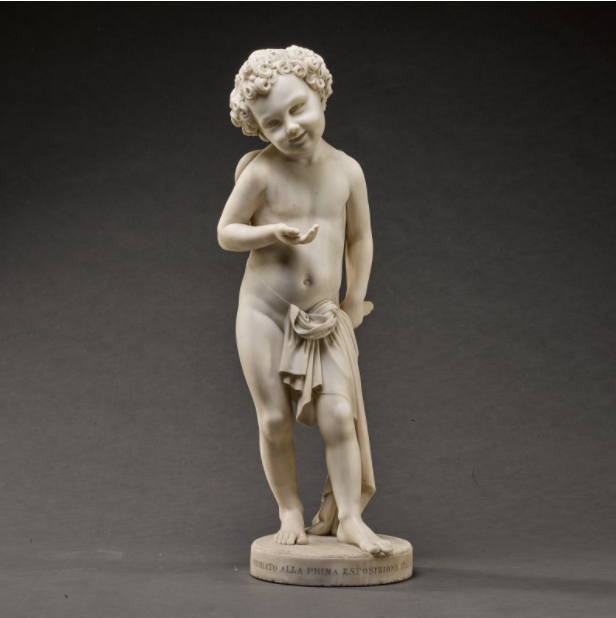
Amor Mendicante (Cupid Begging), 1861, Mougins Museum of Classical Art

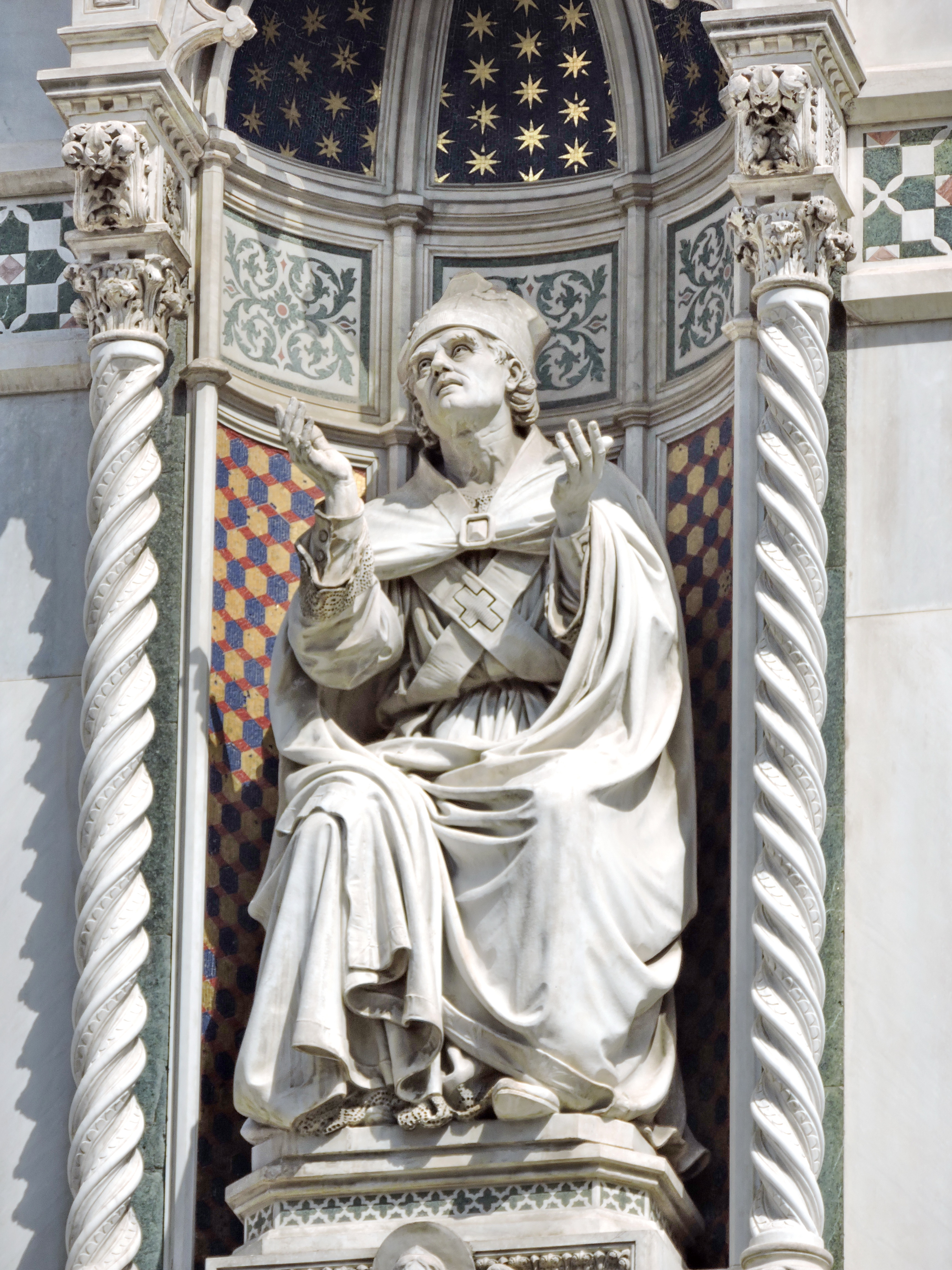
Statue of Bishop Agostino Tinacci on the façade of Santa Maria del Fiore, in Florence

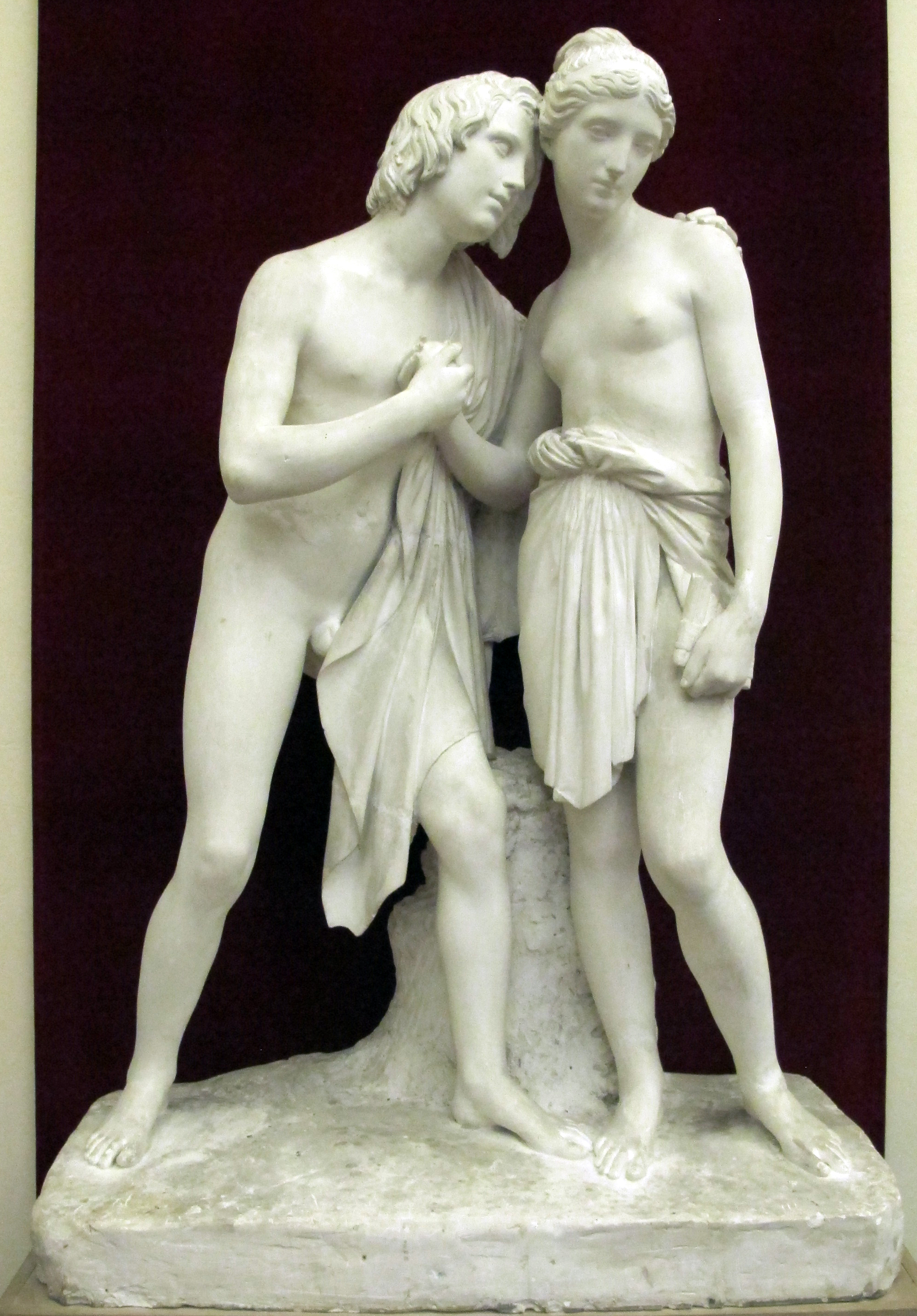
Daphnis and Chloe, Galleria dell'Accademia, Florence

== Bibliography ==
- Neri Arnoldi, Francesco (1974). "CAMBI, Ulisse". Dizionario Biografico degli Italiani (in Italian). Vol. 17: Calvart–Canefri. Rome: Istituto dell'Enciclopedia Italiana. ISBN 978-88-12-00032-6.
