= Leonardo Bistolfi =

Italian sculptor (1859–1933)

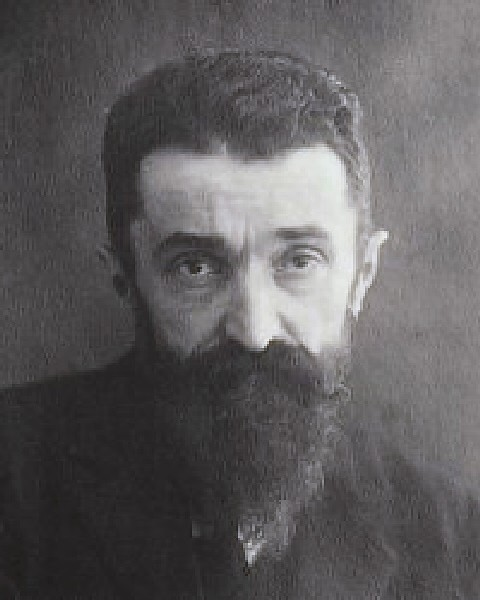
- Born: 14 March 1859; Casale Monferrato, Kingdom of Sardinia
- Died: 2 September 1933 (aged 74); La Loggia, Kingdom of Italy
- Education: Accademia di Belle Arti di Brera
- Known for: Sculpture
- Movement: Symbolism; Stile Liberty

Signature
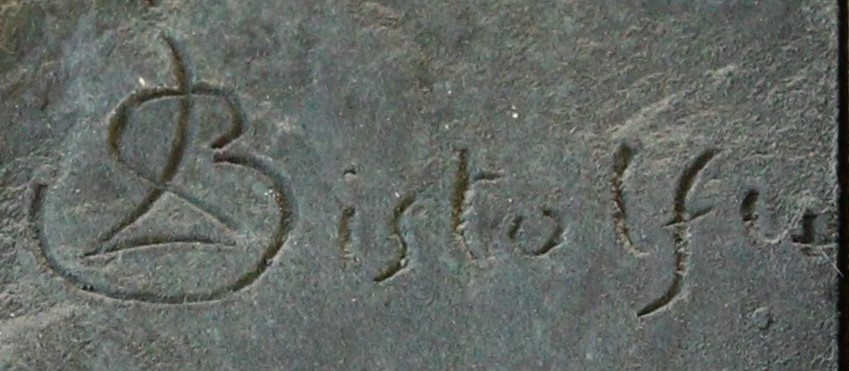

Leonardo Bistolfi (14 March 1859 – 2 September 1933) was an Italian sculptor and an important exponent of Italian Symbolism.

== Biography ==
=== Early life and education ===
Bistolfi was born in Casale Monferrato in Piedmont, north-west Italy, to Giovanni Bistolfi, a sculptor in wood, and to Angela Amisano. Giovanni died at the age of 26 years when Leonardo was still a boy. In 1876 he enrolled in the Brera Art Academy in Milan, where his teacher was Giosuè Argenti. In 1880 he studied under Odoardo Tabacchi at the Accademia Albertina in Turin.

=== Early work ===
His first works, executed between 1880 and 1885, show the influence of the Milanese Scapigliatura movement. These first works include Le lavandaie (The Washerwomen), Tramonto (Sunset), Vespero ('Evening'), Boaro (Cattle-hand), Gli amanti (The Lovers). The work of Gli Amanti was rejected from a Turin Promotrice circa 1880, bringing him either notoriety or fame.

In 1882 he sculpted L'Angelo della morte ('The Angel of Death') for the Brayda tomb in the Turin cemetery known as the Cimitero Monumentale di Torino. He produced a number of prominent works as funeral monuments, including, in 1889, La Sfinge (The Sphinx) for the funeral monument of the Pansa family in Cuneo; in 1895 La Bellezza della Morte (The Beauty of Death) for the engineer Sebastiano Grandis at Borgo San Dalmazzo; and in 1896 La Spose della Morte (The Wife of Death) at Frascarole Lomellina. Bistolfi's idealized and increasingly graphic female figures for these tombs have their origin in the Pre-Raphaelite style popularized in mid-19th-century England.

In the early 1890s Bistolfi was made an honorary member of the Accademia Albertina and became secretary of the Circolo degli Artisti ('Artists' Circle'). In 1893 he married Maria Gusberti.

=== Symbolist period ===
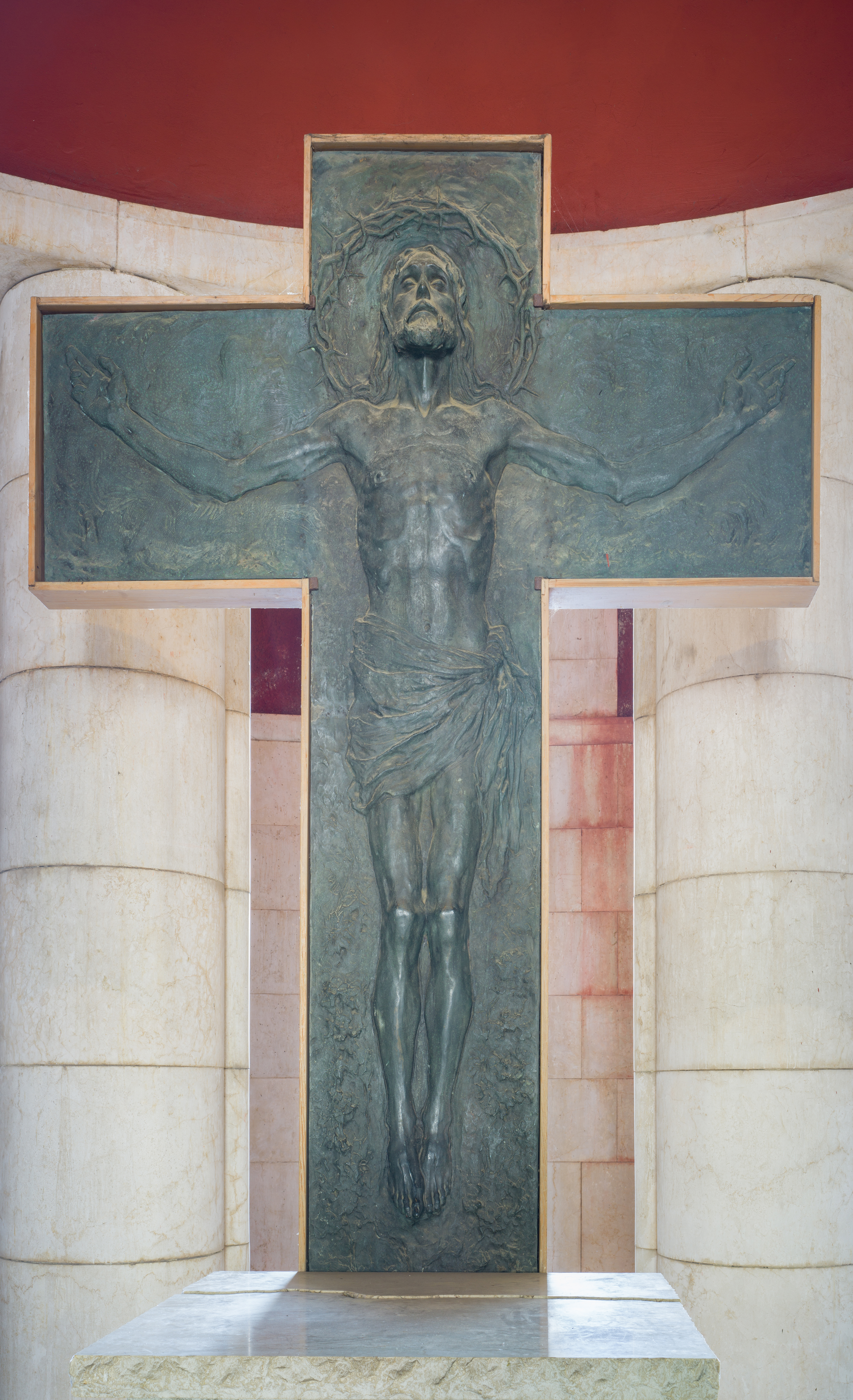
Bronze crucifix by Leonardo Bistolfi in the Mausoleum in the Vittoriale degli Italiani on Lake Garda.

As a faithful follower of William Morris's ideas on the arts, crafts and society, Bistolfi took part in reforming Italian art according to the new aesthetic canons of the Art Nouveau style and was among the organizers of the Mostra Internazionale di Arte Decorativa Moderna held in Turin in 1902. Together with Davide Calandra, Enrico Thovez and others he was also a founder-member of the periodical L’arte decorativa moderna (published in Turin), whose contributors vigorously supported Art Nouveau and showed themselves to be well informed about the modern movement elsewhere in Europe. Bistolfi's leading position was recognized in 1905, with the first one-man exhibition devoted to an Italian sculptor to be held at the Venice Biennale.

By this time his work had begun to reveal a renewed attention to the human figure and his return to a more traditional type, though he never abandoned his innate decorative sense or linear bias. This new direction in his work was largely under the influence of Auguste Rodin, whose works Bistolfi had seen at the early Venice Biennale exhibitions, but it was also in response to the renewed interest in Renaissance artists, notably Michelangelo, which characterized Italian figurative art from 1895.

During this phase Bistolfi produced a number of significant monumental groups which still betrayed his Symbolist roots. Thus the individuals being commemorated are not represented in the form of a portrait sculpture in the round but are relegated to an appearance in a relief medallion on the side of the tomb, while the dominating figure above it is an idealized or allegorical female. These features can be seen in numerous works, including the gigantic group in gilded bronze, the Sacrifice, for the monument to Victor Emmanuel II (1907; Rome, Piazza Venezia) and the marble monument to Camillo Benso, Count of Cavour (1913; Bergamo).

After 1905 Symbolist imagery, though not always understood, became more widespread in Italy through the work of Bistolfi's many pupils and imitators, who dominated the fields of civic and memorial sculpture until the 1920s. There was criticism of his work, however, notably from the Futurists, who accused him of producing works that were excessively decorative and lacking in form. This was at a time when Bistolfi's participation in various juries and commissions provided him with considerable influence in matters of official sculpture.

In 1906 he produced a monument to the painter Giovanni Segantini La bellezza liberata dalla materia ('Beauty liberated from matter') known also as L'alpe ('the Alp'), which is conserved at the Galleria Nazionale d'Arte Moderna in Rome. The Italian 20 Centesimi coin issued from 1908 to 1935, often called "Libertà Librata" (Flying Liberty), was designed by Bistolfi.

While continuing to work on many funerary monuments and public sculptures, among which is the marble relief monument to Giosuè Carducci (1908–26; Bologna, Piazza Carducci) and the bronze equestrian monument to Giuseppe Garibaldi (1912–28; Savona, Piazzale dell’Eroe dei Due Mondi), with the end of World War I Bistolfi was also active as a maker of monuments – particularly in Piemont – to those killed in the course of the war. This work would have culminated in his ambitious monument To the Fallen for Turin, which he began in 1926, but the project was never completed.

=== Later career ===
Towards the end of his life Bistolfi was also active as a landscape painter in oils in the style of Antonio Fontanesi (examples in Turin, priv. col.); he continued to write articles on art and took up writing poetry as well. His sculptural works in the 1920s include the seated bronze and marble monument to Cesare Lombroso (1922) in the Giardino di San Giorgio in Verona and that To the Fallen (1928; Casale Monferrato), a marble exedra with caryatids enclosing the bronze figure of an infantryman, several steps below which stands the artist's bronze of Spring. In 1921, his Monument to Antonio Fontanesi was erected in the Parco del Populo in Reggio Emilia. In 1923 he was made a senator by the King of Italy. Bistolfi died at La Loggia, in the province of Turin, on 2 September 1933. The bust in bronze of Guido Gozzano set in a marble monument in the grounds of a chapel (Agliè, Sant'Anna), which Bistolfi had begun in 1926, was completed after his death by G. Giorgis, a one-time pupil.

Bistolfi's work is exhibited at La Loggia, at the Musée d'Orsay in Paris, at The National Museum of Western Art in Tokyo, and at the Turin Civic Gallery of Modern and Contemporary Art in Turin. The largest collection, however, is at the Gipsoteca "Leonardo Bistolfi" in Casale Monferrato, where more than 170 of his works are on display in five rooms. These include drawings and sketches as well as works and bozzetti in terracotta, plasticine, and gesso and some sculptures in marble and bronze.

== Gallery ==
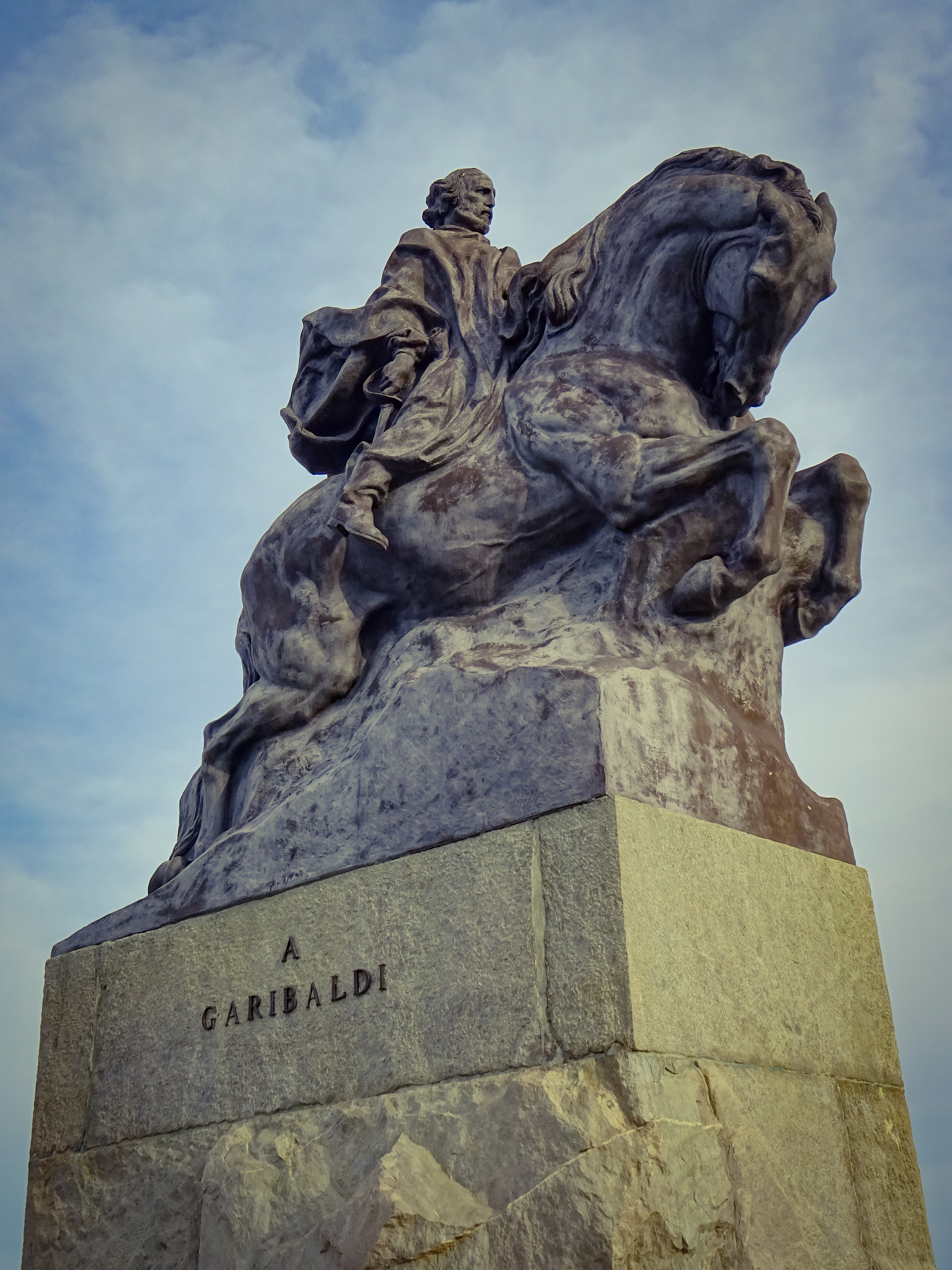
Equestrian monument to Giuseppe Garibaldi (1912–28), Savona, Piazzale dell’Eroe dei Due Mondi

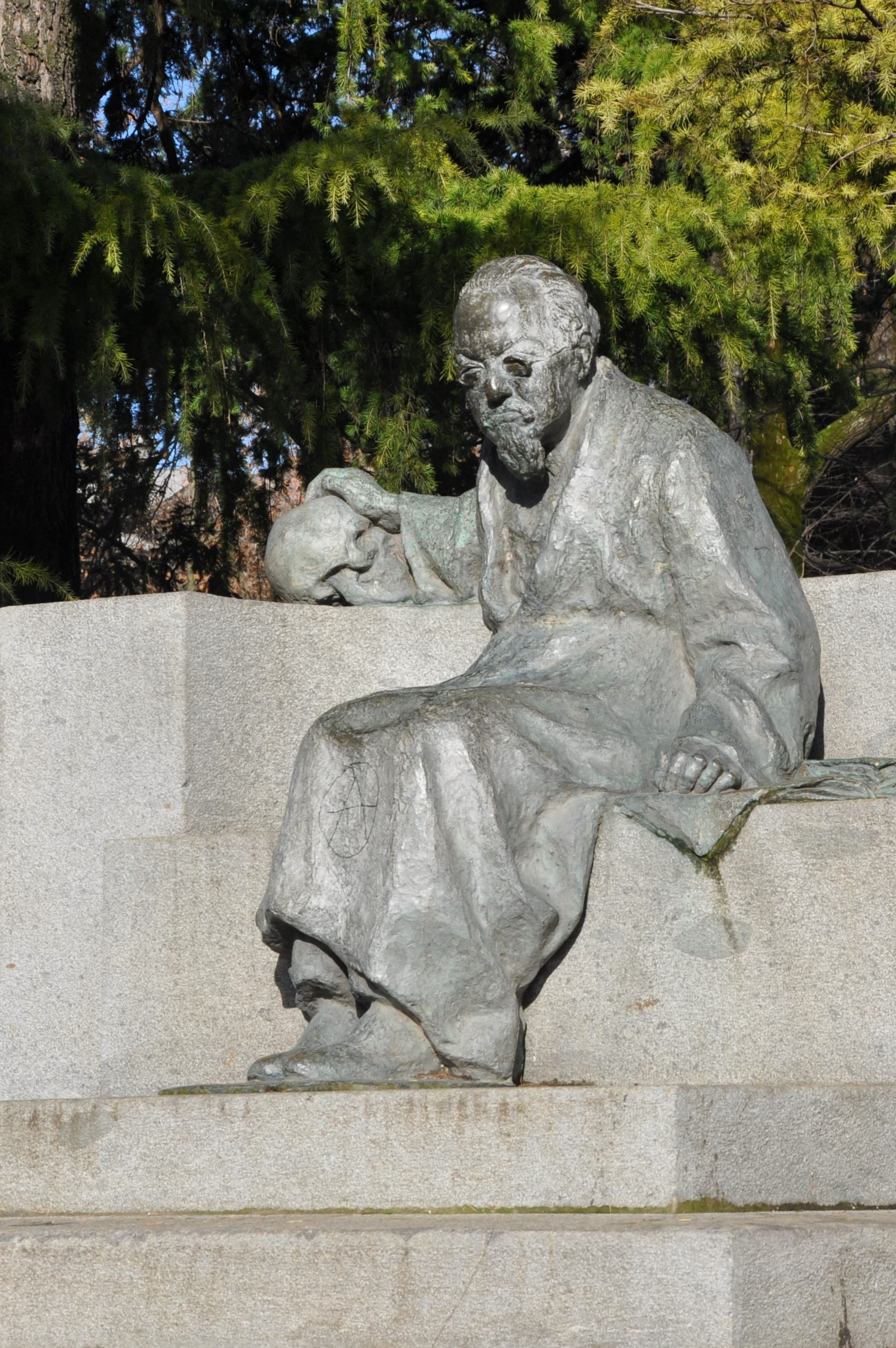
Monument to Cesare Lombroso (1922) in the Giardino di San Giorgio in Verona

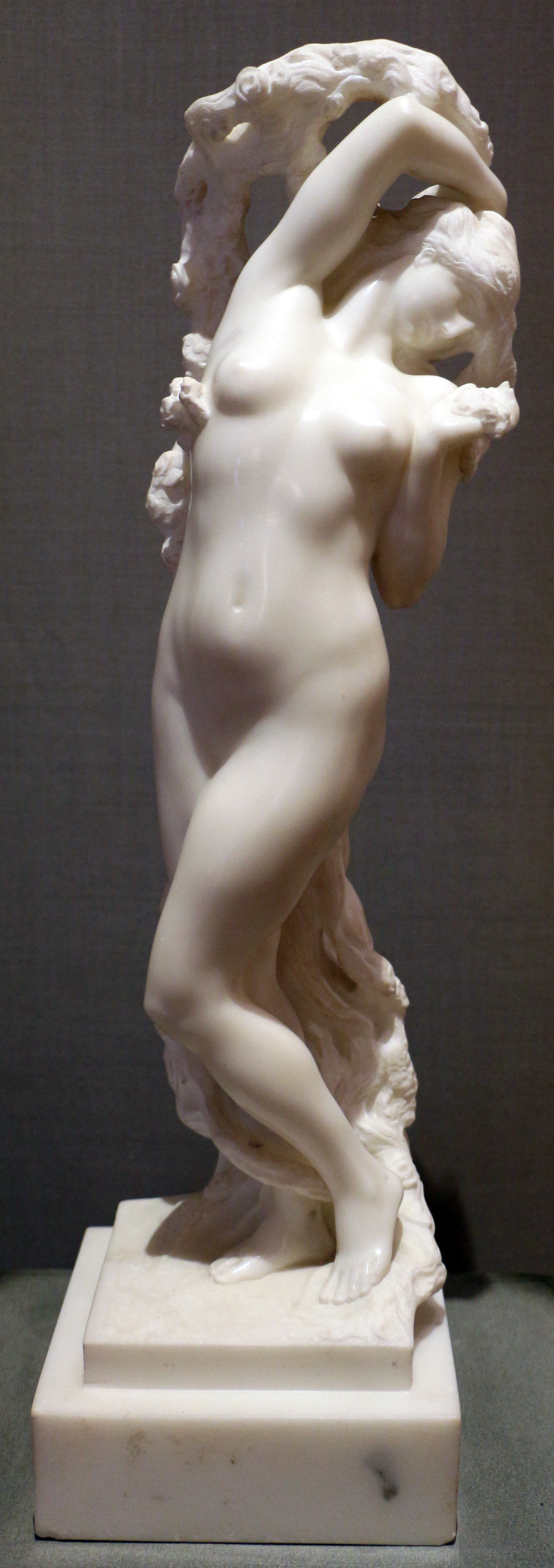
Il Profumo, c. 1917, Gipsoteca "Leonardo Bistolfi", Casale Monferrato

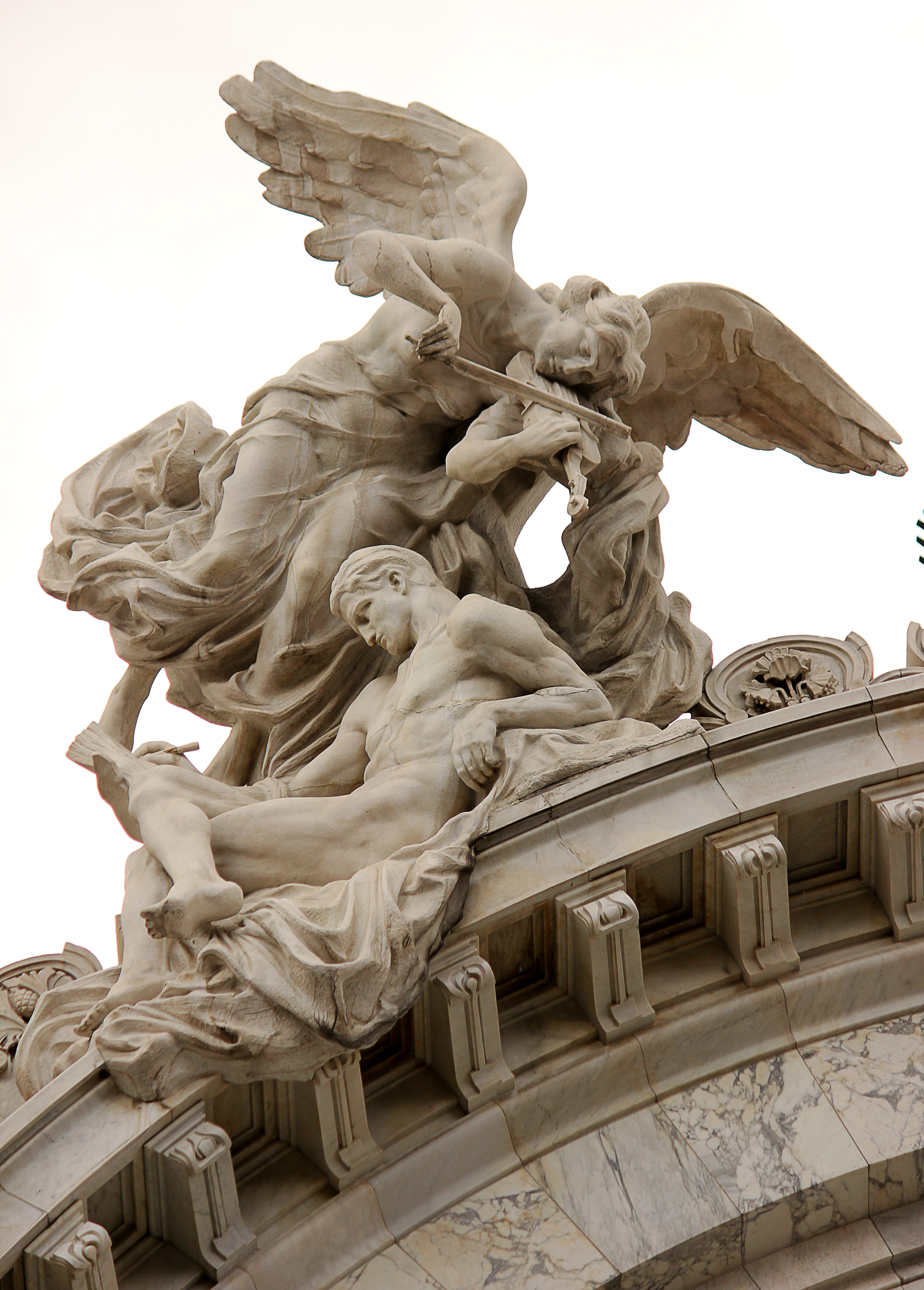
The music, c. 1900, Mexico City, Palacio de Bellas Artes

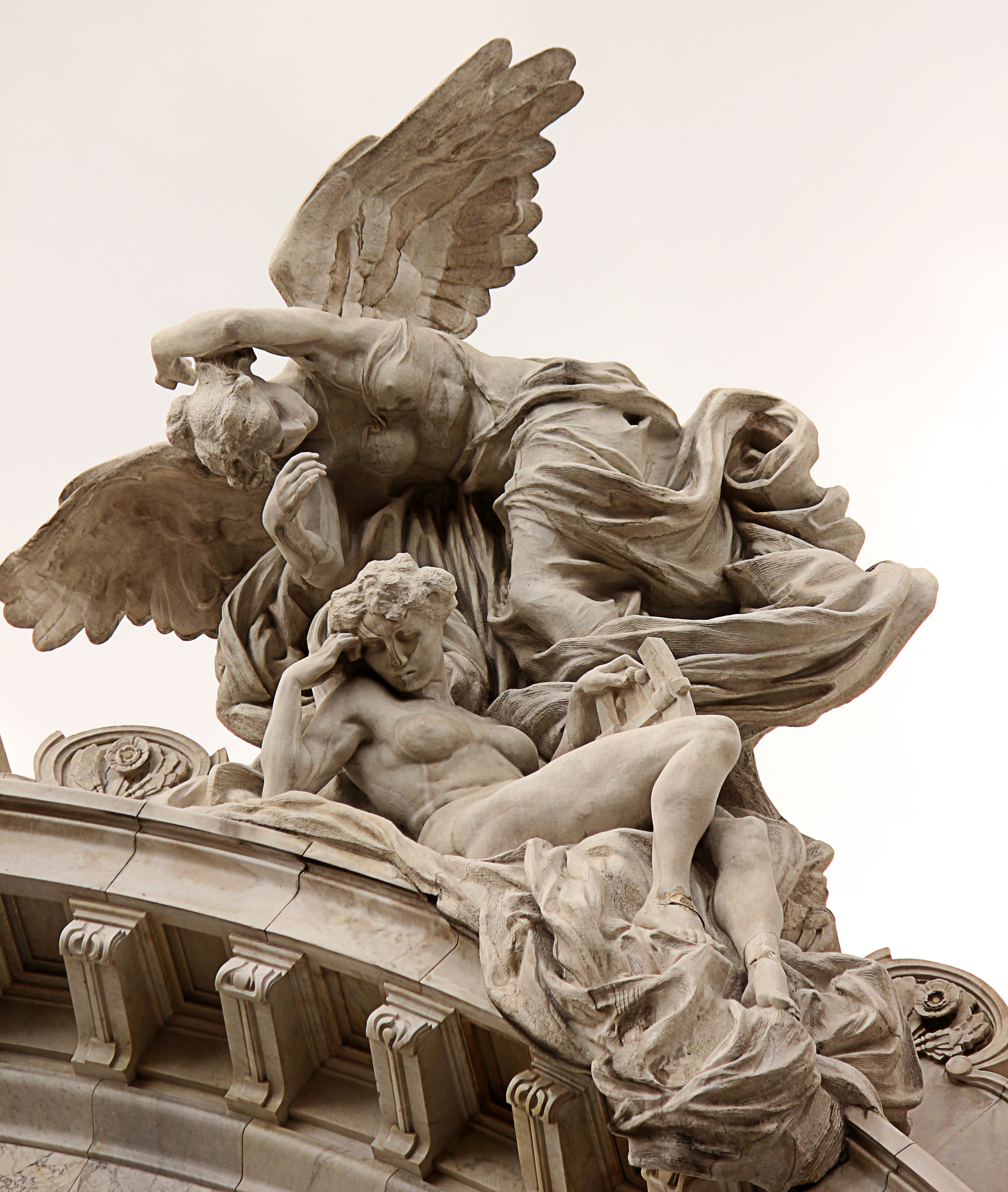
The inspiration, c. 1900, Mexico City, Palacio de Bellas Artes

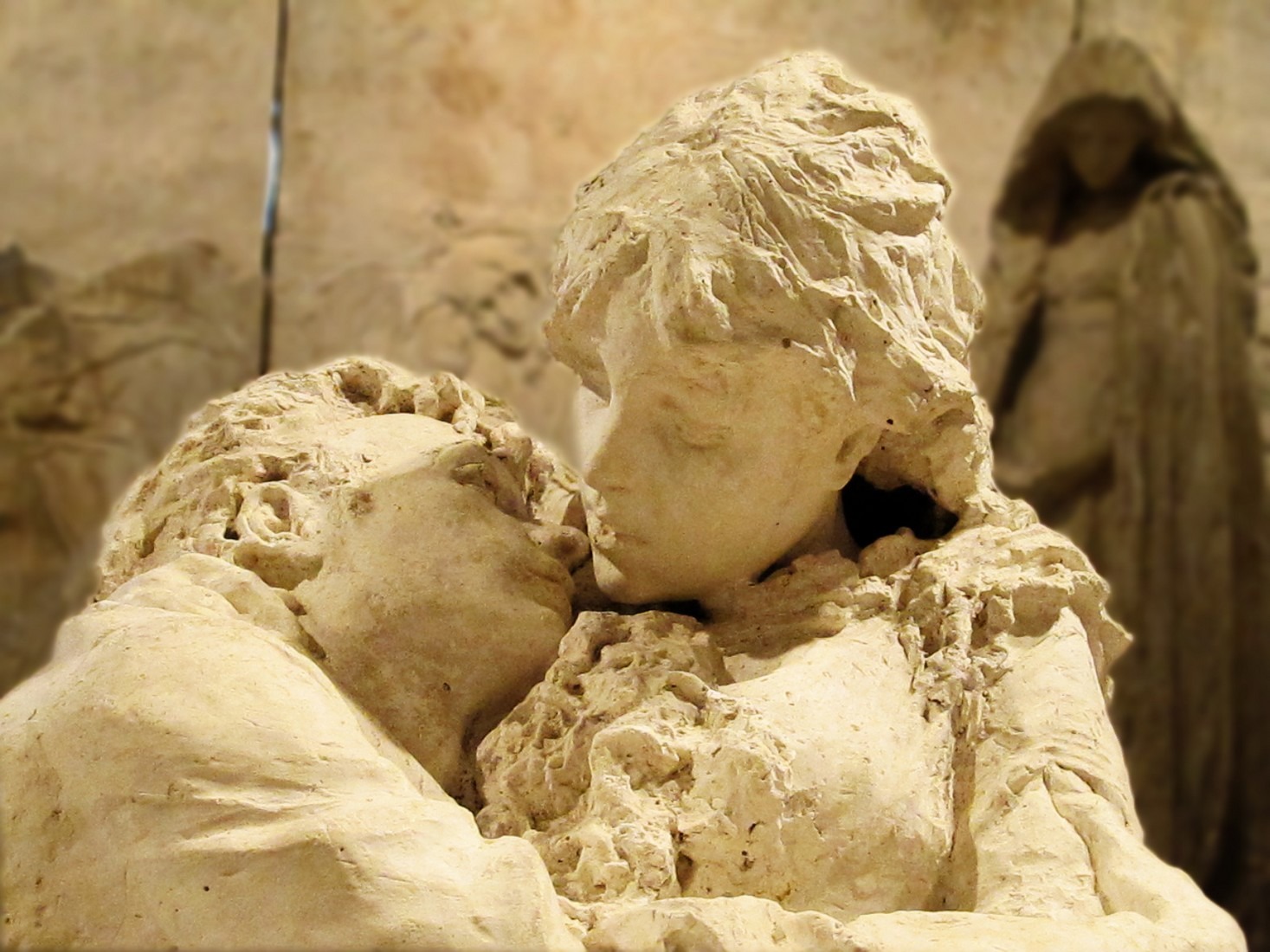
The Lovers, c. 1917, Gipsoteca "Leonardo Bistolfi", Casale Monferrato

== Bibliography ==
- Zimmern, Helen (1914). The Italy of the Italians. New York: C. Scribner's Sons. hdl:2027/yale.39002052242790.
