= Ragusan =

Ragusan may refer to:

- citizen of the Republic of Ragusa
- person from any other place called Ragusa

== See also ==
- List of Ragusans
