= Vincenzo Ragusa =

Italian sculptor

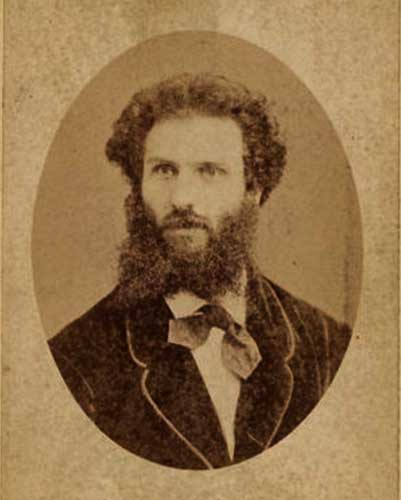
- Vincenzo Ragusa
- Born: 8 July 1841; Palermo, Kingdom of the Two Sicilies
- Died: 13 March 1927 (aged 85); Palermo, Italy
- Known for: sculpture

Vincenzo Ragusa (8 July 1841 – 13 March 1927) was an Italian sculptor who lived in Meiji period Japan from 1876–1882. He introduced European techniques in bronze casting, and new methods of modeling in wood, clay, plaster and wire armatures which exerted a significant role in the development of the modern Japanese sculptural arts.

== Background ==
In 1876, the Technical Fine Arts School (Kobu Bijutsu Gakko, later part of the University of Technology and later the Tokyo Institute of Technology), an art school of painting and sculpture, was founded in Tokyo under the supervision of the Ministry of Industry. This was the first governmental art school founded in Japan. Special emphasis was placed on sculptural art, as the number of applicants was far less than that for painting. With the waning popularity of Buddhism in the early Meiji period, traditional sculptural art had fallen into disfavor, and was surviving in minor arts such as architectural ornament, noh-masks, dolls, netsuke, and ivory-work.

Upon recommendation of the Italian Ambassador in Tokyo, Alessandro Fe' d'Ostiani, the Meiji government contracted three Italian artists as foreign advisors: Vincenzo Ragusa (1841–1927) for sculpture, Antonio Fontanesi (1818–1882) for drawing and Giovanni Cappelletti (1843-1887) for the preparatory course. These individuals greatly influenced the development of modern Japanese art and architecture through the next several decades. The acceptance of art teachers from Italy alone was part of an unofficial government policy that also involved taking military advice from France, industrial advice from Great Britain, agricultural advice from the United States, and legal/medical advice from Germany.

== Biography ==
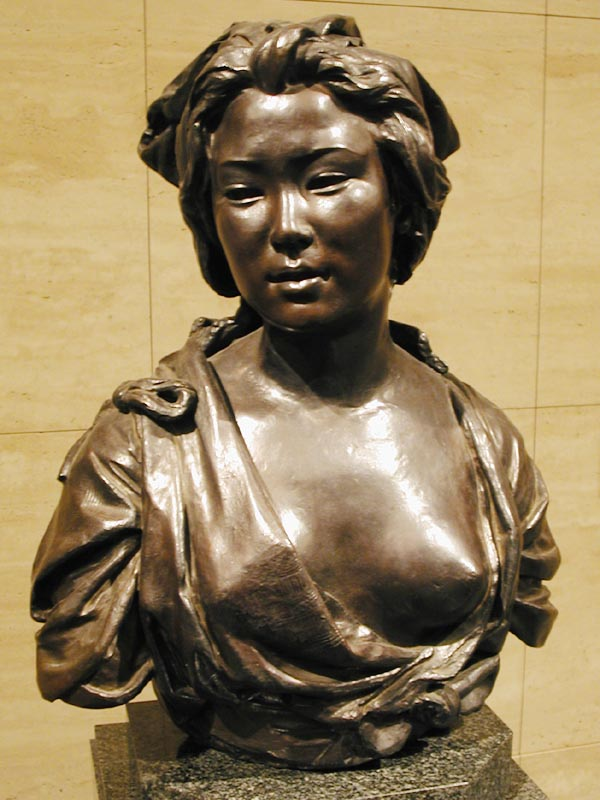
Japanese Woman by Ragusa, 1881, at Tokyo National Museum

=== Early life ===
Ragusa was born outside of Palermo, Sicily in 1841 to a family of modest social background and means. He studied drawing and ivory-carving under Salvatore Lo Forte; however, his career was interrupted by military service during the Unification of Italy, and he served in the Expedition of the Thousand in 1860 under the command of Nino Bixio. He later fought at the Battle of Volturno. After he resumed his artistic career, he won the highest prize at the art exhibition held at the Academy of Fine Arts of Brera in Milan in 1872 and in 1875 he received an honorary degree. In 1876, when a competitive exhibition was held to choose a sculptor to be sent to Japan, Ragusa was the winner.

=== Career in Japan ===
Ragusa moved to Japan in November 1876, and lectured in French which was interpreted by an official provided by the Foreign Ministry. The curricula at the Technical Fine Arts School consisted of perspective drawing, copying of paintings and making plaster models, still-life and life. His students included Takeuchi Kyuichi. He also received a teaching appointment at the School of Industrial Art in Yokohama.

Ragusa also had his own studio in his residence in Mita, Tokyo, and produced many portrait sculptures of notable people, actors and common people during his seven years in Japan. In recognition of his services, Ragusa was received in audience by Emperor Meiji in February 1879.

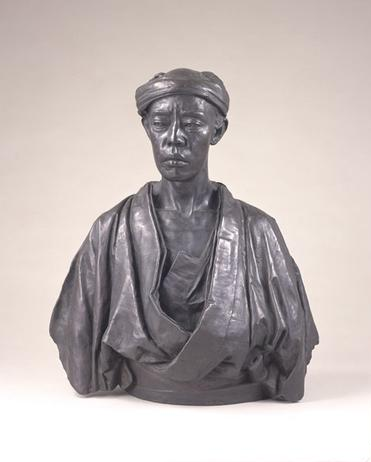
Japanese Actor by Vincenzo Ragusa, University Museum of the Tokyo National University of Fine Arts and Music

Ragusa renewed his contract in 1879 for a second six-year term, but the Technical Fine Art School closed in January 1883 due to financial difficulties and a strengthening of public opinion towards preservation of Japanese traditional culture. Ragusa left Japan in August 1882, taking with him his large collection of Japanese and Chinese art; this collection is now stored in the Pigorini National Museum of Prehistory and Ethnography in Rome. He was honored with the Order of the Rising Sun (Fifth Class) in June 1884.

=== Later life ===
When Ragusa returned to Italy, he was joined by a Japanese lacquer artist named Kiyohara Einosuke, Einosuke's wife (who was skilled in embroidery) and their daughter Kiyohara Tama.

Upon his return to Italy, Ragusa opened the Scuola Superiore d'Arte Applicata in Palermo, and employed Kiyohara and his wife as instructors in an attempt to introduce Japanese lacquer techniques to Italian art students. Eventually difficulties in obtaining the necessary raw materials put a halt on the program, and Kiyohara and his wife returned to Japan after six years. Their daughter elected to stay and married Ragusa later in 1889. She adopted the name of Mrs. Eleonora Ragusa.

In 1892 Ragusa sculpted the Monument to Giuseppe Garibaldi in Palermo: the bronze casting was made in Rome by Alessandro Nelli.

Ragusa died in Palermo in 1927 at the age of 86. In October 1933, his widow returned to Japan, after staying more than half a century in Italy. She died in 1939.

== Artistic legacy ==
Sixteen of Ragusa's works were given to the Imperial Art School in Tokyo by Kiyohara Tama on her return to Japan in 1933. They are kept in the University Art Museum of the Tokyo National University of Fine Arts and Music. Other works, including a "Statue of Napoleon I" which was made at the order of the Imperial family, remain in the Imperial Household. Although his works rarely bear a signature or date, the portrait statue "Miss Tama Kiyohara" is known with certainty to be dated 1878, as the sitter was seventeen years old at the time.

== See also ==
- Oyatoi gaikokujin
- Kiyohara Tama
- Edoardo Chiossone
- Antonio Fontanesi
