= La Loggia =

La Loggia La Lògia (Piedmontese)
- Comune
- Comune di La Loggia
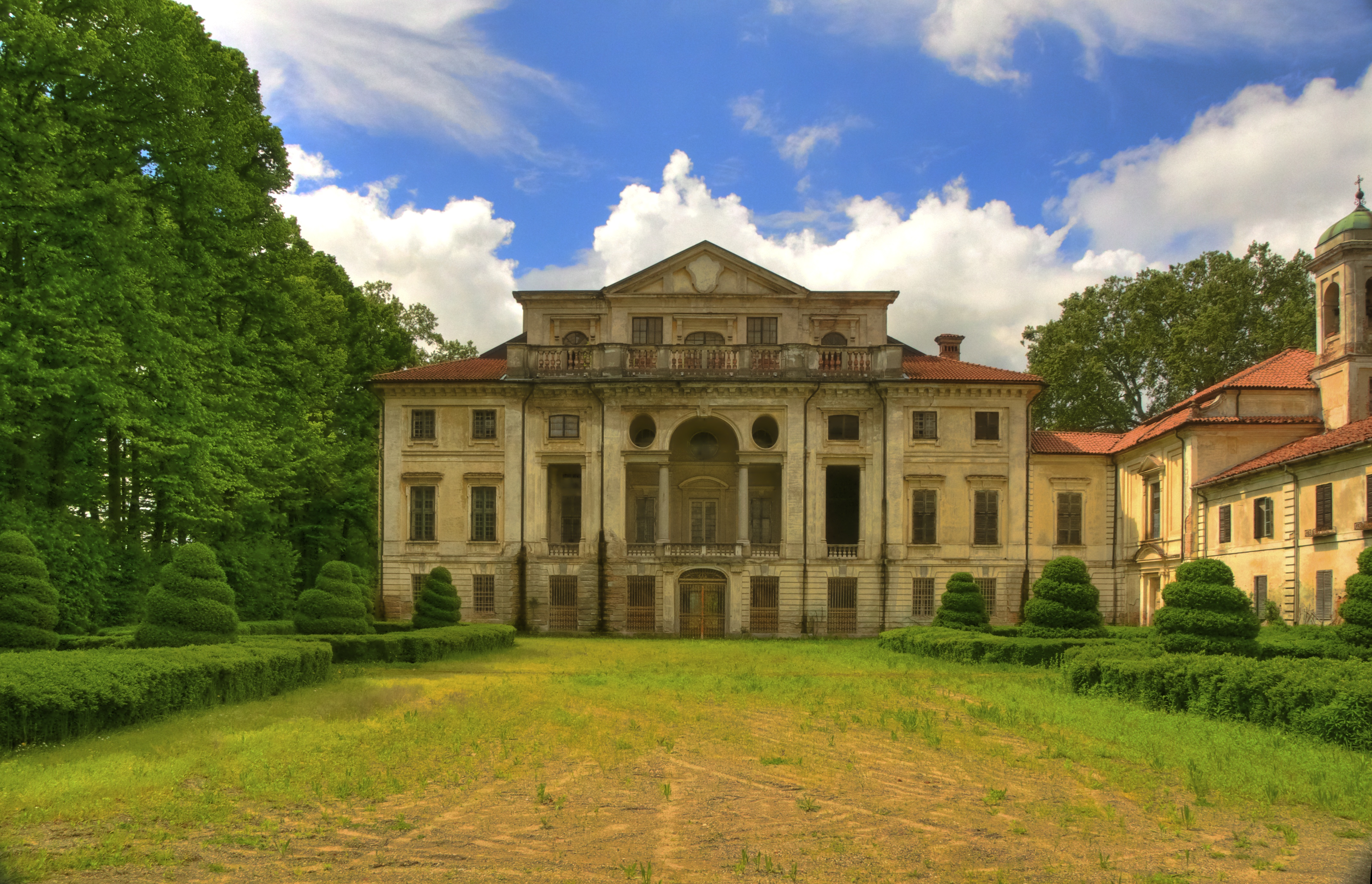

- Coat of arms

- Location within Italy Location within Piedmont
- Coordinates: 44°58′N 7°40′E
- Country: Italy
- Region: Piedmont
- Metropolitan city: Turin (TO)
- Frazioni: Baraudina, Cascina Madonna Degli Olmi, Sabbioni, Tetti Griffa, Tetti Sagrini

Government
  - Mayor: Domenico Romano (Lista civica)

Area
  - Total: 12.8 km^{2} (4.9 sq mi)
- Elevation: 230 m (750 ft)

Population (1-1-2017)
  - Total: 8,856
  - Density: 692/km^{2} (1,790/sq mi)
- Demonym: Loggese(i)
- Time zone: UTC+1 (CET)
  - Summer (DST): UTC+2 (CEST)
- Postal code: 10040
- Dialing code: 011

La Loggia (Italian pronunciation: [la ˈlɔddʒa]; Piedmontese: La Lògia [la ˈlɔdʒa]) is a comune (municipality) in the Metropolitan City of Turin in the Italian region Piedmont, located about 11 kilometres (7 mi) south of Turin.
