= Enrico Thovez =

Italian painter

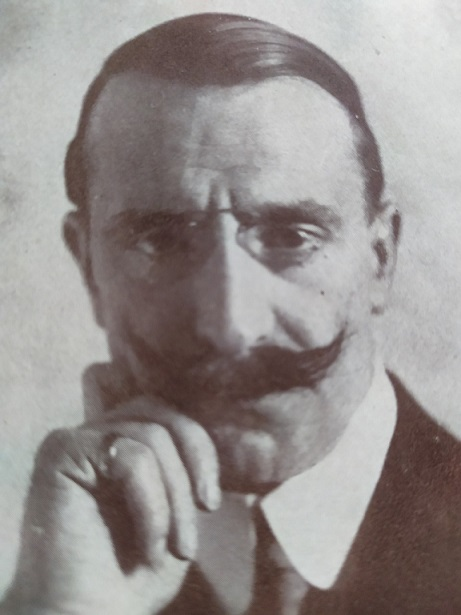

Enrico Thovez (10 November 1869 – 16 February 1925) was an Italian artist-polymath best known for his contributions as a poet and literary critic.

== Biography ==
Enrico Thovez was born in Turin less than ten years after unification. He was his parents' second son: his brother, Ettore, was five years older than he. Cesare Thovez, his father, was a hydraulics engineer of Savoyard provenance. His mother, Maria Angela Berlinguer, was from Sardinia, but could trace her own family back to Catalonia from where her ancestors had emigrated at the end of the sixteenth century. Thovez would later assert that he had inherited his love of poetry from his mother's aristocratic Spanish ancestors. Between 1881 and 1886 Thovez attended secondary schools, choosing the "technical" rather than the "gymnasium" route. He graduated from school successfully and moved on to enrol at the Sciences Faculty of the university. After just two months he abandoned these studies, however, in order to study the classics. By 1892 he had mastered Latin and Ancient Greek and acquired a thorough basic knowledge of classical literature. That was the year in which he obtained his "licenza liceale", the school completion qualification that opened the way to a university place as a student of classics. When he was around 20 he suffered from a nervous malady. This was cured by undertaking a trip to Florence, accompanied by his brother, Ettore. He enrolled again at the university, this time at the "Faculty of Letters", obtaining his degree in 1896. His graduation dissertation concerned "The Medieval Doric and the style of the Dipylon" ("Il Medioevo dorico e lo stile del Dipylon"): it was published six years later, in 1903.

- "For me the highest purpose is to make my existence a work of poetry: this is not a wish but a need. ... Something unstoppable in me pushes me beyond the normal limits."
- "Fare della mia esistenza un’opera di poesia è per me lo scopo più alto: anzi non è un desiderio, ma un bisogno. (…) Vi è in me qualcosa di incoercibile che m’incalza oltre dei limiti consueti."

Enrico Thovez, quoted in 1938

Thovez wrote his first known idylls in 1887 in loose hendecasyllables. They appeared in the "Gazzetta letteraria" ("Literary Gazette") in 1891 and 1892, and subsequently in anthologies. In 1895 he came to wider prominence with readers of "Gazzetta letteraria" when he started to denounce plagiarism of the poems of D'Annunzio, whose work at this stage was more widely appreciated in France than in Italy, chiefly on account of some superb translations produced by Georges Hérelle. It did indeed appear that it was the francophone poems that were being used by then plagiarist(s) who were then translating the works back into Italian and passing them off for publication as original pieces. Having established his credentials within the literary establishment, Enrico Thovez now became a regular contributor on literary topics to several mass circulation daily newspapers, including the Gazzetta del Popolo (Turin), the Corriere della Sera (Milan) and Il Resto del Carlino (Bologna). He did not restrict himself to literature, but also contributed extensively on the visual arts and on costumery. He joined the staff of La Stampa (Turin) as a contributing editor in 1904 or 1905. His contributions were published under the pseudonym "Simplicissimus", which was a respectful reference to the German satirical magazine of that name.

In 1902, following an extended trip to Germany the previous year, Thovez teamed up with Leonardo Bistolfi, Giorgio Ceragioli, Enrico Reycend and Davide Calandra to establish the periodical magazine L'arte decorativa moderna, which was devoted to decorative arts. It was also in 1902 that he began working with the Senese periodical that became "Vita d'Arte".

In 1901 he transferred his poetic insights into his "Ritratto della madre" ("Painting of the Mother") which was exhibited by the "Società Promotrice delle Belle Arti" in Turin. Later that same year a Thovez painting was exhibited at the Venice Biennale. It shows the figure of a man, with the hills outside Turin in the background: the artist Felice Carena is believed to have posed for the painting, though it does not purport to be a portrait. Several sources indicate that there were actually two years in which Enrico Thovez exhibited one or more paintings at the Biennale. In addition, he served between 1913 and 1921 as the director of the Galleria Civica d’Arte Moderna e Contemporane di Torino ("... Civic Gallery of Modern and Contemporary Art").

Much of the poetry of Enrico Thovez was written during his adolescence. During his lifetime he was better known as a critic and commentator than as a poet. However, in May 1924 he took the opportunity of a stay on Giannutri to subject his 1887 work, "La casa degli avi" (loosely, "The house of the ancestors"), to what a biographer describes approvingly as a "careful lexical revision" ("... un’assennata revisione lessicale"), following which he had it republished. There are indications in sources that Thovez never enjoyed particularly robust health. Towards the end of his life he fell victim to a malignant cancer, from which on 25 February 1925 he died at the family home in the Torinese suburb of Moncalieri.

== Works ==
=== Poems of adolescence ===
The first known poems of Thovez date from 1887, after which he continued to be prolific as a poet throughout the 1890s, his works becoming progressively more ordered and structured through that time. Most surviving editions of his poetry are from the second edition, which appeared in 1924 and which incorporated significant further changes by the author. His choice of prosastic verse, achieved through the use of paired ottonari to reproduce a form of classical hexameter, avoids the comfortable musicality of conventionally rhythmic verse and substitutes an imposed urgency in the poetic content. In his (posthumously published) diary he writes, "It cheers me that I have reduced my poetry to a minimum of syllabic ligaments: I am persuaded that if I had written my poems in prose I would never have been taken seriously [as a writer] in this land of guitars and mandolins". He also writes that he is unable to "write anything unless I am profoundly moved by it ... this pocket-full of a few hundred verses ... which has cost me so many tears and so much torment ... I still cannot trust purely cerebral creations".

=== Literary criticism ===
"Il pastore, il gregge e la zampogna" ("The shepherd, the flock and the bagpipes") is a polemical analysis of the language of Italian poetry, in which only Dante Alighieri and Giacomo Leopardi emerge with their reputations spared from attack. More recent celebrity poets such as Giosuè Carducci and D'Annunzio are attacked for a perceived lack of originality. It is hard to decide whether the book, which itself runs to around 500 pages, is to be considered a piece of wide-ranging scholarly criticism or more as a work of art in its own right. It certainly caught the attention of the reading classes, and stirred up the admirers of Italy's contemporary poets.

Both the virtues and the limitations of the literary criticism produced by Thovez lie in the originating primacy that he ascribes to Greek lyric, and the theory, apparently unknown in Italy, of poetry as lyrical purity in the immediacy of its expression of poetic sentiment, without cultural or technical mediation. There is a ruthless analysis of the backwardness of contemporary Italian culture, at one time Arcadian, yet now academicized and aestheticized to a fault, reflecting the moral bankruptcy of the nation, without acknowledging that same backwardness which the problems of contemporary poetry have their origin. His own distinction between "poetry of form" and "poetry of content" invites the reply the "poetry of form" also has its own content: the poet's moral indifference, his inner emptiness and his underlying cynicism.

"Il pastore ..." is certainly an enjoyable read, set out clearly in lively and ironic prose. Although its publication scandalised some, there were others, such as Arturo Graf, who welcomed its message and delivery. Critics condemned it as the rant of a man disappointed and annoyed by the commercial failure of his own juvenile poetry, and his theses was increasingly marginalised by senior members of literary establishment. It should be remembered that as a prolific literary critic in major newspapers ever since then 1890s, Thovez himself was not universally loved by his fellow-writers.

== Output (selection) ==
- L'arte del comporre di Gabriele d'Annunzio (1896)
- Il poema dell'adolescenza, Torino, Streglio (1901)
- Il pastore, il gregge e la zampogna, Napoli, Ricciardi (1910)
- L'opera pittorica di Vittorio Avondo, Torino, Celanza (1912)
- Mimi dei moderni, Napoli, Ricciardi (1919)
- L'arco di Ulisse, Napoli, Ricciardi (1921)
- Il vangelo della pittura e altre cose d'arte, Torino, Lattes (1921)
- Poemi di amore e di morte, Milano, Treves (1922)
- Il viandante e la sua orma, Napoli, Ricciardi (1923)
- Il filo di Arianna, Milano, Corbaccio (1924)
- La ruota di Issione, Napoli, Ricciardi (1925)
- Scritti inediti (Il nuovo Faust o La trilogia di Tristano, Poemi in prosa, Prose poetiche, Soliloqui, Milano, Treves (posthumous: 1938)
- Diario e lettere inedite, Milano, Garzanti (posthumous: 1939)
