= Kiyohara Tama =

Japanese artist (1861–1939)

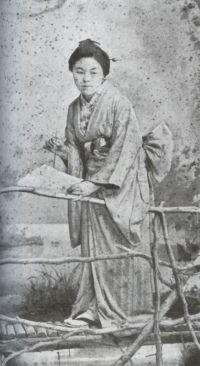
- Tama Kiyohara in Palermo (c. 1882–1883)
- Born: July 17, 1861; Edo, Japan
- Died: April 6, 1939 (aged 77); Tokyo, Japan
- Known for: Painting

Kiyohara Tama (清原玉) (1861 – 1939), also known as Kiyohara Otama (清原お玉) or O'Tama Chiovara, Eleonora Ragusa (エレオノーラ・ラグーザ), or Ragusa Tama (ラグーザ・玉) was a Japanese painter who spent most of her life in the Sicilian city of Palermo. Her maiden name was Kiyohara Tayo (清原多代).

== Biography ==
Kiyohara Tayo was the second daughter of Kiyohara Einosuke, intendant of Zōjō-ji temple in Shiba, Minato, Tokyo, Japan. She started seriously studying painting with a Japanese master even before entering elementary school. Her life suddenly changed when Sicilian sculptor Vincenzo Ragusa, for whom she had modeled when she was just 17, after spending six years in Japan as a sculpture professor, decided to go home in 1882 taking with him Kiyohara Einosuke, Kiyohara's wife and 21-year-old Tayo.

In Palermo, Ragusa opened the Scuola Superiore d'Arte Applicata, employing Kiyohara and his wife as instructors to introduce Japanese lacquer techniques to Italy, but difficulties in obtaining the necessary raw materials caused the school's closure, and Kiyohara and his wife returned to Japan after six years in Palermo. They left behind their daughter, who married Ragusa in 1889, and took the Italian name Eleonora.

Tama continued to be active in the arts and was nominated vice-principal of the art school which Vincenzo opened in Palermo. The school, called Museo Artistico Industriale, Scuole Officine, opened in 1884 with public funds in Palazzo Belvedere (Casa Benzo). He headed the men's section, she the women's section. The school still exists as Istituto Statale d'Arte di Palermo.

In Italy, Tama was admired for her works in watercolor, including still-lives with flowers, but also figures and landscapes. She won many prizes at exhibitions in the Casino of Fine Arts of Palermo. She also excelled in embroidery, winning a gold medal for her work at an exhibition in Rome.

After her husband's death in 1927, two Japanese newspapers, the Osaka Mainichi Shinbun and the Tokyo Nichinichi Shinbun, found out about her story and published a serialized novel about it, bringing Tama to fame in her homeland. By then she could barely speak Japanese anymore, but she decided to go back. After her return, she opened an atelier in Shiba Shinbori, where she died some years later. She is buried at her family temple, Chōgen-ji. Kiyohara was a painter of great skill, but most of the works she left in Japan were destroyed during World War II, while those left in Italy are still exhibited in various private collections.

According to her wishes, half of her ashes are in Japan, and half lie in Palermo next to her husband's grave.

== In popular culture ==
Tama features in the 2018 novel The Death of Noah Glass by Australian author Gail Jones, in which the eponymous character is accused of being involved in the theft and smuggling of a sculpture of Eleonora by Vincenzo Ragusa.
