= University of Ragusa =

University in Ragusa, Italy

- Università degli Studi di Catania
- Latin: Siciliae Studium Generale or "Siculorum Gymnasium"
- Type: State-supported
- Established: 1998
- Rector: Prof. Giacomo Pignataro
- Administrative staff: N/A
- Students: N/A
- Undergraduates: N/A
- Postgraduates: N/A
- Location: Ragusa and Ragusa Ibla, Italy
- Sports teams: N/A
- Affiliations: UNIMED
- Website: www.unirg.it/

The University of Ragusa (Italian: Università di Ragusa) is a university located in Ragusa and Ragusa Ibla, Italy, and founded in 1998. This university depends on Catania University and it is the most recent university in Sicily.

== Organization ==
=== Faculties ===
These are 2 faculties in which the university is divided into:

- Agricultural science
- Law
- Foreign languages
- Political science

=== History ===
The university was founded by the mayor Carmelo Arezzo (a lawyer himself) and the first faculty was that one of Law.
Lessons were held in Ragusa Ibla at the Presidio (Distretto Militare) and in Ragusa in the Episcopal see (Vescovado) auditorium.
Due to the 2008 financial crisis and the Euro area crisis, lessons started having serious problems to take place regularly. Given the dire straits and gloomy times students, professor and assistants (when not busy in looking for means to meet daily economical needs) meet informally at the Cesare Zipelli library in Ragusa Ibla.
