= Romolo Ubertalli =

Italian painter

Romolo Ubertalli (1871 – 14 February 1958) was an Italian landscape painter.

He was born in Mosso Santa Maria in the Piedmont, son of a factory owner. He was named Romolo to celebrate the annexation of Rome into Italy that occurred a few days prior to his birth. He initially studied law, but gravitated to painting under the tutelage of Carlo Follini. He often exhibited at the Promotrice of Turin. He also learned from Andrea Tavernier.
