= Antonio Fontanesi =

Italian painter (1818–1882)

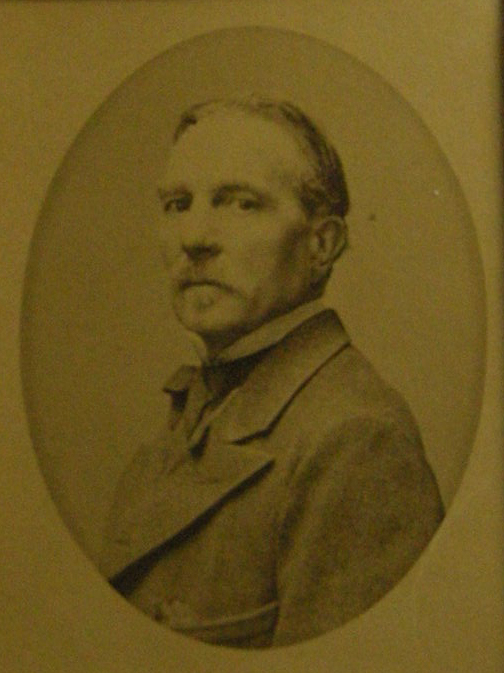
- Antonio Fontanesi
- Born: 23 February 1818; Reggio Emilia, Emilia-Romagna
- Died: 17 April 1882 (aged 64); Turin, Italy
- Occupation: artist

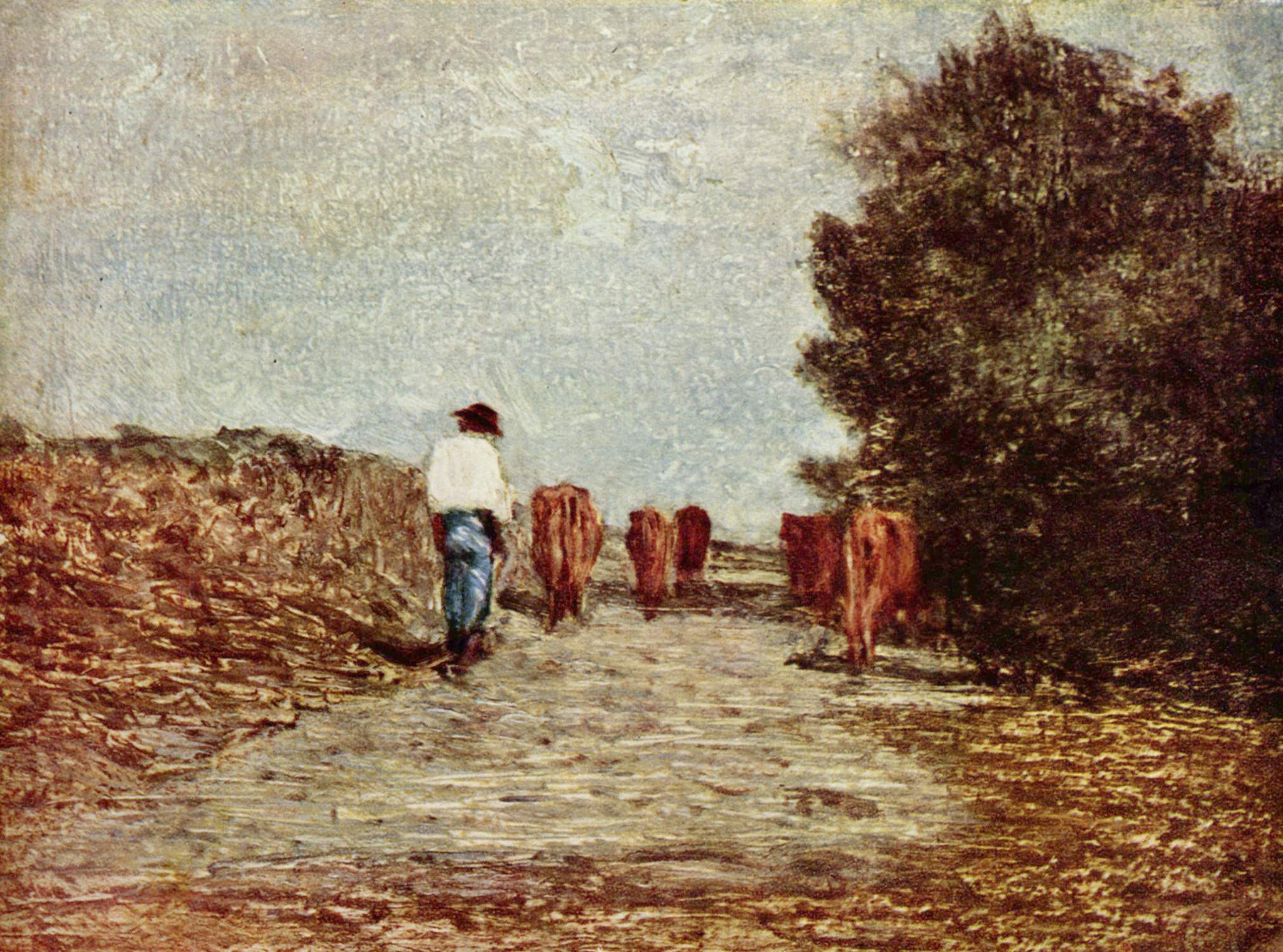
Ritorno dal pascolo (The Course to the Pasture), oil on wood, Galleria Sabauda

Antonio Fontanesi (23 February 1818 – 17 April 1882) was an Italian painter who lived in Meiji period Japan between 1876 and 1878. He introduced European oil painting techniques to Japan, and exerted a significant role in the development of modern Japanese yōga (Western style) painting. He is known for his works in the romantic style of the French Barbizon school.

== Early life ==
Fontanesi was born in Reggio Emilia, Emilia-Romagna, and trained with the landscape painters Prospero Minghetti and Vincenzo Carnevali. From 1841 to 1846 he made theatre sets and began painting landscapes.

In 1848, he joined a group of Garibaldian volunteers, that went to Milan to fight with the Manara Legion, against the Austrians. In 1859, he was again to briefly join Cavour's armed forces in Bologna.

In 1850, he moved to Geneva, where he stayed until 1865. His main area of interest was landscape painting, which he expanded on after visiting the 1855 Exposition Universelle in Paris. In 1863, he attempted to settle in London, but found few commissions or work. he completed a series of watercolors of paintings in the National Gallery. He returned to Florence, where he stayed with the fellow painter Cristiano Banti.

He participated in important artistic exhibitions, displaying his works in Lyon, Turin, Milan, Florence, Genoa and the Triennial Exhibition of Fine Art in Bologna. He was nominated professor at the Academy of Lucca, but moved to Turin when a chair as a landscape professor was created specially for him at the Accademia Albertina in Turin from 1869 to 1876. Among his pupils was Carlo Follini.

There are a number of monuments to Fontanesi in his native Reggio Emilia, including the Monument in Parco del Popolo.

== Career in Japan ==
In 1876, the Technical Fine Arts School (Kobu Bijutsu Gakko), (later part of the University of Technology, and later the Tokyo Institute of Technology), an art school of painting and sculpture was founded in Tokyo under the supervision of the Ministry of Industry. It was the first governmental art school founded in Japan.

Upon recommendation of the Italian minister to Tokyo, Count Alessandro Fè d'Ostiani, the Meiji government contracted three Italian artists as foreign advisors: Vincenzo Ragusa (1841–1927) for sculpture, Antonio Fontanesi for drawing and Giovanni Cappelletti (died 1885) for the preparatory course. The trio greatly influenced the development of Japanese art and architecture through the next several decades. The acceptance of teachers in art from Italy alone was based on the unofficial government policy of accepting military advice from France, industrial advice from Great Britain, agricultural advice from the United States, and legal and medical advice from Germany.

Fontanesi introduced the techniques of charcoal, crayon and oil paints to his Japanese students, who included Asai Chū and Yamamoto Hosui. He also taught western concepts of perspective, anatomy and sketching from life. His career in Japan was cut short by serious illness, which forced him to return to Italy in 1878.

== See also ==
- Oyatoi gaikokujin
- Edoardo Chiossone
- Vincenzo Ragusa
