= Art Nouveau in Turin =

Local implementation of a style of architecture and design

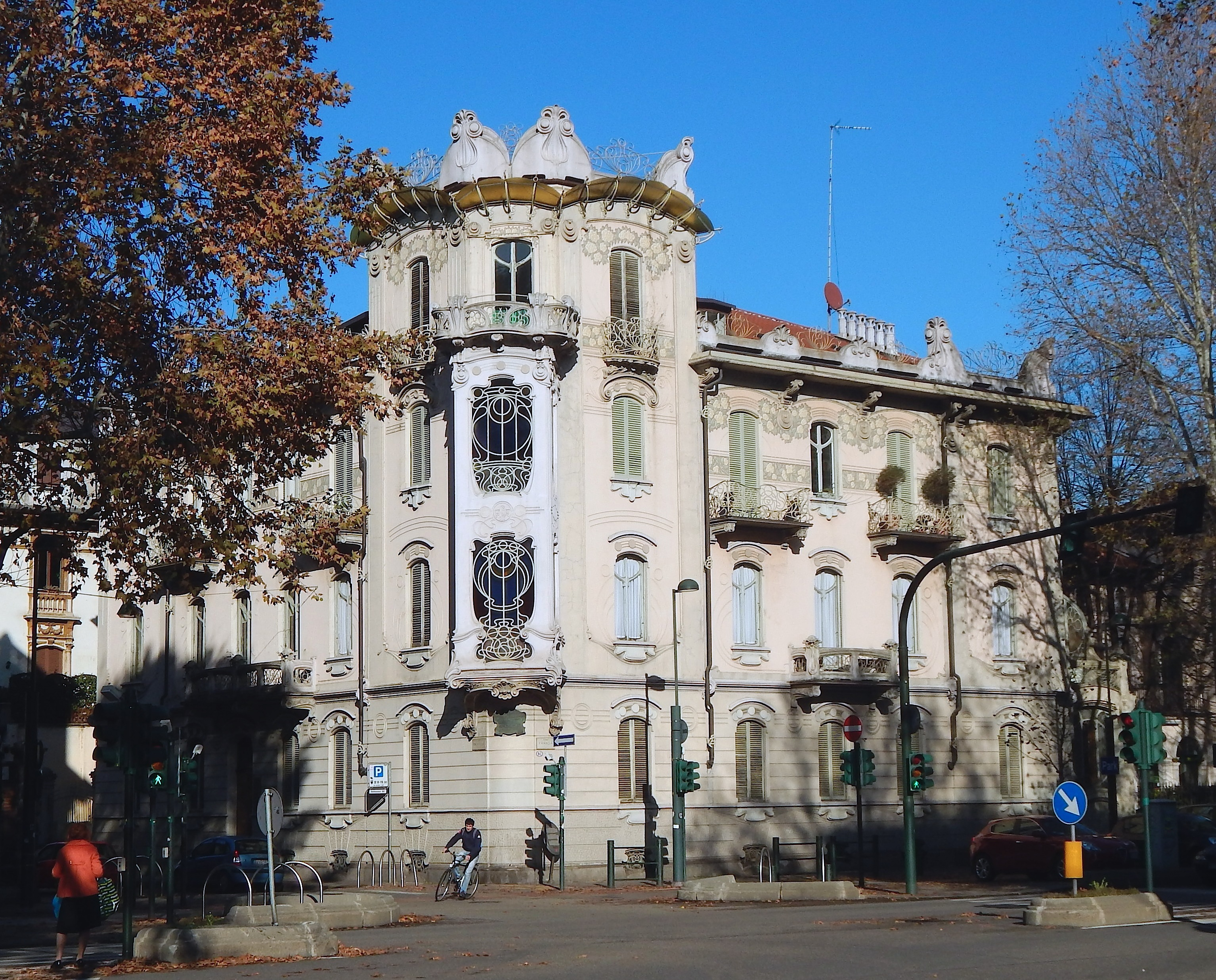
Pietro Fenoglio's famous Casa Fenoglio-Lafleur, an emblem of Turin's Art Nouveau style

Art Nouveau, in Turin, spread in the early twentieth century.

This new stylistic current involved various artistic disciplines including the applied arts and, predominantly, architecture. In the specific panorama of Turin, Art Nouveau was influenced, in its major works, by the important Parisian and Belgian schools, becoming one of the greatest Italian examples of this current, so much so as to establish Turin as one of the Italian capitals of the Art Nouveau style, not without also undergoing inevitable eclectic and Art Deco incursions.

Due to the success of this stylistic current and the type of buildings that arose in the first decades of the twentieth century, Turin became one of the landmarks of Italian Art Nouveau, often renamed "floral style," so much so that conspicuous architectural evidence of that period can still be perceived today.

== History and historical-artistic context ==
The transition from the 19th to the 20th century in Europe was marked by a fervent renewal of artistic expressions, strongly influenced by technical progress and the enthusiastic positivist exaltation of the important achievements of science. The evolutions of the artistic avant-garde at the end of the nineteenth century first involved the applied arts, taking on different names in different geographical areas: in the French-speaking area it took the name Art Nouveau, in Germany jugendstil, in Austria sezessionstil, modern style in Britain and modernismo in Spain.

In Italy, and particularly in Turin, the new current initially established itself as "new art," translating the term directly from French. In the overall and varied national panorama, this new current, which later also took on the name "floral style," never consolidated into a true Italian school of reference but established itself, albeit with a slight delay compared to the major European countries, experiencing its heyday in the first years of the twentieth century. In its first decade, in fact, one can speak of Art Nouveau, a term that eventually became more widely established in Italy and derived from the famous London warehouses of Arthur Lasenby Liberty, among the first to display and disseminate objects and prints of exotic taste that flaunted the sinuous forms typical of this new style.

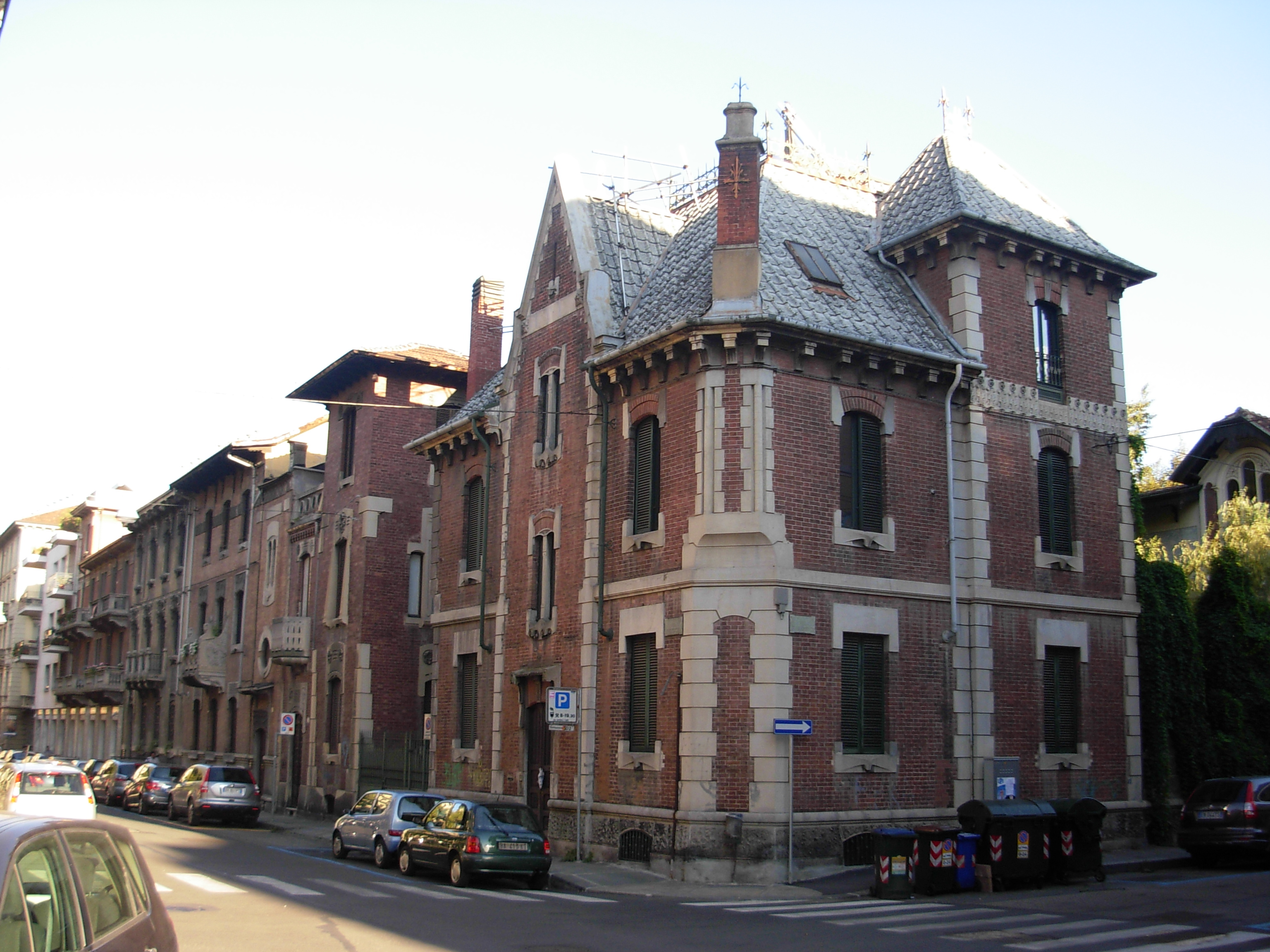
Building on Pietro Piffetti Street

Art Nouveau, therefore, found its greatest success in architecture, leaving posterity one of its most enduring testimonies. At the beginning of the 20th century, the upper middle class, by then definitively established as the hegemonic class of Italian society, found in Art Nouveau its own specific distinguishing element, that is, an opportunity to show its superiority and at the same time emphasize its detachment from the old aristocratic class and its neoclassical and baroque mansions. However, its innovative aspect was not only the opposition to neo-Gothic and eclecticism but also a greater consideration of the applied arts as an implicit strength, since Art Nouveau trusted, thanks in part to the growing development of technology, in a large-scale production of an art that in its emblematic beauty was accessible to the majority of the social fabric of the time; despite these premises, even in Turin this initial populist vocation of Art Nouveau waned; the ideal of a "socialism of beauty" evolved into a rich triumph of floral motifs, threadlike ribbing, bold metal decorations of clear phytomorphic inspiration but soon became only a privilege of the wealthier social classes. This new stylistic trend was facilitated by the presence of many Italian and especially English or Swiss industrialists such as: Abegg, Bich, Caffarel, Caratsch, Kind, Krupp, Leumann, Miller, Menier, Metzger, Remmert, and Scott, who contributed to that "international breath" and to the future industrial vocation of the Piedmontese capital, and who set up new and numerous works in the Piedmontese capital precisely in the years between the nineteenth and twentieth centuries.

As a result of this stylistic season, often considered "frivolous" and perhaps naively optimistic, the added value of technique and industry prevailed, just as "function" prevailed over "form," but modernity soon erupted into the horrors of the Great War, which, not only symbolically, decreed the end of the Art Nouveau season.

== Turin between the 19th and 20th centuries: Art Nouveau ==
Turin, while boasting an architectural landscape predominantly characterized by the Juvarra-esque connotation of the numerous noble palaces and Savoy residences, in the two decades between the 19th and 20th centuries allowed itself to be permeated by this new stylistic current.

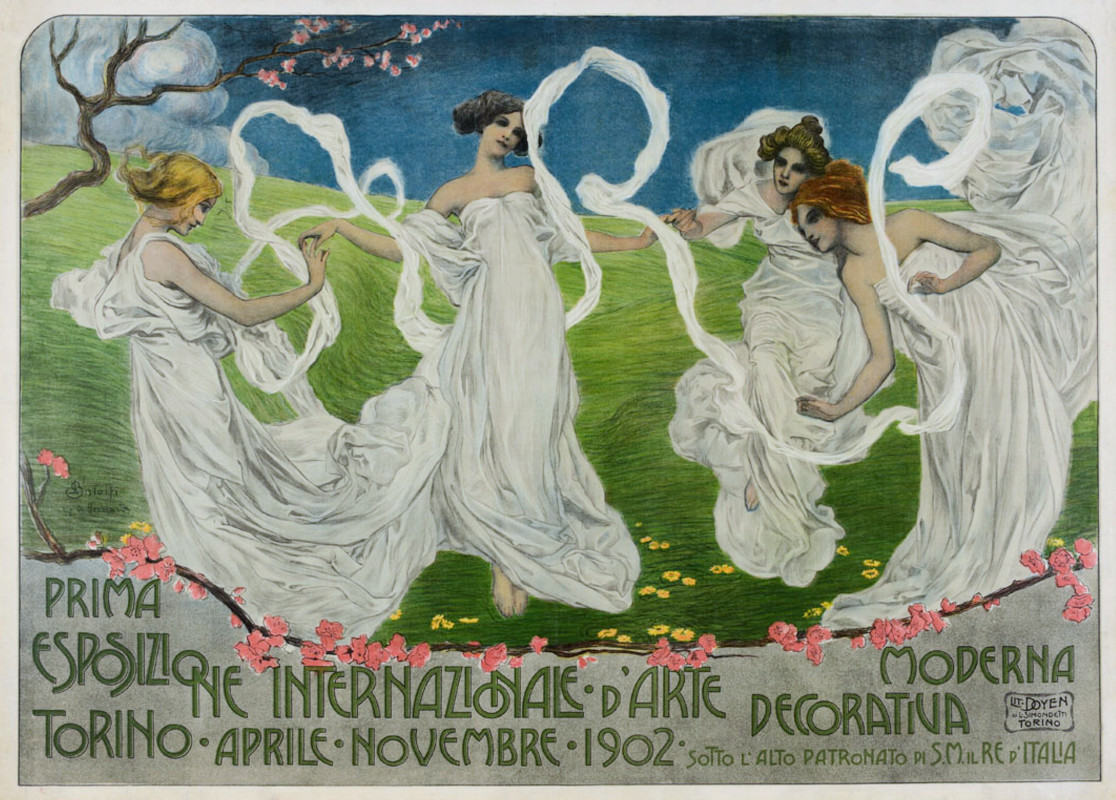
The poster for the 1902 International Exhibition of Modern Decorative Art made by Leonardo Bistolfi

Initially known as "new art" or, according to Turin journalist Emilio Thovez, "floral art," this new style astonished for being so "faithfully naturalistic and in substance distinctly decorative." Following the editions of the International Exhibition of Modern Decorative Art, Turin saw the growing proliferation of this new style in the predominantly architectural sphere, celebrating a kind of "renaissance of the decorative arts," making use of contributions from leading authors of the time such as Raimondo D'Aronco and the Turin-born Pietro Fenoglio, who made a name for himself through his fruitful activity as an engineer and who made Turin's Art Nouveau one of the most shining and coherent examples of the varied Italian architectural scene of the time.

A significant contribution also came from industry, which, involved in the forefront of the renewal process in the Piedmontese capital, played the role of privileged client but also of interlocutor able to offer the technique and solid support for the benefit of those workers necessary for the full affirmation of this new current in Turin. Decisive, to cite one example, was the work of the Turin-based Impresa Porcheddu, (Note: Its first location was in Piazza Cavour, later it moved to Corso Valentino 20, now Corso Guglielmo Marconi, and then established branches throughout Italy. G.A. Porcheddu (1911)) which, owing to the resourcefulness of its owner Giovanni Antonio Porcheddu, as early as 1895 was the first construction company to import and use exclusively for Italy the innovative Systéme Hennebique, the first patent for the construction of "fireproof structure and floors" in reinforced concrete filed by French engineer François Hennebique.

=== Universal Expositions and the advent of 1902 ===
In this cohort of lively cultural agitation, Turin saw the birth of the Turin edition of the Italian General Exhibition in 1884, which led, on the wave of late Romanticism, to the construction of some neo-Gothic-inspired buildings, such as the so-called Dragon House in Corso Francia. Very different was the creation of the Medieval Village and Castle in Valentino Park, initially conceived as the Pavilion of the Piedmont-Aosta Valley Region: the choice of the historical period was undoubtedly influenced by the prevailing tastes, but it was not a matter of inventing ex novo something "in style," because all the buildings contained in the complex are a faithful reproduction, and in most cases in the original size, of something that the curious traveler of the Belle Époque could find traveling through the region.

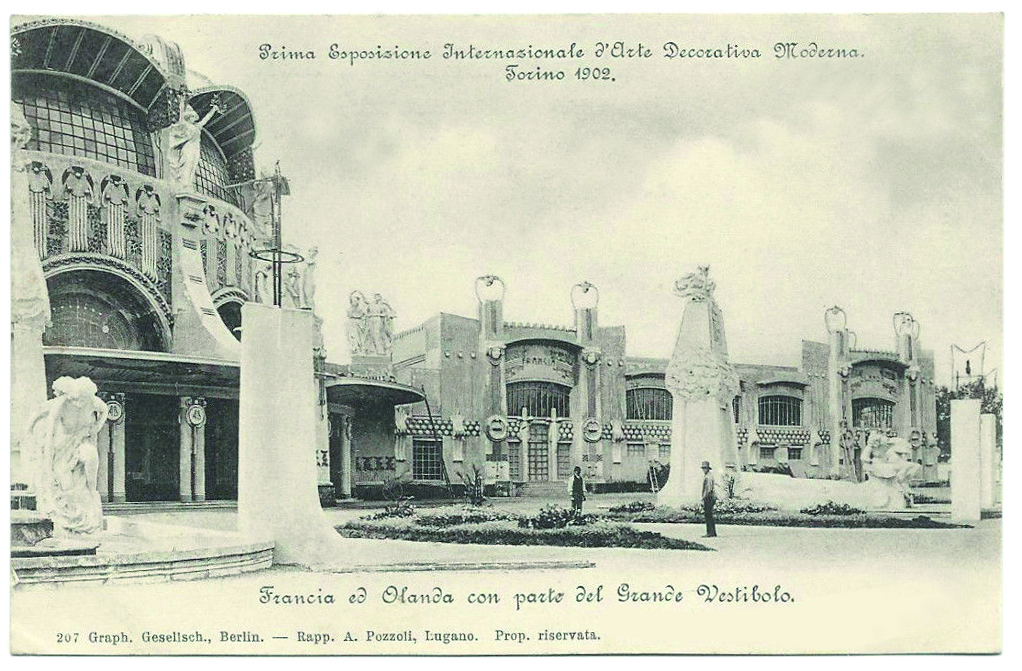
A postcard from the 1902 International Exhibition of Modern Decorative Art showing part of the Great Vestibule (on the left) and the pavilions of France and Holland

At first such events garnered lukewarm enthusiasm, however, subsequent editions were increasingly successful seeing the gradual establishment of Art Nouveau and, giving a decisive impetus to its spread, was the more ambitious goal of 1902, with the International Exhibition of Modern Decorative Art, which, in its many styled pavilions, saw it welcome prominent foreign guests including Peter Behrens, Hendrik Petrus Berlage, Victor Horta, René Lalique, Charles Rennie Mackintosh, and Henry van de Velde as well as fostering a climate that contributed to the erection of a variety of public and private buildings, thus decreeing the definitive consecration of Art Nouveau as the new dominant artistic style.

A further contribution was also made by the publishing industry, which in Turin counted the presence of important publishers such as Camilla & Bertolero, Crudo & Lattuada, Editrice Libraria F.lli Fiandesio & C. and the longest-lived of them all, Roux and Viarengo, all active since the late nineteenth century.

The former as early as 1889 published the periodical L'architettura pratica, a specialized magazine founded by the architect Andrea Donghi and later directed by his colleague Giuseppe Momo. Also published by Camilla & Bertolero was the trade magazine L'Arte Decorativa Moderna, founded in 1902 in Turin on the initiative of the Turin painter Enrico Reycend, relying on distinguished colleagues such as: Davide Calandra, Leonardo Bistolfi, Giorgio Ceragioli, and the writer Enrico Thovez. Other notable periodicals were Emporium, l'Architettura Italiana, and La Casa Bella, a title later directed by Gio Ponti and which still exists today as Casabella.

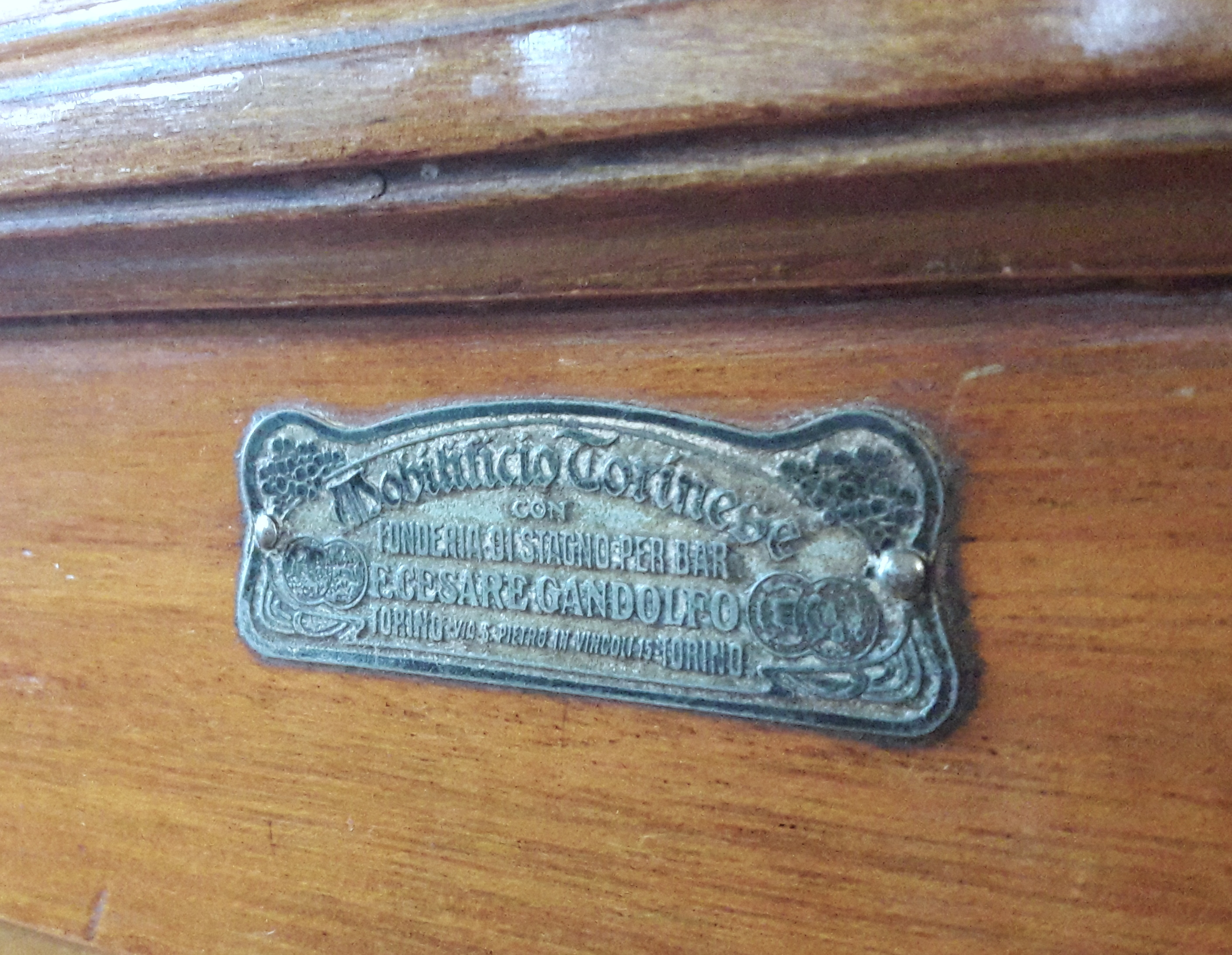
An original metal plaque from the Turin furniture factory F. Cesare Gandolfo

The furniture sector was also an active participant in the flourishing Art Nouveau period, an excellent field for the applied arts; although still not part of an industrial reality, it could count on competent workers and represented a highly appreciated craftsmanship. Some notable exponents are the Albano&Macario glassworks, which among its various works produced the Solferino Terrace, and the Torinese furniture factory F. Cesare Gandolfo that also produced many furnishings for cafes, restaurants and hotels, including the Albergo Rocciamelone in Usseglio for which it made the whole interior design.

Turin thus lived intensely the Art Nouveau season, which, although relatively short-lived, became an important point of reference for Italy, able to attract contributions from internationally prominent figures such as the Friulian architect Raimondo D'Aronco who, back from his recent realizations in Istanbul, designed the Great Vestibule for the 1902 Turin Exposition. On the wave of the exposition's success, Turin continued to be a fertile ground for a variety of experiments, albeit very coherent and restrained, by a large group of architects and engineers such as: Eugenio Ballatore di Rosana, Angelo Evasio Barberis, Giovanni Battista Benazzo, Pietro Betta, Eugenio Bonelli, Paolo Burzio, Carlo Ceppi, Camillo Dolza, Andrea Donghi, Michele Frapolli, Giuseppe Gallo, Giuseppe Gatti, Giovanni Gribodo, Quinto Grupallo, Gottardo Gussoni, Giuseppe Hendel, Giacomo Mattè Trucco, Eugenio Mollino, Giuseppe Momo, Ludovico Peracchio, Alfredo Premoli, Giovanni Reycend, Annibale Rigotti, Paolo Saccarelli, Carlo Sgarbi, Annibale Tioli, Giovanni Tirone, Giovanni Vacchetta, Antonio Vandone di Cortemilia, Giuseppe Velati Bellini, Genesio Vivarelli; however, the most prolific figure and undisputed protagonist of Turin's Art Nouveau was Pietro Fenoglio.

=== Fenoglio's work ===
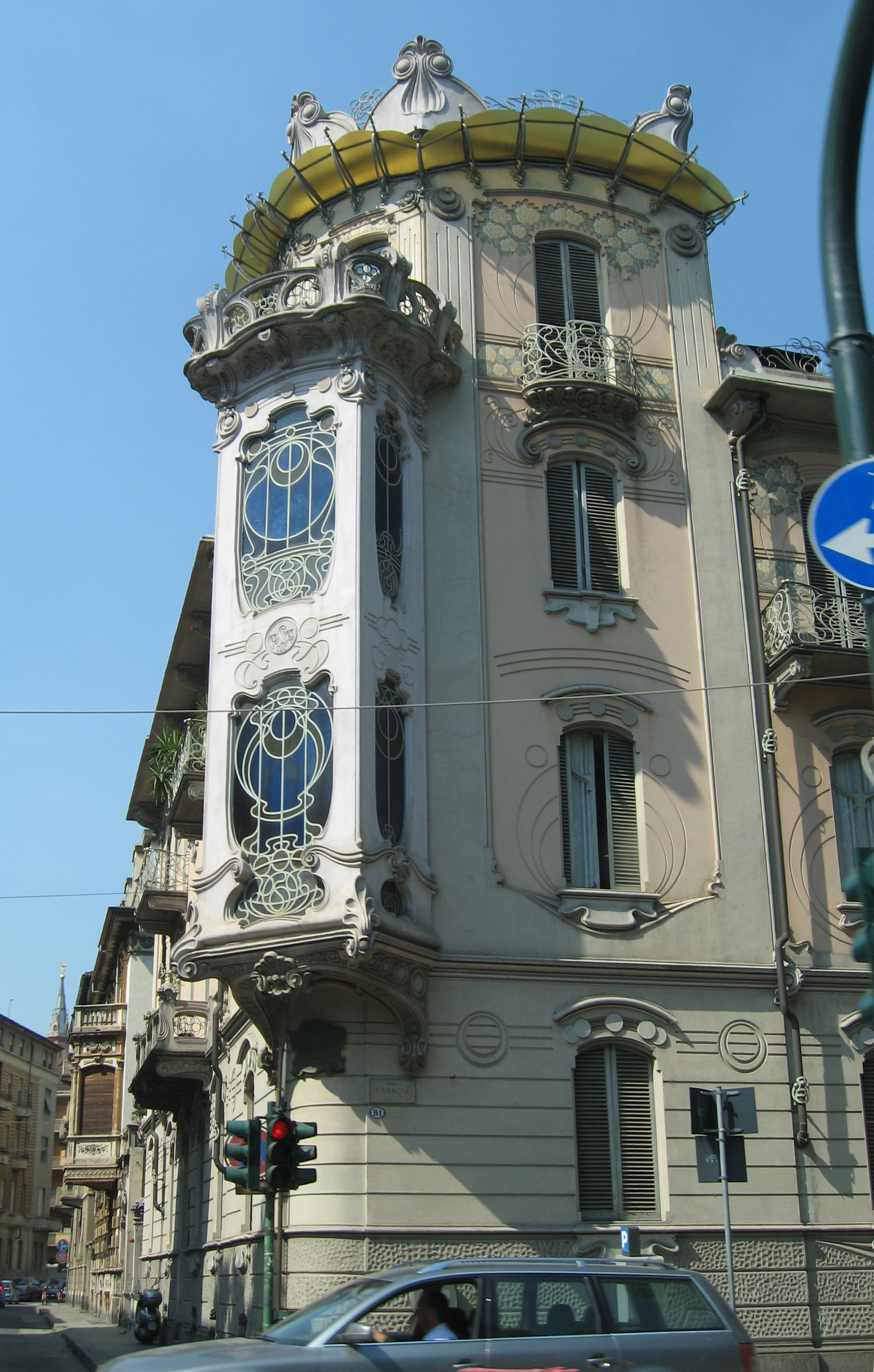
Casa Fenoglio-Lafleur

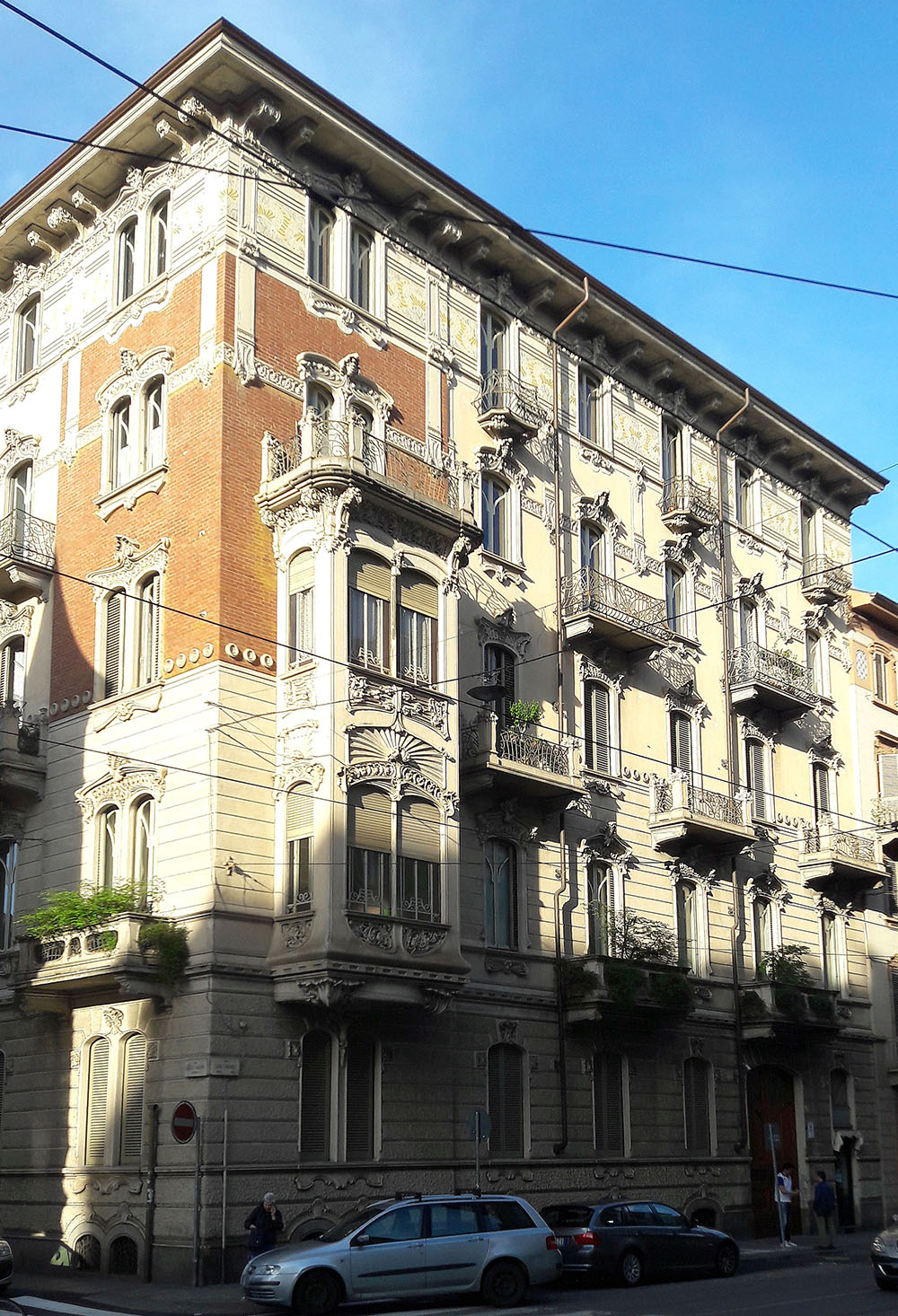
The Girardi House

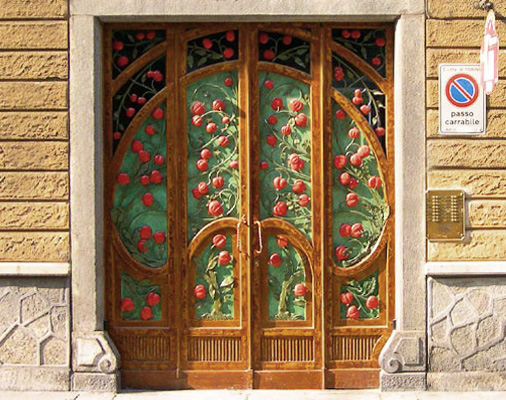
The "pomegranate gateway" at Argentero 4 Street.

The major protagonist of Art Nouveau in Turin was Pietro Fenoglio, whose prolific activity delivered to Turin some of the greatest Italian examples of this new style. He devoted himself for about thirteen years to the realization of more than three hundred projects including villas and palaces, some of them concentrated in the area of Corso Francia and adjacent streets, as well as a variety of industrial buildings commissioned by Turin's new ruling class; however, his contribution was not only that of an esteemed professional, he was also called upon to intervene at the political level, holding positions as a city councilor and consultant for the study of the new town plan completed in 1908.

Fenoglio was also among the organizers of the 1902 and 1911 editions of the International Exhibition, but he was also active in the field of publishing, appearing among the founders and most important contributors to the magazine L'architettura italiana moderna. At the same time as his intense architectural activity, he also became part of the emerging industrial and financial bourgeoisie in Turin, enriching his skills and intensifying his influence in the construction sector; Fenoglio held the position of vice-president of the well-known Impresa Porcheddu, of the Società Anonima Cementi del Monferrato, as well as that of partner of the Accomandita Ceirano & C. and managing director of the nascent Banca Commerciale Italiana.

Fenoglio's work is characterized by the skillful use of pastel hues, wall decorations alternating floral subjects with circular geometric elements, and the extensive use of litho-cement frames juxtaposed with the sometimes bold decorative elegance of iron and glass, electing them as favored materials. Among his best-known works are: the Villino Raby (1901), (Note: Located at Corso Francia 8 and built in collaboration with architect Gottardo Gussoni.) the famous Villa Scott (1902), (Note: Located in the hilly area, it was chosen by director Dario Argento as the set for the famous film Profondo rosso.) a triumph of loggias, turrets, stained-glass windows, bay windows, and, above all, his best-known and most appreciated work: Casa Fenoglio-Lafleur (1902), (Note: It was built by Fenoglio as a "house-studio," a rather widespread custom at the time: the architects Bonelli, Vandone di Cortemilia and, before them, Antonelli also did so. Later Casa Fenoglio was sold to a wealthy Frenchman named Lafleur and from then on became Casa Fenoglio-Lafleur.) considered "the most significant example of Art Nouveau style in Italy."

Other noteworthy buildings that repurposed decorative elements derived from the success of Casa Fenoglio-Lafleur are Casa Rossi-Galateri (1903) on Via Passalacqua and Casa Girardi (1904) at 54 Via Cibrario. Fenoglio's work turned out to be relatively short-lived but fruitful, and numerous other similar buildings can also be mentioned: Casa Rey (1904), Casa Boffa-Costa (1904), Casa Macciotta (1904), Casa Balbis (1905), Casa Ina (Note: Example of a "rent house" made for the insurance company Ina-Assitalia.) (1906), Casa Guelpa (1907), until he pushed out of Piedmont, with the realization of the Villa Magni-Rizzoli in Canzo, near Como.

Fenoglio also had as clients the nascent world of industry, which found Turin a favorable place to establish headquarters for new settlements. Among the best known are: the Fiorio Tannery (1900), the Boero Plant (1905), the Ballada Foundries (1906), the Officine Diatto automobile plant (1907), and the large building of Italy's first brewery, Bosio & Caratsch, with its adjoining manor house (1907), and the Leumann Village.

==== The Leumann Village ====
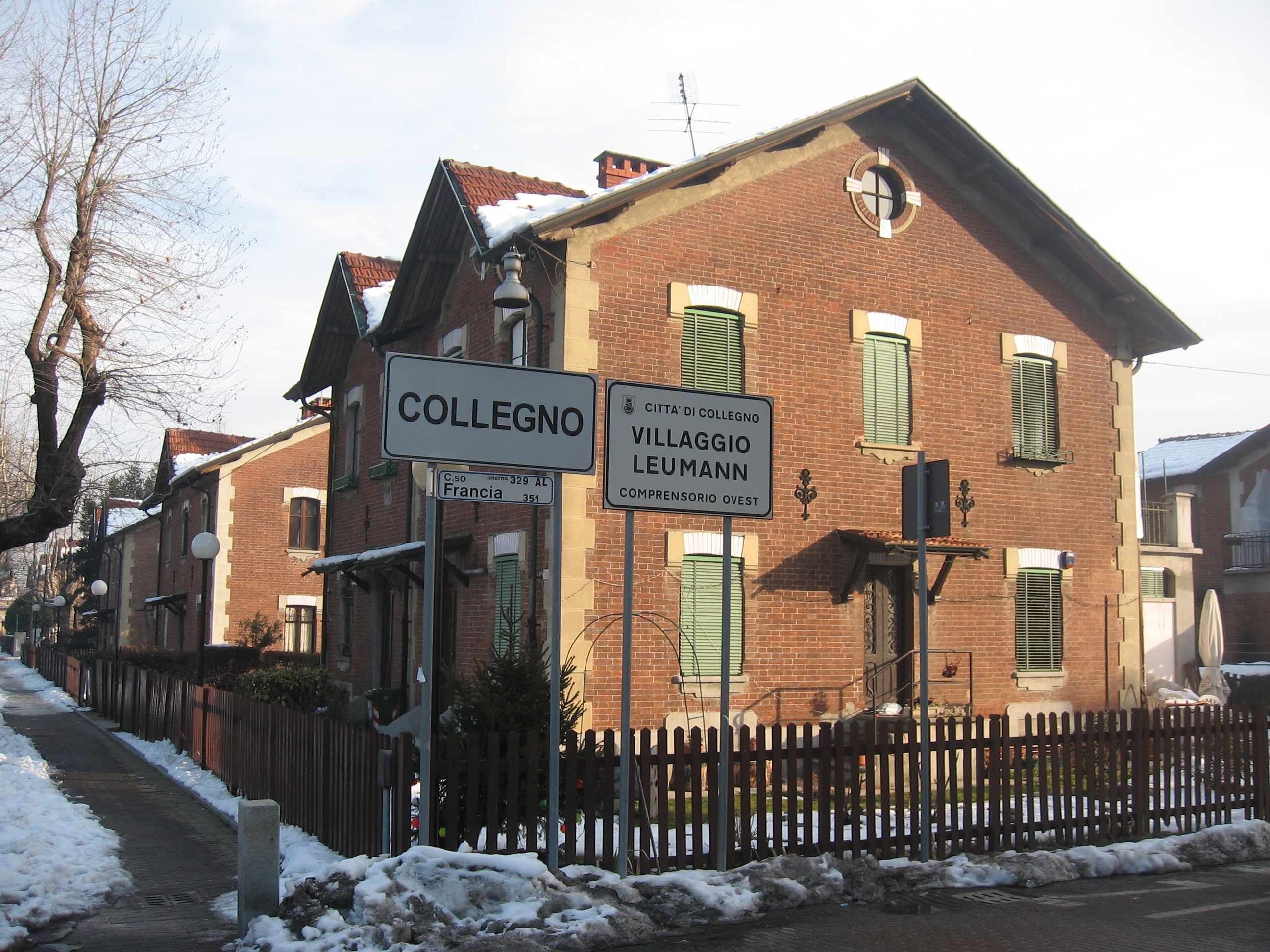
One of the dwellings in Leumann Village

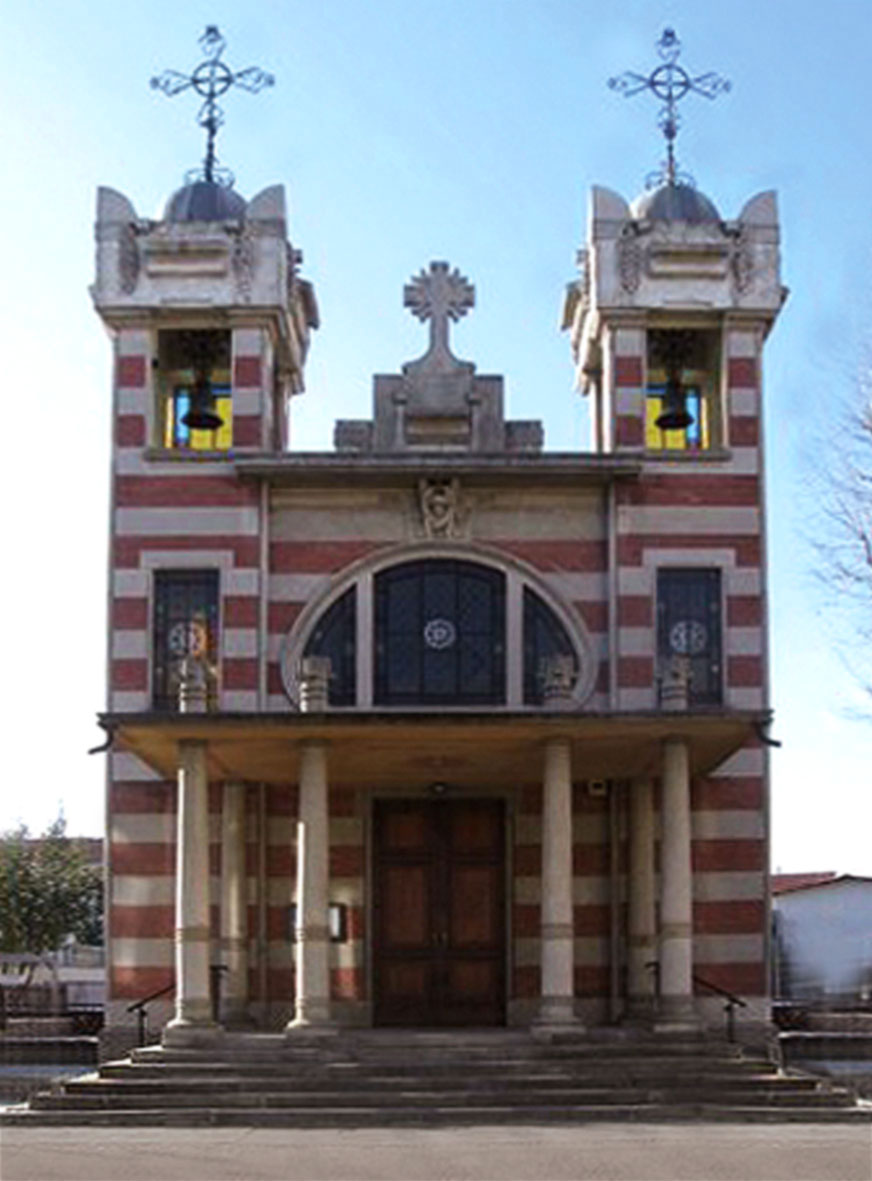
The Leumann Village church, one of the very few in the world in the Art Nouveau style

With his experience in industrial factory design, Fenoglio was also involved in the vast Leumann Village project. (Note: Original pronunciation: /ˈlɔjman/; Leumann is a surname of German origin and, as such, the diphthong eu should be pronounced oi. However, the pronunciation /ˈlɛuman/, which is much more common in local usage, has been established.) It was the brainchild of an entrepreneur of Swiss origin, Napoleone Leumann, who moved his textile company's factory from Voghera to Turin, benefiting from the facilities offered by the Piedmontese capital, a remnant of the capital's disputed move first to Florence and then to Rome; in addition, the ample supply of skilled labor at reduced costs completed the process of attracting capital and entrepreneurs, including foreign ones such as Abegg, Geisser, Kind, Metzger, Menier, Remmert, and Scott, contributing to making Turin the new capital of industry. The choice fell on the vast plot of land of about 60,000 sq. m. in the countryside surrounding Collegno, at that time a small town on the outskirts of the city. Also crucial in the choice of the site was the presence of irrigation canals and the proximity of the new railway, which, running along the axis of today's Corso Francia, allowed a rapid connection with Turin, nearby Rivoli but also with the Susa Valley and France through the new Fréjus tunnel.

The complex, designed between 1875 and 1907 by Pietro Fenoglio, consists of two residential areas on the side of the textile factory, which ceased operations in 2007, originally housing about a thousand people including workers, employees and their families. It still includes within it 59 cottages and houses divided into 120 dwellings, (Note: Long used by the City of Collegno as public housing. See B. Coda N., R. Fraternali & C. L. Ostorero (2017, pp. 148–152).) each provided from the beginning with attached toilets and a shared garden on the ground floor. In addition to the cotton mill, dwellings, public baths, the "Wera Leumann" kindergarten and school, (Note: Still used today by the City of Collegno. Some of the original furnishings still exist and were made child-friendly and inspired by the didactics of the German pedagogist Friedrich Fröbel; the kindergarten was named after the memory of little Wera Leumann, daughter of Napoleon and Amalia Leumann, who died prematurely at the age of three. See B. Coda N., R. Fraternali & C. L. Ostorero (2017, pp. 154–155).) Fenoglio also designed the church of St. Elizabeth: (Note: It was dedicated to St. Elizabeth in memory of Elizabeth Knecthlin, mother of Napoleon Leumann. See B. Coda N., R. Fraternali & C. L. Ostorero (2017, p. 155).) one of the very few in the world built in Art Nouveau style, along with Otto Wagner's St. Leopold Church in Vienna. (Note: Art Nouveau was considered an inappropriate style for the creation of sacred architecture because it flaunted forms that were too frivolous, sometimes sensual and often evocative of a stereotype of femininity that was considered decadent and lascivious.)

The urban planning organization, the architecture of the buildings, the social institutions and welfare services created in it made the village an organism that placed at the center of its goals a higher quality of life for the workers, both at work and in their private lives; a well-defined area in which work, family, leisure, social and welfare institutions were closely connected, forming a socially evolved and efficient environment.

Similar examples arose in the same period in Lombardy and Veneto, but the Leumann Village is perhaps the most extensive, complete and functional example, such that it has become an interesting historical, cultural and architectural landmark.

=== Other figures of Turin's Art Nouveau ===
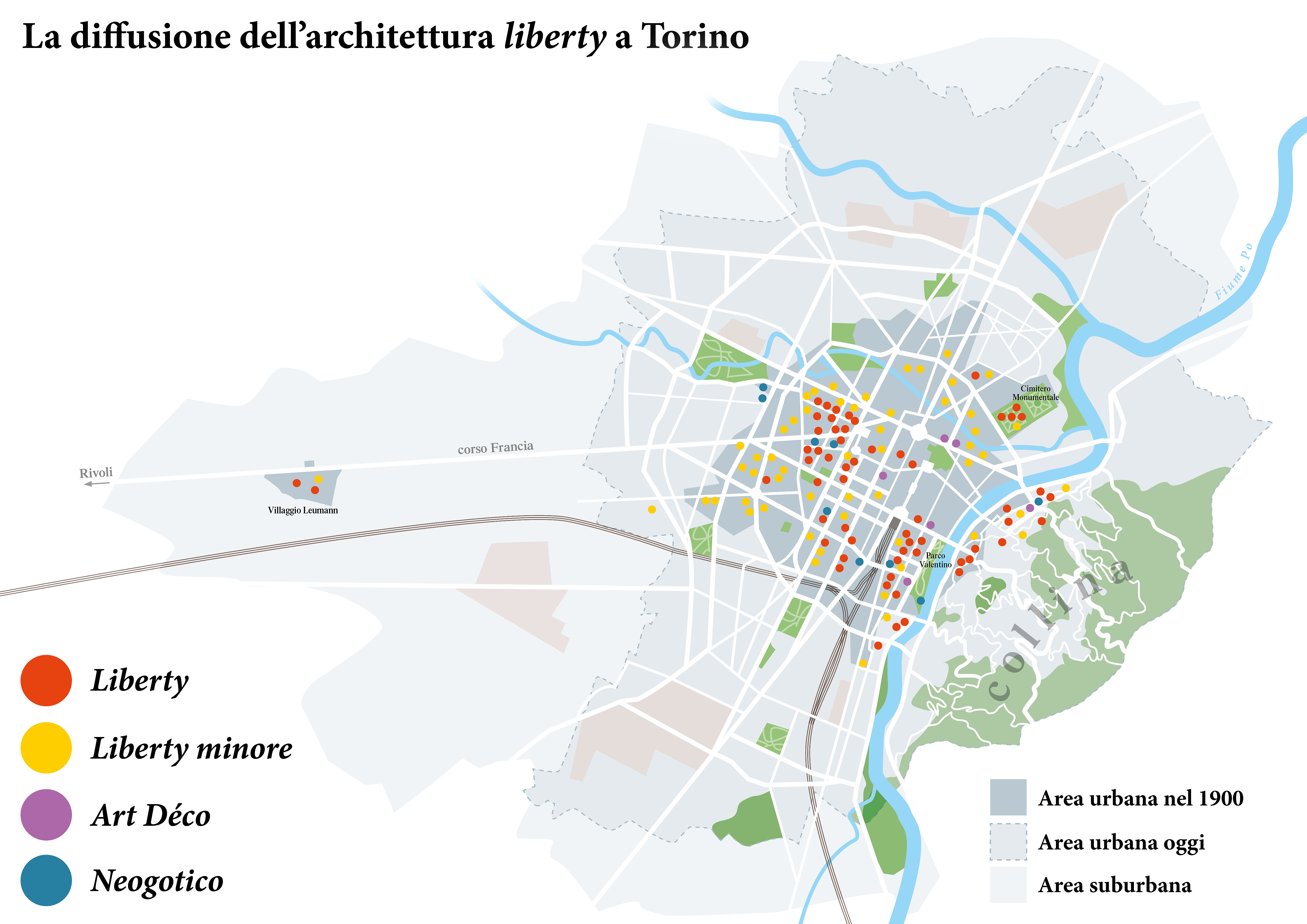

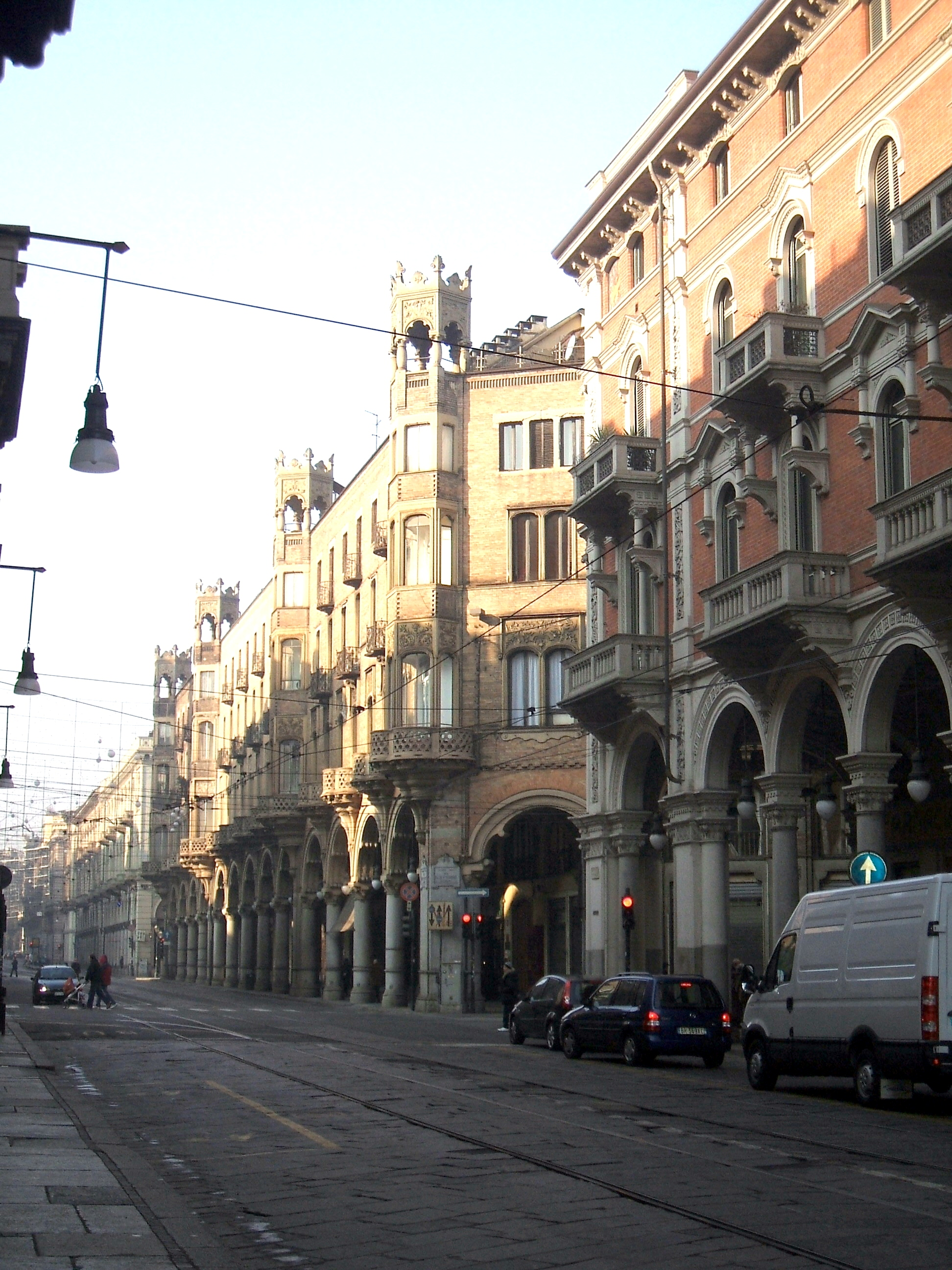
Carlo Ceppi's Bellia Palace on Pietro Micca Street, one of the very first Art Nouveau experiments in the city

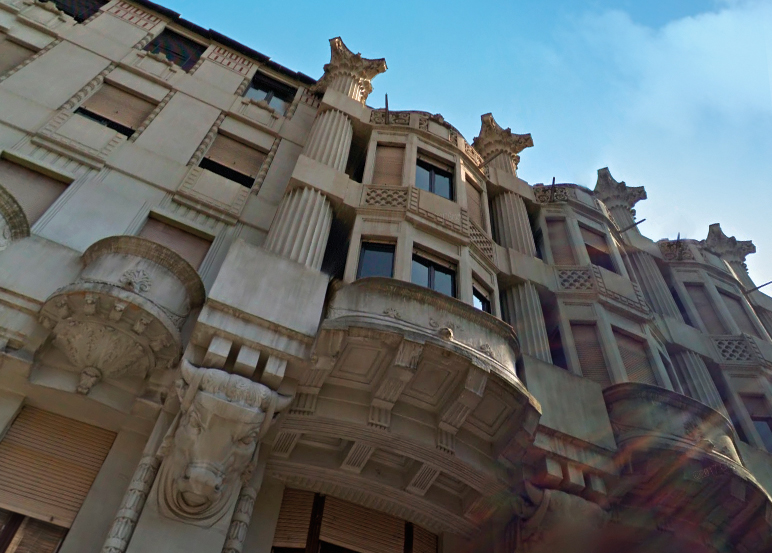
The Avezzano House of P. Betta

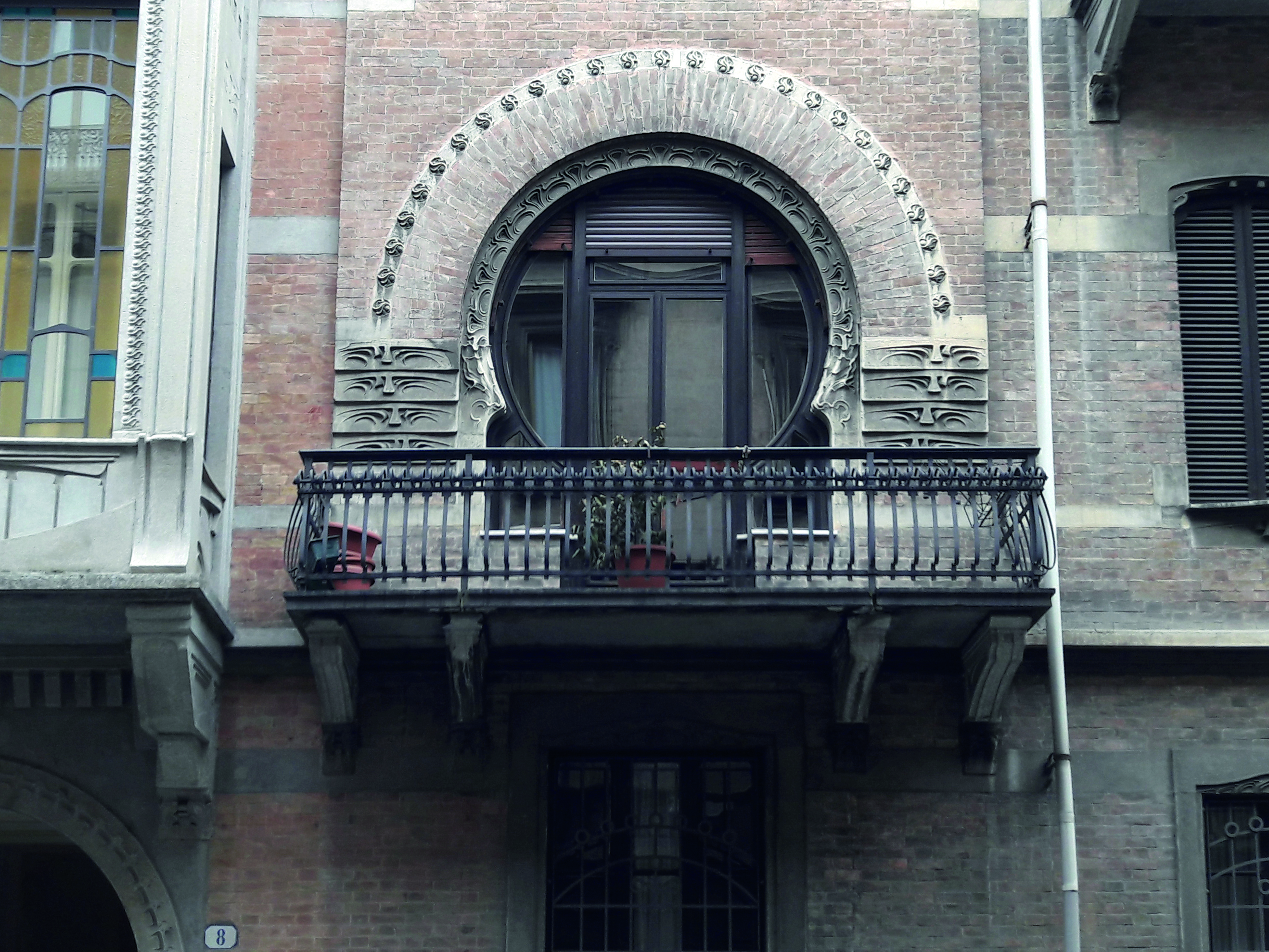
A detail of the sezessionstil of Casa Bonelli at Papacino 8 Street

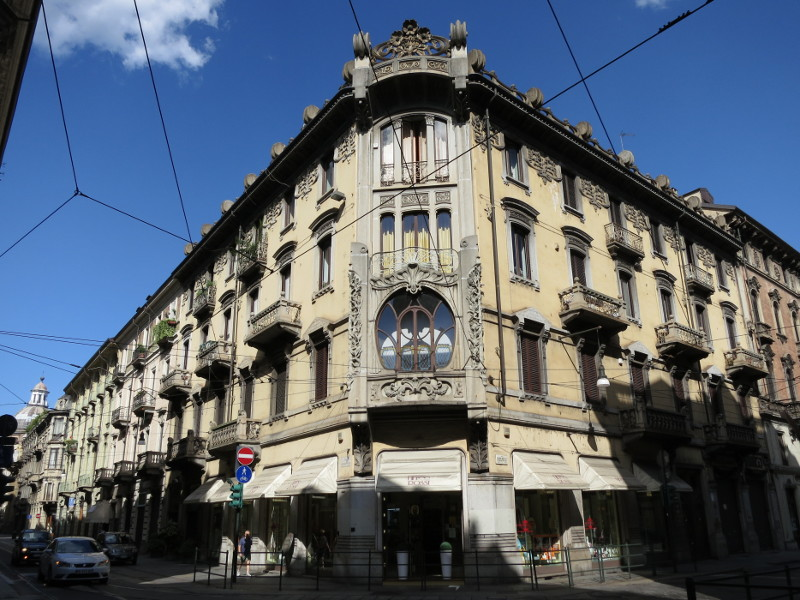
The Florio House on Bertola Street at the corner of San Francesco d'Assisi Street by G. Velati Bellini

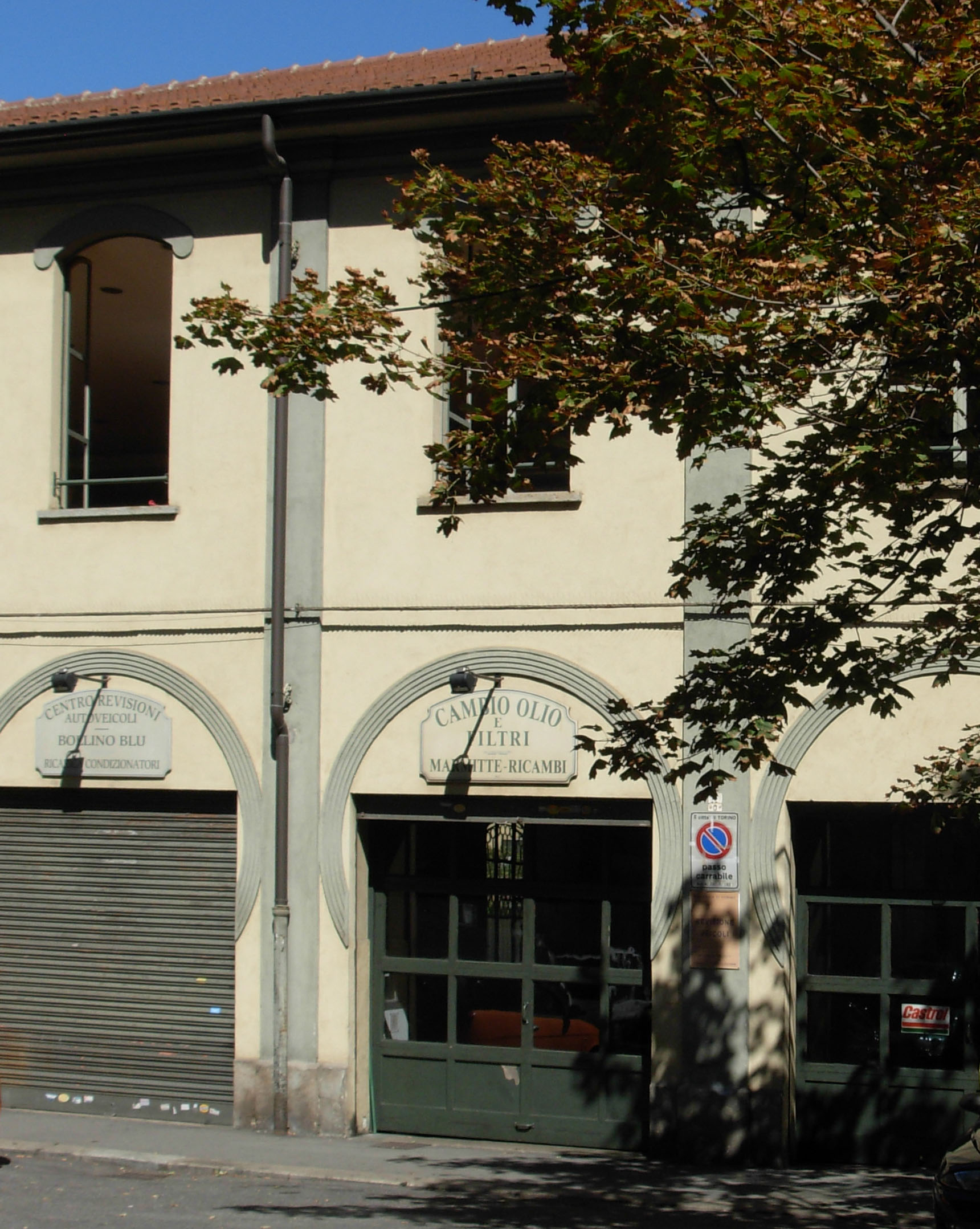
The building that housed the first workshops of Accomandita Ceirano & C., at 17 Corso Raffaello

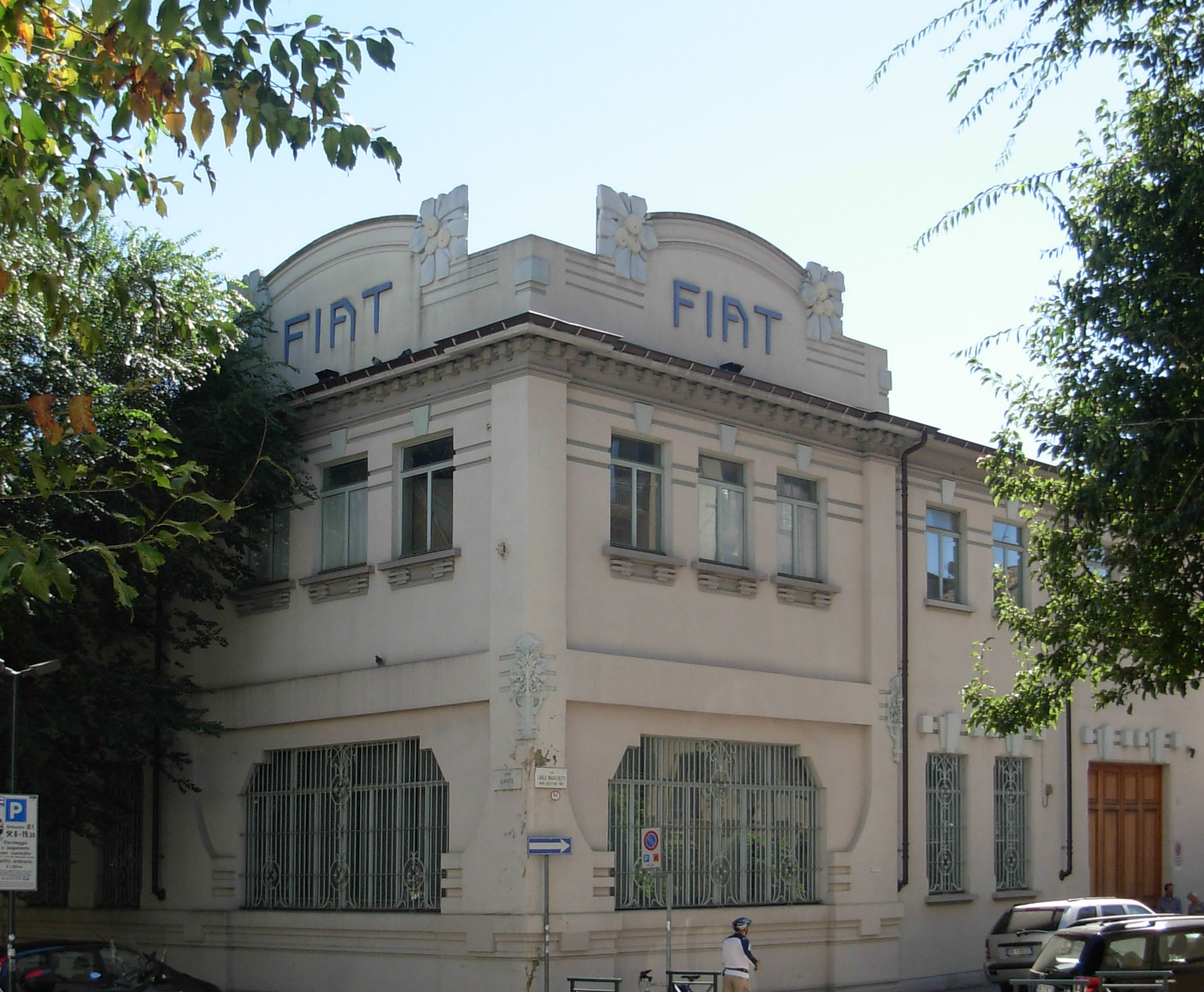
The building that housed the first FIAT factory at 100 Corso Dante Alighieri (1904–1906), the work of Alfredo Premoli; today it is the Fiat Historical Center.

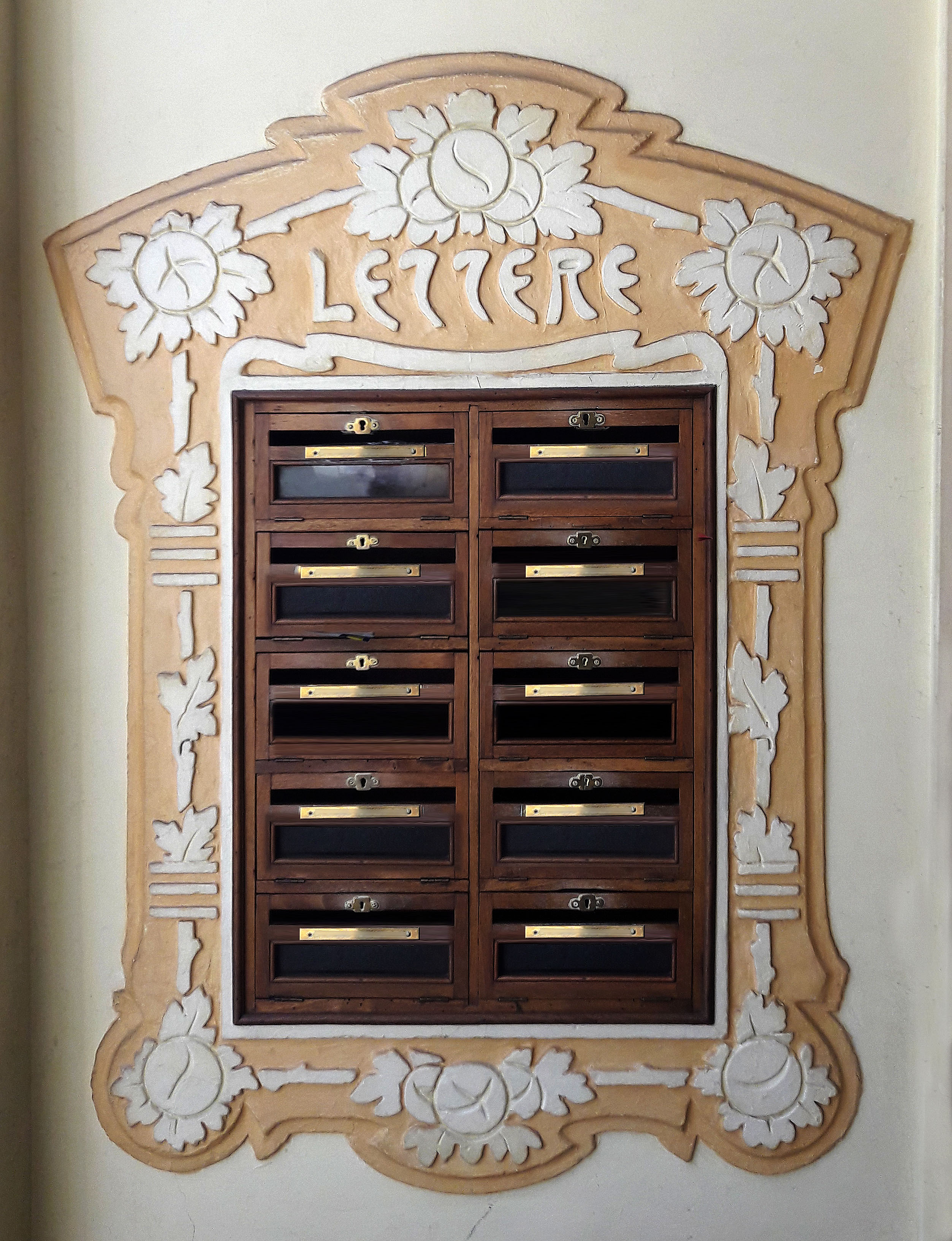
Detail of the mailbox of the letterbox at Papacino 4 Street

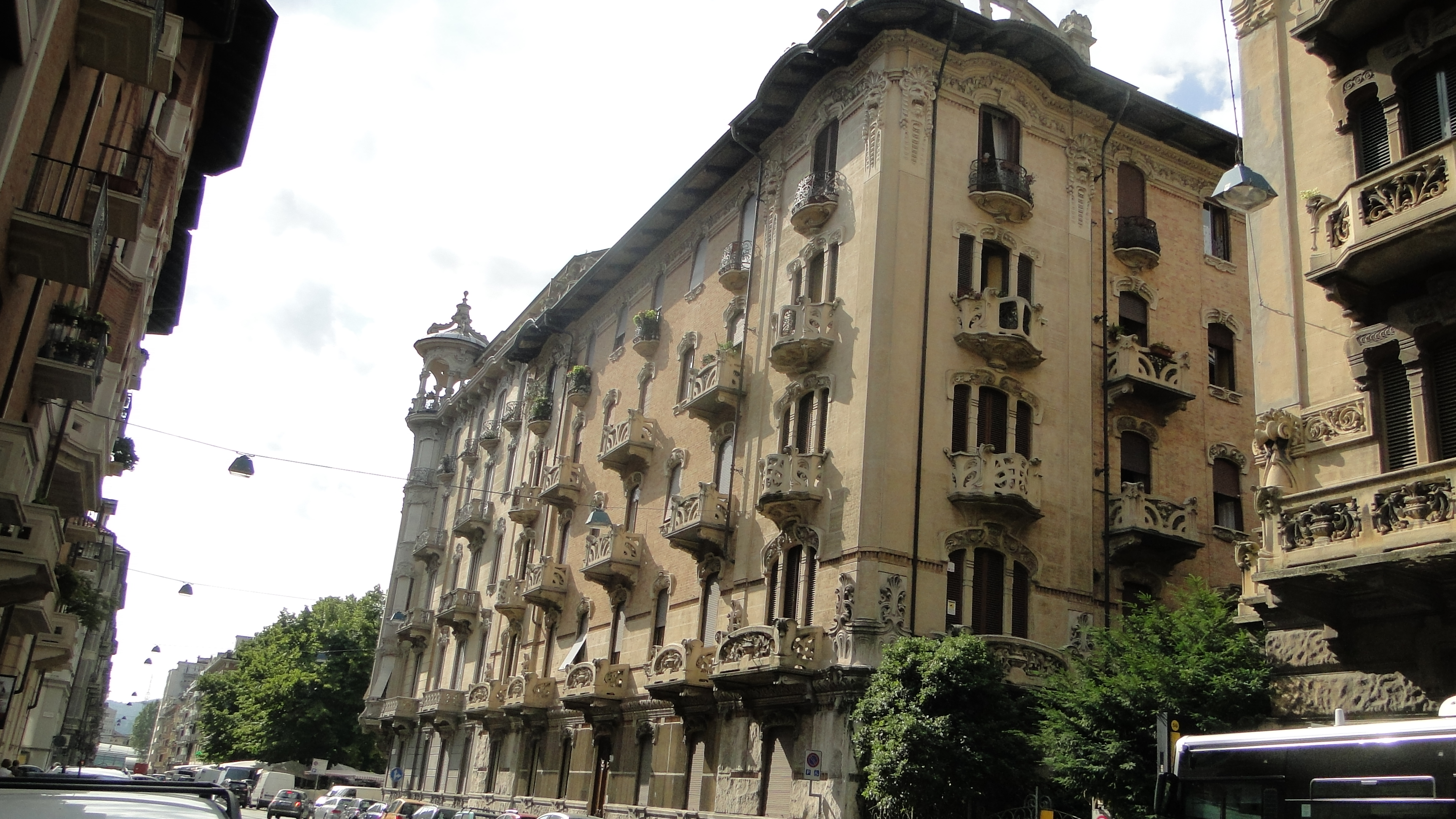
The buildings on Via Duchessa Jolanda

Despite the mainly Baroque connotation of the Guarini and Juvarrian school, the architectural heritage of the old Savoy capital still preserves almost intact important Art Nouveau vestiges and the presence of architecture from that period is still perceptible in some central areas of the capital such as the districts of the historic center, the Crocetta, San Salvario, the hill but with an absolute predominance in the area including the San Donato and Cit Turin districts. Anyway art nouvau buildings are spread all over Turin, also in industrial districts of the north area

The symbols of some early experiments that, from a still evidently eclectic approach so cherished by Carlo Ceppi, nonetheless hint at Art Nouveau protostyles are Palazzo Bellia (1898) (Note: This was the first civil building in Turin to apply the Systéme Hennebique for the use of reinforced concrete for floors. See B. Coda N., R. Fraternali & C. L. Ostorero (2017, p. 89).) and Palazzo Priotti (1900). There Ceppi knew how to blend Baroque and eclectic stylistic features with Art Nouveau sinuosity and, in the case of Palazzo Bellia, made extensive use of bay windows, turrets and trefoil arches, making it one of the most characteristic buildings in the central Via Pietro Micca.

A pupil of Carlo Ceppi, the prolific Pietro Fenoglio built his success on the Art Nouveau style, and his stylistic influence inspired numerous other architects, fueling a growing and fruitful competition that made Turin's Art Nouveau season noteworthy. The antagonism of the large group of architects who worked in Turin during these years also saw different currents of the same style flourish; architect Pietro Betta, for example, differed to embrace a style more traceable to the sezessionstil and in whose studio young architects such as Domenico Soldiero Morelli and Armando Melis de Villa, protagonists of the later season of Italian Rationalism, were trained. Betta's work was distinguished by its more monumental approach, influenced by classical elements skillfully combined with secessionist stylistic features, the most notable example of which appears in the Avezzano House (1912) in the Crocetta district, where the façade is punctuated by a sequence of large projecting Corinthian columns supported by taurine protomes and "chained" to a series of bay windows.

Other markedly Secessionist examples are Casa Bonelli (1904), the residence of the same architect Bonelli, whose elevations are characterized by very distinctive French windows surrounded by a wide circular frame bearing a finely decorated ornamentation, and Casa Mussini, an austere residential building in the Precollina, designed by architect Ferrari in 1914.

Another exponent close to Pietro Betta's design vocabulary was architect Annibale Rigotti, who, on the corner of Via Vassalli Eandi with Via Principi d'Acaja, not far from Fenoglio's Casa Ina, designed Casa Baravalle (1902), a single-family villa recognizable by its blue walls and characterized by geometric decorations, with extremely sober forms. There Rigotti, already the author of several pavilions at the 1902 International Exhibition, seems almost to anticipate the rigor that would prevail in the later Deco style.

From 1902 onward, on the wave of the success of the expositions, Art Nouveau spread throughout the city, contributing to its growth. The city's concomitant industrial vocation also attracted some new labor, and the demand for housing grew to such an extent that the urban fabric expanded. With the advent of electricity and its increasing diffusion, industries proliferated and established new settlements on the outskirts of the city, permanently abandoning the San Donato district and the pre-hill area, a forced choice until the motive force was relegated to the hydraulic power of the mills and jacks that rose in the areas characterized by steep gradients.

The San Salvario district, close to the Valentino Park and where the expositions of those years were held, was precisely one of the first to develop new blocks of industrial establishments and residential housing, sometimes modifying the elevations of existing buildings or requesting permission for design variations so that buildings with a "contemporary" appearance could be constructed. In addition to the numerous rented dwellings in the nearby Via Pietro Giuria, Via Saluzzo, and Via Madama Cristina, Villa Javelli, the Turin home that D'Aronco designed and had built for his wife, also arose in San Salvario; not far away is also the well-known Villino Kind (1906), the residence of the Swiss engineer Adolfo Kind, who became famous in Italy for having first introduced the new sport of skiing, as well as the founder of the first Italian club, the Ski Club Torino.

Even the world of industry, as mentioned above, was not indifferent to the unprecedented sinuosity of the Art Nouveau style. In addition to the tanneries and breweries designed by Fenoglio in the San Donato area, the new headquarters of the Impresa Porcheddu also moved to the San Salvario district in 1903, so directly involved in the building frenzy of these decades, it occupied a low building that stood at Corso Valentino 20, that is, at the current former FIAT headquarters in Corso Marconi, which was built in the mid-1930s. (Note: […] The move to new premises, a large, low building for offices and laboratories, located at Corso Valentino 20 (today Corso Marconi n.d.r.), took place in 1903; there the company could also have a laboratory for load tests on semi-finished products.[…] See R. Nelva & B. Signorelli (1990, p. 21)) The nascent automobile industry also played the role of commissioner; one of the first workshops to make use of a new structure according to the dictates of the new current was that of Accomandita Ceirano & C., Turin's first automobile workshop producing small Welleyes-branded vehicles equipped with internal-combustion engines and of which Fenoglio himself was a partner; it moved its operations in 1906 to the southern outskirts of the city, in what is now Corso Raffaello 17, in a building still easily recognizable by its access gates surrounded by large circular volutes in litho-cement. Fiat itself, which was incorporated in Turin precisely in 1899, commissioned its first plant from the young architect Alfredo Premoli who, between 1904 and 1906, in Corso Dante Alighieri built the complex including the Scuola Allievi and the first factory, whose building is conspicuously framed by stylized floral motifs on the corners of the litho-cement cymaeas on the top bearing the acronym of the Turin car manufacturer.

Also significant is the Galleria dell'Industria Subalpina, a structure inspired by typical Parisian passages albeit still a relic of eclectic taste, which housed the famous Caffè Romano (Note: After World War II it was transformed into the present Roman Cinema.) and is overlooked by the elegant Caffè Baratti & Milano, renovated in 1909; its entrance from the arcades of Piazza Castello exhibits a rich marble frame embellished with bronze bas-reliefs and richly worked interiors, with extensive use of marble intarsias and stuccoes.

In the Crocetta district, on the other hand, one can admire the remarkable Casa Maffei (1905), with railings and wrought ironwork by the Lombard master Alessandro Mazzucotelli, designed by Antonio Vandone of Cortemilia; other examples of his to mention are some of the palaces on Corso Galileo Ferraris and Corso Re Umberto, characteristic for their phytomorphic decorations and extensive use of stained glass and wrought iron. However, the architect Vandone di Cortemilia also devoted himself to commercial premises: the Caffè Mulassano in central Piazza Castello, whose small size does not, however, make the elegant boiseries and mirrors, the coffered ceiling in wood and leather and the numerous bronze decorations look out of place. Further works by Vandone di Cortemilia can also be found at the Monumental Cemetery, along with other works by L. Bistolfi, (Note: Among his patrons of particular importance was the royal family, and some of his works were purchased by Umberto I and Victor Emmanuel III.) D. Calandra, G. Casanova, C. Fumagalli, E. Rubino and A. Mazzucotelli.

In the San Donato area, in addition to Casa Fenoglio on Via Piffetti, (Note: Nos. 10 and 12.) there are two examples dated 1908, by Giovanni Gribodo, and not far away there are other examples of Art Nouveau buildings on Via Durandi, Via Cibrario and again on Via Piffetti, at number 35; while by Giovan Battista Benazzo are Casa Tasca (1903), which flaunts floral decorations, circular geometric motifs and rich wrought iron decorations for railings and windows.

In the neighboring Cìt Turìn district, along Via Duchessa Jolanda, stand two palaces designed by Gottardo Gussoni, clear examples of late Art Nouveau dating from 1914; similarly, the buildings in the rear of Via Susa also repeat the same layout: a central courtyard with a low building at the bottom surmounted by a crenellated turret, an element that made Gussoni's Art Nouveau style increasingly characterized by an eclecticism that would later result in a true neo-Gothic style, so much so that he became one of the favorite architects of Cav. Carrera.

=== Daniele Donghi and Camillo Dolza: two engineers in the service of public administration ===
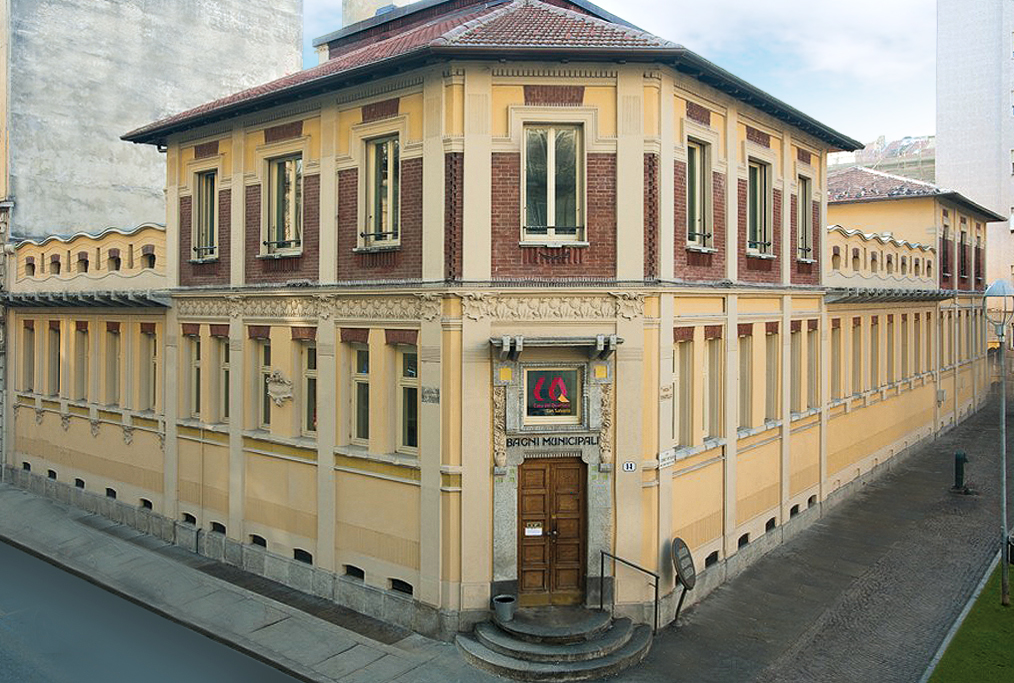
The former Municipal Baths on O. Morgari Street

Turin's Art Nouveau season was also characterized by conspicuous construction of public buildings including schools, offices and public baths. Illustrious exponents emerged in this sector of local government, including engineer Daniele Donghi, formerly a professor of technical architecture in Milan and Padua, who for about fifteen years was head of the Technical Office of Public Works, a position he left at the turn of the similar position at the City of Padua, that of Venice, eventually becoming director of the Milan branch of the Porcheddu Company of Turin.

Donghi was succeeded by engineer Camillo Dolza, who signed the most important public building projects in Turin in the early decades of the twentieth century, including the imposing building of the female high school "V. Monti" in corso Galileo Ferraris 11 (1900), (Note: Though strongly eclectic.) the first Municipal Baths in via G. Saccarelli (1901), those in via O. Morgari (1905), those in Borgo Vanchiglia (1910), the Poste e Telegrafi building in via Alfieri (1908) and the new elementary school "Santorre di Santarosa" in via Braccini (1920).

== Neo-Gothic style and the detractors of Art Nouveau ==
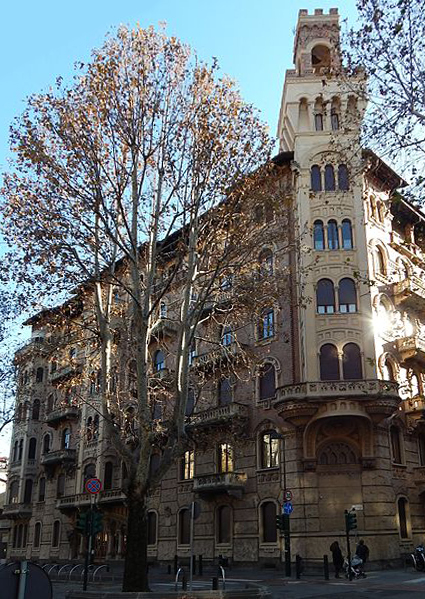
Casa della Vittoria, in Corso Francia

Parallel to the naturalism of Art Nouveau, the neo-Gothic current continued to be the preferred style of the aristocracy and patrons of a more conservative and traditionalist taste; moreover, due to the strong allegorical connotation of medieval inspiration, it confirmed itself as the preferred style for the realization of religious buildings, if we exclude the only Italian case of the Art Nouveau church dedicated to Saint Elizabeth, inside the Leumann Village.

One of the greatest detractors of Art Nouveau was the Turin poet Guido Gozzano who, ironically, lived and died in a building designed according to this new style by Pietro Fenoglio. (Note: The Rama House at Cibrario Street 65.) He often made harsh remarks about Art Nouveau, going so far as to call it a "rubella of good taste," almost likening it to a passing infatuation with European models that, according to his thinking, had no connection with the Italian architectural tradition; on the contrary, in Neo-Gothic he sensed a healthy "return to order" that sheltered from dangerous, overly daring stylistic avant-gardes.

Of the same idea were also the leading members of the nobility and finance who, though without resorting to neo-Gothic, preferred a more sober, traditional and conservative neoclassical style for their representative buildings, as happened, for example, with the eclectic building of Assicurazioni Generali Venezia in Piazza Solferino, designed by Pietro Fenoglio, who nevertheless bowed there to the unquestionable requirements of the client.

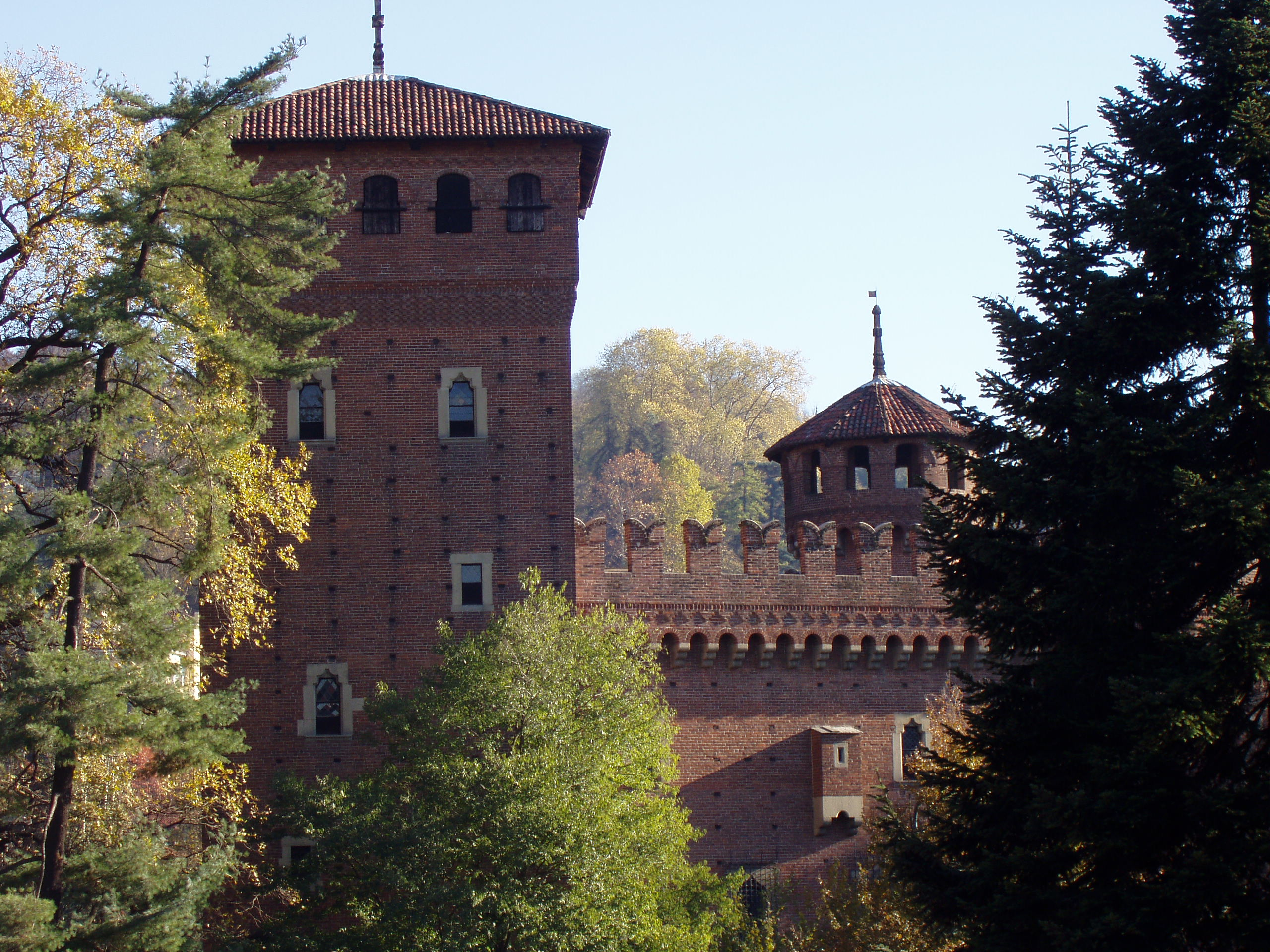
A view of the medieval village of Valentino Park

In addition to the well-known Borgo Medievale in the Valentino Park, the result of a careful study of local medieval remains coordinated by Portuguese architect Alfredo d'Andrade, excellent examples of civil architecture can be seen in the elegant residential neighborhood Cit Turin in the works commissioned by Carrera: the Casa della Vittoria (Note: Also popularly known as the "house of dragons.") (1918–20) by Gottardo Gussoni, together with the home of Carrera himself, (Note: Located at Giacinto Collegno Street 44.) are the most notable examples. Also noteworthy in the same neighborhood is the work of architect Giuseppe Gallo, to whom is owed the design of the church dedicated to Jesus Nazarene facing Martini Square. (Note: Commonly known as "Beneficial Square.") Further examples of neo-Gothic style civic buildings can be highlighted in the nearby San Donato neighborhood with the group of houses on Via Piffetti, (Note: No. 3 and 5.) famous for their wrought ironwork, characteristic sphinxes and peacock-tail decorations.

Other isolated examples of neo-Gothic by Giuseppe Gallo are also to be found in the San Salvario area (Note: Residential building at Nice Street 43, on the corner of Morgari Street.) and in the Crocetta district, where stands the Casa Lattes (1911), an imposing example at the intersection of Via Sacchi and Corso Sommelier. In the Parella district, on the other hand, at the time the extreme suburbs surrounded by the countryside, stands Palazzotto Arduino, a rich example of neo-Gothic designed by architect Paolo Napione in 1926, when by then the architectural avant-garde was already experimenting in the city with the first examples of rationalism, such as Palazzo Gualino.

== The final parable of Art Nouveau, the advent of Art Deco and neoliberty ==
=== Art Deco ===
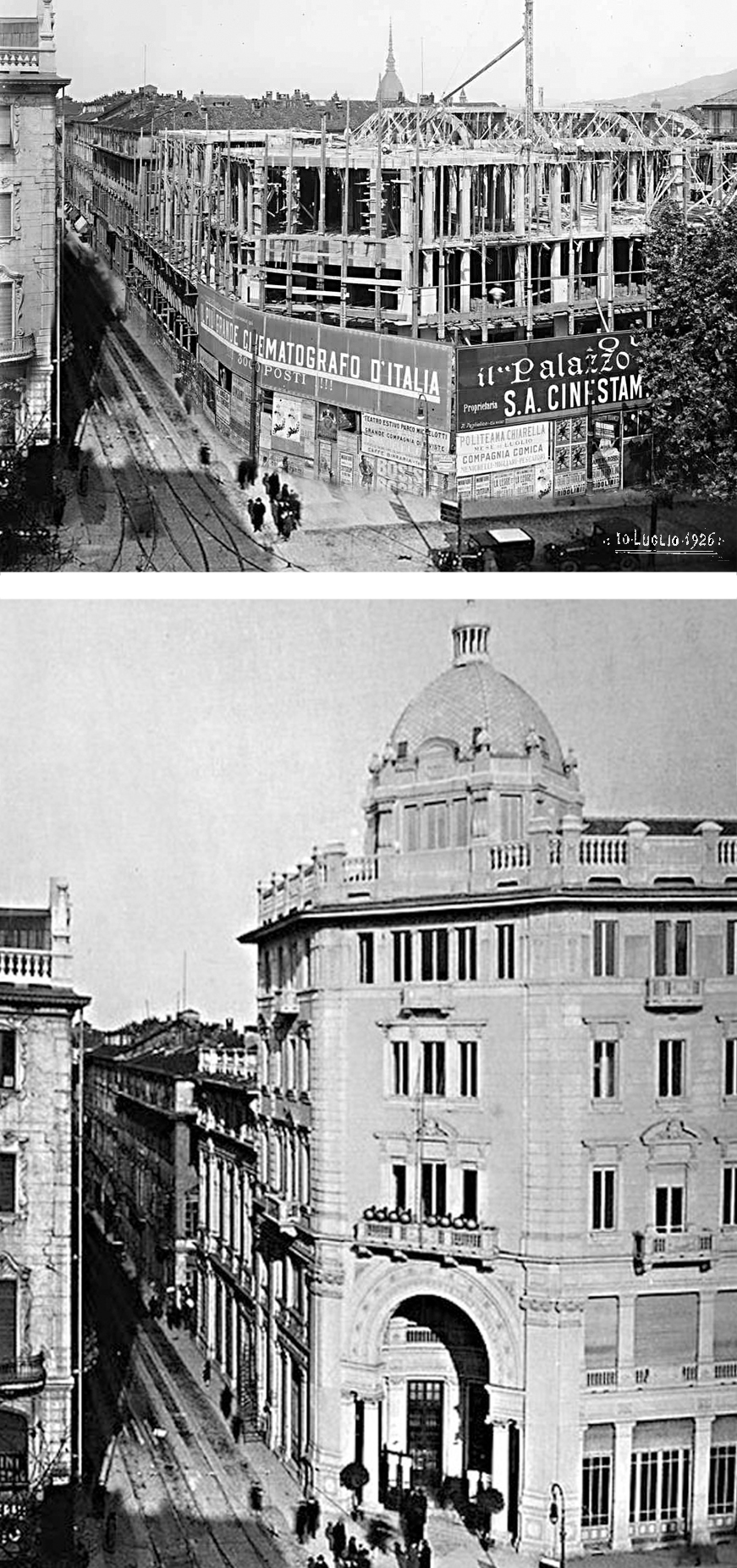
Construction and completion phase of the building that from 1926 housed the Cinema Palace, later Cinema Corso

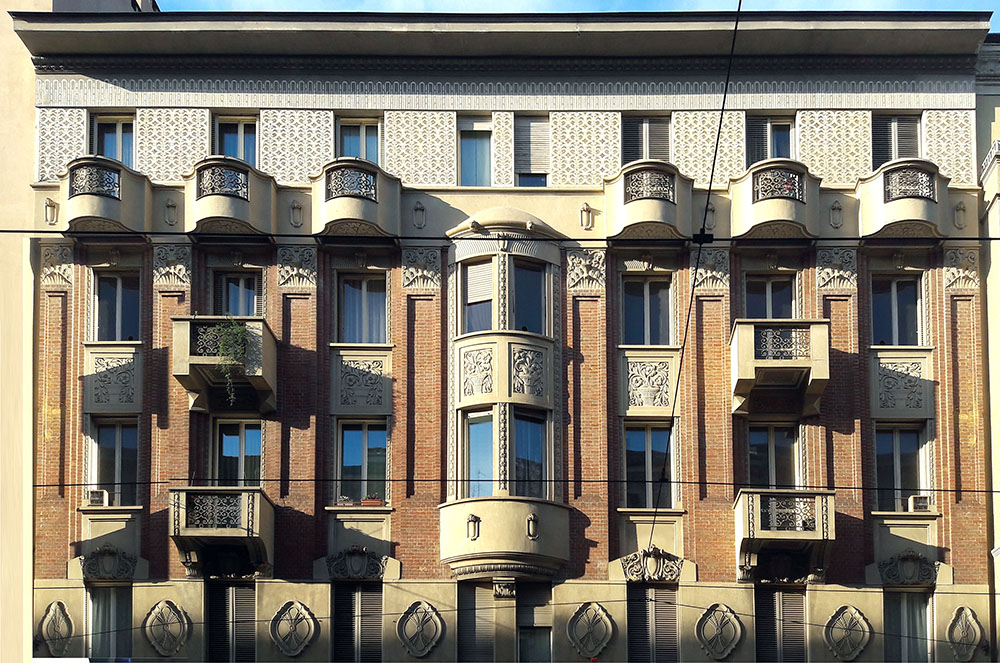
Enrieu House, an early example of Deco on L. Street. Cibrario (1914)

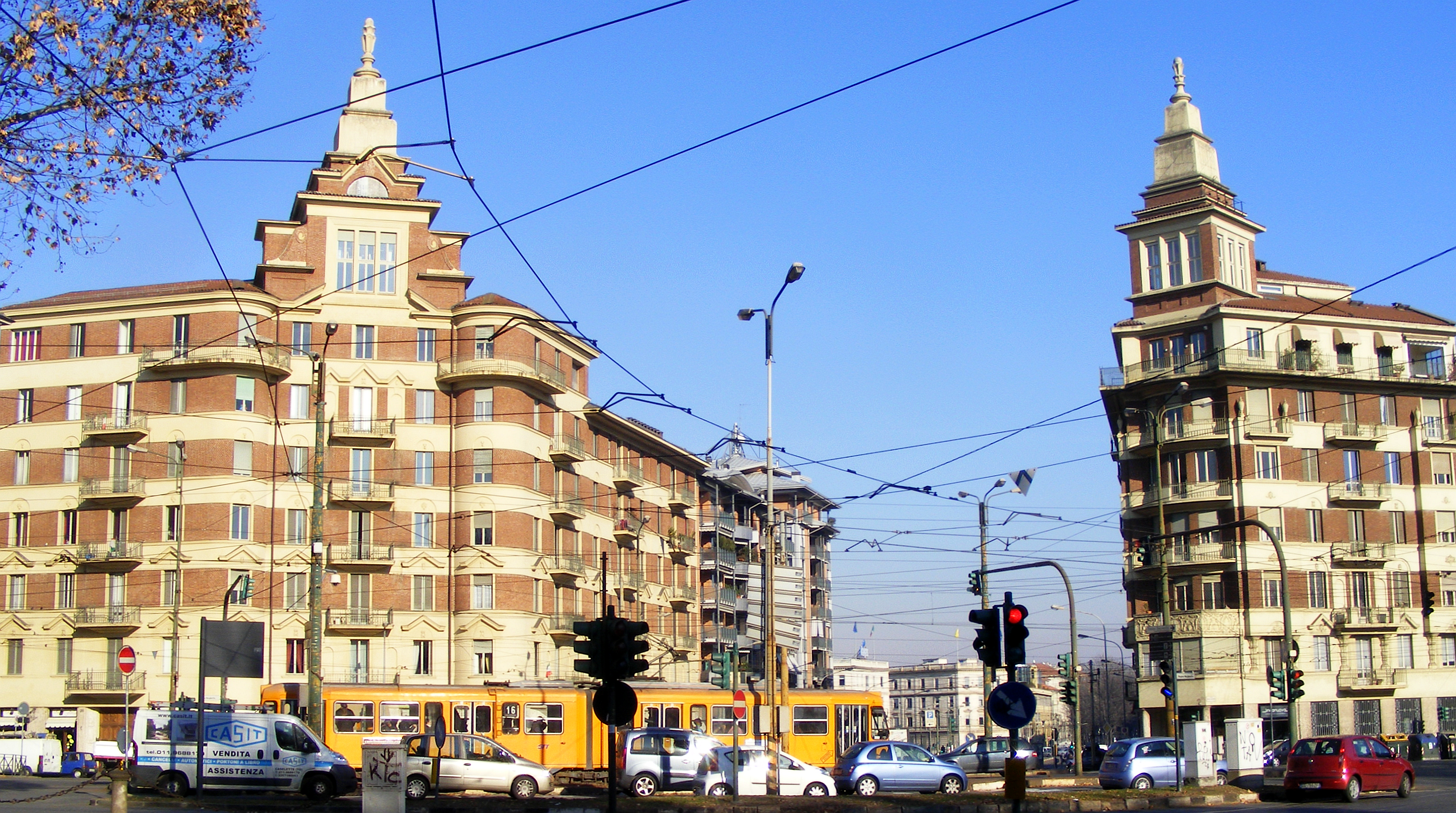
The Rivella Towers, another art deco example (1929)

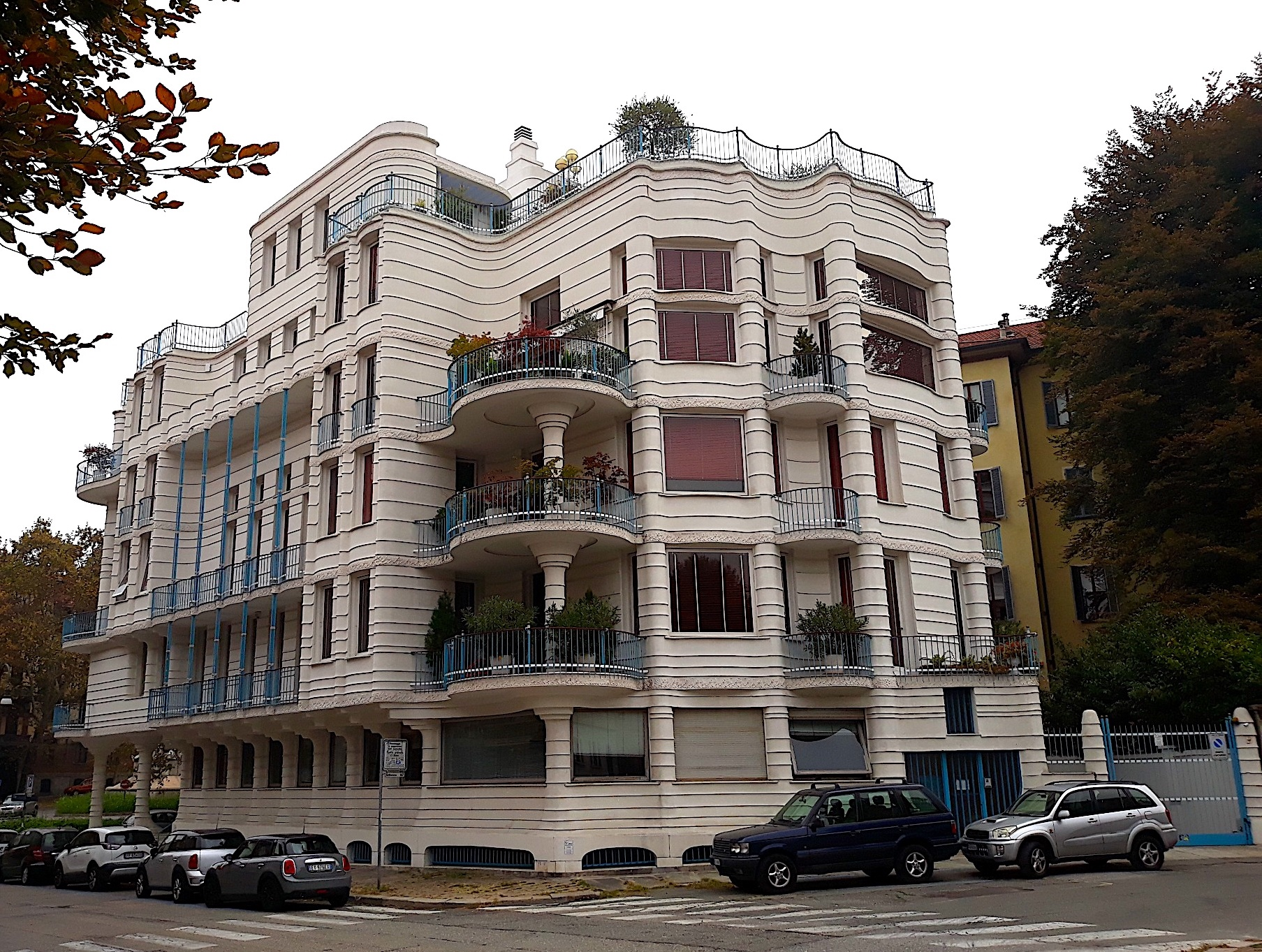
The Obelisk House (1954), at Crimea 2 Square, an example of neoliberty

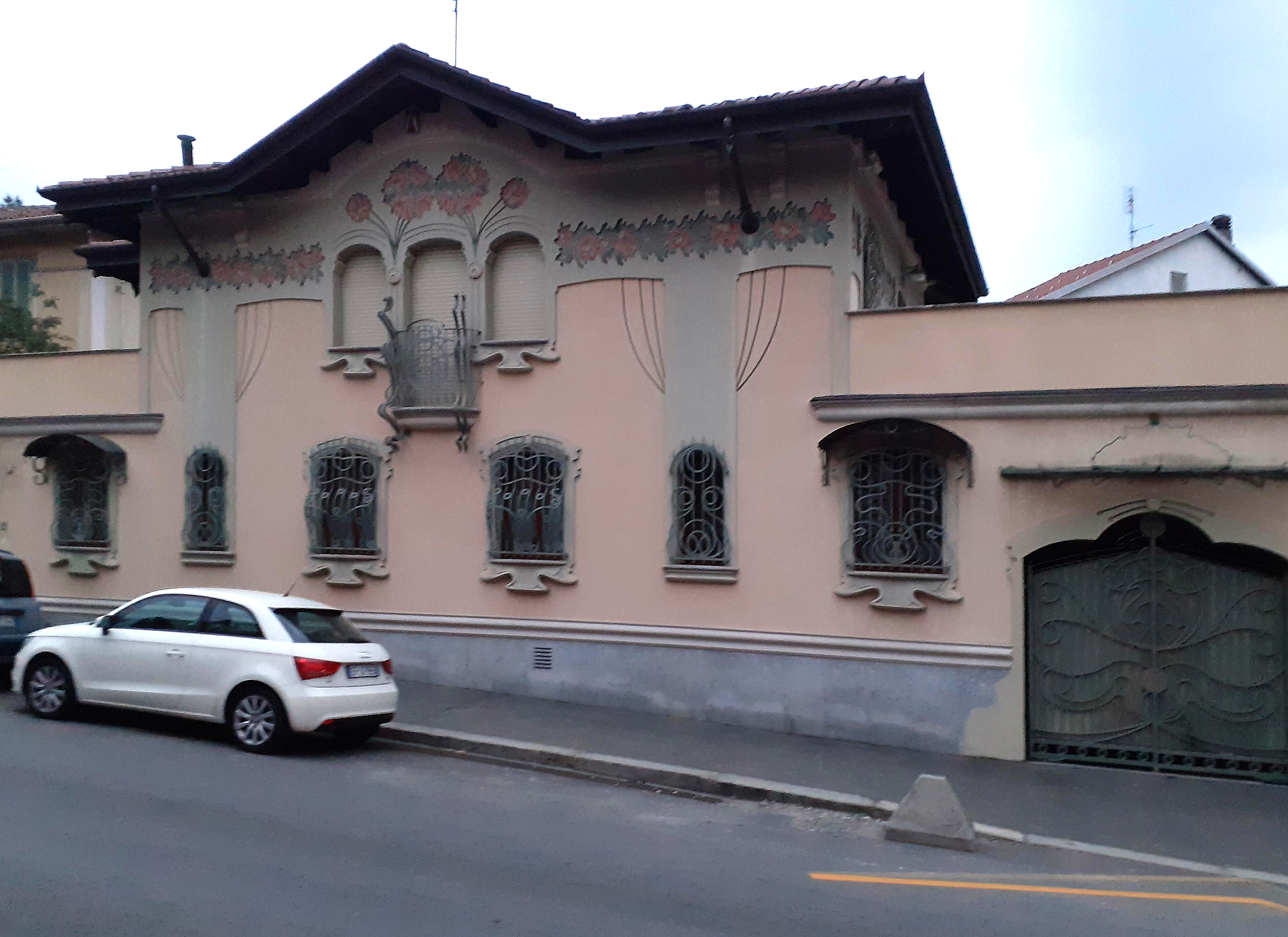
Villa Grivet Brancot (2002), on San Martino street: an example of an "architectural fake"

While the horrors of the First World War marked, not only symbolically, the end of the season of Art Nouveau, during the second decade of the twentieth century the theme of "function" prevailed over "form," and art deco was a kind of stylistic synopsis that saw its sinuous boldness transformed into more rigorous stylistic features that anticipated, if only slightly, the main features of rationalism; Turin is also home to some worthy examples of this new current.

In addition to some villas on the hillside, one of the earliest expressions of art deco architecture appeared at 62 Via Cibrario, where architect Bertola's Casa Enrieu stands: its decorative apparatus, now devoid of floral decorations, is characterized by cornices and undulating motifs alternating with flat surfaces; the same is true of the building next door, on the corner with nearby Via Bossi.

Another example of art deco was the building that was erected on the corner of Corso Vittorio Emanuele II, which was built in 1926 to a design by engineer Bonadè-Bottino to house the Palazzo del Cinema, later Cinema Corso, at the time the largest movie theater in Italy; (Note: This information can be inferred from the photograph of the time.) despite its destruction in a fire on 9 March 1980, the characteristic facade with angular access surmounted by a dome was preserved and the building was put to a different use, designed by architect Pier Paolo Maggiora. In Piazza Solferino stands another example with sober and elegant forms built in 1928 to a design by Giuseppe Momo, as the headquarters of the Società Anonima Edile Torinese.

Another Turinese author who made a name for himself for his Deco works was architect Vittorio Eugenio Ballatore of Rosana. The author of the vaguely Art Nouveau-inspired motovelodrome and the Stadium, he distinguished himself by designing the Rivella Towers, the pair of buildings placed in the eponymous widening at the intersection of Corso Regina Margherita (Note: No. 100.) and Corso Regio Parco, as well as the imposing building of the National Electrotechnical Institute "Galileo Ferraris" in Corso Massimo d'Azeglio and a group of buildings near Piazza Bernini.

=== Neoliberty and the posthumous reappraisal of Turin's Art Nouveau style ===
In the 1950s, Art Nouveau had a sort of reinterpretation by some exponents of Turinese architecture of the time including Roberto Gabetti, Aimaro Isola, Sergio Jaretti and Elio Luzi, and likewise the Milanese studio BBPR, whose reinterpretation of floral and structural stylistic features led the critic Paolo Portoghesi to define this phenomenon as neoliberty. The so-called Obelisk House by Jaretti and Luzi is emblematic, where cultured stylistic references emerge with refined irony that lead to a reinterpretation of building materials, re-proposing the use of litho-cement for decorative elements that characterize all the sinuous elevations of the building marked by overlapping horizontal reliefs that recall Gaudí's modernist morphologies.

Also in the hilly area of Borgo Po, an eccentric single-family building designed by Turin architect Alessandro Celli appeared in the early 2000s. He designed Villa Grivet Brancot for his patron in 2002, that is, an authentic "architectural fake" inspired by Turin's major Art Nouveau styles. The home of the Grivet Brancot family is characterized by a rich decorative apparatus consisting of litho-cement, cornices, decorations and wrought irons that really seem to belong to the Fenoglian repertoire but instead are the result of a careful contemporary search for workmanship and material philologically consistent with the Art Nouveau era and in perpetual homage to it.

== Buildings of major interest ==
=== Downtown ===
Building	Author	Year	Location	Note	Image (exterior)	Image (interior/detail)
Palazzo Bellia	C. Ceppi	1892–1898	via Pietro Micca 4–6	It was the first building in Turin to be constructed by the Bellia company with reinforced concrete floors and supporting structure according to the Systéme Hennebique patent.		
Palazzo Priotti	C. Ceppi	1900	corso Vittorio Emanuele II 52			
Magisterial female high school "V. Monti"	C. Dolza; G. Scanagatta	1900	corso Galileo Ferraris 11			
Casa Reda	G. Reycend	1902	via San Francesco d'Assisi 15	It was one of three "rented dwellings" commissioned by brothers Daniele and Sereno Florio.		
Casa Florio	G. Velati Bellini	1902	via San Francesco d'Assisi 17, corner of via Bertola	It was one of three "rented dwellings" commissioned by brothers Daniele and Sereno Florio.		
Rossi-Galateri Apartment Building	P. Fenoglio	1903	via Passalacqua 14			
Casa Boffa-Costa	P. Fenoglio	1903	via Papacino, corner of via Revel			
Casa Boffa-Costa-Magnani	P. Fenoglio	1904	via de Sonnaz 16			
Casa Rey	P. Fenoglio	1904	corso Galileo Ferraris 16–18			
Casa Bellia	P. Fenoglio	1904	via Papacino, corner of corso G. Matteotti			
Residential building	P. Fenoglio	1904	via Papacino 4			
Residential building	G. Gatti	1904	corso Galileo Ferraris 22			
Palazzo della Zoppa	C. A. Ceresa	1906	via Viotti 11			
Casa Fiorio (formerly Foro Frumentario)	E. Bonicelli	1906				
Casa Giraudi (or Casa Besozzi)	E. Bonelli	1906	corso G. Matteotti 5			
Casa Bonelli	Eugenio Bonelli	1906	via Papacino 8	It was the personal home of E. Bonelli.		
Casa Florio	P. Fenoglio	1907	via Monte di Pietà 26, corner of via San Francesco d'Assisi	It was one of three "rented dwellings" commissioned by brothers Daniele and Sereno Florio.		
Terrazza Solferino	Vetreria Albano&Macario	1907	via Bertolotti 7			
Caffè Baratti & Milano	G. Casanova	1909	Galleria Subalpina (piazza Castello)	In 1909, an extension was built towards Piazza Castello; the café dates back to 1875. Sculptures: E. Rubino		
Municipal tramway garages and offices	-	1899–1909	corso Regina Margherita 14			
Residential building	-	1902	via G. Rossini 12			
Residential building	-	1902	via G. Rossini 30			
Residential building	E. Mollino	1902	via G. Matteotti 44–46			

=== Crocetta area ===
Building	Author	Year	Location	Note	Image (exterior)	Image (interior/detail)
Palazzo Ceriana Mayneri	C. Ceppi	1884	corso Stati Uniti 27	Home of the famous Circolo della Stampa and not to be confused with the palace of the same name, also by Ceppi, located in Piazza Solferino.		
Casa Buzzani	P. Fenoglio	1897	via Lamarmora 31, corner of via Pastrengo			
Casa Boffa-Costa	P. Fenoglio	1901	via Sacchi 28, corner of via Legnano			
Casa Guelpa	P. Fenoglio	1903	via Colli 2			
Casa Debernardi	P. Fenoglio	1903	via Colli 2, corner of via Vela			
Casa Debernardi	P. Fenoglio	1904	via Magenta 55, corner of via Morosini			
Casa Perino	P. Fenoglio	1904	via San Secondo 70			
Public housing	P. Fenoglio	1907	via Fratelli Carle, angolo corso Galileo Ferraris			
Casa Maffei	A. Vandone di Cortemilia, G. Momo	1909	corso Montevecchio 50	Bas-reliefs: G. B. Alloati; wrought iron: A. Mazzucottelli		
Casa a Crescent	G. Vivarelli	1911	corso Re Umberto, 65–67			
Casa Lattes	G. Gallo	1911	corso Sommelier, corner of via Sacchi	Neo-Gothic building		
Casa Avezzano	P. Betta	1912	via Vico 2, corner of via Massena			
Casa Bologna	L. Peracchio	1913	via Massena 81, corner of via Filangieri			
Casa Besozzi	G. Besozzi	1904	corso Montevecchio 58	Sculptures: Realini; Lithocement decorations: Quadri; frescoes design: Casanova		
Residential building	V. E. Ballatore di Rosana	1900	via F. Cassini 21, corner of via C. Colombo			
Residential building	P. Fenoglio	1904	via Sacchi 40–42			
Residential building	G. Hendel	1908	corso De Gasperi 40			
Residential building	P. Fenoglio	1908	via Pastengo 6 corner of via Gioberti			
Residential building	G. Tirone	1905	via Morosini 14, corner of via Vela			
Residential building	–	1900	via Cassini 65			
Residential building	–	1901	via Vespucci 39			
Residential building	–	1901	via C. Colombo 3			
Residential building	-	1905	corso Galileo Ferraris 83			
Residential building	–	-	corso Castefidardo 11			
Residential building	–	-	corso Castefidardo 13			
Residential building	–	–	corso Castefidardo 17			
Casa Gotteland or Gotemann	P. Fenoglio	1900	via San Secondo 11	One of the projects carried out by P. Fenoglio in Via San Secondo		
Galileo Ferraris Monument	L. Contratti sculptor	1903	At the corner among Corso Montevecchio, corso Trieste, corso G. Ferraris	The momunent should be placed in the court of Regio Museo Indutriale University, was moved here in 1928		

=== San Donato and Cit Turin area ===
Building	Author	Year	Location	Note	Image (exterior)	Image (interior/detail)
"Faà di Bruno" Institute	P. Fenoglio	1891	via San Donato 31			
Pavilion of Pediatrics "Maria Vittoria" Hospital	P. Fenoglio	1897	via Vidua, corner of via San Donato			
Casa Padrini	P. Fenoglio	1900	via L. Cibrario 9			
Former Fiorio Tannery	P. Fenoglio	1900	via Durandi, corner of via San Donato			
Former Municipal Baths	C. Dolza	1901	via G. Saccarelli	Current Casa di Quartiere in Borgo San Donato and also popularly known as the "frog house."		
Raby cottage	P. Fenoglio; G. Gussoni; A. Mazzucotelli	1901	corso Francia 8	Current headquarters of the State Board of Dentistry.		
Casa Fenoglio-Lafleur	P. Fenoglio	1902	via Principi d'Acaja 11, corner of corso Francia	It was the personal home of Pietro Fenoglio and his family.		
Casa Pecco	P. Fenoglio	1902	via L. Cibrario 12–14, corner of via Tenivelli			
Casa Florio	G. Velati Bellini	1902	via L. Cibrario 22, corner of via G. Saccarelli			
Casa Tasca	G. B. Benazzo	1903	via Beaumont 3			
Former Metzger Brewery	P. Fenoglio	1903	via San Donato 68	Recently restored, it ceased its many years of operation in 1975. It is now home to a supermarket.		
Former Bosio & Caratsch Brewery	P. Fenoglio	1907	via Bonzanigo, corner of via Pinelli	Bosio & Caratsch was the first Italian brewery.		
Casa Macciotta	P. Fenoglio	1904	corso Francia 32			
Casa Balbis	P. Fenoglio	1900	via Balbis 1			
Perosino-Gavosto apartment building	P. Saccarelli	1905	via L. Cibrario 29			
Casa Ina	P. Fenoglio	1906	via Principi d'Acaja 20			
Casa Girardi	P. Fenoglio	1906	via L. Cibrario 54, corner of via Durandi			
Casa Zorzi	A. Vandone di Cortemilia	1905–1909	corso Francia 19			
Casa Masino	P. Fenoglio; G. Gribodo	1906	via Piffetti 7			
Casa Baravalle	A. Rigotti	1906	via Vassalli Eandi 18, corner of via Principi d'Acaja			
Casa Azimonti	P. Saccarelli	1906	via L. Cibrario 49			
Residential building	G. Gribodo	1908	via Piffetti, 12			
Residential building	G. Gribodo	1908	via Piffetti, 10			
Residential building	G. Gribodo	1908	via Piffetti, 3			
Giordanino apartment building	P. Saccarelli	1908	via L. Cibrario 32			
Casa Verna	G. Vivarelli	1906	via L. Cibrario 36			
Casa Rama	P. Fenoglio	1909	via L. Cibrario 63–65, corner of via Peyron	The poet Guido Gozzano lived and died in this building.		
Casa Grometto	G. Momo	1911	via L. Cibrario 26–28			
Casa Marchisio	A. Tioli	1914	via Piffetti 42			
Residential building	A. Vandone di Cortemilia	1912	via Duchessa Jolanda 19–21			
Residential building	G. Gussoni; A. Vivarelli	1914	via Duchessa Jolanda 17			
Casa Talucchi	G. Gribodo	–	via M. Schina 3, corner of via Talucchi			
Casa del Faro	–	–	via Palmieri 46, via Duchessa Jolanda	Erected by Cav. G. B. Carrera		
Residential building	–	–	via Principi d’Acaja 44, corner of via Le Chiuse			
Residential building	–	–	via Principi d’Acaja 8	Current Hotel Principi d'Acaja		
Residential building	–	–	via Principi d’Acaja 12			
Residential building	A. Tioli	–	via Cibrario 58			
Residential building	–	–	via Bossi 6, corner of via Le Chiuse			
Residential building	C. Sgarbi	–	via Bossi 4			
Residential building	–	–	via Le Chiuse 85			
Residential building	–	–	via Cibrario 31			
Residential building	–	–	via Cibrario 33 bis			
Residential building	–	–	via Cibrario 60			
Casa Enrieu	Bertola	1914	via Cibrario 62	Deco building		
Residential building	–	–	via Saccarelli 9			
Residential building	–	–	via Le Chiuse 23			
Residential building	–	–	corso Francia 91, corner of via Saffi			
Residential building	–	–	via Vagnone 7			
Residential building	–	–	piazza Peyron 22–24			
Residential building	–	–	via Peyron 7			
Residential building	L. Cantore	1911	corso Principe Oddone 27			
Residential building	A. E. Barberis	1913	corso Umbria 2			
Residential building	–	–	corso Regina Margherita 171			
Residential building	–	–	corso Regina Margherita 176			
Residential building	P. Saccarelli	–	corso Regina Margherita 195, corner of via Sobrero			
Residential building	–	1913	corso Regina Margherita 195, corner of via Sobrero			
Residential building	–	1906	corso Regina Margherita 214			
Residential building	–	1910	corso Regina Margherita 218 bis			
Residential building	–	1906	corso Regina Margherita 218			
Former Pastiglie Leone factory	G. Witzel	1904	corso Regina Margherita 242			
Formerly Villa Caratsch	P. Fenoglio	1906	corso Regina Margherita, corner of via Bonzanigo			
Casa della Vittoria	G. Gussoni	1918–1920	corso Francia 23	Neo-Gothic building		

=== San Salvario and Valentino Park area ===
Building	Author	Year	Location	Note	Image (exterior)	Image (interior/detail)
Casa Bioletti	P. Fenoglio	1899	via Valperga Caluso 9			
Menzio apartment building	A. Premoli	1900	via G. Donizetti 22	It currently houses the Eden Hotel.		
Residential building (canopy)	-	–	via G. Donizetti 26			
Casa Marangoni	D. Donghi; L. Parocchia	1901	via Tiziano 17, corner of via Nizza			
Villa Javelli	R. D'Aronco	1904	via F. Petrarca 44	Villa built by Raimondo D'Aronco.		
Kind cottage	M. A. Frapolli	1904	via V. Monti 48	A cottage commissioned by Swiss industrialist Adolf Kind, the first Italian skier and founder of Italy's first Ski Club.		
Casa Audino-Rinaldi	P. Fenoglio	1905	via Madama Cristina 78, corner of via G. Donizetti			
Former FIAT plant	A. Premoli	1904–1906	via corso Dante Alighieri 100, corner of via Marocchetti and via Chiabrera	It was Fiat's first plant.		
Former FIAT Student Institute Headquarters	G. Mattè Trucco	1906	corso Dante Alighieri 102, corner of via Chiabrera			
Former Ceirano Workshops	–	1906	corso Raffaello 18			
Residential building	M. Bonelli	1906	via Saluzzo 83, corner of via G. Donizetti			
Residential building (Portone del Melograno)	P. Fenoglio	1907	via G. Argentero, 4			
Former Municipal Baths San Salvario Neighborhood House	C. Dolza	1905	via O. Morgari 10			
Casa Sigismondi	G. Momo	1912	via Madama Cristina 5			
Residential building	G. Gallo	1913	via Nizza 43			
Residential building	P. Fenoglio	–	via Valperga Caluso 4 and 6			
Residential building	-	–	via G. Bidone 5			
Residential building	–	–	via Belfiore 66			
Residential building	P. Fenoglio	–	via Belfiore 67			
Residential building	–	–	via P. Giuria 25			
Residential building	-	–	via P. Giuria 38			
Residential building	–	–	via P. Giuria 40, corner of via V. Monti			
Residential building	–	–	via Saluzzo 85			
Residential building	–	–	via Saluzzo 98			
Residential building	–	–	via Saluzzo 115			
Residential building	-	–	via Madama Cristina 65, corner of via Valperga Caluso			
Residential building	P. Fenoglio	–	via Madama Cristina 78			
Residential building	-	–	via Madama Cristina 119			
Residential building	–	–	via U. Foscolo 7			
Chiesa del Sacro Cuore di Maria		1890				

=== San Paolo area ===
Building	Author	Year	Location	Note	Image (exterior)	Image (interior/detail)
"Santorre di Santarosa" School	C. Dolza	1901	via Braccini 70			
Former plant Diatto Anonymous Company – A. Clément	P. Fenoglio	1905	via Moretta 55			
Casa Bosco	G. Gribodo	1907	via Perosa 56			
Case SCAC	G. Gribodo	1907	via Polonghera 47–49			
Residential building	A. E. Barberis	1910	via D. Di Nanni 61			
Residential building	–	–	via D. Di Nanni 63			
Residential building	–	–	via D. Di Nanni 63/a			
Former Lancia plant	M. A. Frapolli	1919	corso Racconigi, corner of corso Peschiera			
Residential building	–	–	corso Ferrucci 2			
Residential building	–	–	corso Ferrucci 23			
Residential building	–	–	Cantalupo private passage 26			

=== Santa Rita area ===
Building	Author	Year	Location	Note	Image (exterior)	Image (interior/detail)
Residential building	–	–	corso Orbassano 108, corner of via Caprera			

=== Aurora, Borgo Rossini and Valdocco area ===
Building	Author	Year	Location	Note	Image (exterior)	Image (interior/detail)
Residential building	–	–	corso Regina Margherita 167			
Former Officine Meccaniche Michele Ansaldi, then Officine Grandi Motori	P. Fenoglio, G. Mattè Trucco	1899/1929	via L. Damiano, via Cuneo, corso Vercelli, corso Vigevano			
Council Houses (Case Popolari IACP)	G. Fochesato	1908	via L. Damiano, via Cuneo 30, via Schio, via Pinerolo	The first council houses of Turin, built by IACT (council house institute)		
Residential building	G. Molinari, G. Buzzi	1911-1912	via L. Damiano 11			
Residential building	A. Tioli	1913-1915	via Pinerolo 45			
Former wallpaper factory formerly owned by Barone e Figli	P. Fenoglio, structures: G. A. Porcheddu	1907	corso Vigevano 38	Art Nouveau elements are particularly evident in the wrought ironwork		
Former sphaeristerium Giuoco Boccie*.	De Vecchi	1905	via Cigna 50, corner of via del Fortino	*The building bears an archaism and/or error in the embossed inscription "boccie," whose current correct wording is "bocce."		
Former Ballada Foundries Plant	P. Fenoglio	1906	via Foggia 21			
Former Oreste Colongo Woolen Mill	G. Momo	1908	via Cagliari 42	Current headquarters of the Torino Film Commission.		
Casa Colongo	A. Vandone di Cortemilia	1904	via Catania 35	It consisted of the home and workshop of the blacksmith Colongo. Wrought iron: Colongo		
Residential building	P. Fenoglio	-	corso Brescia 5 bis			
Residential building	C. Gay	1902	via Alessandria 19			
Rivella Towers	E. Ballatore di Rosana	1929	largo Rivella	commonly referred to as sugar bowls		

=== Barriera di Milano and Rebaudengo Area ===
Building	Author	Year	Location	Note	Image (exterior)	Image (interior/detail)
Residential building	A. E. Barberis	1913	Via Ceresole, 2			
Residential buildings	C. Sgarbi	1912	via Belmonte 7 -9- 11			
Residential building	A. E. Barberis	1912	via Belmonte 2			
Residential building	A. Baggio	1915	corso Vercelli 101			
Residential building	Eugenio Bonelli	1911	corso Vercelli 108	Eugenio Bonelli is probably a relative of Enrico, another art nouveau designer		
Residential builidngs for STIGE workers	G. Ellena, S. Conti, M. Merlo Pich	1911	corso Vercelli 110			
Residential building	A. E. Barberis	1913	corso Vercelli 107			
Residential building	C. Operti	1912	corso Vercelli 109			
Residential building	C. Sgarbi, Gatti	1912-1913	corso Vercelli 119			
Residential building	-	-	via Martorelli 63	The balconies have the same decorations of the building in corso Vercelli 101		
Residential building	-	-	via Martorelli 5			
A. Gabelli Elementary School	C. Dolza	1915	via Santhià 25			
Residential building	Augusto Artom	1914	via Scarlatti 1			
Residential building	G. Bollino	1912	Piazza Conti di Rebaudengo 27			

=== Northwest Area (Campidoglio, Borgo Vittoria and Lucento) ===
Building	Author	Year	Location	Note	Image (exterior)	Image (interior/detail)
Residential building	-	-	via Corio, corner of via Balme			
Residential building	-	-	via Pianezza 81/e			
Former Boero Tannery	P. Fenoglio	1905	via del Ridotto 5	It is now the headquarters of the ENAIP training institution and has undergone extensive renovations.		
Villa Ponchia	-	-	via Borgaro 128			

=== Hillside area (Borgo Po) ===
Building	Author	Year	Location	Note	Image (exterior)	Image (interior/detail)
Giuliano cottage	G. Gribodo	1901	via Gatti 7			
Villa Scott	P. Fenoglio	1902	corso G. Lanza 57			
Foà-Levi cottage	G. Velati Bellini	1904	via Bezzecca 11			
Casa Pasquetti	Q. Grupallo	1905	via Bezzecca 12			
Circolo Eridano	G. Velati Bellini	1911	corso Moncalieri 88			
Casa Mussini	E. Ferrari	1914	via Mancini 22			
Residential building	–	–	via Mancini 15			
Residential building	G. Gribodo	1900	via Asti 41			
Residential building	E. Mollino	1905	via Asti 36			
Residential building	–	1914	via Castelnuovo, corner of piazza Gozzano			
Obelisk House	Sergio Jaretti Sodano, Elio Luzi	1959	Crimea Square 2	Example of neoliberty		
Villa Grivet Brancot	Alessandro Celli	2002	Val San Martino Communal Road			
Residential building	–	–	via L. Manara, 19			
Residential building	G.B. Benazzo	1910	corso G. Lanza 86 – 88			

== See also ==
- Art Nouveau
- Pietro Fenoglio
- Raimondo D'Aronco
- Casa Fenoglio-Lafleur
- Villa Scott

== Bibliography ==
- AA.VV. (1980). L'Architettura Italiana. Torino: Torino città viva.
- AA.VV. (1898). L'Arte all'Esposizione del 1898. Torino.
- AA.VV. (1984). Beni culturali ambientali nel Comune di Torino. Torino: Politecnico di Torino Dipartimento Casa-Città, Società degli Ingegneri e degli Architetti in Torino.
- AA.VV. (1902). Prima esposizione internazionale d'arte decorativa moderna, Torino 1902. Torino.
- AA.VV. (1997). La Nuova enciclopedia dell'arte. Milano: Garzanti.
- AA.VV. (1994). Torino, 1902: le Arti Decorative Internazionali nel Nuovo Secolo. Milano: Fabbri Editori.
- R. Banham (April 1959). "Neo Liberty - The Italian retreat from modern architecture". Architectural Review. Londra.
- Rossana Bossaglia (1997). Il Liberty in Italia. Milano: Charta.
- G. Caponetti (2013). Quando l'automobile uccise la cavalleria. Milano: Marcos y Marcos.
- B. Coda N.; R. Fraternali; C. L. Ostorero (2017). Torino Liberty. 10 passeggiate nei quartieri della città. Torino: Edizioni del Capricorno.
- G. Fahr-Becker (1999). Art Nouveau. Milano: Könemann.
- C. Fiell e P. Fiell (2000). Design del XX secolo. Köln: Taschen.
- M. Leva Pistoi (1969). Mezzo secolo di architettura 1865-1915. Dalle suggestioni post-risorgimentali ai fermenti del nuovo secolo. Torino: Tipografia Torinese.
- R. Nelva; B. Signorelli (1990). Avvento ed evoluzione del calcestruzzo armato in Italia: il sistema Hennebique. Milano: Edizioni di scienza e tecnica.
- R. Nelva; B. Signorelli (1979). Le opere di Pietro Fenoglio nel clima dell'Art Nouveau internazionale. Bari: Dedalo.
- F. Ogliari; R. Bagnera (2006). Milano liberty. Pavia: Edizioni Selecta.
- G.A. Porcheddu (1909). Elenco dei lavori eseguiti in calcestruzzo armato, sistema Hennebique, dal 1895 a tutto il 1909. Torino: Società Porcheddu ing. G.A.
- G.A. Porcheddu (1911). Il Ponte del Risorgimento attraverso il Tevere in Roma in calcestruzzo armato sistema Hennebique / proposto, progettato e costruito dalla Società Porcheddu. Roma: Società Porcheddu ing. G.A.
- P. Portoghesi (1998). I grandi architetti del Novecento. Roma: Newton&Compton.
- E. Rizzo; Maria Cristina Sirchia (2008). Liberty - Album del nuovo stile. Palermo: Dario Flaccovio Editore.
- P. Scarzella (1995). Torino nell'Ottocento e nel Novecento. Ampliamenti e trasformazioni entro la cerchia dei corsi napoleonici. Torino: Celid.
- B. Zevi (1979). "L'andropausa degli architetti moderni italiani". Editoriali di architettura. Torino: Einaudi.
