= Chiesa del Sacro Cuore di Maria =

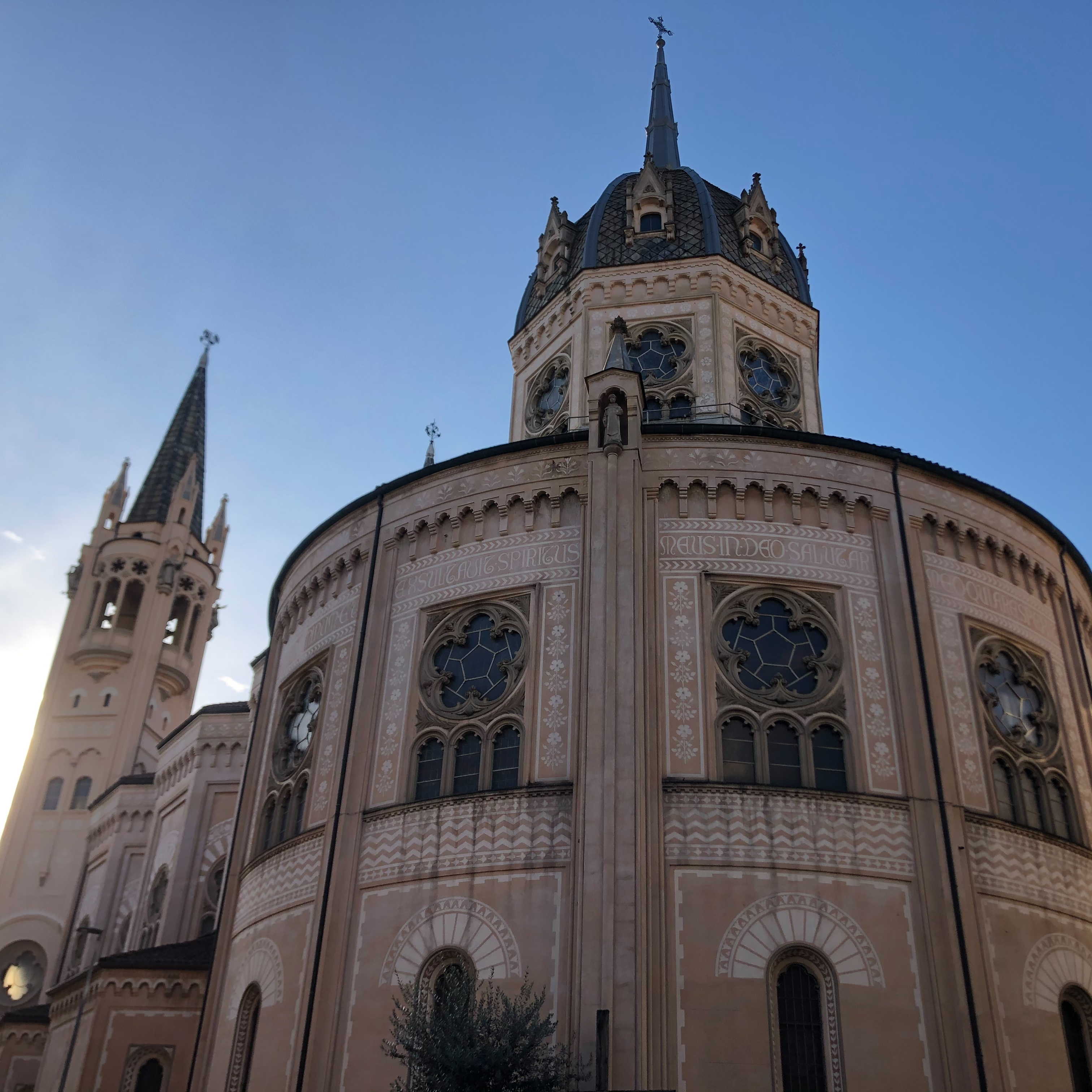
- Chiesa del Sacro Cuore di Maria
- 45.05484°N 7.67845°E
- Country: Italy
- Denomination: Catholic Church
- Website: donboscosansalvario.it

Architecture
- Architect: Carlo Ceppi
- Architectural type: Neoclassical style
- Years built: 1890–1898

The Chiesa del Sacro Cuore di Maria ("Church of the Sacred Heart of Mary") is a church in Turin, Italy located in the San Salvario district.

== History ==
The Chiesa del Sacro Cuore di Maria began with the work of architect Carlo Ceppi and engineer Steano Molli in 1884, with construction taking place between 1890 and 1898. The church was dedicated to the Sacred Hearth of Mary in October 1890. The sanctuary became a parish in 1910 and the interior was covered in green stone from Tenda.

The dome of the church was damaged on 13 July 1943, when it was directly hit by a large caliber bomb during the Second World War. The damage included the roof, scaffolding, the main altar, and the 6,000-pipe organ which was destroyed, leaving only the facade and perimeter walls.

Reconstruction of the church took place between 1947 and 1955.
