= Church of Jesus of Nazareth, Turin =

Chiesa di Gesù Nazareno (Church of Jesus of Nazareth)
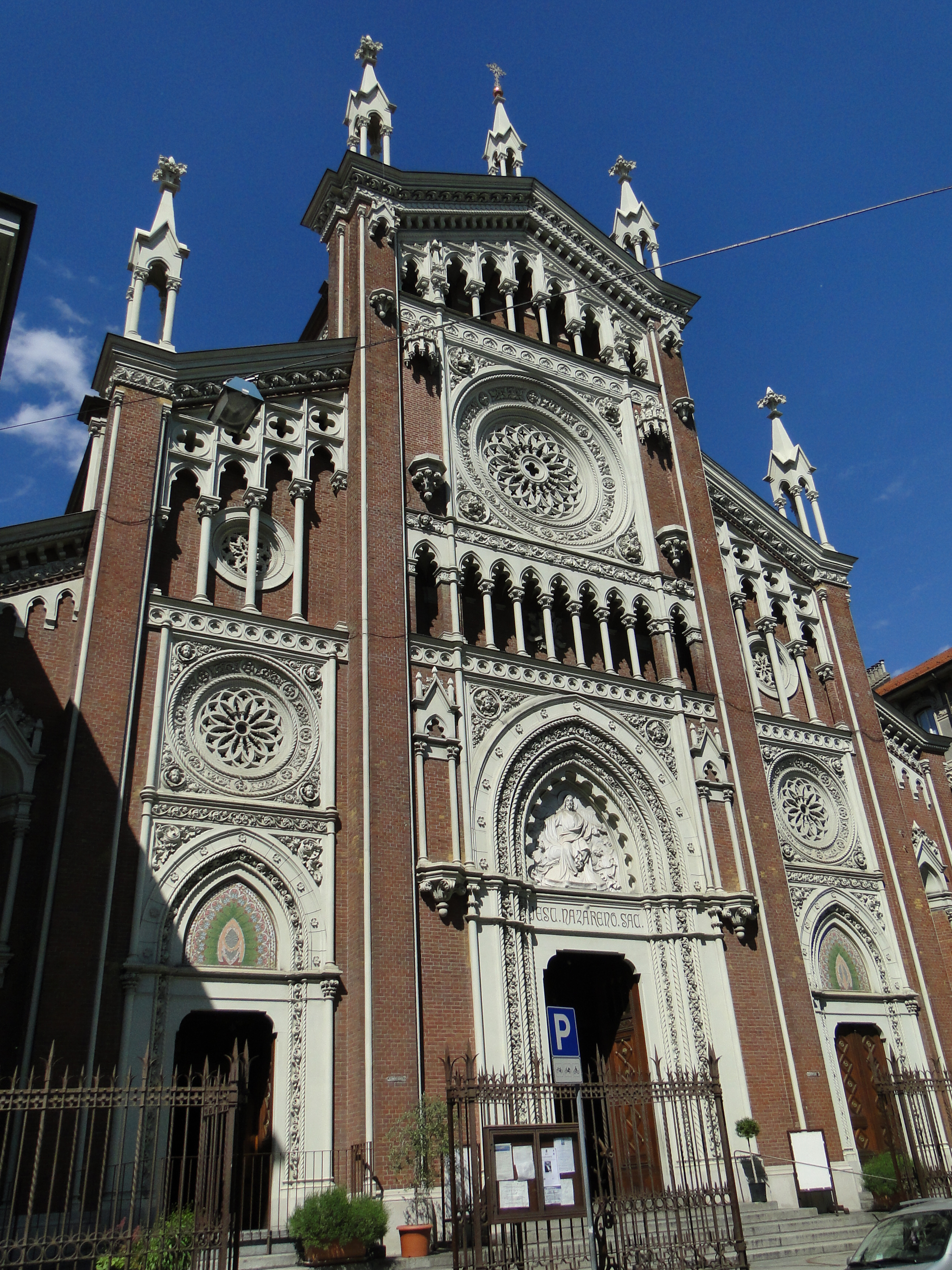
- Interactive map of Chiesa di Gesù Nazareno (Church of Jesus of Nazareth)

General information
- Type: Church (Catholic)
- Architectural style: Gothic Revival
- Location: Piazza Benefica, Turin, Piedmont, Italy
- Coordinates: 45°4′28″N 7°39′43″E
- Completed: 1929

Design and construction
- Architects: Giovanni and Bartolomeo Gallo

References
- museoTorino,

The Church of Jesus of Nazareth, Turin (Italian: Chiesa di Gesù Nazareno) is a Catholic church in the Cit Turin district of central Turin, Piedmont, Italy, designed by Giovanni and Bartolomeo Gallo and built between 1904 and 1929 on the Piazza Benefica.

== History ==
The church was created after the Church of San Martiniano–located in a different district of the city–was demolished to make way for the route of the Via Pietro Micca. It was to be located “beyond the Piazza Statuto, along the Via Francia.”

The first stone of the church was laid on 24 November 1904 and construction was completed by the contractor Pier Vincanzo Bella. Though the vaults of the nave were not yet completed, the church was consecrated on 24 May 1913 by Cardinal Agostino Richelmy, Archbishop of Turin.

It was mostly untouched by the bombings of November 1942 and February 1943, which instead heavily damaged the Porta Susa station (as well as the Cit Turin district in general).

In the mid-1950s, the Cinema Teatro Esedra (now located at Via Pietro Bagetti, 30) was opened in the basement of the church. These spaces were temporarily closed beginning on 10 March 2020; between 1983–93 they had been closed due to not meeting the new public safety ordinances adopted after the fire to the Cinema Statuto. It is currently used as originally designed, as a parish church with an attached rectory.

== Architecture ==
The church represents one of the few cases in which Gallo chose stylistic references alien to the regional tradition in Piedmont (the last time was for the competition of the Basilica of San Petronio); most of his previous buildings, by contrast, have facades characterized by a plethora of plastic, three-dimensional ornament, as opposed to the large-scale integration of the ornament into the planes of the exposed brick system here.

The structure, which uses a Latin cross plan and a nave flanked by side aisles, has cross vaults supported by stout pillars. This is similar to Gallo's previous work at the parish Church of San Orbanasso. It is one of the best-preserved Gallian spaces, as the wall decor is almost entirely intact, especially that of the presbytery and the apse. Also particularly well-preserved are the furnishings as well as the wooden pulpit, which recalls the one made for the Church of Santo Stefano in Priocca..”

== Bibliography ==
- “Le fondamenta di una nuova chiesa,” in La Stampa, 24 November 1904.
- Per la nuova chiesa parrocchiale. Monumento-omaggio a Gesù Nazareno nel XX secolo. Turin, 1913. p. 2.
- Politecnico di Torino, Dipartimento Casa Città, Beni culturali ambiantale vel Comune di Torino, vol. 1. Turin: Società degli ingegneri e degli architetti in Torino, 1984. p. 387.
- “Le chiese di Torino danneggiate dalla guerra.” In Torino: Rivista mensile municipale vol. 25, no. 8 (August 1949). p. 14.
- Volpiano, M. Giuseppe Gallo. L'Architettura sacra in Piemonte tra Ottocento e Novecento. Turin: Allemandi, 2002. pp. 119–20.
