= Marinella Mazzanti =

Italian chemist

Professor Marinella Mazzanti
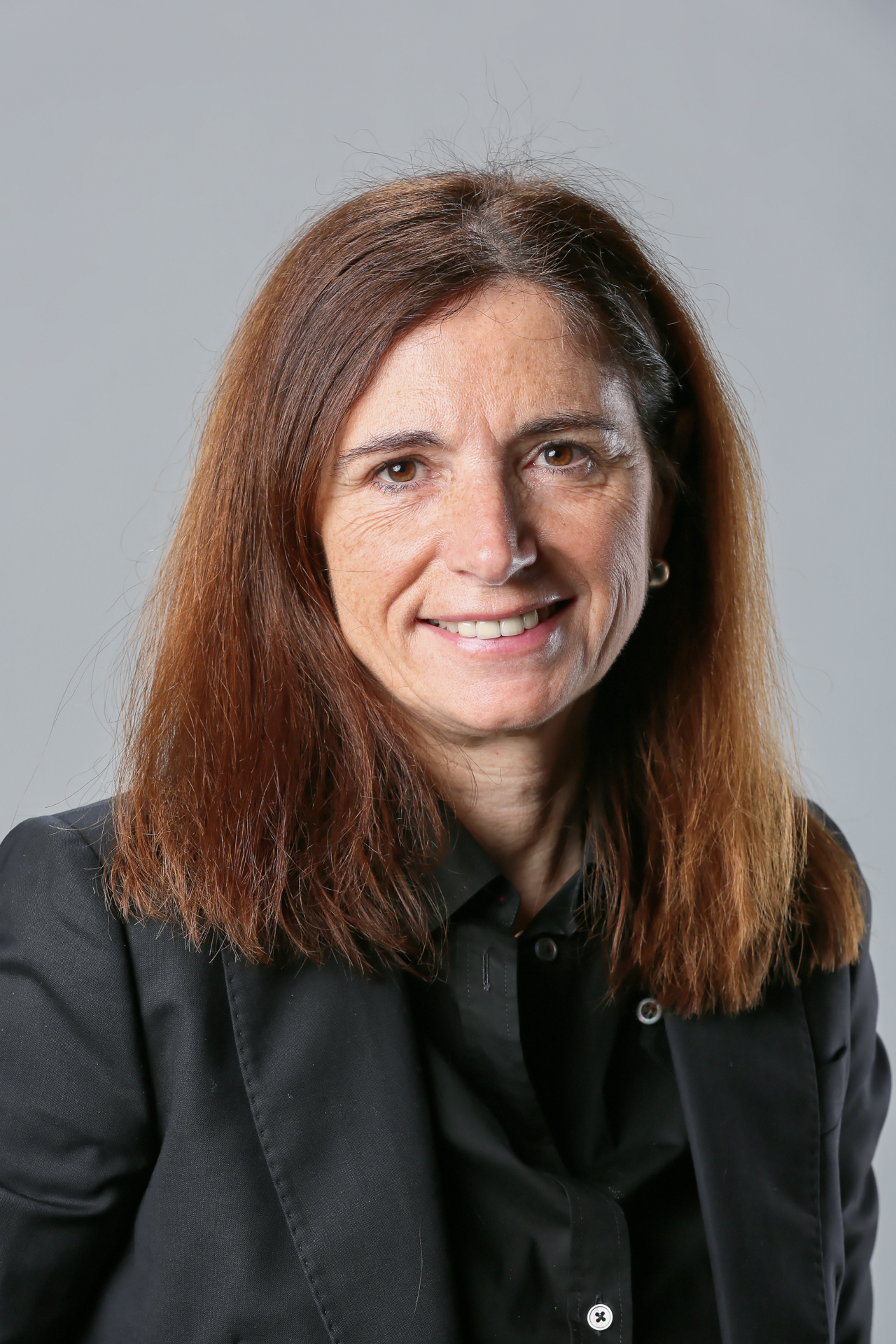
- Marinella Mazzanti in 2020
- Born: October 12, 1959 (age 67); Vinci, Tuscany, Italy
- Citizenship: Italian
- Known for: Chemistry of f-block elements Uranium chemistry in unusual oxidation states
- Title: Professor
- Spouse: Lyndon Emsley

Academic background
- Education: Chemistry
- Alma mater: University of Pisa; University of Lausanne
- Thesis: Coordination Chemistry of Vanadium (III) and Vanadium (II) (1990)
- Doctoral advisor: Carlo Floriani
- Other advisors: Alan L. Balch; Jean-Claude Marchon

Academic work
- Discipline: Chemistry
- Sub-discipline: Inorganic chemistry
- Institutions: EPFL (École Polytechnique Fédérale de Lausanne)
- Main interests: Lanthanide and Actinide coordination and supramolecular chemistry Redox reactivity of low valent f-block elements Single molecule magnets Small molecule activation Dinitrogen reduction and functionalization
- Website: https://www.epfl.ch/labs/gcc/

Marinella Mazzanti (born in Vinci, Tuscany, Italy) is an Italian inorganic chemist specialized in coordination chemistry. She is a professor at EPFL (École Polytechnique Fédérale de Lausanne) and the head of the group of Coordination Chemistry at EPFL's School of Basic Sciences.

== Career ==
After obtaining her "Diploma di Maturità Classica"(Bachelor) from the Liceo Virgilio in Empoli in 1978, Mazzanti studied inorganic chemistry at the University of Pisa and made her master's degree ("Laurea in Chimica") in 1985. She then joined Carlo Floriani at the University of Lausanne as a doctoral student to work low-valent vanadium chemistry. In 1990, she graduated with a PhD (with honors) for her thesis on "Coordination Chemistry of Vanadium (III) and Vanadium (II)." From 1989 to 1991, she was a lecturer in chemistry at the University of Lausanne. She spent one year as a postdoctoral fellow at the University of California, Berkeley working, before joining Alan L. Balch at University of California, Davis for one year to do research on transition metal chemistry. She received a Marie-Curie fellowship to work on metalloporphyrin chemistry at the French Alternative Energies and Atomic Energy Commission (CEA) in Grenoble with Jean-Claude Marchon. From 1996 to 2014, she held position first as research scientist and then as a research director at the same institution while working on f-block elements chemistry.

In 2014 she joined the EPFL faculty as professor and head of the Group of Coordination Chemistry .

== Research ==
Mazzanti's research focuses on research in inorganic chemistry synthesis and the development of new molecules with novel properties and reactivities. Her research ranges from the development of lanthanide based luminescent and magnetic tags for bioanalytical and counterfeiting applications, to the design of actinide based molecular magnets and to small molecule activation by complexes of f-block and d-block metals.

Among her scientific achievements are the development of highly luminescent lanthanide complexes that provided insight into structure-properties relationships and enabled applications in bio-analysis and in material science, and the establishment of the first synthetic pathway to stable pentavalent uranyl complexes that led to the development of the first examples of uranium based exchange-coupled single molecules magnets.

She is also interested in the design of low-valent complexes of f-block elements, particularly of uranium based transformation processes of small molecules such as dinitrogen, carbon dioxide and carbon monoxide into compounds with higher value.

On example is her identification of polymetallic architectures that facilitate the cleavage of dinitrogen and its subsequent utilization in synthesis coupled with carbon dioxide, protons or carbon monoxide. Such polymetallic architectures based on f-block elements involve multimetallic and ligand-metal cooperativity, and allow for the extension of this concept to other transition metals.

== Distinctions ==
Mazzanti is the recipient of the 2023 LeCoq de Boisbaudran award in f-elements chemistry Mazzanti is the recipient of the 2021 ACS Albert Cotton award in synthetic inorganic chemistry. She was 2019 Randolph T. Major Lecturer at the University of Connecticut, 2016 Rubin Colloquium Technion Lecturer at the Israel Institute of Technology in Haifa, and 2009 Glenn T. Seaborg Memorial Lecturer at University of California, Berkeley. In 1994 she was awarded with the Marie Skłodowska-Curie Fellowship.

Mazzanti has been a member of editorial board of Helvetica Chimica Acta (since 2017), editorial board of Dalton Transaction (since 2017), and advisory board of Inorganic Chemistry (2011-2014).

She was a member of the management committee of the European Network COST D-38, of the international organizing committee of the Rare Earth Research Conference and of the Actinides international conference. She was a coordinator of Agence nationale de la recherche (ANR) and Swiss National Science Foundation (SNFS) funded projects.

== Selected works ==
- Mazzanti, Marinella; Wietzke, Raphaël; Pécaut, Jacques; Latour, Jean-Marc; Maldivi, Pascale; Remy, Michael (2002). "Structural and Density Functional Studies of Uranium(III) and Lanthanum(III) Complexes with a Neutral Tripodal N-Donor Ligand Suggesting the Presence of a U−N Back-Bonding Interaction". Inorganic Chemistry. 41 (9): 2389–2399. doi:10.1021/ic010839v. PMID 11978104.
- Nocton, Grégory; Pécaut, Jacques; Mazzanti, Marinella (2008). "A Nitrido-Centered Uranium Azido Cluster Obtained from a Uranium Azide". Angewandte Chemie International Edition. 47 (16): 3040–3042. doi:10.1002/anie.200705742. PMID 18330879.
- Mougel, Victor; Chatelain, Lucile; Pécaut, Jacques; Caciuffo, Roberto; Colineau, Eric; Griveau, Jean-Christophe; Mazzanti, Marinella (2012). "Uranium and manganese assembled in a wheel-shaped nanoscale single-molecule magnet with high spin-reversal barrier". Nature Chemistry. 4 (12): 1011–1017. Bibcode:2012NatCh...4.1011M. doi:10.1038/nchem.1494. PMID 23174981.
- Nocton, Grégory; Horeglad, Pawel; Pécaut, Jacques; Mazzanti, Marinella (2008). "Polynuclear Cation−Cation Complexes of Pentavalent Uranyl: Relating Stability and Magnetic Properties to Structure". Journal of the American Chemical Society. 130 (49): 16633–16645. doi:10.1021/ja804766r. PMID 19049459.
- Natrajan, Louise; Burdet, Fabien; Pécaut, Jacques; Mazzanti, Marinella (2006). "Synthesis and Structure of a Stable Pentavalent-Uranyl Coordination Polymer". Journal of the American Chemical Society. 128 (22): 7152–7153. doi:10.1021/ja0609809. PMID 16734455.
- Mougel, Victor; Camp, Clément; Pécaut, Jacques; Copéret, Christophe; Maron, Laurent; Kefalidis, Christos E.; Mazzanti, Marinella (2012). "Siloxides as Supporting Ligands in Uranium(III)-Mediated Small-Molecule Activation". Angewandte Chemie International Edition. 51 (49): 12280–12284. doi:10.1002/anie.201206955. PMID 23125165.
- Falcone, Marta; Chatelain, Lucile; Scopelliti, Rosario; Živković, Ivica; Mazzanti, Marinella (2017). "Nitrogen reduction and functionalization by a multimetallic uranium nitride complex" (PDF). Nature. 547 (7663): 332–335. Bibcode:2017Natur.547..332F. doi:10.1038/nature23279. PMID 28726827. S2CID 4407384.
- Palumbo, Chad T.; Zivkovic, Ivica; Scopelliti, Rosario; Mazzanti, Marinella (2019). "Molecular Complex of Tb in the +4 Oxidation State" (PDF). Journal of the American Chemical Society. 141 (25): 9827–9831. doi:10.1021/jacs.9b05337. PMID 31194529. S2CID 189814301.
