= Angelo Torricelli =

Italian architect (born 1946)

- Born: 13 March 1946 (age 79); Milan, Italy
- Occupation: Architect
- Practice: Torricelli Associati

Angelo Torricelli (born 1946 in Milan, Italy) is an Italian architect.

== Biography ==
Torricelli was born in Milan in 1946. He graduated from Polytechnic University of Milan's Faculty of Architecture in 1969. Full professor in Architectural composition, he has been dean of the Faculty (whereupon School) of Civil Architecture of the Polytechnic University of Milan from 2008 until 2015; from 2011 until 2016 he has been head of the Architecture Board of the Polytechnic University of Milan.

He also taught at the University of Palermo's Faculty of Architecture and during Università Iuav di Venezia's summer workshops of Architectural Design. He has been visiting professor on occasion of the international architectural and urban design Seminar in Bergamo, Parma, Salsomaggiore Terme, Vigevano; at the international museography design Seminar at Hadrian's Villa and for the advanced course "Cultura del progetto in ambito archeologico" of the Roma Tre University; at the international architecture workshops in Naples, Athens, Alexandria, Beirut.

From 2000 he was a member of the Doctorate school in Architectural Composition's teacher college and, from 2013, of the Doctorate School of Architecture, Built environment and Construction engineering, both at Polytechnic University of Milan. From 2007 is a member of the scientific committee and teacher at the Itinerant master's degree Program promoted by Accademia Adrianea di Architettura e Archeologia. From 2012 he is coordinator of the territorial Lab of Milan-Bergamo's metropolitan area within the project "QVQC. Quale velocità/Quale città", sponsored by Ferrovie dello Stato Italiane. From 2010 until 2013 he has been head of the mission "Program for the Urban quality in Guangdong Province", China; in 2014 scientific manager of the "Construction Project Design Contract for the Yanzishan Hakka Hotel" in Huizhou City.

Head of researches financed by Miur, Cnr and other public and private authorities, he coordinated, as person in charge by the Department of Architectural design, the urban plans for the municipalities of Cerignola and San Giovanni Rotondo in Apulia, and Cardano al Campo in Lombardy.

He worked with a number of reviews of architecture, among which "Casabella", "Hinterland", "Controspazio", Materia, "Edilizia Popolare", "d'Architettura", "Aión", "Il Disegno di Architettura", 'ANANKE, "Ottagono", "Costruire in Laterizio", "Recuperare". From 1982 until 1983 he edited the review "AL. Architetti Lombardi". From 2008 he is editor in chief of the review "Architettura Civile". He is also a member of the scientific board of the architecture series published by the houses Aión of Florence, Araba Fenice of Cuneo, Libraccio of Milan. He promoted the new architecture series of the house FrancoAngeli, which published the books on the work of Ernesto Nathan Rogers, Guido Canella, Carlo De Carli.

His theoretical and critical activity has been presented in various national and international conventions and seminars, and gave forth an intensive production of writings and essays.

== Theoretical activity (selected writings) ==
In his work, he addressed the contemporary issues on the architectural design and its teaching, starting from the volume Per costruire l'ambiente. Aspettative nel sociale e appropriazioni progettuali (1981), to the most recent essays Dialogo sul disegno e l'invenzione in architettura (2010); The Theme of Composition (2010); Oltre lo specchio, la forma (2011); Thesis Projects (2011); Quello che è / quello che non è il progetto urbano (2012); Farewell to Typology? Going Forward, dialogue with Francesco Collotti (2013); Composition as a Necessity, (2015); Architecture Schools: What Is Beneficial and Necessary (2016).

About the work, the theories and the poetic of modern architects he published the monography Aldo Andreani 1887–1971. Opere e progetti (1989); Opposizioni nella modernità. A proposito del "vecchio Behrens" (2011); La composizione come necessità, about Alessandro Christofellis (2012); Un lungo percorso di operatività del progetto, about Ignazio Gardella (2012); Nuovi inizi e analogie, about Giuseppe Terragni (2012); L'organismo architettonico: tipo e struttura interna, about Saverio Muratori (2013); L'architettura a Milano e la "continuità" di Rogers (2013); Guido Canella e la Scuola di Architettura Civile (2014); Authenticity and Balance about Luigi Caccia Dominioni (2014); Aldo Andreani à rebours (2015); O. M. Ungers architetto tedesco (2015); Anamnesis in Composition about Gianugo Polesello (2016); Attualità del "progetto storico" di Fischer von Erlach (2016); Forma e "liturgia" dell'abitare nell'opera di De Carli (2016); La forma costruita nel modo di Danilo Guerri (2017); Seriamente logica e altamente artistica about Camillo Boito (2017); All'inizio era la favola. Aldo Rossi e l'analogia come principio (2017).

He published, about the historiography of architecture, The "Step We Need to Take" in History (2012) and Space, Time and Architecture. The Growth of a New Tradition, of Sigfried Giedion (2012).

He addressed the issue of restoration and the relation between the ancient and the new, and the problems of the architectural approach within the archaeological areas. Specifically, he was responsible of the national research projects: L’antico nella città e nelle tradizioni del moderno (1995); Aree archeologiche e progetto di architettura (1998); I luoghi irrisolti della città: gli spazi dell’archeologica e le trasformazioni urbane (1998). On these subjects he wrote: "Non per altro si restaura che per apprendervi": l’antico nella città e nelle tradizioni del moderno (1990); Memoria e immanenza dell’antico nel progetto urbano (2002); Conservazione e progetto (2004); Profondità archeologica, immaginazione progettuale (2008); Aree archeologiche e progetto per la città (2010); La ricerca progettuale come interrogazione del tempo (2010); L’antico come principio di nuova architettura (2013).

He conducted studies and design experiences on monumental sites, that were published in: Il Castello a mare di Palermo (1993); Il medio corso del Po tra Piacenza e Cremona. Identità dei luoghi, scena urbana, paesaggio naturale (2003), Per una architettura di interpretazione (2005); Archeologia, città, museo. Atene come inizio (2007); Il Museo e la Passeggiata archeologica di Milano (2009); Città di frontiera. Alessandria tra Oriente e Occidente (2009); La lezione di Villa Adriana (2012); Immagini per i Fori Imperiali, idee per Roma (2017).

Upon the role of architecture in urban transformations he headed national researches as: “La città d’autore. Milano e alcune città padane” (1987); “Aggiornamento tipologico e costruttivo dell’edilizia residenziale in Lombardia” (2004–2007); he published essays: Istruzione come costruzione. Civiltà, contesti, trasmissione del sapere (1981); Ecologia, tipo, compito rappresentativo della biblioteca (1984); Storia, architettura e rimodellamento urbano di San Pellegrino nella città Brembana (1984); Milano: il luogo di Loreto (1985); Ferrovie e stazioni: struttura della città, “catastrofi” urbane (1987); Milano: Castello, Quartiere delle milizie, Città militare nella trasformazione del centro e nella costruzione della periferia (1989); Gli anni delle trasformazioni. Nuovi paesaggi urbani (1994); Agrotown as a paradigm (2005); Darsena as Grande Piazza in South Milan (2009); Scali ferroviari. Responsabilità e ruolo del progetto urbano (2012); L’integrazione tra Campo di Brera e Campus delle Arti. Una nuova articolazione della Pinacoteca e dell’Accademia nella città (2014); Anticipazioni dalla scena urbana (2015); La chiesa nel paesaggio della città metropolitana. Nuove occasioni di centralità e significazione formale (2017).

He also addressed the topic of the relation between figuration and construction in architecture, particularly in the essays: Forme dall’apparenza nuda (2004); Architettura e costruzione. Ricerche progettuali nel campo della sostenibilità (2010); Tensioni da comporre (nell’enfasi della costruzione sostenibile) (2011); Back to Construction (2012).

Recently he published the books Architettura in Capitanata. Opere e progetti / Works and projects 1997–2012 (2014) and Palermo interpretata (2016).

== Main works and architectural designs ==
Along with Torricelli Associati, his firm in Milan, he is author of competitions' designs as well as public and private professional assignment.

Among the urban-scale design, the one for the area Garibaldi-Repubblica in Milan (1991); the reconversion of Baggio's barracks and military installations (1993); Ispra's Eco Center (1994); the hotel, residential and cultural equipment pole for Fiera di Milano in the Pantanedo village of Rho (1995); the requalification of piazza Bagolino and of piazza della Repubblica in Alcamo (1996); the design for a new center for Christian ecumenism in Bari Punta Perotti (2006); the transformation design of Farini railway line in Milano (2009); the design for a new articulation for the Pinacoteca and for the Academy of Brera in Milan (2014); the design for Borgo Nuovo's diffused hotel il progetto in Monteleone di Puglia (2015); the retraining and refuncionalization designs for the Expo area and the Gasometer field in Bovisa, Milano (2016); the requalification design for Piazza Castello and Foro Buonaparte in Milan (2017).

Among the built work, the schools in Lumezzane (1973–79), in Cesano Boscone (1978–79), in Cerignola (1997–2001) and in Monteleone di Puglia (2006–09); the Lodi Park in Settimo Milanese (1983–87); the burial chapel at the Monumental Cemetery of Milan (1988–92); the subsidized housing in Legnano (1992–95) and in Cerignola (1997–2000); the Campari factories in Bussolengo (1985–87), in Cinisello Balsamo, (1986–87) and in Osimo (1988–91); the council hall and public square of Villa Marazzi in Cesano Boscone (1996–99); the new residential buildings and services (1998–2006) and the Social center (2004–05) in Cerignola; the villa in Vanzago (1999–2002) and the villa on the Riviera di Ponente (2006–11).

In 2004 he obtained the jury's special mention for the international design competition “Darsena” in Milan; in 2005 he won the competition for the a parochial complex in Milan and in 2009 the ideas contest for the “Restoration and historic-urban-environmental development of Piazza del Duomo in Cerignola”; his design has been mentioned in the international social Housing design competition "Il borgo sostenibile – Milano Figino" (2009); his proposition has been selected for the international ideas contest for the residential development of the ex-Barracks “Serafino Gnutti” in Brescia (2013); the design for "Borgo Nuovo's diffused hotel" international design competition in Monteleone di Puglia won the first prize (2015); the design for the international design competition Piazza Castello – Foro Buonaparte in Milano won the third place (2017).

== Awards and acknowledgements ==
His professional activity was rewarded with prizes and acknowledgements, among which the 9th Compasso d'Oro ADI (1979); the IN/Arch session within the "Rassegna critica delle opere di architettura in Lombardia" (1983); the "Marble Architectural Awards Italy" special mention (1988); the selection for the international architecture exhibition of Venice's Biennale (2006); the Special Prize "Architettura in Capitanata" (2010). His work has been exposed in occasion of many exhibitions and conferences, in Italy and abroad: at the Museo Nazionale della Scienza e della Tecnica, Milan (1995 e 1999); at the TU Delft Faculty of Architecture (1996, 2005 and 2009); at Milan's Triennale (1973, 1979, 1995 e 2003); at the Faculdade de Arquitectura da Universidade do Porto (2003); at the Festival dell'Architettura di Parma (2004 e 2010); at Venice's Biennale (2006); at the Universidad de Granada (2009); at the Università Iuav di Venezia (2009); at Milan's Urban Center (2010 e 2013); in Cittadella (Pd) and Bari (2011); in Tokyo (2011); at Athens' Italian Institute of Culture (2012).

His built work and his designs are published on specialized books and reviews either Italian and foreign. His work was subject of articles written by, among the others, Gianni Accasto, Marcella Aprile, Marco Biraghi, Federico Bucci, Enrico Bordogna, Guido Canella, Francesco Cellini, Francesco Collotti, Ernesto D'Alfonso, Emilio Faroldi, Giovanni Klaus Koenig, Francesco Menegatti, Luca Molinari, Raffaella Neri, Mario Pisani, Cesare Piva, Manfredo Tafuri, Virgilio Vercelloni.

== Bibliography ==
A part of his work has been published into the recent monograph Angelo Torricelli. Architettura in Capitanata. Opere e progetti / Works and projects 1997–2012, edited by C. Baglione (Padova 2014).

His work was published upon the main national and international reviews, guides and history of architecture's books, among which:

- M. Tafuri, Storia dell'architettura italiana 1944–1985, Giulio Einaudi Editore, Torino 1986;
- M. Casciato e G. Muratore (edited by), Annali dell'architettura italiana contemporanea 1985, Officina, Roma 1986;
- G. Carnevale e M. Montuori (edited by), Annali dell'architettura italiana contemporanea 1986–87, Officina, Roma 1991;
- Aa. Vv., Almanacco dell'architettura italiana, Electa, Milano 1993;
- M. Biraghi e S. Micheli, Storia dell'architettura italiana 1985–2015, Einaudi, Torino 2013;
- M. Biraghi, S. Micheli, G. Lo Ricco, Guida all'architettura di Milano 1954–2014, Hoepli, Milano 2013;
- i volumi di Identità dell'Architettura Italiana, Diabasis, Reggio Emilia dal 2003 al 2013;
- C. Baglione (edited by), Angelo Torricelli. Architettura in Capitanata, Il Poligrafo, Padova 2014.

== See also ==
- Politecnico di Milano
- Guido Canella
- Antonio Monestiroli
- Francesco Cellini
