= Premio Presidente della Repubblica (prize) =

Italian prize

The Premio Presidente della Repubblica is an Italian award introduced by the former president and academic Luigi Einaudi. Since 1949 it has been awarded on a regular basis by the Accademia dei Lincei, the Accademia di San Luca, and the Accademia Nazionale di Santa Cecilia. It is among the most distinguished awards of the three prestigious academies.

== History ==
The award was established on 11 October 1948 by Luigi Einaudi with a letter to the president of the Lincei National Academy to continue the tradition of royal awards. The prize was first introduced to the class of physical, mathematical, and natural sciences and the class of moral, historical, and philological sciences.

In the same year, Einaudi established a national prize for artists and architects awarded by the academies of San Luca and Santa Cecilia. The prize is given by the President of Italy in charge in an official ceremony. Among the people awarded, there are several winners of other important awards such as the Nobel Prize, the Wolf Prize, and the Academy Award.

== Prize recipients ==
Accademia dei Lincei
Year	Name	Class
1949	Oliviero Mario Olivo	General
1949	Giuseppe Occhialini	Physics
1950	Carlo Ferrari	General
1950	Adolfo Quilico	Chemistry
1951	Francesco Cedrangolo	General
1951	Ciro Andreatta	GPM
1952	Bruno Ferretti	General
1952	Alberto Stefanelli	Botany and Zoology
1953	Renato Caccioppoli	General
1953	Rodolfo Margaria	Physiology and Pathology
1954	Rodolfo Amprino	General
1954	Fabio Conforto	Mathematics and Mechanics
1955	Umberto D'Ancona	General
1955	Attilio Colacevich	AGG
1956	Piero Caldirola	Physics
1957	Vincenzo Caglioti	Chemistry
1958	Piero Leonardi	GPM
1959	Giuseppe Montalenti	Botany and Zoology
1960	Giulio Stella	Physiology and Pathology
1961	Carlo Miranda	FMN
1963	Giovanni Semerano	FMN
1965	Dario Graffi	FMN
1967	Nicolo' Dallaporta	FMN
1969	Massimo Simonetta	FMN
1971	Claudio Barigozzi	FMN
1973	Ennio De Giorgi	FMN
1975	Raoul Gatto	FMN
1977	Luigi Sacconi	FMN
1979	Nicola Cabibbo	FMN
1981	Bruno Turi	FMN
1983	Carlo Rubbia	FMN
1985	Maurizio Brunori	FMN
1987	Claudio Baiocchi	FMN
1989	Francesco Bertola	FMN
1991	Gian Gualberto Volpi	FMN
1993	Ernesto Capanna	FMN
1995	Francesco Paolo Sassi	FMN
1997	Giovanni Gallavotti	FMN
1999	Emilio Picasso	FMN
2001	Daniela Pietrobon	FMN
2003	Carlo M. Croce	FMN
2005	Vincenzo Schettino	FMN
2007	Giuseppe Macino	FMN
2009	Patrizia Caraveo	FMN
2010	Enrico Gusberti	MSF
2011	Sergio Doplicher	FMN
2012	Giorgio Otranto	MSF
2013	Giuseppe Bertin	FMN
2014	Carlo Gasparri	MSF
2015	Luca Bindi	SFMN
2016	Lilia Costabile	SMSF
2017	Brunangelo Falini	SFMN
2019	Francesco Calogero	SFMN
2020	Franco Gaetano Scoca	SMSF
2021	Silvio Garattini	SFMN
2022	Paolo Siniscalco	SMSF
2023	Luisa Torsi	SFMN
AGG: Astronomy, Geodesy, and Geophysics; FMN: Physical sciences GPM: Geology, Paleontology, and Mineralogy; MSF: Moral Sciences; SFMN: Physical, Mathematical, and Natural Sciences; SMSF: Moral, Historical, and Philological Sciences

Accademia di San Luca
Year	Name	Class
1950	Eugenio Viti	Painter
1951	Pericle Fazzini	Sculptor
1952	Saverio Muratori	Architect
1954	Mario Sironi	Painter
1955	Giuseppe Fortunato Pirrone	Sculptor
1956	Luigi Moretti	Architect
1958	Ugo Bernasconi	Painter
1960	Oscar Gallo	Sculptor
1963	Mario Ridolfi	Architect
1964	Gino Severini	Painter
1965	Marino Mazzacurati	Sculptor
1966	Pietro Lingeri	Architect
1967	Franco Gentilini	Painter
1969	Alberto Viani	Sculptor
1970	Carlo Scarpa	Architect
1971	Afro Basaldella	Painter
1973	Corrado Cagli	Painter
1974	Augusto Perez	Sculptor
1975	Carlo Aymonino	Architect
1976	Renzo Vespignani	Painter
1977	Floriano Bodini	Sculptor
1978	Nicola Pagliara	Architect
1979	Leonardo Cremonini	Painter
1980	Luigi Broggini	Sculptor
1981	Roberto Gabetti	Architect
1982	Giuseppe Guerreschi	Painter
1983	Giuliano Vangi	Sculptor
1984	Marco Zanuso	Architect
1985	Piero Dorazio	Painter
1986	Vincenzo Gaetaniello	Sculptor
1987	Gianni Accasto	Architect
1988	Franco Mulas	Painter
1989	Andrea Cascella	Sculptor
1990	Vittoriano Viganò	Architect
1991	Gianfranco Ferroni	Painter
1992	Alik Cavaliere	Sculptor
1993	Giorgio Raineri	Architect
1994	Carlo Cattaneo	Painter
1995	Giuseppe Uncini	Sculptor
1996	Francesco Cellini	Architect
1997	Achille Perilli	Painter
1998	Nunzio Di Stefano	Sculptor
1999	Alessandro Anselmi	Architect
2000	Titina Maselli	Painter
2001	Agostino Bonalumi	Sculptor
2002	Gianugo Polesello	Architect
2003	Antonio Corpora	Painter
2004	Carlo Lorenzetti	Sculptor
2005	Carlo Melograni	Architect
2006	Antonio Recalcati	Painter
2007	Grazia Varisco	Sculptor
2008	Salvatore Bisogni	Architect
2009	Carol Rama	Painter
2010	Pasquale Santoro	Sculptor
2011	Aurelio Cortesi	Architect
2012	Valentino Vago	Painter
2013	Maurizio Mochetti	Sculptor
2014	Claudio D'Amato Guerrieri	Architect
2015	Luigi Ontani	Painter
2016	Giovanni Anselmo	Sculptor
2017	Renato Rizzi	Architect

Accademia di Santa Cecilia
Year	Name	Class
2006	Maurizio Pollini	Music
2007	Renato Zanettovich	Music
2007	Dario De Rosa	Music
2008	Magda Olivero	Music
2009	Irma Ravinale	Music
2010	Roman Vlad	Music
2011	Riccardo Cerocchi	Music
2012	Alessandro Taverna	Music
2013	Imola Internat. Academy	Music
2014	Sylvano Bussotti	Music
2015	Riccardo Muti	Music
2016	Ennio Morricone	Music
2017	Antonio Pappano	Music

== See also ==
- Accademia dei Lincei
- Accademia di San Luca
- Accademia Nazionale di Santa Cecilia
- President of Italy
