= Aimaro Isola =

Italian architect

- Born: Aimaro Oreglia d'Isola; 14 January 1928 (age 98); Turin, Kingdom of Italy
- Education: Polytechnic University of Turin
- Occupations: Architect, designer, urban planner

Aimaro Oreglia d'Isola (born 14 January 1928), known commonly as Aimaro Isola, is an Italian architect, designer and urban planner.

== Life and career ==
Aimaro Isola is the youngest son of Baron Vittorio Oreglia d'Isola and Countess Caterina Malingri di Bagnolo, and the brother of nun Leletta D'Isola. At the age of 16, he joined the Italian Resistance, becoming a member of the 105th Garibaldi Brigade. He graduated in architecture from the Polytechnic University of Turin in 1952, where he later also taught.

In 1950, he established a professional firm with Roberto Gabetti, marking the beginning of a long and prolific partnership. By the late 1950s, Gabetti and Isola had become key figures in the Neo-liberty movement. Their most notable works include: Casa Paravia (Piazza Statuto, Turin), the Palazzo della Borsa Valori (Turin), the Alba Courthouse, as well as residential complexes, urban plans, religious buildings, and architectural restorations.

Following Gabetti's death in 2000, he continued his architectural work by founding the Isolarchitetti studio with his son, Saverio.

Isola has been a member of the Accademia di San Luca in Rome, and a member of the Academy of Sciences in Turin. Isola's design works are included in the permanent collections of the Museum of Modern Art (MoMA) in New York, the Centre Pompidou in Paris, and the MAXXI in Rome.

== Works (selection) ==
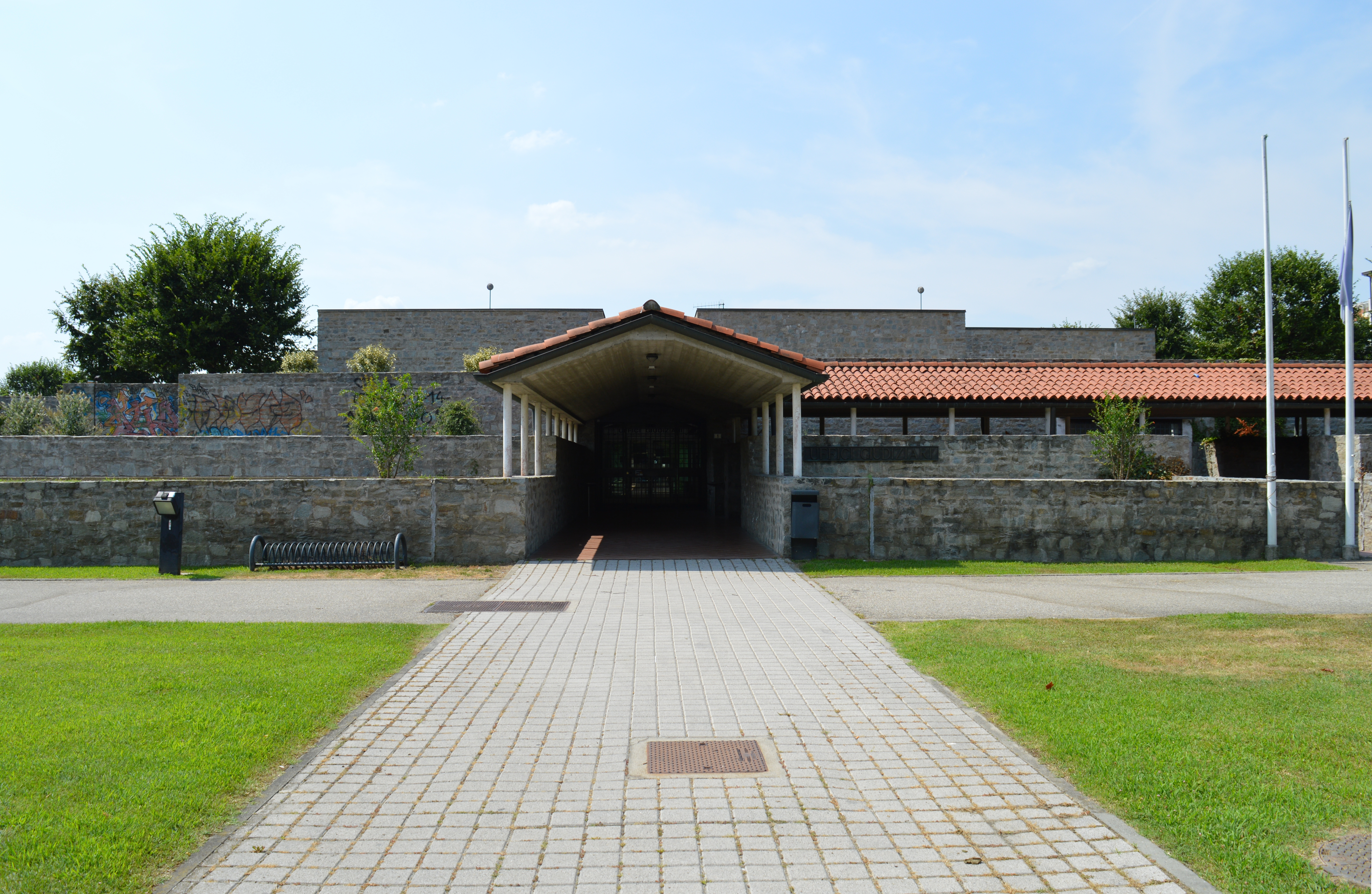
Alba Courthouse

- Palazzo della Borsa Valori di Torino (1953–1956)
- Monument to the Fallen of the Resistance, Pinerolo (1965)
- Western Residential Unit for Olivetti, Ivrea (1968)
- Alba Courthouse (1981–1987)
- Marina of Varazze (1984–2006)
- Parish of Santa Maria in Zivido, San Giuliano Milanese (1998–2008)
- Block Santo Stefano, Turin (2000–2006)
- IBM Corporate Centre, Segrate (2001–2004)
- Renovation and refunctionalization of the Egyptian Museum, Turin (from 2008)
- New Bergamo Courthouse (2003–2007)
- Restyling of the Eram Shopping Mall, Tehran (2011)
- New museum use for the Cavour Castle, Santena (2012)

== Books (selection) ==
- Isola, Aimaro (2004). Violenza nell'architettura. Florence: Aión Edizioni.
- Isola, Aimaro (2012). Anche le pietre dimenticano. Florence: Aión Edizioni.
- Isola, Aimaro (2013). Disegnare luoghi, scrivere architetture. Turin: Academia University Press.

== Awards ==
- Antonio Feltrinelli Prize from the Accademia Nazionale dei Lincei (1988)
- International Prize "Architectures in Stone" (1991)
- Ance-IN/ARCH National Prize for Career Achievement (2006)
- Milan Triennial-MAXXI Career Prize (2023)

== Sources ==
- Cellini, F.; D'Amato, C. (1985). Gabetti e Isola. Milan: Electa.
- P. Zermani, ed. (1989). Gabetti e Isola. Bologna: Zanichelli.
- G. Ciucci, ed. (1989). L'architettura Italiana oggi. Racconto di una generazione. Rome: Laterza. pp. 93–121.
- Guerra, A.; Morresi, M. (1996). Gabetti e Isola: Opere di architettura. Milan: Electa.
- Pace, S.; Reinerio, L. (2005). Architetture per la liturgia. Opere di Gabetti e Isola. Milan: Skira.
- C. Piva, ed. (2008). Paesaggi piemontesi. Gabetti & Isola + Isolarchitetti + 9 architetture "minori". Florence: Aión Edizioni.
- Leoni, G. (2009). F. Bruna; T. Marzi (eds.). Isolarchitetti. Milan: Skira.
- E. Giacobino, ed. (2013). Isolarchitetti. I maestri dell'architettura. Milan: Hachette.
