= Premio Presidente della Repubblica =

Premio Presidente della Repubblica may refer to:

- Premio Presidente della Repubblica (horse race), an Italian Group 2 horse race
- Premio Presidente della Repubblica (prize), scientific and artistic prizes awarded by the prestigious Italian academies Lincei National Academy, Accademia di San Luca, and the Accademia Nazionale di Santa Cecilia
