= Lucia Banci =

Italian chemist

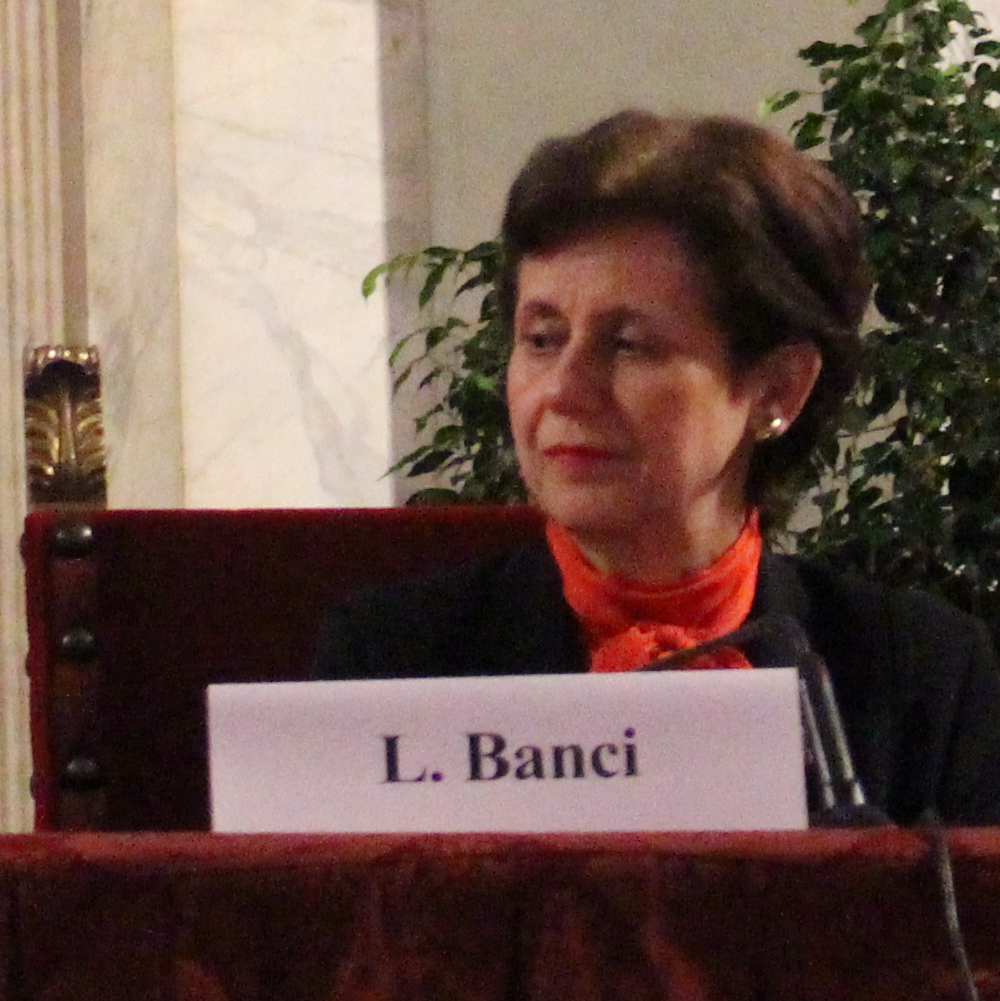
- Born: 20 May 1954 (age 72)
- Education: University of Florence
- Scientific career
- Workplaces: University of Florence
- Thesis: (1978)

Lucia Banci (born 20 May 1954) is an Italian chemist who is a professor at the University of Florence. Her research considers structural biology and biological nuclear magnetic resonance, with a focus on the role of metal ions in biological systems.

== Early life and education ==
Banci was an undergraduate student at the University of Florence. Her interest in magnetic resonance spectroscopy started with electron paramagnetic resonance, which can be used to study molecules that contain unpaired electrons. Banci remained at the University of Florence for postdoctoral research, and received tenure in 1983.

== Research and career ==
Banci has studied the role of metal ions in biological processes. She extensively developed nuclear magnetic resonance spectroscopy for biological systems, and made use of it to better design and optimise vaccines. She founded the Centro Risonanze Magnetiche (CERM), a magnetic resonance centre in Italy, where she studies globular proteins. Her research resulted in the development of the Meningococcal vaccine.

In 2020, Banci oversaw the installation of the world's first 1.2 GHz nuclear magnetic resonance system. The ultra-high field system can provide information on intrinsically disordered proteins. The instrument makes use of low-temperature superconductors – high-temperature superconductors hybrid magnet technologies. During the COVID-19 pandemic, Banci used nuclear magnetic resonance to determine the structure of SARS-CoV-2 and how it could be treated with medicine.

== Awards and honours ==
- 1994 Italian Chemical Society Raffaele Nasini Medal
- 2012 Elected member of European Molecular Biology Organization
- 2014 Appointed to European Molecular Biology Laboratory Council
- 2014 Elected to the Academia Europaea
- 2015 International Union of Pure and Applied Chemistry Distinguished Women in Chemistry Award
- 2017 Instruct Bertini Award for Integrated Structural Biology
- 2017 Bruker Ivano Bertini Award
- 2018 National Institute for Infectious Diseases Lazzaro Spallanzani Mother Science Award
- 2020 Honorary member of the National Magnetic Resonance Society of India
- 2022 Accademia dei Lincei Luigi Tartufari Prize

== Selected publications ==
- Andreini, Claudia; Banci, Lucia; Bertini, Ivano; Rosato, Antonio (2006). "Counting the zinc-proteins encoded in the human genome". Journal of Proteome Research. 5 (1): 196–201. doi:10.1021/pr050361j. PMID 16396512. Wikidata Q33231024.
- L Chen; H Hahn; G Wu; et al. (2001). "Opposing cardioprotective actions and parallel hypertrophic effects of delta PKC and epsilon PKC". Proceedings of the National Academy of Sciences of the United States of America. 98 (20): 11114–11119. Bibcode:2001PNAS...9811114C. doi:10.1073/pnas.191369098. PMC 58692. PMID 11553773. Wikidata Q33944297.
- Andreini, Claudia; Banci, Lucia; Bertini, Ivano; Rosato, Antonio (2006). "Zinc through the three domains of life". Journal of Proteome Research. 5 (11): 3173–3178. doi:10.1021/pr0603699. PMID 17081069. Wikidata Q55042662.
