= Mainella =

Mainella is a surname. Notable people with the surname include:

- Adrian Mainella, Canadian fashion journalist and television personality
- Fran P. Mainella (born 1947), Director of the National Park Service of the United States

== See also ==
- Marinella (disambiguation)
