= Luigi Sacconi =

FeCoP_{3} complex reported by Sacconi et al.

Luigi Sacconi was an Italian inorganic chemist who gained renown for contributions to coordination chemistry. He was born on February 28, 1911 in S. Croce sull'Arno. He died September 1, 1992. He received a Doctor of Pharmacy at the University of Florence. He was on the faculties at the University of Parma, Turin, and then Florence. He was mentor of future influential inorganic chemists including Ivano Bertini, Claudio Bianchini, Fausto Calderazzo, Carlo Floriani, Dante Gatteschi, Carlo Mealli, and Maurizio Peruzzini. Among his many contributions, Sacconi popularized tripodal ligands, which often stabilize pentacoordinate complexes with unusual electronic or chemical properties.

The Sacconi Medal was instituted to recognize Sacconi's contributions. He was awarded the Premio Presidente della Repubblica (prize) in 1977.
