= Marinella (disambiguation) =

Marinella (1938–2026) was the stage name of Greek singer Kyriaki Papadopoulou.

Marinella may also refer to:

- Three albums by Marinella:
  - Marinella (1969 album)
  - Marinella (1971 album)
  - Marinella (1981 album)
- Marinella (film), a 1936 French comedy film
- Marinella (TV series), a 1999–2001 Philippine drama series
- E. Marinella, an Italian necktie company

== People ==
- Lucrezia Marinella (1571–1653), Italian poet, author, and advocate of women's rights
- Marinella Bortoluzzi (1939–2024), Italian high jumper
- Marinella Canclini (born 1974), Italian short-track speed skater
- Marinella Draghetti (born 1961), Italian basketball player
- Marinella Falca (born 1986), Italian gymnast
- Marinella Mazzanti, Italian inorganic chemist
- Marinella Panayiotou (born 1995), Cypriot footballer
- Marinella Senatore (born 1977), Italian visual artist

== Places ==
- Marinella di Selinunte, a frazione in Castelvetrano in Trapani Province, Sicily, Italy
- Santa Marinella, a comune (municipality) in the Province of Rome in the Italian region Lazio
