= Neo-liberty =

Neo-liberty was an original but transient concept in architectural theory, which developed in Italy the 1950s. It was a concept held by a loosely connected group of Milanese architects, but particularly those associated with Casabella-Continuità, an architectural and design magazine, led by the editor-in-chief at Casabella, Ernesto Nathan Rogers.

Neo-liberty's origin lay in a re-assessment of the ideology of modernism. It suggested that there was continuity between historic architectural tradition and modernism rather than an immutable chasm. It further suggested that it was acceptable to include historical elements in current architecture and design.

Although transient in terms of the history of architecture, and localised to Italy, albeit with some proponents in the United States, there was a strong reaction against Neo-liberty. This was published openly in April 1959 by Reyner Banham, the British architectural critic.

Architects associated with Neo-liberty included Roberto Gabetti, Aimaro Isola, Aldo Rossi, Vittorio Gregotti, Gae Aulenti, Giotto Stoppino, Guido Canella and Giancarlo De Carlo.
