= Guido Canella =

Italian architect

- Born: 19 January 1931; Bucharest, Kingdom of Romania
- Died: 2 September 2009 (aged 78); Milan, Lombardy, Italy
- Education: Polytechnic University of Milan
- Occupation: Architect

Guido Canella (19 January 1931 – 2 September 2009) was an Italian architect, known for his typological studies of urban infrastructures and for anticipating the themes of postmodern architecture in Italy. He has often been associated with the architectural movement of Neo-liberty.

== Life and career ==
Born in Bucharest in 1931, Canella earned a degree in architecture from the Polytechnic University of Milan. He was an assistant to Giuseppe Samonà in Venice (1960–1963) and to Ernesto Nathan Rogers in Milan (1962–1965). Since 1970, he has been a full professor of Architectural Composition at the Polytechnic University, and in 1997 he moved to the Faculty of Architecture in Milan-Bovisa.

Author of significant theoretical contributions in the typological field, Canella directed the architecture and urban planning magazine Hinterland from 1978 to 1995, and the semiannual publication Zodiac from 1989 to 2001. He was a member of the executive board of the Milan Triennial XVI. He has been a national member of the Accademia di San Luca since 1990, serving as president in 2007–2008. He was also part of the Scientific Committee of the National Group for Architecture of the National Research Council.

In 1969, he won the National IN/Arch Award. In 1995, he was awarded the Award of the International Critics of Architecture at the VI Architecture Biennale in Buenos Aires.

== Works (selection) ==
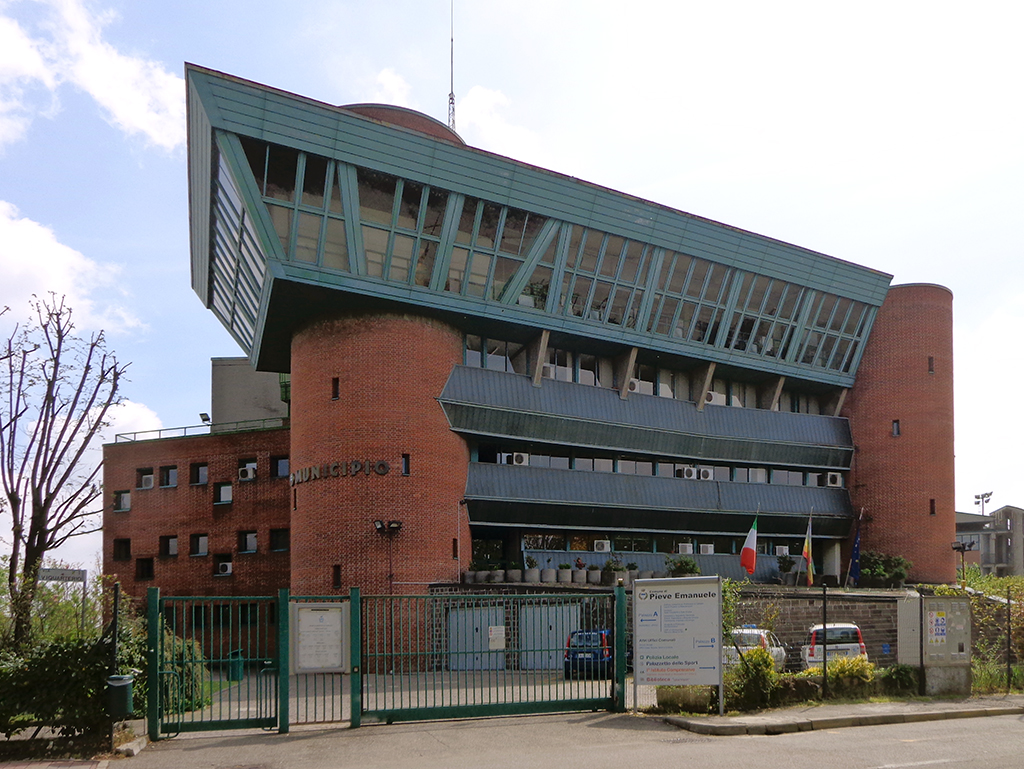
The Civic Center of Pieve Emanuele

- Civic Center of Segrate (1966–1968)
- Civic Center of Pieve Emanuele (1971–1978)
- Agricultural Technical Institute, Noverasco (1974)
- IACP neighborhood, Bollate (1974–1981)
- Ancona Courthouse (with Fernando Clemente and Alberto Sandroni, 1975–1986)
- Town Hall, Pioltello (1976)
- Legnano Courthouse (1980)
- IACP neighborhood, Peschiera Borromeo (1982–1992)
- Bodoni Technical Institute, Parma (1985)
- Office building on Via Fortezza, Milan (1991)
- Pescara Air Terminal (1992–1997)
- Intercontinental Hotel, Asmara (1996)
- Town Hall, Gorgonzola (2003)

== Sources ==
- Bordogna, Enrico (2001). Guido Canella. Opere e progetti. Milan: Electa.
- Vittorio Savi, ed. (1984). Guido Canella. Opere recenti. Modena: Panini.
- Katuyuki Suzuki, ed. (1983). Guido Canella. Bologna: Zanichelli.
