= Giuseppe Bertin =

Italian astrophysicist

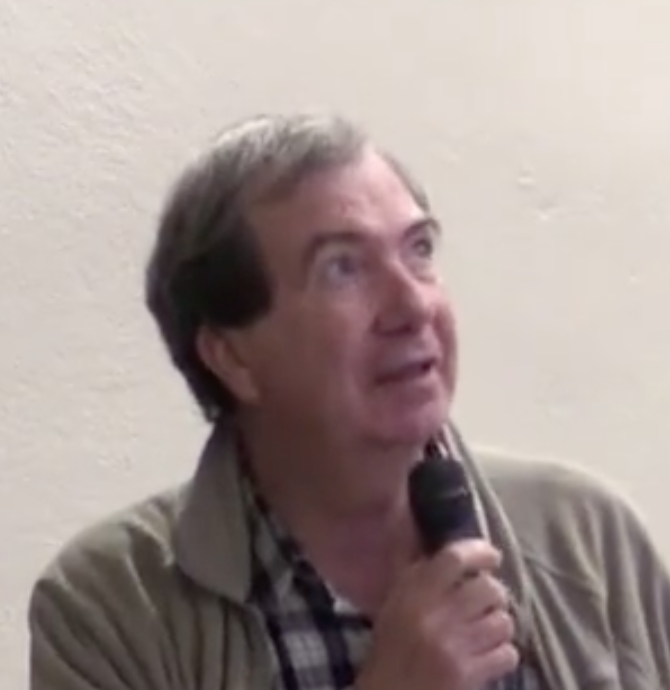
- Giuseppe Bertin
- Born: 28 March 1952 (age 74); Adria, Italy
- Education: Scuola Normale Superiore
- Awards: Premio Presidente della Repubblica
- Scientific career
- Fields: Physics
- Workplaces: Scuola Normale Superiore Massachusetts Institute of Technology Present: University of Milan INFN

Giuseppe Bertin (born in Adria, 28 March 1952) is an Italian physicist, known for his work in the explanation of the spiral structure of galaxies, and in the use of these as cosmological probes and gravitational lenses. Bertin is currently Professor at the University of Milan. He won the Premio Presidente della Repubblica in 2013 for his contribute in the latest discoveries in the dynamics of galaxies.

== Biography ==
Bertin obtained a Laurea in physics, and subsequently a PhD at the Scuola Normale Superiore in Pisa. Giuseppe Bertin is full professor of Theoretical Astrophysics at the University of Milan and collaborator at the National Institute of Nuclear Physics. He is currently considered one of the most influential Italian theoretical astrophysicists on the territory. From '75 to '91 he was first a researcher and then an associate professor at the Massachusetts Institute of Technology. He was also a collaborator at the Space Telescope Science Institute in Baltimore, and at the Kapteyn Astronomical Institute in Groningen. In the two-year period 2000–2002 he was a member, collaborator and consultant for ESO's observation programs. In the three-year period between 2006 and 2009 he became a member of the Kavli Institute for Theoretical Physics at the University of California, Santa Barbara. He is currently a member of the American Physical Society, the International Astronomical Union, the American Astronomical Society, and the New York Academy Sciences.

== Research ==
He was a student, researcher and professor at the University of Pisa and the Scuola Normale of Pisa. He currently holds the role of full professor at the Physics department of the University of Milan, where he teaches theoretical astrophysics. His research focuses on the study of globular clusters of galaxies and the disks of galaxies. His main scientific results focus more on the explanation of the spiral structure (normal and barred) of galaxies, and on the use of these as cosmological probes and gravitational lenses. He also deals with the study of collective phenomena in astrophysical plasmas and self-gravitating accretion disk.

== Awards ==
In 2013, he was appointed corresponding member of the Accademia Nazionale dei Lincei thanks to his notable contribution in understanding the dynamics in galaxies. In the same year he received the President of the Republic Award of the Accademia dei Lincei, from the then president Giorgio Napolitano at the Quirinale on 24 June. He is the third professor in the Physics department of the University of Milan to receive the award, after Beppo Occhialini (in '49) and Piero Caldirola (in '56). He also received the Lions club's Two Towers Gold Award in 1991.

== Selected publications ==
He is the author of two monographs published by MIT Press and Cambridge University Press, about 200 refereed articles, and more than 40 invited articles.

- Dynamics of Galaxies (Astronomia), Cambridge University Press; 2ª edizione (21 aprile 2014), ISBN 978-1107000544.
- Dynamics of Galaxies (Astronomia), Cambridge University Press; 1ª edizione (12 giugno 2000), ISBN 978-0521478557.
- Spiral Structure in Galaxies (Astronomia): A Density Wave Theory; Mit Pr; New edizione (1 maggio 1996), ISBN 978-0262023962
- Collective Phenomena in Macroscopic Systems – Proceedings of the Workshop (Astronomia); World Scientific Publishing Company (17 August 2007), ISBN 978-9812707055
- Plasmas in the Laboratory and in the Universe: New Insights and New Challenges (AIP Conference Proceedings); American Institute of Physics; 2004th edition (26 March 2004), ISBN 978-0735401761
