= Franco Mulas =

Italian painter (1938–2023)

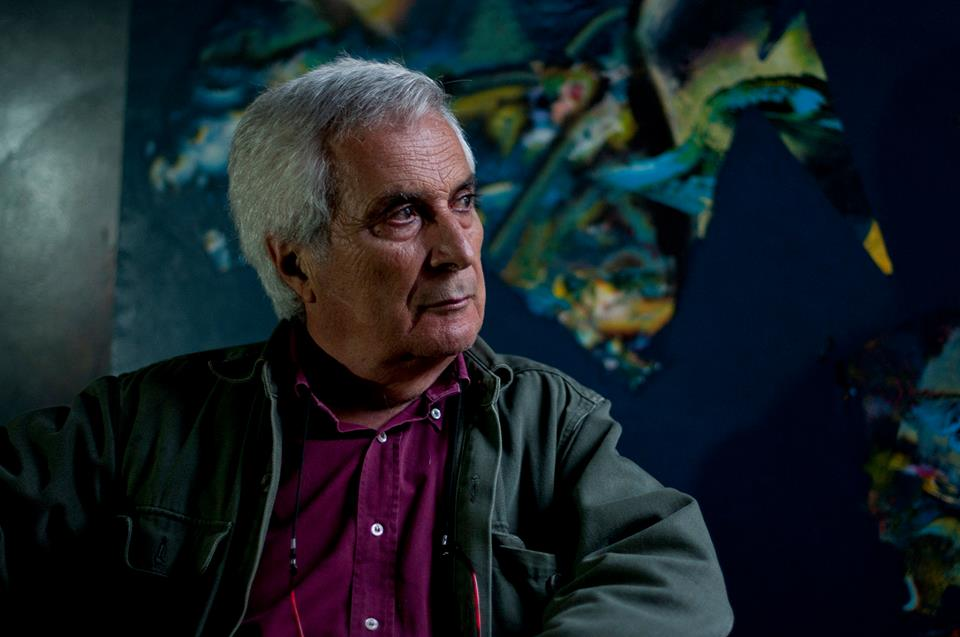
- Born: 30 August 1938; Rome, Kingdom of Italy
- Died: 3 March 2023 (aged 84); Rome, Italy
- Occupation: Painter

Franco Mulas (30 August 1938 – 3 March 2023) was an Italian painter.

== Life and career ==
Born in Rome, Mulas studied at the French Academy and at the School of Ornamental Art in his hometown. He held his first personal exposition in 1967. During his career he was influenced by various tendencies, from classicism to pop art. His art was characterized by his political and social commitments, and among his most important works were the cycles Week end, depicting the alienation of Italians spending their weekends in traffic jams, and Occidente ("West"), devoted to May 68 and protests of 1968, and the painting L’immaginazione non ha preso il potere ("Imagination did not take over").

During his career Mulas received various honors and awards, notably the Premio Presidente della Repubblica and the title of Accademico di San Luca. He died on 3 March 2023, at the age of 84.
