= Western Residential Unit =

- Unità Residenziale Ovest
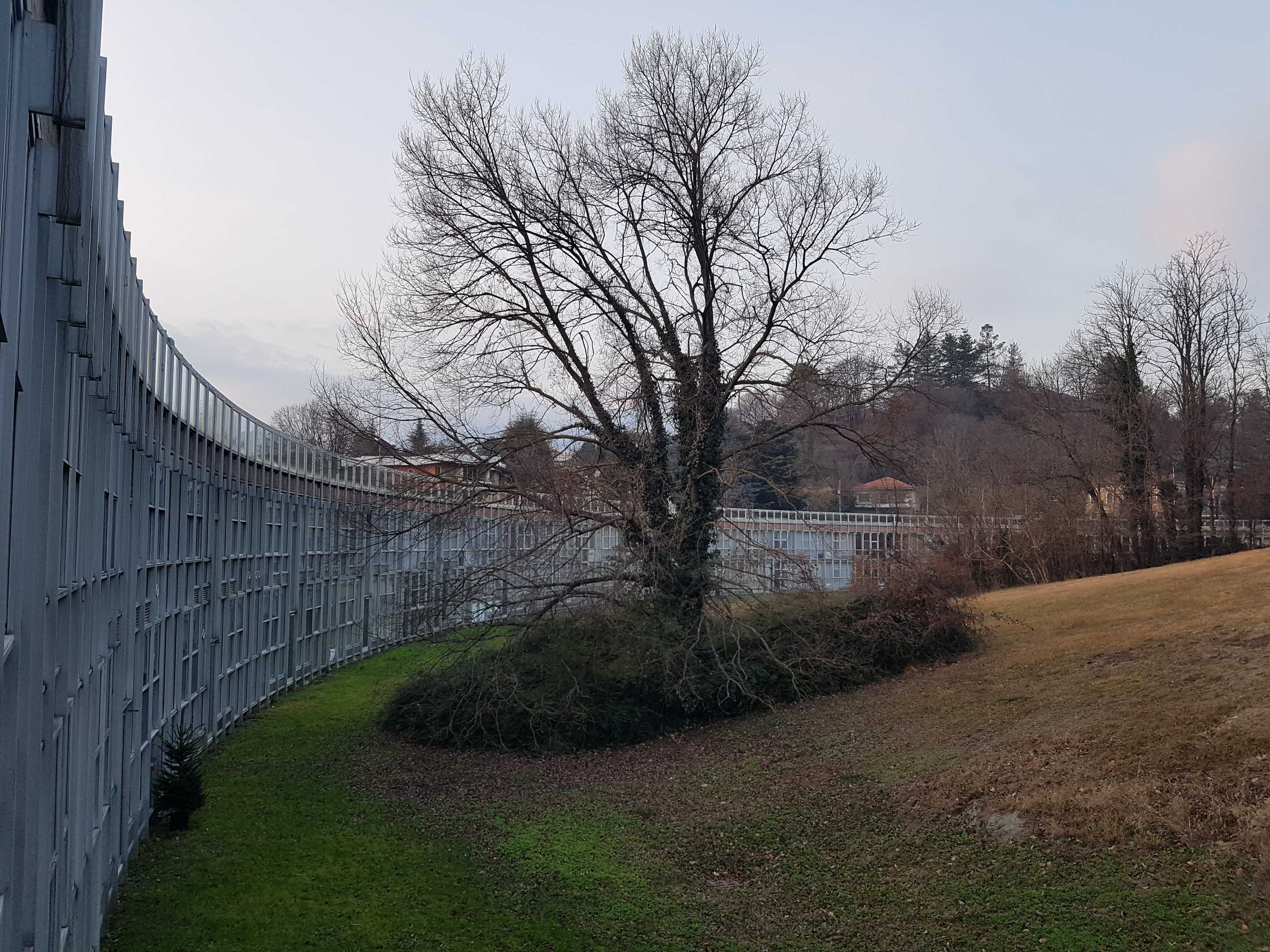
- Unità Residenziale Ovest in 2020
- Click on the map for a fullscreen view

General information
- Location: Ivrea, Italy
- Coordinates: 45°27′32.6″N 7°52′02.1″E
- Client: Olivetti

Design and construction
- Architect(s): Roberto Gabetti, Aimaro Isola

The Western Residential Unit (Italian: Unità Residenziale Ovest), colloquially known as Talponia, is a building located in Ivrea, Italy. It is part of the Olivetti complex in Ivrea, which has been designated as a UNESCO World Heritage site under the name Ivrea, Industrial City of the 20th Century.

== History ==
The building was commissioned by the Olivetti company and designed by architects Roberto Gabetti and Aimaro Isola in 1968. The client wanted a structure that could temporarily accommodate employees visiting the company’s headquarters in Ivrea.

== Description ==
The building sits on a man-made slope and has a unique semicircular design with a 70-meter radius. It is mostly underground, except for the façade facing a large inner courtyard. The paved roof, accessible from the road, acts as a terrace overlooking the courtyard, which features a planted hill. The glass curtain wall blends with the glass railing of the upper terrace.

The complex, spread over two floors, includes 13 duplex apartments of 120 square meters and 72 single-story apartments of 80 square meters, connected by a covered street.

== Gallery ==
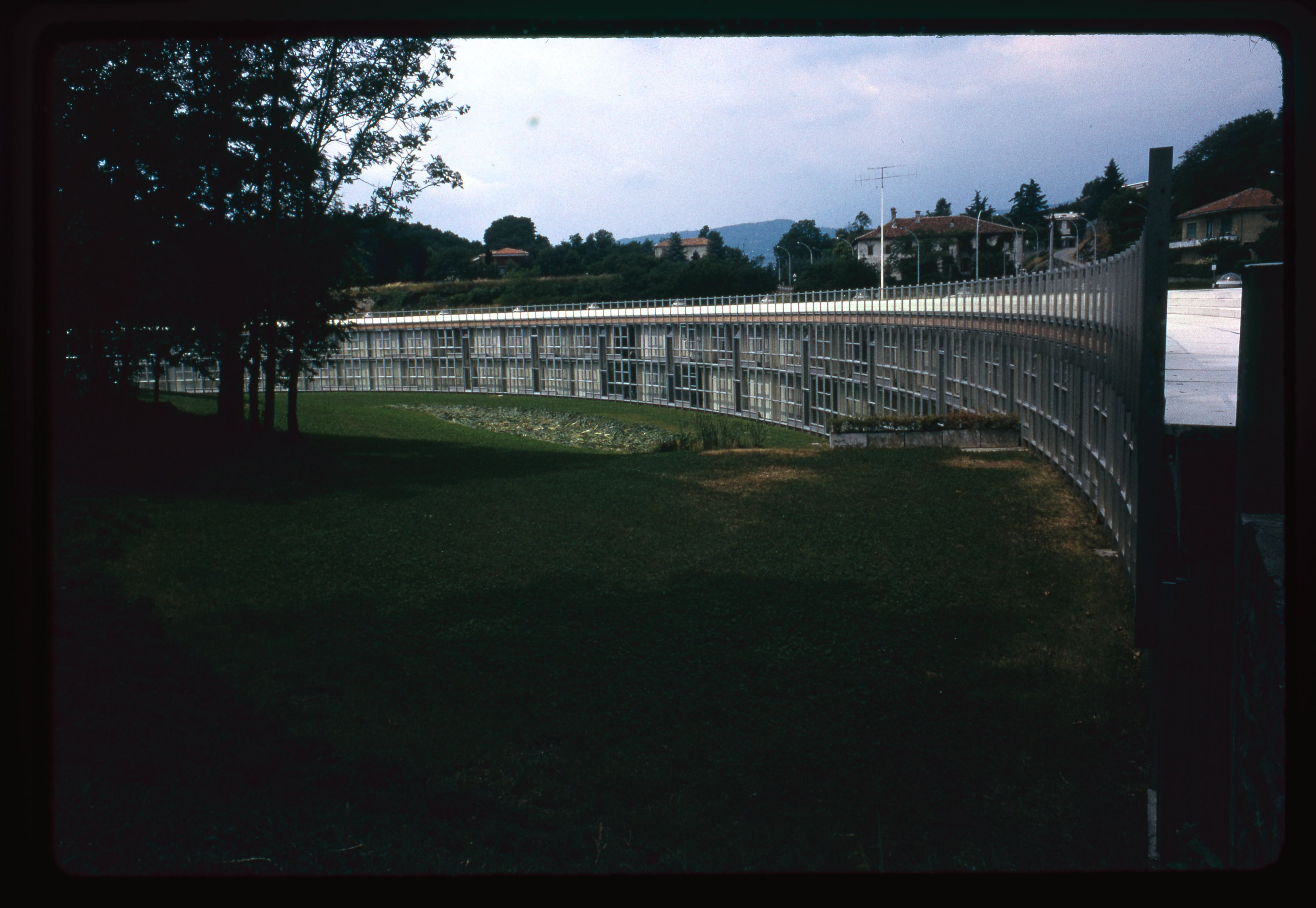

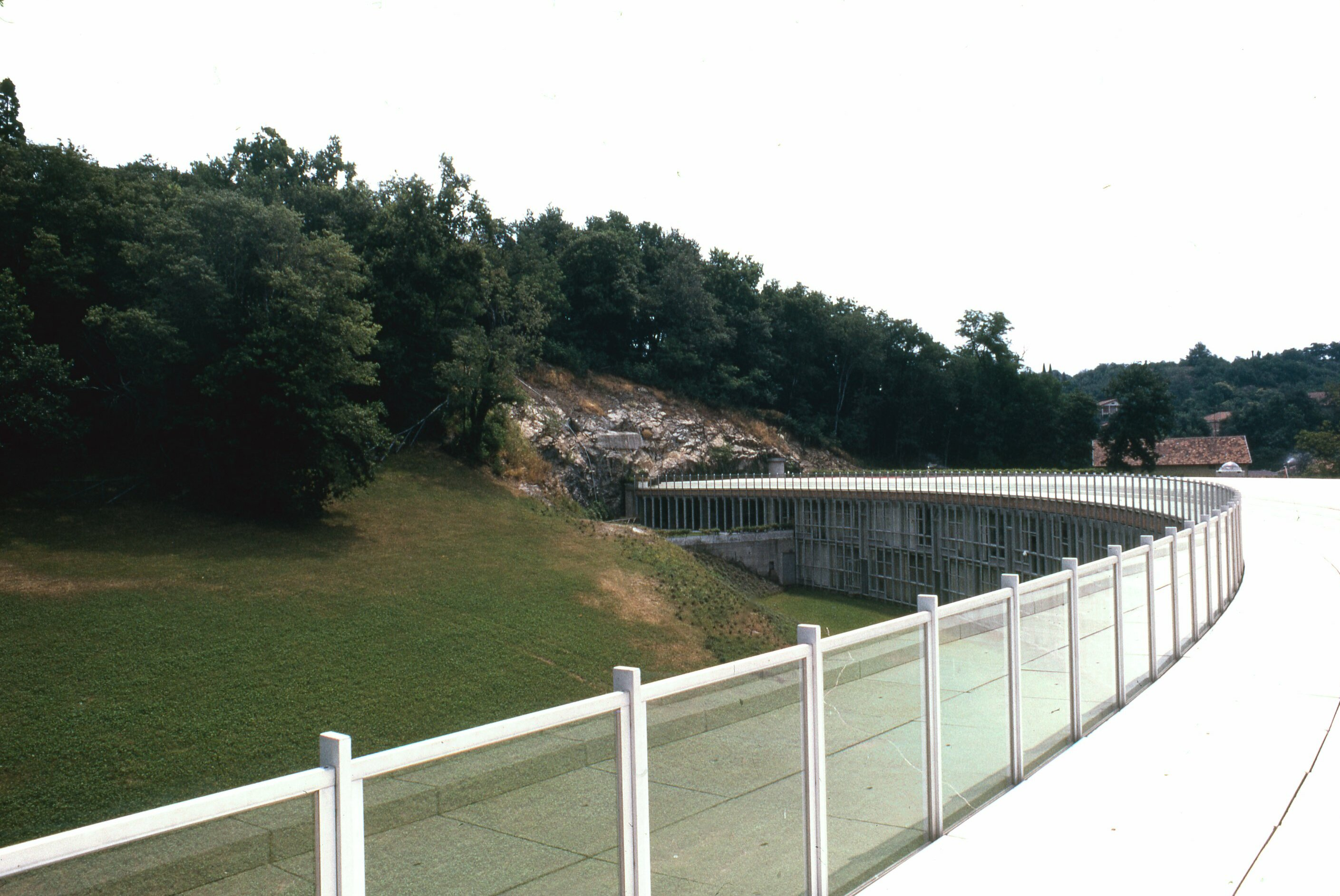

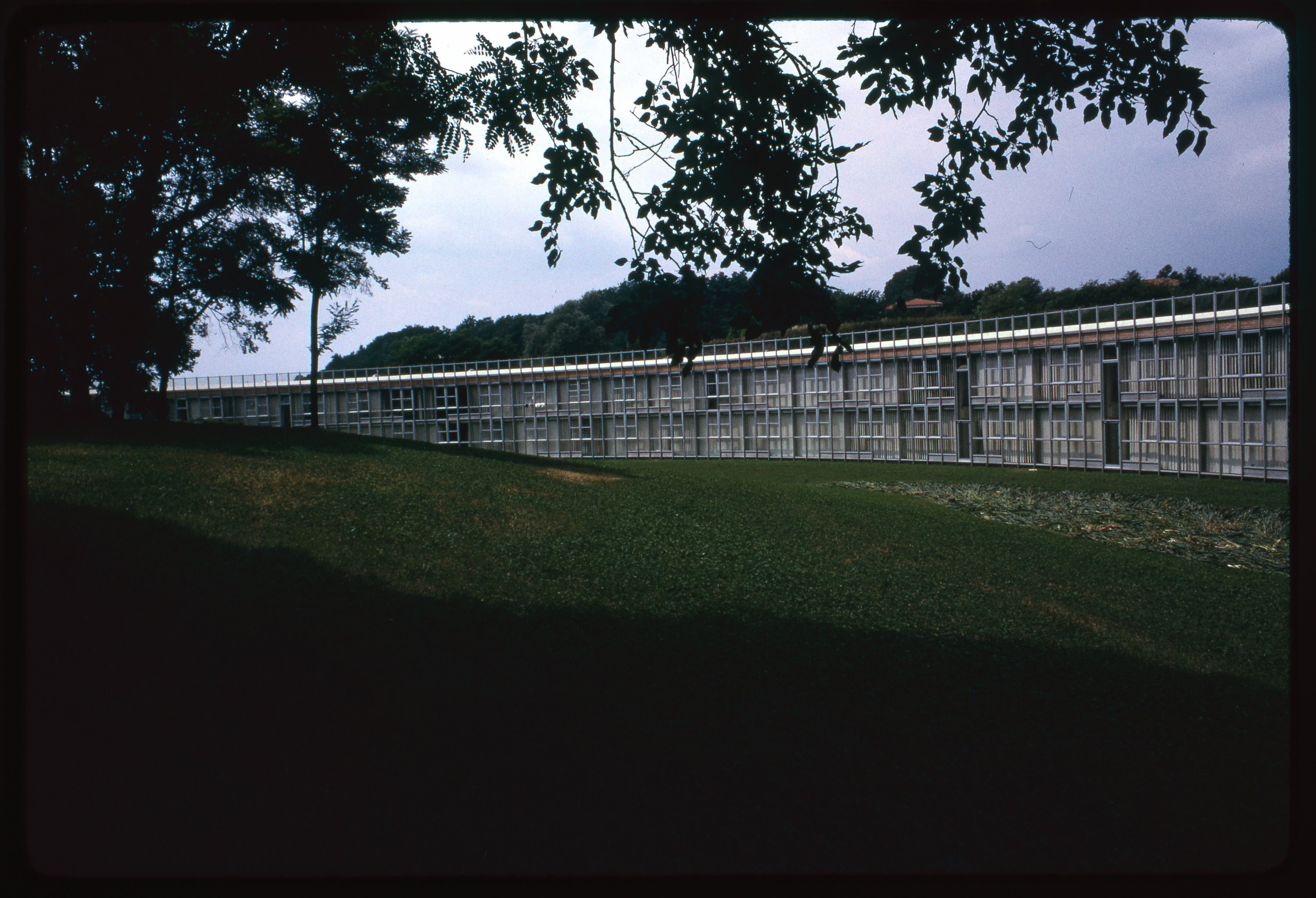
