= Fausto Calderazzo =

Italian chemist (1930–2014)

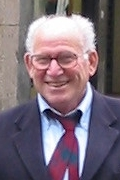
- Calderazzo in 2004
- Born: March 8, 1930; Parma, Italy
- Died: June 1, 2014 (aged 84); Pisa, Italy.
- Education: University of Florence (BS)
- Awards: A. Miolati award (1988); L. Sacconi Medal (1998)
- Scientific career
- Fields: Inorganic Chemistry; Organometallic Chemistry
- Institutions: University of Pisa; Polytechnic University of Milan

Fausto Calderazzo was an Italian inorganic chemist. He gained renown from numerous contributions in inorganic chemistry and organometallic chemistry. He was born in Parma, on March 8, 1930, where his father served in the Royal Italian army. He died in Pisa on June 1, 2014, at the age of 84.

== Life and education ==
Fausto Calderazzoe entered the University of Florence, in November 1947. He worked in the laboratory of Luigi Sacconi. After the compulsory military service, Calderazzo joined the research group of Giulio Natta, a future Nobel laureate in Milan. He was a postdoctoral fellow with F. A. Cotton. His first independent position was at the Cyanamid European Research Institute in Geneva (1963-1968). There he was part of a team of future eminent scholars, including Carlo Floriani. For most of his career he was professor at the University of Pisa.

== Research ==
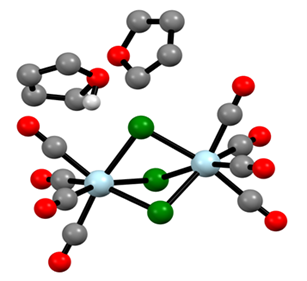
Figure 4. Crystallographic structure of [H(THF)_{2}][Nb_{2}(μ-Cl)_{3}(CO)_{8}]

=== Metal carbonyl chemistry ===
While in Milan, he discovered V(CO)_{6}. He made seminal contributions to the mechanism of migratory insertion reactions, with emphasis on the stereochemical course of the carbonylation of CH_{3}Mn(CO)_{5}. His team later (in Pisa) developed syntheses of Na[Nb(CO)_{6}] and Na[Ta(CO_{6})].

He contributed to the so-called "non classical" carbonyl compounds through studies on gold complexes.

=== Metal halides ===
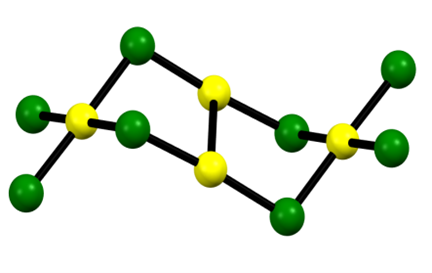
Structure of Au_{4}Cl_{8}

Calderazzo extended his interest in carbonyl chemistry of the late transition metals halides. His group reported Au_{4}Cl_{8}, a simple mixed-valence gold chloride.

=== Early metal complexes ===
Many of his contributions focused on early transition metals. He carried out research on carbon dioxide complexes.

Starting with the preparation of V(η^{6}-1,3,5-C_{6}H_{3}Me_{3})_{2}, his group prepared many bis-mesitylene derivatives.

== Awards and titles ==
Calderazzo was a member of the editorial or advisor board of international scientific journals. He was a member of the Société Royale de Chemie (1987), Società Chimica Italiana and Accademia Nazionale dei Lincei (1989). He received the A. Miolati award in Inorganic Chemistry in 1988 and the L. Sacconi Medal in 1998.
