= Ancona Courthouse =

Judiciary building in Ancona, Italy

- Interactive map of the Ancona Courthouse area

General information
- Type: Courthouse
- Location: Ancona, Marche, Italy
- Coordinates: 43°37′05.6″N 13°30′53.7″E
- Construction started: 1883
- Completed: 1884
- Renovated: 1982–1989

Design and construction
- Architects: Alessandro Benedetti (1878–84); Guido Canella, Fernando Clemente, Alberto Sandroni (1975–89)
- Structural engineer: Andrea Castiglioni, Giuseppe Grandori (1975–89)

The Ancona Courthouse (Italian: Palazzo di Giustizia di Ancona, lit. 'Palace of Justice of Ancona') is a judicial complex located on Corso Giuseppe Mazzini in Ancona, Italy.

== History ==
The early Ancona courthouse was built in Renaissance Revival style between 1878 and 1884, based on a design by engineer Alessandro Benedetti. It was intended to house the offices of the magistrate, the court, and the provincial archive. The interior halls were decorated with frescoes by the artist Luigi Samoggia.

The structure followed the typical Renaissance palace layout with a central courtyard. Its facades features three tiers of windows, with the central ones adorned by a pediment, string courses, and a stone cornice. The main façade is accessed through a monumental doorway flanked by Corinthian columns.

Heavily damaged by an earthquake in 1972, the building was completely renovated in the 1980s. Originally slated for demolition to be replaced with a more suitable structure for the new needs, it was saved thanks to the proposals of architects Guido Canella, Fernando Clemente, and Alberto Sandroni. They suggested preserving the external shell as a testament to the city's 19th-century expansion.

The intervention only preserved the external perimeter walls and the monumental entrance on Corso Mazzini. Inside, all load-bearing horizontal and vertical structures were demolished and rebuilt to create five above-ground floors. The previous courtyard was enclosed with a skylight.

== Sources ==
- Bordogna, Enrico (2001). Guido Canella. Opere e progetti. Milan: Electa. pp. 66–71.
- Ciccarelli, Lorenzo (2016). Guida all'architettura nelle Marche 1900-2015. Macerata: Quodlibet. pp. 144–145.
