= Bergamo Courthouse =

Judiciary building in Bergamo, Italy

- Interactive map of the Bergamo Courthouse area

General information
- Location: Bergamo, Lombardy, Italy
- Coordinates: 45°41′42.3″N 9°39′56.4″E
- Construction started: 14th century
- Inaugurated: 2008; 18 years ago
- Renovated: 2003–2007

Design and construction
- Architects: Luca Moretto, Aimaro Isola

The Bergamo Courthouse is a judicial complex located on Via Borfuro in Bergamo, Italy.

== History ==
The Court of Bergamo is housed in the former school complex originally established in 1838 as the "Orphanage for Boys of the Contrada Sant'Alessandro". The site has been extensively renovated and expanded under the direction of architects Luca Moretto and Aimaro Isola. The project included the restoration of several historic elements, most notably the 14th-century former church of Santa Maddalena, along with its adjoining cloister and small bell tower.

Construction of the new wing began in 2003 and continued over a five-year period. The new courthouse was officially inaugurated in 2008. In 2024, the wing that once housed the convent of Santa Maddalena was fully restored.

== Description ==
The courthouse is composed of three interconnected buildings: the original "Savoia" school building with the church of Maddalena and its cloister, a second structure facing Via Garibaldi, and a newly constructed facility fronting Via Borfuro.

The new building features a rectangular plan and combines steel and composite structures. It connects to the historic school complex through two projecting wings aligned with the existing geometry. The design respects the original structural grid, reusing foundation points and integrating long-span pre-stressed hollow-core slabs supported by slender steel columns. In the Via Borfuro façade, tall white steel columns reinterpret classical colonnades, supporting the structure through prefabricated brackets. Steel and glass elements were used to convey a contemporary identity while harmonizing with the surrounding urban fabric, achieving "a balanced integration of new architecture in a historic context".

== Sources ==
- Isola, Aimaro; Moretto, Luigi (2008). Corrispondenze con il paesaggio lombardo. Il nuovo tribunale di Bergamo. Florence: Aión Edizioni.
- Luca Moretto: l'architettura della formazione. Venice: Marsilio. 2006.
