= CERM =

Research facility at the Uni. of Florence

Coordinates: 43.8218°N 11.1937°E

CERM (European Center for Magnetic Resonance)
- Founder: Ivano Bertini
- Location: Sesto Fiorentino, Italy
- Website: https://www.cerm.unifi.it/

CERM (European Center for Magnetic Resonance, Italian: Centro Europeo di Risonanze Magnetiche) is a research facility at the University of Florence specialized in the application of NMR studies to biomolecules. It is a leading research center in Tuscany.

The center was founded by Ivano Bertini and it is located at the Polo Scientifico (Scientific Campus) in Sesto Fiorentino. It is supported by the European Community as a research infrastructure for NMR in the Life Sciences

== Scientific research ==
Under Bertini's leadership, CERM became one of the leading research centers in the world and it has a focus on structural biology, biophysics, and drug discovery. In 1994 at CERM the first structure of a metalloprotein was discovered through NMR using structural constraints due to the paramagnetic center.

In February 2020 CERM completed the installation of the most powerful NMR spectrometer in the world.
