= Brunangelo Falini =

Italian hematologist, academic and researcher

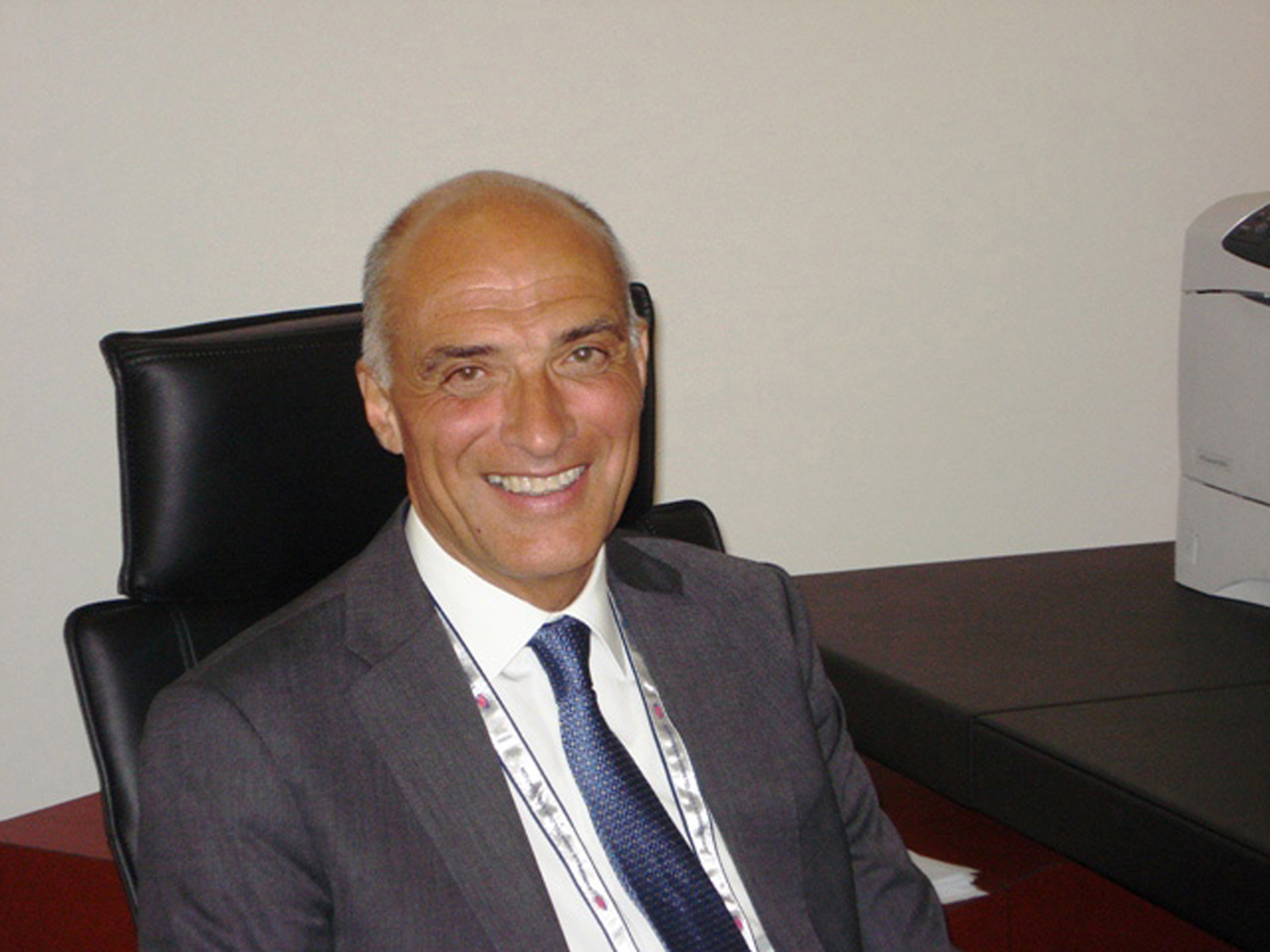
- Born: August 5, 1951 (age 75); Perugia
- Occupations: Hematologist, academic and researcher
- Awards: The Josè Carreras Award, European Hematology Association (EHA); The “Leopold Griffuel” prize, French Association for Cancer Research (ARC); The prize for “Excellence in Medicine”, American Italian Cancer Foundation (AICF); The “Henry Stratton Medal”, American Society of Hematology (ASH)

Academic background
- Education: M.D.
- Alma mater: University of Perugia

Brunangelo Falini is an Italian hematologist, academic and researcher. He is a Full Professor of Hematology, and Head of the Institute of Hematology and Bone Marrow Transplantation at University of Perugia.

Falini serves as a member of the International Lymphoma Study Group (ILSG) and has been in the Clinical Advisory Committees for the WHO classification of lympho-hemopoietic tumors (2001, 2008 and 2017 versions). He has made discoveries in the field of acute myeloid leukemia (AML) and lymphomas, going from bench to bedside.

== Education ==
Falini received his M.D. degree in 1976, and completed his specialization in Internal Medicine at University of Perugia. He was Research Fellow at University of Southern California (1980-1981) working on the lymphoma classification and then in United Kingdom at John Radcliffe Hospital, Oxford (1982-1984) working on strategies for generating novel monoclonal antibodies against lymphoid-associated antigens.

== Research ==
Falini's research contributions fall in the area of precision medicine. His scientific activity ranges from the field of monoclonal antibodies for diagnostic and therapeutic purposes to genomic studies on AML and hairy cell leukemia (HCL). His discoveries of NPM1 mutations in AML and BRAF-V600E in HCL, identified new mechanisms of leukemogenesis and resulted into improvement of the diagnosis, prognostic stratification, molecular monitoring and therapy of these hematological malignancies.

=== Monoclonal antibodies for diagnosis and therapy ===
Falini was a pioneer in the generation of novel monoclonal antibodies directed against oncoproteins involved in the pathogenesis of human lymphomas and leukemias, such as PML, BCL6, MUM1-IRF4, nucleophosmin (NPM1), ALK and IRTA1.

Falini also contributed to the development over time of modern classifications of lympho-hematopoietic neoplasms, including REAL (1994), WHO (2001), WHO (2008), and WHO (2017), that he all co-signed. Using monoclonal antibodies against ALK and NPM1, Falini and colleagues took major steps forward in the biological and clinical characterization of ALK-positive anaplastic large-cell lymphoma (ALCL) and in the identification of NPM1-mutated AML, greatly contributing to their inclusion, as new disease entities, in the WHO classification of lympho-hemopoietic neoplasms.

Falini also led the team that generated and used for the first time an immunotoxin directed against the CD30 molecule for the treatment of patients with refractory Hodgkin lymphoma.

=== Cancer Genetics ===
In 2005, stemming from his immunohistological studies on ALK-positive ALCL, Falini discovered that tumor cells from about one-third of adult AML (mostly carrying a normal cytogenetic) expressed aberrantly in the cytoplasm nucleophosmin (a nucleolar located protein). This finding prompted Falini and colleagues to sequence the NPM1 gene and to discover heterozygous mutations at exon 12, responsible for the aberrant nuclear export of the NPM1 mutant protein.

Falini's group also demonstrated that NPM1 mutations are AML specific and associated with a de novo origin of the disease. His research team then identified molecular variants of NPM1 mutations (other than exon 12), clarified the molecular mechanisms underlying the ectopic cytoplasmic accumulation of the NPM1 mutants and proposed that it plays a critical role in leukemogenesis. Falini and colleagues also discovered a unique gene expression and microRNA profile of NPM1-mutated AML and demonstrated that over-expression of HOX genes is closely related to the cytoplasmic delocalization of NPM1 mutants.

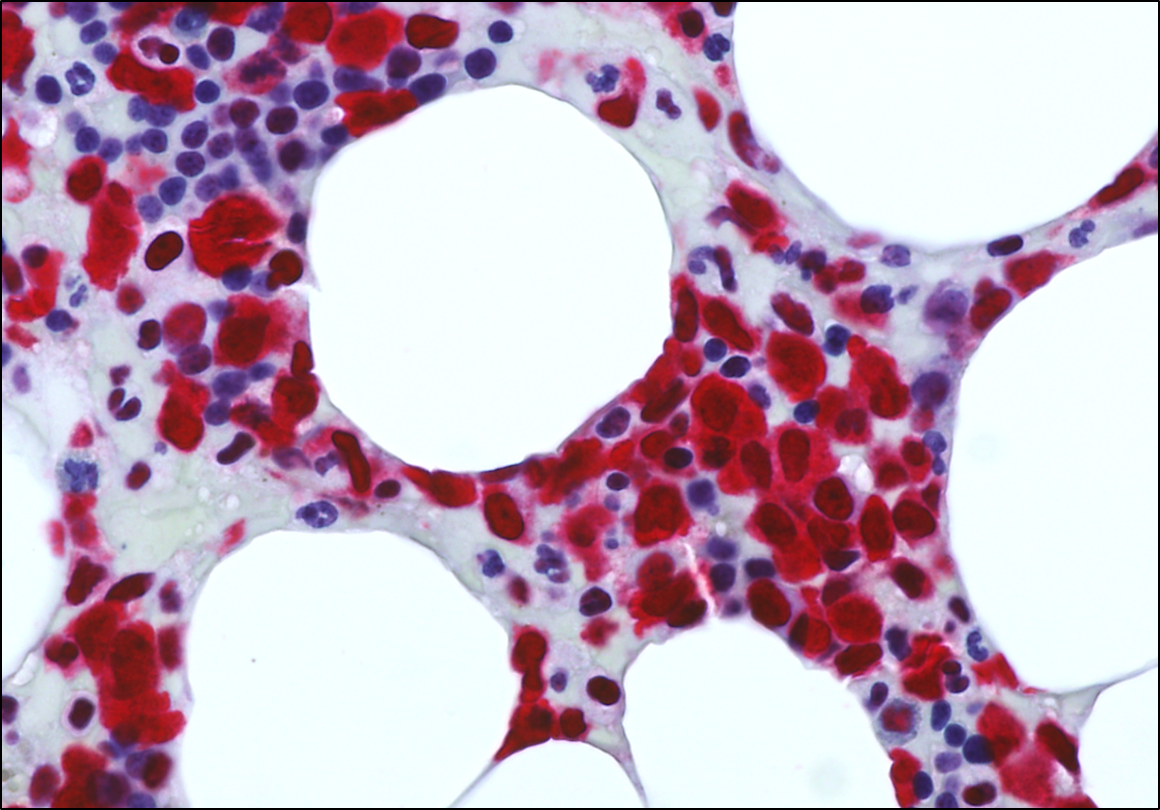
NPM1 immunostaining

Falini's team also demonstrated for the first time that NPM1 and FLT3-ITD mutations frequently co-occur in AML patients and proposed their cooperative role in promoting leukemia. Assessment of the NPM1 gene status and monitoring of measurable residual disease (MRD) by RT-quantitative PCR of NPM1 mutant copies (first reported by the Falini's group) is now recommended by the LeukemiaNet for genetic stratification and guiding therapeutic decisions in AML patients.

In 2011, using whole exome sequencing to further explore AML with normal karyotype, Falini led the team that first identified BCL6 co-repressor (BCOR) mutations as a new driver genetic lesion in AML and its association with DNMT3A mutations and with poor prognosis.

In 2012, Falini and colleagues discovered that the BRAF-V600E mutation represents the causal genetic event in HCL, triggering transformation through the constitutive activation of the RAF-MEK-ERK signaling pathway. Then, Falini's group went immediately from bench to bedside, establishing the first PCR diagnostic test for HCL and demonstrating the high clinical benefit of the BRAF inhibitor vemurafenib in heavily pre-treated refractory/relapsed HCL patients. More recently, Falini and colleagues reported that vemurafenib plus rituximab induces a durable complete response (often MRD negative) in most patients with refractory/relapsed HCL.

In 2018, Falini's group analyzing the genome of thousands microdissected Hodgkin and Reed-Sternberg tumor cells discovered recurrent mutations of STAT3, STAT5B, JAK1, JAK2 and PTPN1 that support the pivotal role of aberrant activation of JAK-STAT signalling pathway in the molecular pathogenesis of Hodgkin lymphoma.

== Awards and honors ==
- 2010 - The Josè Carreras Award, European Hematology Association (EHA)
- 2012 - The Karl Lennert Lecture/Award, European Association for Hematopathology (EAHP)
- 2014 - The Guido Venosta prize, Italian Federation for Cancer Research (FIRC/AIRC)
- 2015 - The Leopold Griffuel prize, French Association for Cancer Research (ARC)
- 2015 - The Adolfo Ferrata lecture/prize, Italian Association of Hematology (SIE)
- 2017 - The President of Italian Republic prize, Accademia Nazionale dei Lincei
- 2017 - The prize for Excellence in Medicine, American Italian Cancer Foundation (AICF)
- 2017 - The Celgene 2017 Career Achievement Award for Clinical Research in Hematology
- 2018 - The Henry Stratton Medal, American Society of Hematology (ASH)
- 2018 - Cavaliere di Gran Croce honor, President of Italian Republic

== Bibliography ==
- Falini B, Brunetti L, Martelli MP. NPM1-mutated acute myeloid leukemia: from bench to bedside Blood 136:17071721, 2020.
- Falini B, Brunetti L, Martelli MP. How I diagnose and treat NPM1-mutated AML. Blood 137:589-599, 2021.
- Tiacci E, Venanzi A, Ascani S, Marra A, Cardinali V, Martino G, Codoni V, Schiavoni G, Martelli MP, Falini B. High risk clonal hematopoiesis as the origin of AITL and NPM1-mutated AML N Engl J Med. 379:981-984, 2018.
- Falini B, Martelli MP, Tiacci E. BRAF V600E mutation in hairy cell leukemia: from bench to bedside. Blood. 128:1918-1927, 2016.
- Tiacci E, Falini B. Genomics of hairy cell leukemia. J Clin Oncol. 35:1002-1010, 2017.
- Sportoletti P, Sorcini D, Falini B. BCOR gene alteration in hematological diseases. Blood2021 May 4:blood.2021010958. doi: 10.1182/blood.2021010958. Online ahead of print. PMID 33945606
