= Roberto Gabetti =

Italian architect

- Born: 29 November 1925; Turin, Kingdom of Italy
- Died: 5 December 2000 (aged 75); Turin, Italy
- Education: Polytechnic University of Turin
- Occupations: Architect, designer, photographer

Roberto Gabetti (29 November 1925 – 5 December 2000) was an Italian architect, designer and photographer.

== Life and career ==
A student of Giovanni Muzio, Gabetti graduated in 1949 at the Polytechnic University of Turin, where he became professor of Architectural Composition in 1967. He played a key role in reforming the school's educational model and was director of the Central Architecture Library until 1986.

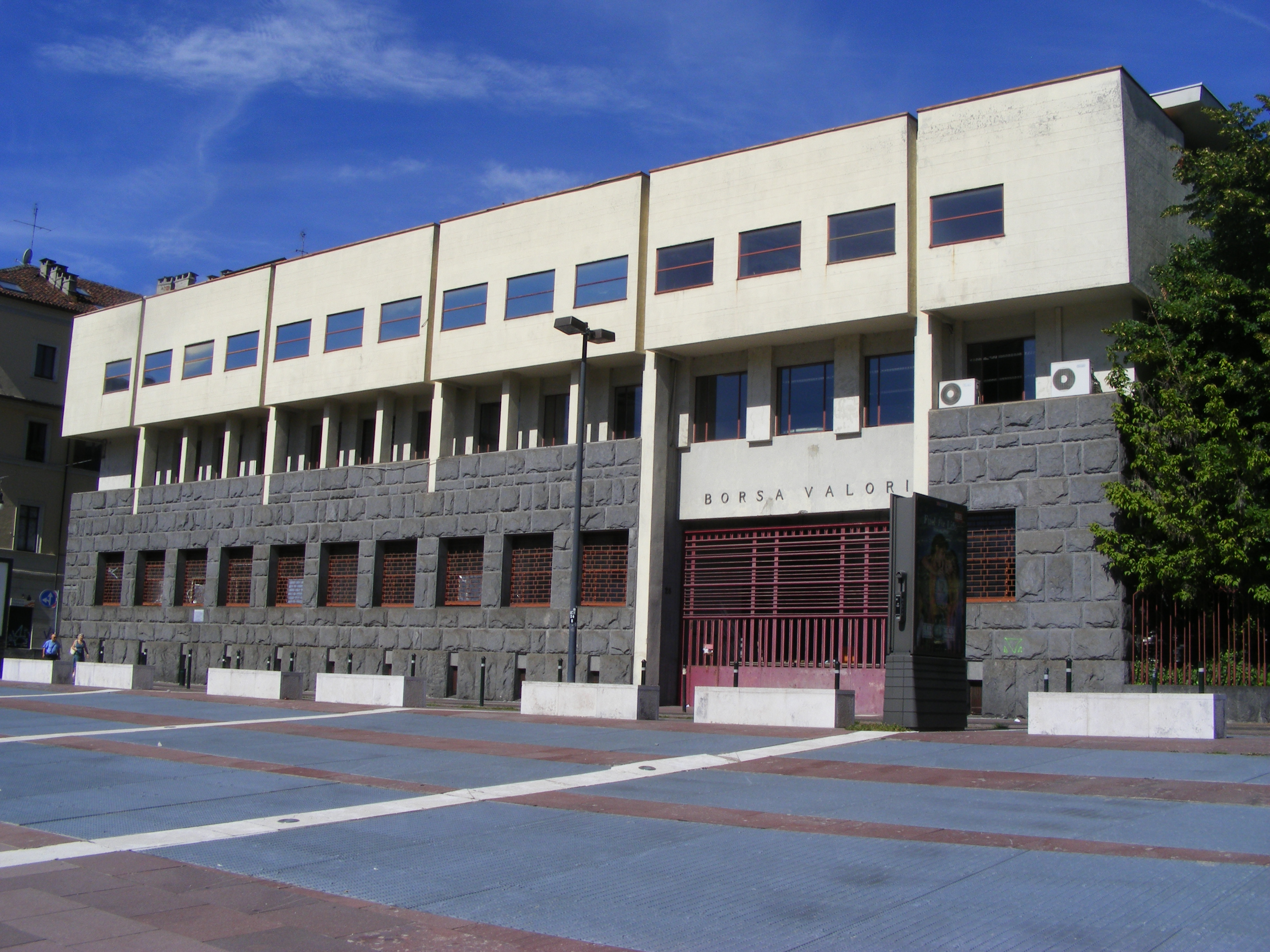
Palazzo della Borsa Valori

In the early 1950s, Gabetti co-founded a practice with Aimaro Oreglia d'Isola, with whom he collaborated throughout his career. Their early works—such as the Palazzo della Borsa Valori (1952) and the Bottega d'Erasmo (1954) in Turin—marked a deliberate departure from the International Style, embracing "a polemical return of the disciplined rigor of the eclectic method" (Treccani). Gabetti became known as one of the leading figures of the Neo-liberty movement.

His most notable works include the Olivetti Residential Center in Ivrea (1969–74), the Carmelite monastery in Quart (1985–89), and the church of San Giovanni Battista in Desio (1994–99).

He died in Turin in 2000. Gabetti's design works are included in the permanent collections of the Museum of Modern Art (MoMA) in New York and the Centre Pompidou in Paris.

== Books (selection) ==
- Alle radici dell'architettura contemporanea (with Carlo Olmo, 1989)
- Lezioni piemontesi (1997)
- Imparare l'architettura (1997)
- Case e chiese (1998)

== Awards ==
- Antonio Feltrinelli Prize from the Accademia Nazionale dei Lincei (1988)
- International Prize "Architectures in Stone" (1991)

== Sources ==
- Cellini, F.; D'Amato, C. (1985). Gabetti e Isola. Milan: Electa.
- Giriodi, Sisto (2020). Roberto Gabetti architetto e fotografo. Turin: Il Quadrante.
- Guerra, A.; Morresi, M. (1996). Gabetti e Isola: Opere di architettura. Milan: Electa.
- Pace, S.; Reinerio, L. (2005). Architetture per la liturgia. Opere di Gabetti e Isola. Milan: Skira.
- Olmo, Carlo Maria (2022). Studiare Roberto Gabetti. Macerata: Quodlibet.
- P. Zermani, ed. (1989). Gabetti e Isola. Bologna: Zanichelli.
