= Piazza Statuto =

Coordinates: 45.07629°N 7.67068°E

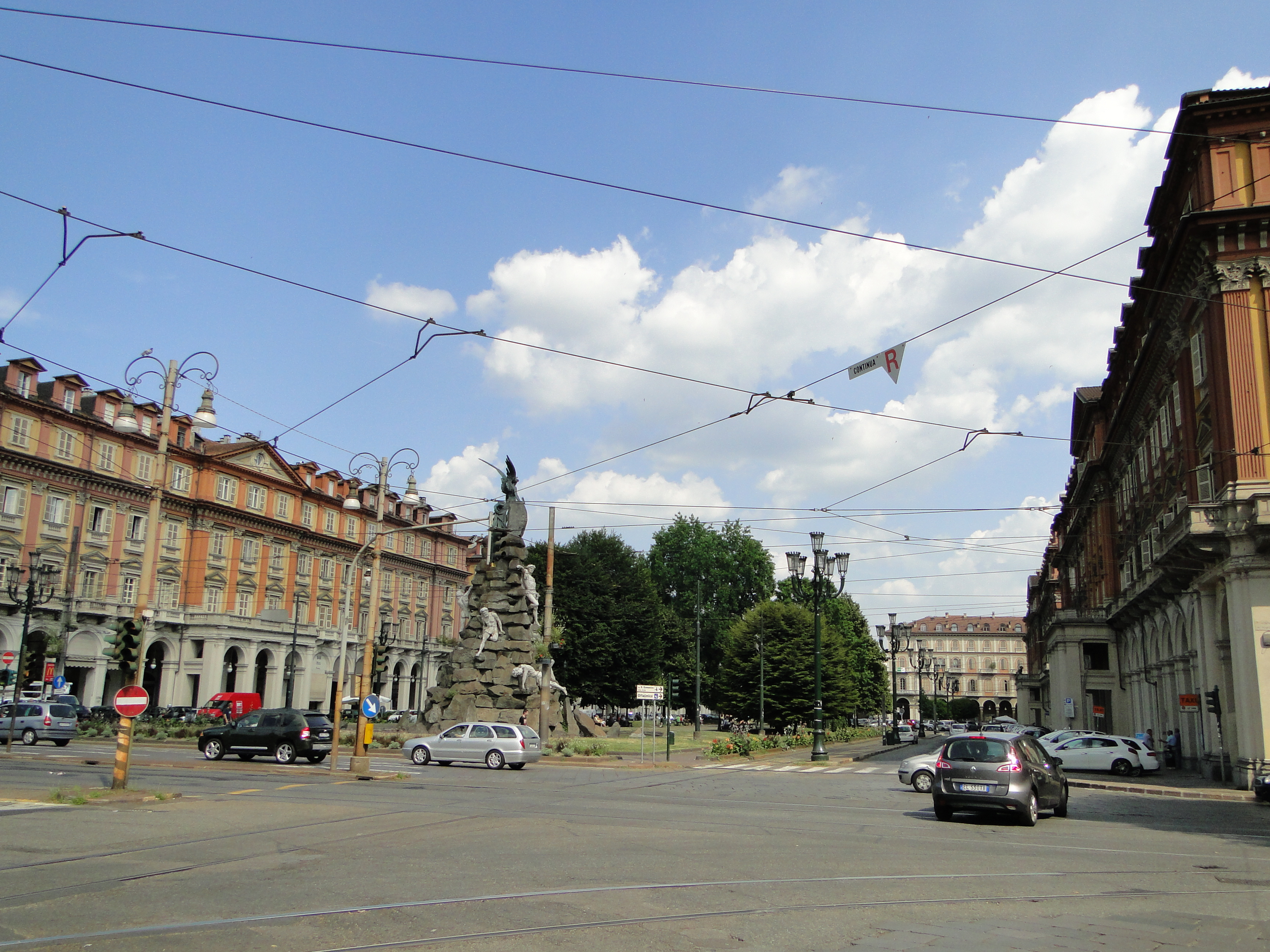
Piazza Statuto

Piazza Statuto is a city square in Turin, Italy.

== Buildings around the square ==
- Fréjus Rail Tunnel
- Torre BBPR
