= Fernando Clemente =

Italian architect

- Born: 17 December 1917; Sassari, Kingdom of Italy
- Died: 16 March 1998 (aged 80)
- Education: University of Florence
- Occupations: Architect, urban planner

Fernando Clemente (17 December 1917 – 16 March 1998) was an Italian architect and urban planner.

== Life and career ==
Clemente graduated at the University of Florence, where he was a student of Giovanni Michelucci. In the 1950s, he designed the villages of Masone Pardu, Olia Speciosa, Tottubella, and Uccari in Sardinia.

In the 1960s, he became the director of the Institute of Technical Architecture at the University of Bologna, succeeding Michelucci. He also worked on the master plans for Pisa, Lucca, Sassari, Florence, and Bologna.

Between 1975 and 1995, Clemente served as the director of the Institute of Urban Planning at the Faculty of Engineering of the University of Cagliari, and later as the first director of the Department of Land Engineering.

In 2004, the library of the Faculty of Architecture at the University of Sassari in Alghero was named after him. In 2010, the Sardinian section of the National Institute of Urban Planning (INU) named an award after him.

== Works (selection) ==
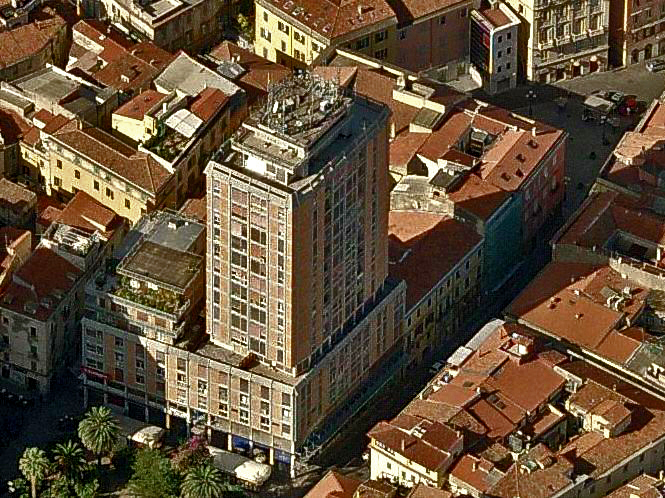
"New Skyscraper" Sassari, 1965

- New and old skyscraper, (1952–1965), Sassari
- District of Latte Dolce, Sassari
- Faculty of Veterinary, 1966, Parma
- Faculty of Agrarian Studies, 1967, Sassari
- Reconstruction of the Ancona Courthouse, 1975–1989, Ancona

== Writings ==
- Clemente, Fernando, La pianificazione territoriale in Sardegna, Gallizzi, Sassari, 1964.
- Clemente, Fernando, Un'esperienza di prefabbricazione pesante nell'edilizia, Gallizzi, Sassari, 1965.
- Clemente Fernando (editor), Pianificazione del territorio e sistema informativo, Angeli, Milano, 1984.
- Clemente Fernando (editor), Cultura del paesaggio e metodi del territorio, Janus, Cagliari, 1987.

== Sources ==
- "Fernando Clemente". Urbanisti italiani. Istituto Nazionale di Urbanistica. 1954. p. 86.
- Lucchini M., L'identità molteplice. Architettura contemporanea in Sardegna dal 1930 al 2008, Aìsara, Cagliari, 2009.
- Zoppi, C. (2000). "Alcune riflessioni sull'opera di Fernando Clemente nel quadro recente della pianificazione del territorio in Sardegna". Etica e pianificazione spaziale. Scritti in onore di Fernando Clemente. Milan: Angeli. pp. 364–382.
- Alessandro Plaisant; Arnaldo Cecchini, eds. (2005). Analisi e modelli per la pianificazione. Teoria e pratica: lo stato dell'arte. Milan: FrancoAngeli. p. 11.
