= Aldo Andreani =

Italian architect and sculptor

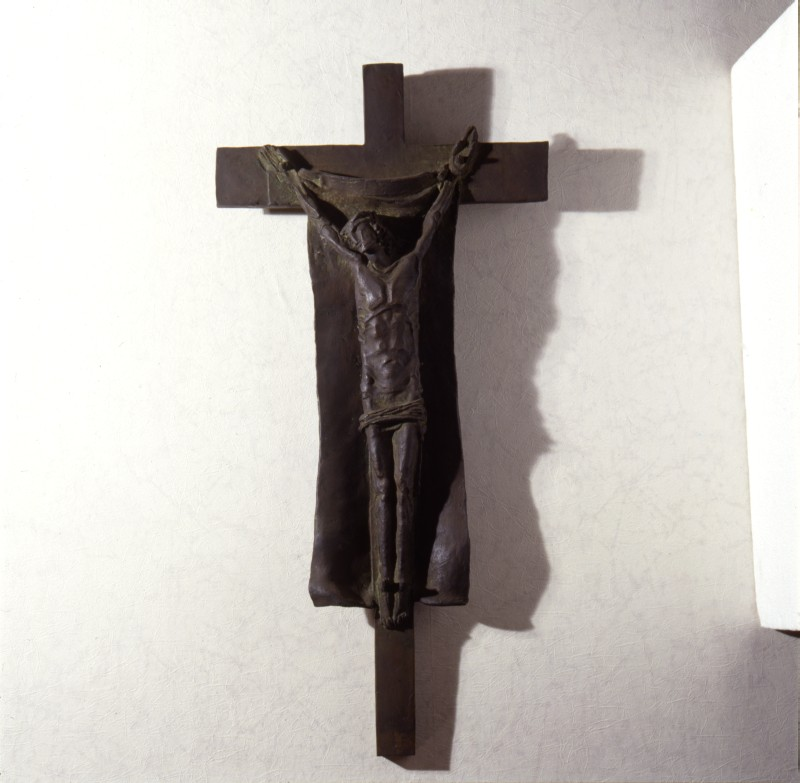
Crocifisso, 1935 (Art collections of Fondazione Cariplo)

Aldo Andreani (August 1, 1887 in Mantua – October 18, 1971 in Milano) was an Italian architect and sculptor.

== Biography ==
Andreani trained as an architect at the San Luca Academy in Rome and then graduated from the Milan Polytechnic under the guidance of Gaetano Moretti. He moved to Milan at the end of World War I and combined the study of sculpture with a flourishing architectural career initiated in Mantua in 1909 and based on that city’s Renaissance models.

He began attending the first special course in sculpture at the Brera Academy, in Milan, in 1927, and developed a new interest in the solidity of volumes and simplification of forms under the guidance of his teacher Adolph Wildt. He was active as a sculptor above all in the 1930s with a large range of portraits and religious works as well as allegories and celebrations of the Fascist regime serving as architectural decoration. Andreani held his first solo show at the Galleria Pesaro in Milan from December 1931 to January 1932 and took part in the Venice Biennial (Esposizione Internazionale d’Arte della città di Venezia) in 1934 and the Paris International Exposition in 1937, where he was awarded a silver medal for a series of decorative high-relief works for the vestibule of the Italian Pavilion.

As an architect, he received major commissions for residential buildings in Mantua and in Milan, where he was also involved in the renovation of Piazza San Babila.

== Bibliography ==
- Chiara Baglione, Cronaca di un progetto. Palazzo Fidia a Milano, in "Casabella", 706-707, dicembre 2002-gennaio 2003, pp. 75–86.
- Elena Lissoni, Aldo Andreani, online catalogue Artgate by Fondazione Cariplo, 2010, CC BY-SA (source for the first revision of this article).
