= Metal-ligand cooperativity =

Metal-ligand cooperativity (MLC) is a mode of reactivity in which a metal and ligand of a complex are both involved in the bond breaking or bond formation of a substrate during the course of a reaction. This ligand is an actor ligand rather than a spectator, and the reaction is generally only deemed to contain MLC if the actor ligand is doing more than leaving to provide an open coordination site. MLC is also referred to as "metal-ligand bifunctional catalysis." Note that MLC is not to be confused with cooperative binding.

The earliest reported metal-ligand cooperativity was from the Fujiwara group in the 1950s, in which they reported formation of stilbene from styrene and arenes using a palladium chloride catalyst. Shvo's catalyst was developed for one of the earliest uses of ketone hydrogenation by an outer-sphere mechanism. Noyori has developed many chiral catalysts for asymmetric hydrogenation. Transfer hydrogenation, one of the most commonly used applications of MLC, is employed broadly in industry for large scale Noyori-type reductions.

== Modes of Metal-Ligand Cooperativity ==
There are a variety of modes in which this cooperativity has been demonstrated. Four primary modes are generally accepted under MLC: the ligand can (1) act with Lewis acidity, (2) act with Lewis basicity, (3) play a role in aromatization and dearomatization, or (4) be redox non-innocent.

The ligand can act as a Lewis acid and accept electrons from an incoming substrate as it binds to the metal, as in employed in dehydrogenation catalysis. Conversely, the ligand can be Lewis basic and bind the substrate; this Lewis basicity is most frequently seen in hydrogenation catalysis.

The aromatization and dearomatization of a ligand can serve to facilitate a reaction. As shown in the figure, a ligand can be dearomatized by a base and thus activated toward cleaving a C-H or H-H bond and be subsequently rearomatized during substrate bond cleavage. NHC ligands and other pincer ligands are frequently employed in this mode of MLC. In some reports, with bidentate ligands, ligand dearomatization is not observed when the complex is treated with base but rather a complex with a formal metal-carbon bond is observed (that then acts as a Lewis basic ligand). In fact, the aromatization–dearomatization MLC pathway is governed by the acid–base properties of the reaction medium. Under basic conditions, the ligand preferentially undergoes dearomatization, whereas under acidic conditions, the aromatized form is thermodynamically favored.

The ligand can also be redox non-innocent to facilitate reactions that the metal would otherwise be unable to activate. The ligand can act as an electron reservoir, which is enabled when ligands contain frontier orbitals of suitable energy to participate in the redox event themselves, and can accept or donate electrons during the course of the reaction, allowing the metal to modulate its oxidation state. This allows metals which normally only participate in one electron regimes to be used in two electron regimes with a redox non-innocent ligand to store electrons during the reaction. Dithiolate ligands have been used extensively as one electron redox active ligands in metal complexes. For example, dithiolates have been demonstrated to allow for the selective and reversible reduction of ethylene in the presence H_{2}, CO, and H_{2}S. This has applications in the purification of ethylene gas streams, in which ethylene can be reduced electrochemically by a dithiolate, selectively removed from the impurities in the stream, and then reversibly desaturated.

Electrochemical metal-ligand cooperativity in redox reactions allows for ease of tuning the potential of the ligands to avoid off-target reactivity.

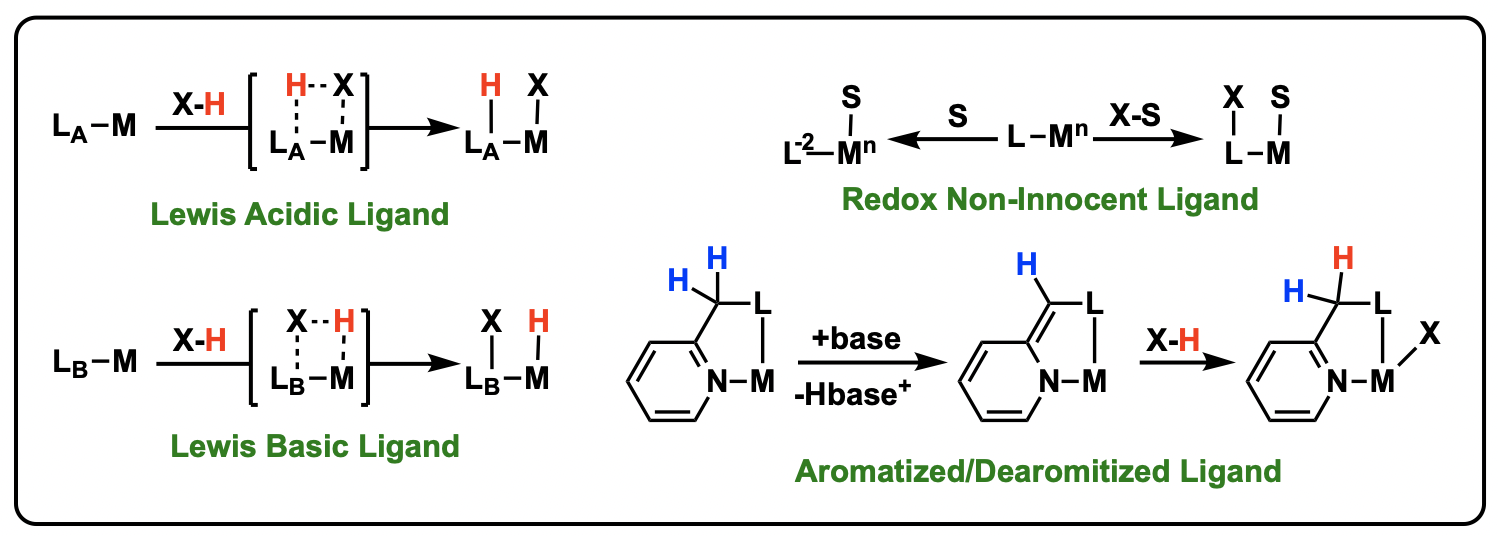
Modes of metal ligand cooperativity where X-H and X-S are some substrates.

There are a number of other ligand modes of reactivity which are sometimes classified under MLC. This includes reactions in which the ligand accepts or loses a proton, though not directly from or to the substrate. Ligands can also be used to form stabilizing H-bonds, which can be applied in molecular recognition catalysis. Ligands can also be designed to be photoresponsive, with applications in molecular switches. Ligands may also be considered to be involved in MLC while acting only in the second coordination sphere (not directly bound to the metal) but acting as a proton shuttle. Frustrated Lewis pairs, in which an ion pair of the type [R_{3}B-H]^{−}[H-Ar_{3}]^{+} transfer a hydride and proton are also sometimes classified under MLC.

== Mechanism of Hydrogenations with Metal-Ligand Cooperativity ==
MLC is most frequently used in hydrogenations, with many applications in asymmetric catalysis and in process scale production of chemicals. In a hydrogenation, there is a transfer of a hydride and a hydrogen to a substrate. Typical substrates include aldehydes, ketones, and imines. As this is a common use for MLC, it is instructive in understanding the mechanism of metal-ligand cooperativity. MLC occurs through an outer sphere mechanism. An outer sphere mechanism does not necessitate that the metal undergo oxidative addition or reductive elimination. Thus, H_{2} is not added across the metal, but rather across the metal and a ligand; alternatively, the metal complexes are preformed to contain a hydride ligand as well as a ligand with a hydrogen alpha to the metal. Thus, the hydride and hydrogen are adjacent to one another, facilitating the transfer to the substrate; this transfer occurs without the substrate ever binding to the metal itself. Though amine is by far the most used ligand in cooperativity, other actor ligands include alkoxides and thiols.

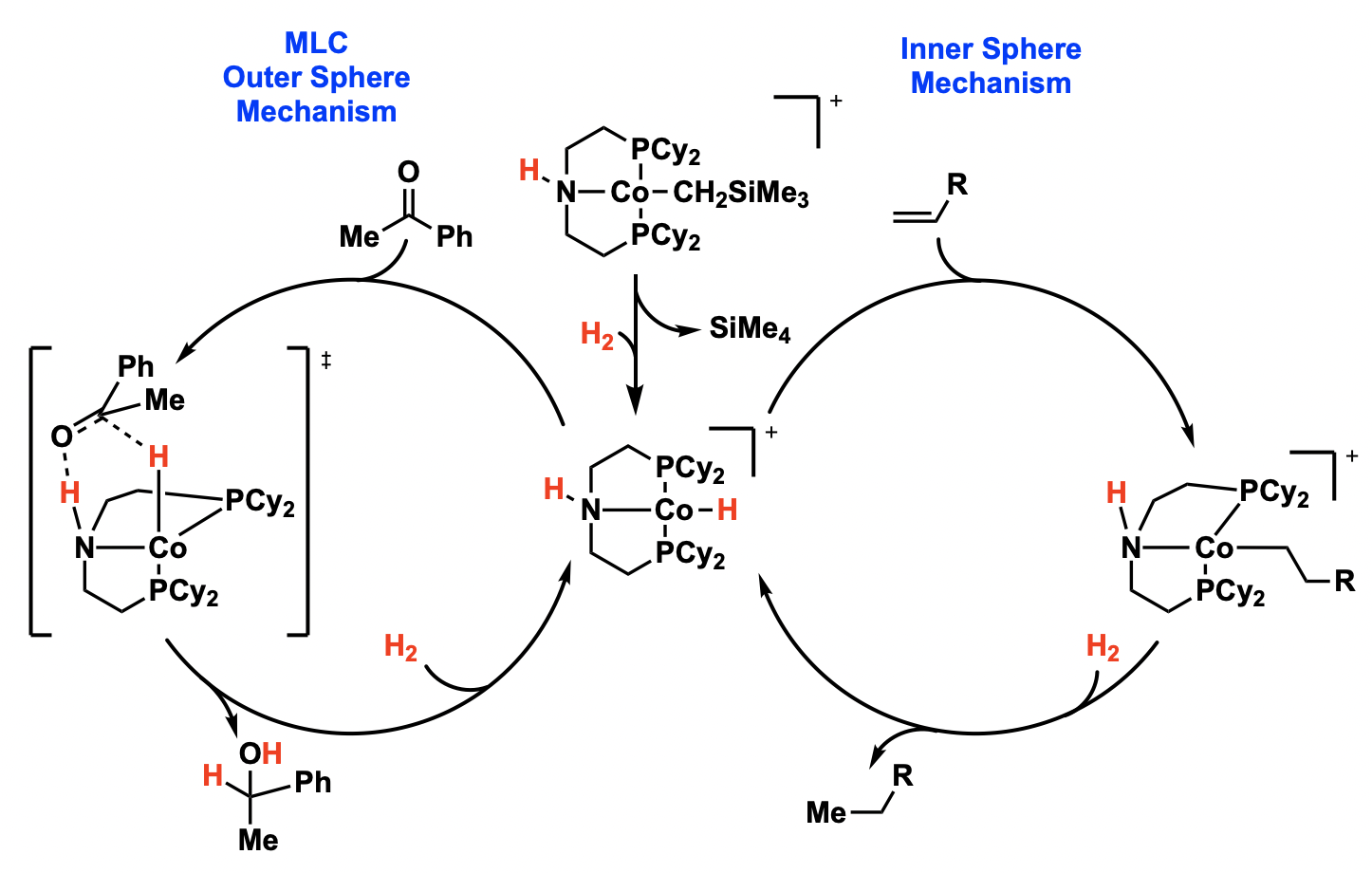
The outer sphere mechanism for MLC compared to an inner sphere mechanism without ligand cooperativity.

In contrast, in an inner sphere mechanism, the substrate will be inserted into the metal and reaction with hydrogen will then afford the hydrogenated product. This mechanism does not employ MLC. The differentiation between an outer sphere mechanism relying on MLC and an inner sphere mechanism is exemplified by cobalt hydrogenation with an amine pincer ligand. In the outer sphere mechanism, the hydrogen on the pincer ligand is added into the ketone along with a hydride ligand on the metal. It is worth noting that there is debate over the concertedness of the transition state of this outer sphere hydrogenation step, and different reactions and catalysts may be either concerted or stepwise, and in some scenarios there may be multiple pathways at play. In comparison to the ketone hydrogenation, an olefin undergoes an inner sphere mechanism under the same reaction conditions, in which the olefin inserts directly into the metal. These mechanistic differences between the ketone and olefin are corroborated by the observation that the ketone hydrogenation will not occur with an N-Me pincer ligand, and the olefin hydrogenation will proceed with the N-Me ligand, suggesting the ketone requires the presence of the N-H bond while the olefin does not.

== Common Ligands ==
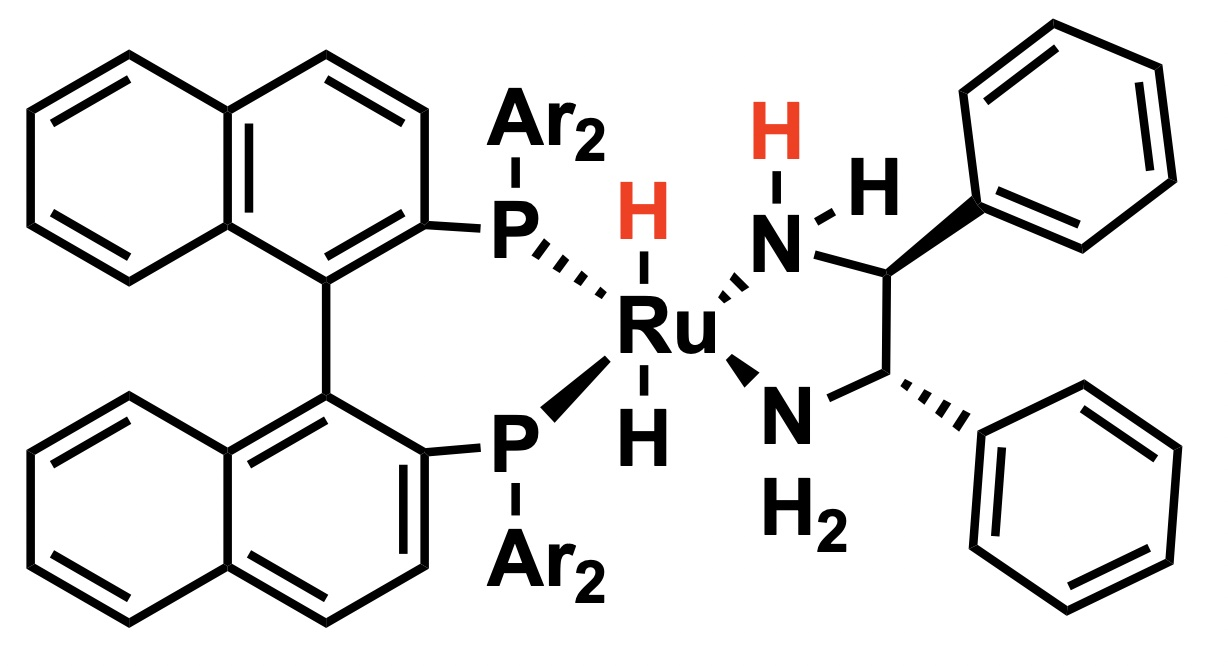
Ruthenium diphosphine diamine complex

MLC is most broadly used with M-NH systems. Nyori and others have developed an extensive library of diamine ligands which serve in hydrogenation reactions, following the general outer sphere mechanism illustrated above. These systems are typically ruthenium complexes containing phosphine ligands as the spectator ligands. Many of these diphosphine ligands, such as BINAP, contain arene rings and impart chirality from atropisomerism; the rigidity of the phosphene ligands can impart chirality on prochiral substrates with high fidelity, allowing for asymmetric hydrogenation. Reactivity of metal complexes used in MLC can be tuned greatly by the use of different diphosphine spectator ligands.

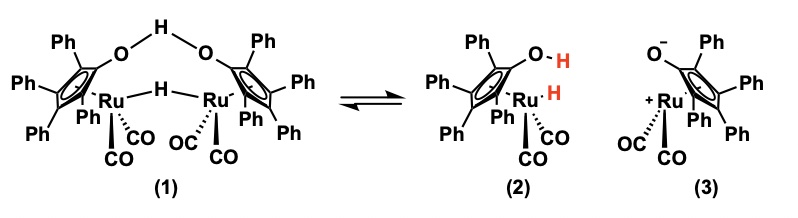
Shvo’s catalyst and its dissociated state, in which the 18e- complex (2) is the active form

M-OH metal ligand systems have application in MLC. Shvo's catalyst was one of the earliest complexes developed for ketone and aldehyde reductions to alcohols. The ruthenium complex (1), upon heating, dissociates into a 18 electron complex (2) and a 16 electron complex (3), the former of which is catalytically active. The hydroxy group on the cyclopentadienyl is the actor ligand, donating a hydrogen in an outer sphere mechanism. Bäckvall has developed use for Shvo's catalyst in the dynamic kinetic resolution of alcohols with lipases.

Bergman and coworkers developed a sulfur ligand for activation of H-H as well as Si-H bonds. A titanium sulfide complex binds H_{2} across the titanium and sulfur, yielding a hydride and thiol ligand. A similar mode of reactivity is seen with H-Si bonds, in which the sulfide forms a bond with the silicon, and the titanium accepts the hydride. The use of sulfur ligands in MHC has continued to expand since Bergman's early work in the field. Iridium and rhenium complexes with bridging sulfides have been demonstrated to heterolytically cleave H_{2}.

Metal boron complexes have also been demonstrated to be useful in activating H_{2}. These ligands are less developed for the purpose of MLC, and commonly suffer from off target alkyl and aryl migration from the boron ligand to other ligands or substrates which disrupts the catalytic cycle
