= Ivano Bertini =

Italian chemist (1940–2012)

- Born: December 6, 1940; Pisa, Italy
- Died: July 7, 2012 (aged 71); Florence, Italy
- Education: University of Florence
- Known for: NMR spectroscopy of metalloproteins
- Awards: Bijvoet Medal (1998)
- Scientific career
- Fields: Bioinorganic chemistry
- Workplaces: University of Florence
- Doctoral advisor: Luigi Sacconi

Ivano Bertini (December 6, 1940 – July 7, 2012) was an Italian chemist recognized for his significant contributions in the field of bioinorganic chemistry, particularly in NMR spectroscopy of metalloproteins.

== Early life and education ==
Bertini was born in Pisa, Italy, in 1940. He completed his graduation in 1964 at the University of Florence in inorganic chemistry, under the guidance of Luigi Sacconi. After graduation, he became Sacconi's assistant and started his research in inorganic physical chemistry and isomerism in coordination compounds. He had his first trips abroad to the Zurich Polytechnic in 1965 and Princeton University, where he began his studies of bioinorganic chemistry using NMR.

== Career ==
In 1975, Bertini became a full professor of chemistry at the Faculty of Pharmacy of the University of Florence, and in 1981, at the Faculty of Mathematical, Physical and Natural Sciences. He founded the European Magnetic Resonance Center (CERM), based at the Scientific Campus of Sesto Fiorentino, in 1999.

His research on the structure of metalloproteins resulted in a significant number of publications, earning him international recognition. He received honorary degrees in chemistry from the Universities of Stockholm (1998) and Ioannina (2002), and in biology from the University of Siena (2003). In addition to other international awards, he was a member of the Academia Europaea and the National Lincei Academy.

He also served on the editorial or advisory boards of over 20 journals spanning chemistry, biochemistry, and inorganic chemistry.

His later studies made it possible to identify through NMR spectrometry a fingerprint corresponding to the metabolome in the blood and urine specific to each human being, a discovery that could have significant implications in medicine.

== Death and legacy ==
Bertini died in 2012 in Florence.

He authored over 650 research papers and published over 150 protein structures.

== Works ==
- Bertini, Ivano; Gray, Harry B.; Lippard, Stephen J.; Valentine, Joan Selverstone (1994). Bioinorganic Chemistry. Mill Valley: University Science Books. ISBN 0935702571.
- Bertini, Ivano; Sigel, Astrid; Sigel, Helmut (2001). Handbook on Metalloproteins. CRC Press. ISBN 9780824705206.
- Bertini, Ivano; Luchinat, Claudio; Parigi, Giacomo (2001). Solution NMR of Paramagnetic Molecules: applications to metallobiomolecules and models. Amsterdam: Elsevier. ISBN 0444205292.
- Bertini, Ivano; Gray, Harry B.; Stiefel, Edward I.; Valentine, Joan Selverstone (2007). Biological Inorganic Chemistry: Structure & Reactivity. Sausalito: University Science Books. ISBN 978-1891389436.
