= Pentavalent uranyl complexes =

U^{V} is the +5 oxidation state of uranium which is found in the form of [UO_{2}]^{1+}. This species is known as pentavalent uranyl cation and has a low stability due to the disproportionation into tetravalent and hexavalent uranium species.

2U^{V} → U^{IV} + U^{VI}

The oxidation states of uranium compounds vary from +2 to +6 (U^{II} - U^{VI}). Out of all these oxidation states +6 is the most common one and it is found in the form of [UO_{2}]^{2+} (uranyl dication). This hexavalent form of uranium species is known to be the most thermodynamically stable species and it is soluble in water. Even though the uranium chemistry is well explored pentavalent uranyl chemistry is under developed due to the low stability of these compounds. There are two naturally occurring pentavalent uranium-containing minerals reported.

1. Wyartite – Ca[U^{V}(U^{VI}O_{2})_{2}(CO_{3})O_{4}(OH)](H_{2}O)_{7}
2. Dehydrated Wyartite – Ca(CO_{3})[U^{V}(U^{VI}O_{2})_{2}O_{4}(OH)](H_{2}O)_{3}

== Synthesis ==
Pentavalent uranyl complexes are obtained by the oxidation of U^{IV} or other low-valent uranium compounds and these reactions are done under oxygen-free conditions in organic solvents. The oxidation of U^{III} and U^{IV} precursors under non-aqueous conditions or controlled hydrolysis conditions gives large polyoxo uranium clusters containing U^{V}. Hydrothermal synthesis is another method used to obtain U^{V} silicates where the reactions are carried out under high temperatures like 600 °C. Another way to make pentavalent uranyl complexes is the reduction of U^{VI} containing [UO_{2}]^{2+}. In this method hexavalent uranyl complexes are reduced to U^{V} complexes in aqueous solutions using electrochemical or photochemical reductions in the presence of a stabilizing carbonate or organic ligand.

An example for the use of electrochemical reduction method to obtain pentavalent uranyl complexes is shown below:

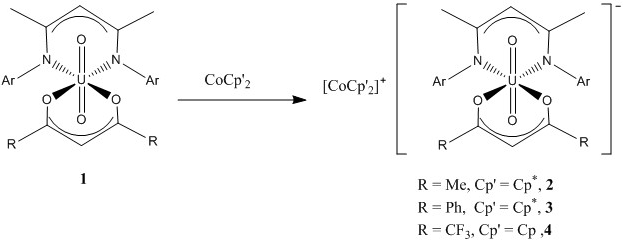
Figure 1. Synthesis of pentavalent uranyl complexes using electrochemical reduction method

Hexavalent uranyl complexes with different β-diketonate ligands (R= Me, Ph, CF_{3}) are used for this reduction of uranyl dication ([UO_{2}]^{2+}). The introduction of electron withdrawing substituents at the R position of the β-diketonate ligand favors the reduction of hexavalent uranyl complexes. These electrochemical reductions are carried out with CoCp_{2}⋅ or CoCp_{2} in toluene and the reduction potential is measured using cyclic voltammetry.

== Coordination Chemistry ==
Given below are some of the pentavalent uranyl compounds reported recently.

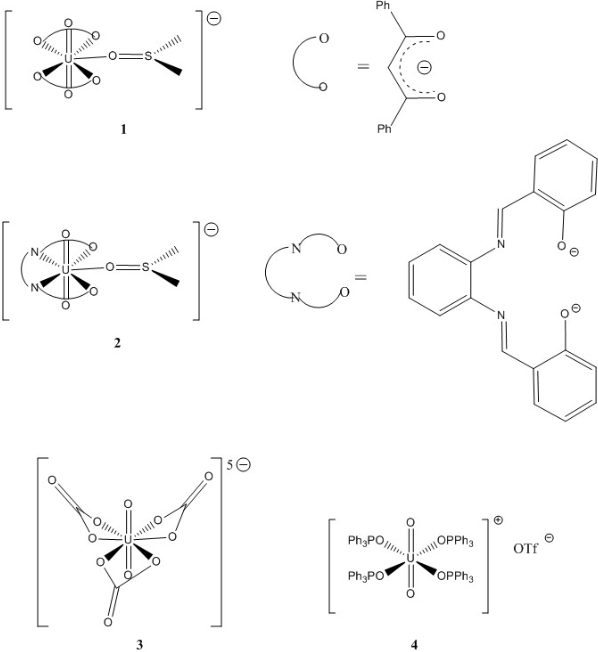
Figure 2. Some examples of [UO_{2}]^{1+}

The electrochemical reduction of [UO_{2}]^{2+} in an anaerobic solution is used to obtain pentavalent uranyl complexes (Figure 2. Compound 1-3). The coordination numbers of complexes 1-4 are 7, 7, 8 and 6. The rate of disproportionation of U^{V} which results U^{IV} and U^{VI} is reported to be slow in an aqueous medium with pH 2-4 hence U^{V} is obtained via electrochemical reduction. In these compounds tetradentate Schiff-base phenoxide (salophen) and β-diketonate ligands are bound along the equatorial plane, which stabilizes the U^{V} species obtained by the single electron reduction of U^{VI} species. Anhydrous uranyl triflate compounds (Figure 2, compound 4) contains discrete cation-anion pairs and it is synthesized by the crystallization of [UO_{2}(OPPh_{3})_{4}][OTf]_{2}. U^{V} containing cation in this uranyl triflate compound shows an octahedral geometry.

== Hazards ==
All uranium compounds are radioactive and toxic. Uranium compounds cause blood disorders, chronic kidney disease, acute tubular necrosis, chronic fatigue and congenital disorders. The target organs are kidneys, liver, lungs and brain. Uranyl salts are neurotoxins and accumulates in bones, liver, kidneys, and reproductive tissues. U^{VI} in the form of [UO_{2}]^{2+} being soluble in water acts as a ground water contaminant.
