= Carlo Floriani =

Italian inorganic chemist

Carlo Floriani was an inorganic chemist who gained renown for contributions to organometallic and coordination chemistry. He was born in Casalmaggiore, Cremona (Italy) in 1940 and died in 2005. He held positions at the University of Pisa, Columbia University, and Ecole Polytechnique, Lausanne. He had been a protoge of Fausto Calderazzo.

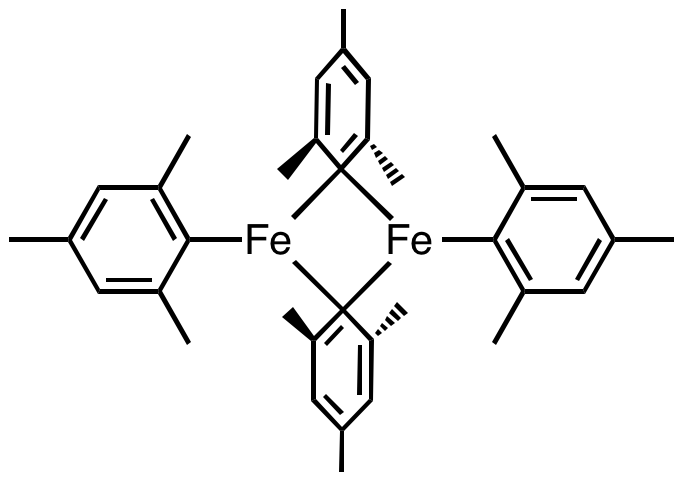
Structure of Tetramesityl diiron, first prepared by the Floriani group.

His contributions included small molecule activation including carbon dioxide complexes and dinitrogen complexes. He prepared several transition metal mesityl complexes such as tetramesityldiiron and gold mesityl.

He was recognized with the Centenary Prize, Royal Society of Chemistry.
