= Italian modern and contemporary art =

Art in Italy from the early 20th century onwards

Italian Contemporary art refers to painting and sculpture in Italy from the early 20th century onwards.

== Futurism ==
The founder and most influential personality of Futurism was the Italian writer Filippo Tommaso Marinetti, who launched the movement in his Futurist Manifesto in 1909.

The Futurists expressed a loathing of everything old, especially political and artistic tradition. They admired speed, technology, youth and violence, the car, the airplane and the industrial city, all that represented the technological triumph of humanity over nature, and they were passionate nationalists. The Futurists practised in every medium of art, including painting, sculpture, ceramics, graphic design, industrial design, interior design, theatre, film, fashion, textiles, literature, music, architecture and even gastronomy.

The leading painters of the movement were Umberto Boccioni, Carlo Carrà, Giacomo Balla and Gino Severini. They advocated a "universal dynamism," which was to be directly represented in painting. At first they used the techniques of Divisionism, breaking light and color down into a field of stippled dots and stripes, later adopting the methods of Cubism. In 1912, Boccioni turned to sculpture to translate into three dimensions his Futurist ideas.

Advocates of war as "the world's best hygiene," Marinetti, Boccioni, and Sant'Elia all volunteered to fight during World War One. The unofficial end of the first wave of Futurism (also known as the Heroic Years) was in 1916 - the same year Boccioni died in the war.

After the War, Marinetti revived the movement, seeking to make Futurism the official state art of Fascist Italy. The main expression of Futurism in painting in the 1930s and early 1940s was Aeropainting (aeropittura), launched in a manifesto of 1929, Perspectives of Flight, signed by Benedetta Cappa, Fortunato Depero, Gerardo Dottori, Fillìa, Marinetti, Enrico Prampolini, Somenzi and Tato. The technology and excitement of flight, directly experienced by most aeropainters, offered aeroplanes and aerial landscape as new subject matter.

Futurism had depended so much on its energetic promotion by Marinetti that his death in 1944 brought the movement to an end. Its association with Italian Fascism meant that most of its artists were shunned in the post-war years, but it has received scholarly attention in recent decades and a major exhibition was launched to coincide with the centenary in 2009. In 2014, the Solomon R. Guggenheim held a major Futurist retrospective featuring over 300 Futurist pieces spanning all media they worked in.

== Novecento Italiano ==
Novecento Italiano was an Italian artistic movement founded in Milan in 1922 by Anselmo Bucci (1887–1955), Leonardo Dudreville, Achille Funi, Gian Emilio Malerba, Piero Marussig, Ubaldo Oppi and Mario Sironi. Motivated by a post-war “call to order”, they were brought together by Lino Pesaro, a gallery owner interested in modern art, and Margherita Sarfatti, a writer and art critic who worked on Italian dictator Benito Mussolini’s newspaper, Il Popolo d'Italia. Sarfatti was also Mussolini’s mistress.

The movement was officially launched in 1923 at an exhibition in Milan, with Mussolini as one of the speakers. After being represented at the Venice Biennale of 1924, the group split and was reformed. The new Novecento Italiano staged its first group exhibition in Milan in 1926.

Several of the artists were war veterans; Sarfatti had lost a son in the war. The group wished to take on the Italian establishment and create an art associated with the rhetoric of Fascism. The artists supported the Fascist regime and their work became associated with the state propaganda department, although Mussolini reprimanded Sarfatti for using his name and the name of Fascism to promote Novecento.

The name of the movement (which means 1900s) was a deliberate reference to Italian art in the 15th and 16th centuries. The group rejected European avant garde art and wished to revive the tradition of large format history painting in the classical manner. It lacked a precise artistic programme and included artists of different styles and temperament, for example, Carrà and Marini. It aimed to promote a renewed yet traditional Italian art. Sironi said, “if we look at the painters of the second half of the 19th century, we find that only the revolutionary were great and that the greatest were the most revolutionary”; the artists of Novecento Italiano “would not imitate the world created by God but would be inspired by it”.

== Metaphysical art ==
Metaphysical art (Italian: Pittura metafisica) is the name of an Italian art movement, created by Giorgio de Chirico and Carlo Carrà. Their dream-like paintings of squares typical of idealized Italian cities, as well as apparently casual juxtapositions of objects, represented a visionary world which engaged most immediately with the unconscious mind, beyond physical reality, hence the name. The metaphysical movement provided significant impetus for the development of Dada and Surrealism.

== Classical modernism of the 20th century ==
At the beginning of the 20th century, Italian sculptors and painters joined the rest of Western Europe in the revitalization of a simpler, more vigorous, less sentimental Classical tradition, that was applied in liturgical as well as decorative and political settings. The leading sculptors included: Libero Andreotti, Arturo Martini, Giacomo Manzù, Nicola Neonato, Pietro Guida, Marcello Mascherini.

== Arte povera ==
The term Arte Povera was introduced in Italy during the period of upheaval at the end of the 1960s, when artists were taking a radical stance. Artists began attacking the values of established institutions of government, industry, and culture, and even questioning whether art as the private expression of the individual still had an ethical reason to exist. Italian art critic Germano Celant organized two exhibitions in 1967 and 1968, followed by an influential book called Arte Povera, promoting the notion of a revolutionary art, free of convention, the power of structure, and the market place. Although Celant attempted to encompass the radical elements of the entire international scene, the term properly centered on a group of Italian artists who attacked the corporate mentality with an art of unconventional materials and style.

The most wide-ranging public collection of works from the Arte Povera movement is at the Kunstmuseum Liechtenstein.

== Transavantgarde ==
Transavantgarde is the Italian version of Neo-expressionism, an art movement that swept through Italy, and the rest of Western Europe, in the late 1970s and 1980s. The term transavantgarde was coined by the Italian art critic, Achille Bonito Oliva, and literally means beyond the avant-garde. This art movement rejected conceptual art, reintroducing emotion―especially joy―back into painting and sculpture. The artists revived figurative art and symbolism. The principal transavantgarde artists were Sandro Chia, Francesco Clemente, Enzo Cucchi, Nicola de Maria, Mimmo Paladino, and Remo Salvadori.

== Interior design ==
Italian interior design in the 20th century was particularly well-known and grew to the heights of class and sophistication. At first, in the early 20th century, Italian furniture designers struggled to create an equal balance between classical elegance and modern creativity, and at first, Italian interior design in the 1910s and 1920s was very similar to that of French art deco styles, using exotic materials and creating sumptuous furniture. However, Italian art deco reached its pinnacle under Gio Ponti, who made his designs sophisticated, elegant, stylish and refined, but also modern, exotic and creative. In 1926, a new style of furnishing emerged in Italy, known as "Razionalismo", or "Rationalism". The most successful and famous of the Rationalists were the Gruppo 7, led by Luigi Figini, Gino Pollini and Giuseppe Terragni. Their styles used tubular steel and was known as being more plain and simple, and almost Fascist in style after c. 1934. After World War II, however, was the period in which Italy had a true avant-garde in interior design. With the fall of Fascism, rise of Socialism and the 1946 RIMA exhibition, Italian talents in interior decorating were made evident, and with the Italian economic miracle, Italy saw a growth in industrial production and also mass-made furniture. Yet, the 1960s and 1970s saw Italian interior design reach its pinnacle of stylishness, and by that point, with Pop and post-modern interiors, the phrases "Bel Designo" and "Linea Italiana" entered the vocabulary of furniture design.

== Artists ==
”Composizione”, 1959, Enrico Accatino

Michelangelo Pistoletto began painting on mirrors in 1962, connecting painting with the constantly changing realities in which the work finds itself. In the later 1960s he began bringing together rags with casts of omnipresent classical statuary of Italy to break down the hierarchies of "art" and common things. An art of impoverished materials is certainly one aspect of the definition of Arte Povera. In his 1967 Muretto di straci (Rag Wall) Pistoletto makes an exotic and opulent tapestry wrapping common bricks in discarded scraps of fabric.

Artists such as Jannis Kounellis and Mario Merz attempted to make the experience of art more immediately real while also more closely connecting the individual to nature.

The leading sculptors from 1930-40 to 2000 included Marino Marini, Emilio Greco, Pino Pascali, Mario Ceroli, Giovanni e Arnaldo Pomodoro, Umberto Mastroianni, Ettore Colla, Carmelo Cappello.

The leading painters from 1930-40 to 2000 included Alberto Savinio, Giorgio de Chirico, Giorgio Morandi, Alberto Magnelli, Felice Casorati, Roberto Melli, Corrado Cagli, Gianfilippo Usellini, Pietro Annigoni, Renato Guttuso, Lucio Fontana, Giovanni Capogrossi, Enrico Accatino, Antonio Donghi, Oreste Carpi, Fausto Pirandello, Afro Basaldella, Alberto Burri, Mimmo Rotella, Franco Nonnis, Domenico Gnoli, Valerio Adami, Piero Manzoni, Emilio Tadini, Salvatore Provino, Mino Argento.

A new breed of contemporary Italian artist such as Gaspare Manos are developing a more global language that draws on a vast international personal experience of life and culture stretching over several continents and many decades of travel. Such artist think locally and act globally, like Rabarama who has been the first Italian sculptor to collaborate with the Cirque du Soleil. An equivalent in Spain for example is the painter Miquel Barceló.

== Bibliography ==
- Miller, Judith (2005). Furniture: world styles from classical to contemporary. DK Publishing. ISBN 0-7566-1340-X.
