= Trento Longaretti =

Italian painter (1916–2017)

- Born: 27 September 1916; Treviglio, Province of Bergamo, Lombardy, Italy
- Died: 7 June 2017 (aged 100); Bergamo, Italy
- Known for: Painting, mosaic, fresco, stained glass
- Spouse: Elsa Ferrari (married 1945)
- Children: Serena (1946), Franco (1948), Maddalena (1954)

Trento Longaretti (27 September 1916 – 7 June 2017) was an Italian painter. He studied at the Brera Academy in the 1930s, where he was taught by renowned artists, including painters Aldo Carpi and Pompeo Borra, and sculptors Francesco Messina and Marino Marini. He stated that painting is an "elixir for long life", and continued to paint and exhibit as a centenarian.

He was on the fringes of the Corrente movement started by his friends and classmates in the 1930s to oppose the Novecento Italiano movement that was influenced by Italian Fascism. He was drafted by the Italian Army in 1939, completing tours of duty that until 1945 interrupted his artwork, though still enabling him to attend several exhibitions, including the Mostra degli artisti in armi exhibit at the Palazzo delle Esposizioni in Rome.

The themes of his post-war works involved more sacred art, and he adopted an anti-war stance and opposition to violence as a result of his wartime service, which features prominently in works depicting mothers opposing violence. Humility features in many of his works, including the depiction of characters such as beggars, vagrants, and vagabonds, and themes such as loneliness, abandonment, exile, pilgrimage, and poverty. Longaretti stated that he preferred creating works that are "accessible and immediately enjoyable". His oil paintings have been described as dense and oily like those of Paul Cézanne, and his style has similarities to the fantasy settings of Marc Chagall and "pictorial culture" of Egon Schiele. His still life paintings have been described as "delicate and almost religious".

He became involved in the Italian figurative art movement of the mid-1900s. His growing stature as a painter in Italy led to exhibitions at increasingly prestigious events, such as the Venice Biennale and Rome Quadriennale. It ultimately led to Longaretti earning the "Chair of Painting" and becoming the director of the Accademia Carrara in Bergamo in 1953, a position he held until he retired from it in 1978. He maintained studios in the città alta of Bergamo and in Corniglia within the Cinque Terre which he described as one of the most beautiful places in the world.

== Family ==
Longaretti was born on 27 September 1916 in the comune of Treviglio, in the Province of Bergamo in Lombardy. He was the ninth of thirteen children of his father Alessandro Longaretti and mother Maria Teresa Casirati. His parents named him after another sibling named Trento who died in infancy before Longaretti's birth. One of his sisters was named Trieste and brothers named Carlo, Giacinto, and Amanzio. He had fond memories of Christmas with his family, particularly the tree of zoccoli.

Since before his birth his family would vacation in Valpiana, a comune in the frazione of Serina north of the city of Bergamo. There in the 1940s, his older brother Giacinto took many photographs that he captioned before his death in 1945.

In 1945 he married Elsa Ferrari, whom he had met before being drafted and deployed during World War II. They had three children, Serena born in 1946, Franco born in 1948, and Maddalena born in 1954.

His brother Carlo disappeared in 1976.

In his late 90s, he was described by L'Eco di Bergamo as having a firm hand and a "mind that travels". Each Christmas, he presented a gift of a painting to each of his children.

== Education ==
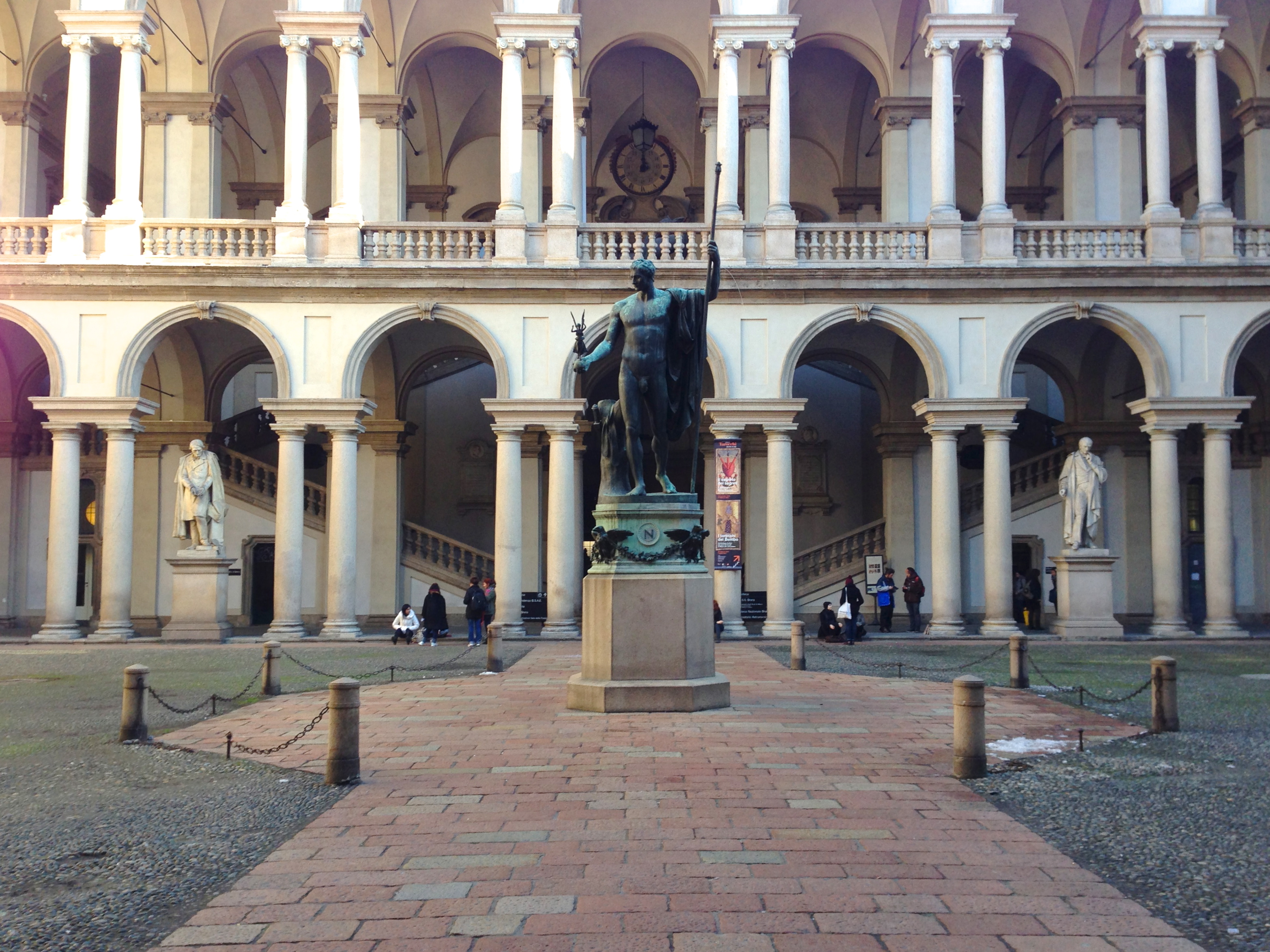
Courtyard of the Brera Academy, where Longaretti studied art in the 1930s

He attributed to his first grade teacher Maciocchi "understanding my primary talent in life", who nurtured his talent by giving him postcards to copy. From 1930 until his graduation in 1936 he attended the Liceo Artistico di Brera, an art-oriented high school in Milan affiliated with the Brera Academy. In 1933, Longaretti and his friend Gianluigi Uboldi embarked on a bicycle trip through Italy, starting in Milan and passing through Florence and Rome, to the east coast city of Pescara, then north along the east coast to Venice before returning to Milan. In 1934, they toured all of Sicily by bicycle.

He enrolled in the architecture program at the Polytechnic University of Milan and a fine arts program at Brera Academy in 1936, ultimately choosing to pursue the latter where he became a student of Aldo Carpi and his assistant Felice Filippini. He studied there until receiving his degree in 1939, during which time he was classmates with Arnaldo Badoli, Aldo Bergolli, Bruno Cassinari, Edmondo Dobrzanski, Ibrahim Kodra, Ennio Morlotti, and Italo Valenti. Some of his favourite professors included Carpi, sculptors Francesco Messina and Marino Marini, and painters Pompeo Borra and Mauro Reggiani. He said of Carpi that he was not just an art teacher, but a teacher of life, and that Carpi would correct the work of his students only infrequently, allowing them to develop a freedom in painting. Throughout his studies at Brera he continued to reside in Treviglio, to which he would return by train each day once he completed that day's classes.

Longaretti first exhibited his works in 1936 in a series of "Littoriali dell'Arte" exhibitions and at various artist collectives in Bergamo, Genoa and Milan. It was at this time that Afro, Badoli, Bergolli, Renato Birolli, Carpi, Cassinari, Cherchi, Alfredo Chighine, Grosso, Renato Guttuso, Dino Lanaro, Giuseppe Migneco, Mantica, Morlotti, Aligi Sassu, Ernesto Treccani, Valenti, and Emilio Vedova (and later Giuseppe Ajmone and Kodra) established a movement against the Novecento Italiano ("l'antinovecentismo") to pursue opportunities offered by Cubism, a movement they named Corrente. Longaretti did not participate in many of the foundational group discussions or late night gatherings at Milan cafés because he returned to Treviglio after classes, but he spent most of his days with this group (particularly Morlotti, Birolli, Guttuso, Sassu, and Vedova) which would work on "Picassian paintings". The artists also opposed the academic art style. The Corrente movement and its followers significantly distanced themselves from the "regime" of art.

Morlotti, who was from Bergamo, and Longaretti established a friendship that would continue until Morlotti's death in 1999. As a result of this friendship, Morlotti participated in the Premio Bergamo in 1941 and 1942. Years later, Morlotti stated that the two friendships he valued most were those with Romano Trojani and Longaretti, the latter with whom he had spent much time discussing the river Adda passing through their hometown. Longaretti referred to Morlotti as a dear friend.

In the famous 15 December 1939 editorial in the movement's magazine Corrente, the group reiterated its anti-fascist commitment in opposition to the National Fascist Party headed by Benito Mussolini by promoting an artist project about "all aspects of the reality in which we live in our time in history", which Longaretti fully embraced by portraying themes of humility.

== Career ==
Upon completion of his degree studies at Brera in early 1939, he was drafted by the Italian military for service in World War II. He was deployed to Slovenia, and later to Sicily and Albania, and when his tours of duty were complete, he would participate in art exhibitions. He continued to paint during his service, even when on the front lines, committing to canvas images of "dramatic testimonials" considered prohibited, such as Albanian villages razed by Italian troops. At the end of the war, he also began working on frescoes, glass art, and mosaic art. In 1942, he exhibited works at the Venice Biennale and at the Mostra degli artisti in armi ("Artists in arms") exhibit at the Palazzo delle Esposizioni in Rome, where he presented three watercolours and seven pen drawings, all having a war theme. By this time, he was a sergeant for the Genio Ferrovieri. His first personal exhibition occurred in 1943 and was presented by Raffaello Giolli at the Galleria La Rotonda in Bergamo. He dedicated himself to teaching and the creation of works of sacred art in 1945. He would exhibit at the Venice Biennale again in 1948, 1950, 1956, and 2011, and was invited to exhibit at the Rome Quadriennale in 1952.

When he married in 1945, his paintings were not selling, but his art diploma ensured him an income. In 1953 he won a national competition to become the director at the Accademia Carrara in Bergamo, becoming its Chair of Painting and succeeding Achille Funi for the position. He would be its director until 1978.

He resided and worked in both Bergamo in Lombardy and Cinque Terre in Liguria. He also owned a home in Framura, which he first visited in the 1970s. He maintained an "elegant studio" in the Città alta of Bergamo, which was jam-packed with paintings and books, and three in Corniglia, a frazione in the comune of Vernazza within Cinque Terre. He described Cinque Terre, which he first visited in the 1970s after discussions with residents in Framura, as one of the most beautiful places in the world, particularly its terraces, vineyards, and mountains. He considered it his adoptive home and returned there to paint when he needed tranquility, spending holidays and about four months a year there, as there was little tourism there to distract him. In 2002, he created two stained glass windows that he installed in the community's Church of San Pietro.

At the first studio he established in Corniglia, he tended the land and harvested fruit from the trees. He enjoyed walking along the terraces and through the countryside between his studios.

In 1964, he and other artists were invited to meet Pope Paul VI at the Sistine Chapel. In 2009, he was among the 500 artists in all fields (including painting, sculpture, cinema, theatre, dance, music, photography, and architecture) to receive an invitation from Gianfranco Ravasi, a cardinal and president of the Pontifical Council for Culture, to meet Pope Benedict XVI. The pope had requested the gathering to celebrate the 10th anniversary of the letter to artists written by Pope John Paul II in 1999 and to renew the relationship between the Catholic Church and artists.

Longaretti stated that a young artist should persist, because "if there is talent, it will surely emerge", but also believed that one is born an artist. For him, painting was an "elixir for long life" that he could not do without.

== Style ==
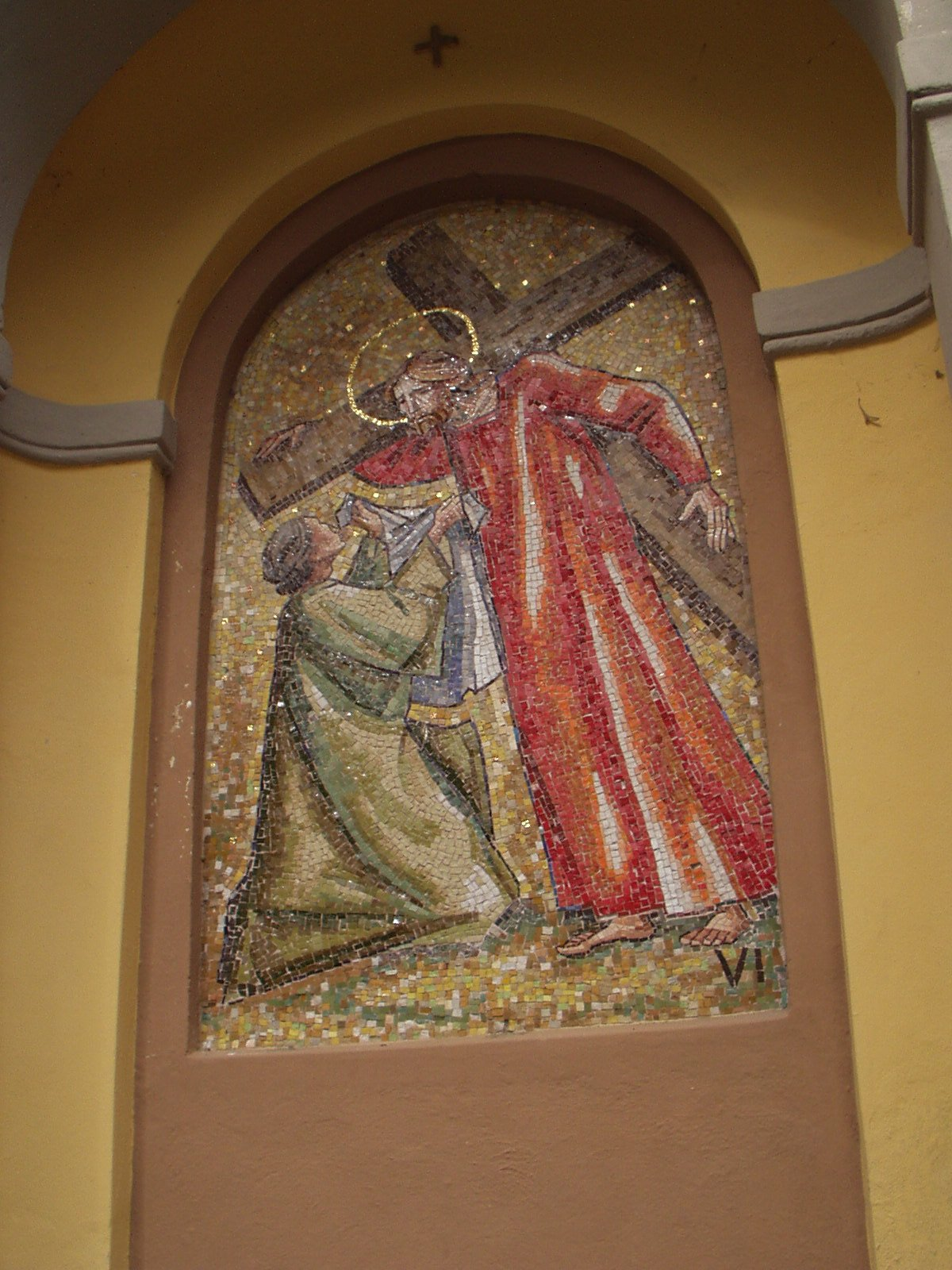
A mosaic of Saint Veronica wiping the face of Jesus, the sixth Station of the Cross, a work by Longaretti installed on the grounds of the Church of San Salvatore in Monasterolo del Castello

Longaretti stated that he preferred creating works that are "accessible and immediately enjoyable" by the public, and considered himself as "isolated in the panorama of Italian art". Unlike his friend Morlotti, Longaretti had a more reserved political and religious demeanour, which would also establish itself in the subjects he chose for his art. He was part of several movements, including Corrente and "Figurativismo Italiano", an Italian figurative art movement of the mid 1900s, the latter of which he is "an old master" according to journalist and art critic Giovanni Gazzeano. Sebastiano Grasso said the works Longaretti produced were in a range of styles between Corrente and expressionism echoing the styles of Gustav Klimt, Edvard Munch, Pablo Picasso, and Chaïm Soutine. Longaretti stated that his painting may have expressionist tendencies, but not with the connotation of tragedy common in the German school of expressionism.

His works include oil paintings and watercolours. His brushwork is described as like that of Cézanne, dense and oily and somewhat analytical. In an exhibition catalogue for the Pinacoteca civica di Follonica starting October 2007, curator Paola Artoni stated that Longaretti's "pictorial culture" has striking parallels to the works of Egon Schiele and even Vincent van Gogh. She also stated that in his "Humana Pictura" exhibition, the works in the collection have a distinctive "painted mosaic" style.

Common themes in his art are beggars and vagrants, which he uses as a symbol for human frailty, and mothers opposing violence, characters that could be mistaken for the Madonna. His opposition to violence and anti-war themes in his art were acquired during his military service. He stated that his art is "a denouncement and an invitation to no longer committing" the atrocious injustices of violence. By the 1970s, the mothers in his paintings exhibited a greater courage, and by the 1980s, they had a softer attitude. Longaretti stated that mothers are the same throughout the world – they suffer the consequences of war and the pursuit of glory, and once the destruction is complete, it is they who must rebuild.

Other themes include loneliness, abandonment, exile, pilgrimage, and poverty. Subjects often include wayfarers, runaways, actors, mimes, and musicians. He refers to the characters in his works as "figurines" who are hopeful, perhaps wounded and resigned, but never desperate.

The characters in his works often reflect the "freedom of expression" characteristic of the Corrente movement, and are seemingly frozen in motion. They are the "representation of taciturn labours and sufferings of existence" in search of a more dignified fate, and are often depicted in enchanted or fantasy settings conceptually similar to the style of Marc Chagall, a comparison with which Longaretti agreed. His watercolour portraits are nearly all of young subjects.

Longaretti also painted many still life portraits, described as "delicate and almost religious", symbolic of solitude and loneliness.

== Exhibitions ==
His works have been exhibited worldwide, including at London, New York City, Paris, Buenos Aires, Toronto, Ottawa, Amsterdam, Monaco, and Stockholm. They often feature themes of "solitude, pilgrimage, exile, poverty in the suburbs, [and] dignity".

To celebrate his 90th birthday, the town of Treviglio created an exhibition of his works, organized by the Cassa Rurale, a local bank. The exhibition was displayed throughout October 2006. A similar exhibition was also organized in Bergamo, and was displayed at Sala Manzù in October 2006.

=== Notable exhibitions ===
- 1943, Galleria La Rotonda, Bergamo, his first personal exhibition
- 1999, Casa del Mantegna, house built by Andrea Mantegna that is currently the official seat of the cultural department of the province of Mantova
- 1999, Palace of Nations, United Nations Headquarters in Geneva

On this occasion the card sent by the United Nations then High Commissioner for Human Rights, Dame Mary Robinson, to all Heads of States in the world, for the year 2000 greetings, used the reproduction of a Mother and Child painting by Longaretti.

- 2000, Allaman Castle, Allaman, Switzerland
- Humana Pictura, a travelling exhibition
- 2009, New York City, sponsored by the Italian Cultural Institute of New York

== Works ==
In 1944 Longaretti painted San Francesco libera le colombe ("Saint Francis liberates the doves") in the chapel of the Church of San Bernardino in Caravaggio, and donated the work to the city, which put it on indefinite display at the church. On the night of 27 March 1999, the painting and seven other works were stolen from the church by a Neopolitan man, who later sold them to an antique dealer from Abruzzo who was unaware of the theft. In 2008, the dealer requested Longaretti to appraise the painting, who reported the request to the police. The items were recovered and the Neapolitan man was charged after a three-month investigation.

Among his sacred art is the Stations of the Cross installed on the grounds of the Church of San Salvatore in Monasterolo del Castello. It consists of 14 mosaics framed within modern aedicula, designed by Longaretti in 1971 and realized by the Milan tile company Peresson, replacing the deteriorated artwork of Giovanni Brighenti. The mosaics and the base and walls of the tabernacles were restored by May 2011.

He also created a stained glass window for the hospital in his hometown.

=== Collections ===
Galleries that hold collections of his work include the Galleria d'Arte Moderna e Contemporanea and Pinacoteca Carrara in Bergamo, Galleria d'Arte Moderna and Museo della Permanente in Milan, and the Vatican Museums in Vatican City.

His sacred art is held in collections in churches, museums, and galleries throughout Italy and worldwide. His works are conserved or displayed at the Duomo di Milano, Duomo di Novara, the Vatican Museums, and the Basilica of Sant'Ambrogio and Galleria d'Arte Sacra Contemporanea in Milan.

He has donated works to the Accademia Carrara and to the Fondazione Credito Bergamasco operated by the bank Credito Bergamasco, which has hosted eight exhibitions dedicated to his works.

== Awards ==
Longaretti received the Mylius Award for his painting and the Stanga Award for his engraving in 1939 at the Academy of Brera.

In 2013 he received the "Madonna delle lacrime" award, an annual award presented by the city of Treviglio to honour individuals associated with the city who have distinguished themselves in volunteer, cultural, or sporting activities.

== Legacy ==
His works of mother and child, which he stated represent "one of the highest levels of love", have been criticized by feminists who state that the strong religious tones in his work and the desperation of the mothers in those works are "hostile to abortion laws". One of these works is used as the cover for "Un dottore per amico" ("A doctor for a friend"), a manual created by the Bergamo branch of the Italian Red Cross used to assist doctors to communicate with family of non-domestic sick children, and was distributed to all doctors, healthcare facilities, and schools in the region.

Longaretti created a mosaic in honour of his brother Carlo, who was president of Gruppo Alpini at the time of his disappearance, and installed it by 1981 at the Chiesetta della Madonna degli Alpini in Parco del Roccolo, which had been under renovation by Gruppo Alpini.

In 2006, he was one of 56 artists from Bergamo to donate works for an exhibition and auction in recognition of the International Year of Deserts and Desertification, to draw the public's attention to desertification, and to raise funds to build potable water wells in Malawian villages.

In 2007, five students who were the first graduates from the economics program at the University of Bergamo satellite campus in Treviglio received the Cartèla del Campanil (in Bergamasque dialect), a numbered print of a Longaretti work from the comune of Trevilgio, in addition to their diploma.

In 2009 the community of Valpiana held a feast for the Longaretti family, who have had an association with the community since 1909 and still own the original vacation home from that time. They were presented with the book Saluti dalla Valle Serina ("Greetings from Serina Valley") and a plaque by the mayor and deputy mayor, and other gifts from the community. The Longaretti family gave each family in the community a copper aquatint print by Trento Longaretti and a copy of the 1923 poem by cardinal Pietro La Fontaine about Serina. It was the second such feast, the first held in 1979 to commemorate the family's 70th year in the community.

In a 2013 interview with "Amici di Gabry" he stated that despite residing in Bergamo, he remains "trevigliese" (from Treviglio) as that is where his roots, family, and culture developed.

Longaretti turned 100 in September 2016 and died on 7 June 2017.
