= René Paresce =

Italian painter

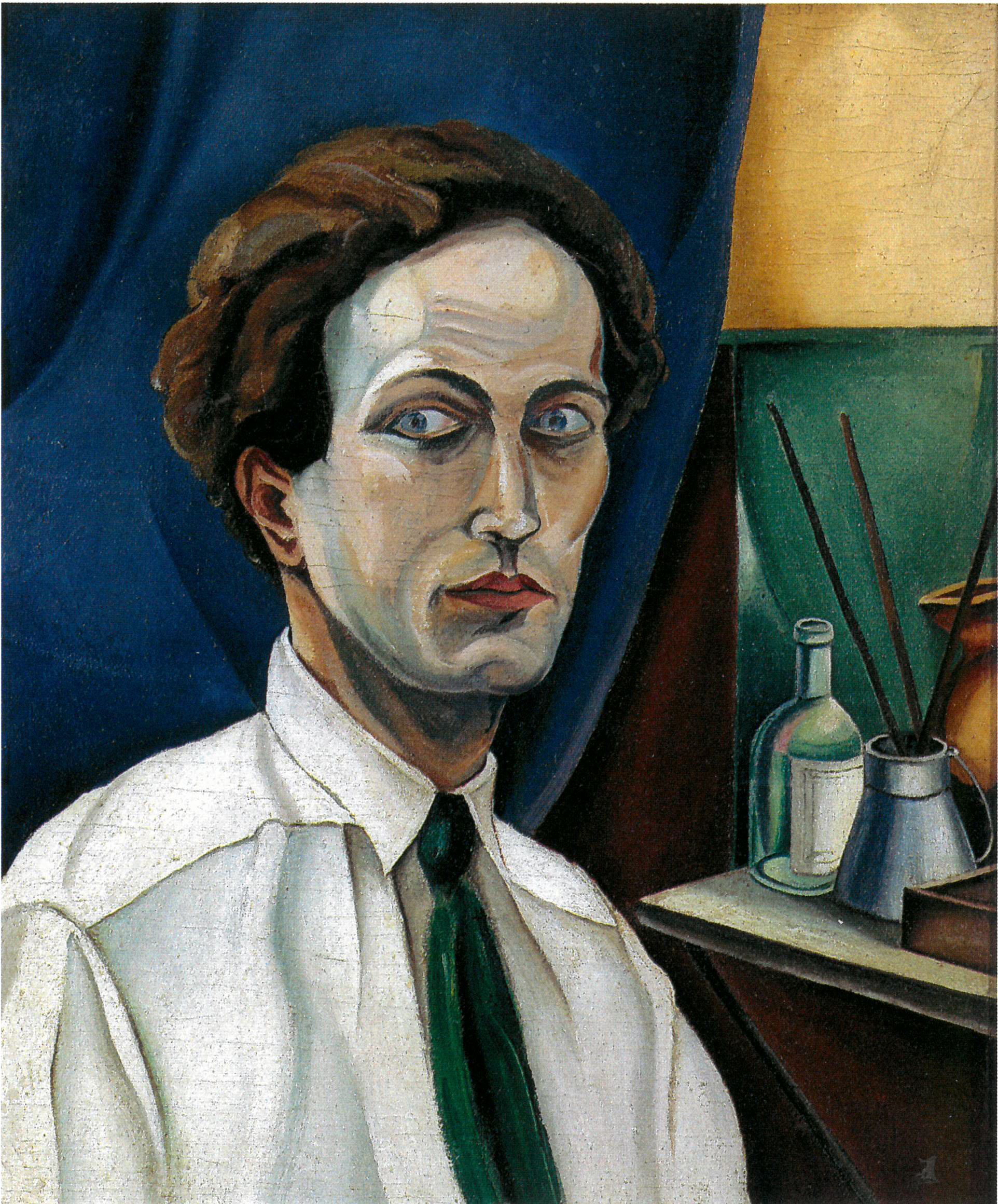
- Self-portrait (1917)
- Born: Renato Herbert Paresce; 5 January 1886; Carouge, Geneva, Switzerland
- Died: 15 October 1937 (aged 51); Paris, France
- Education: University of Bologna
- Known for: Painting; journalism

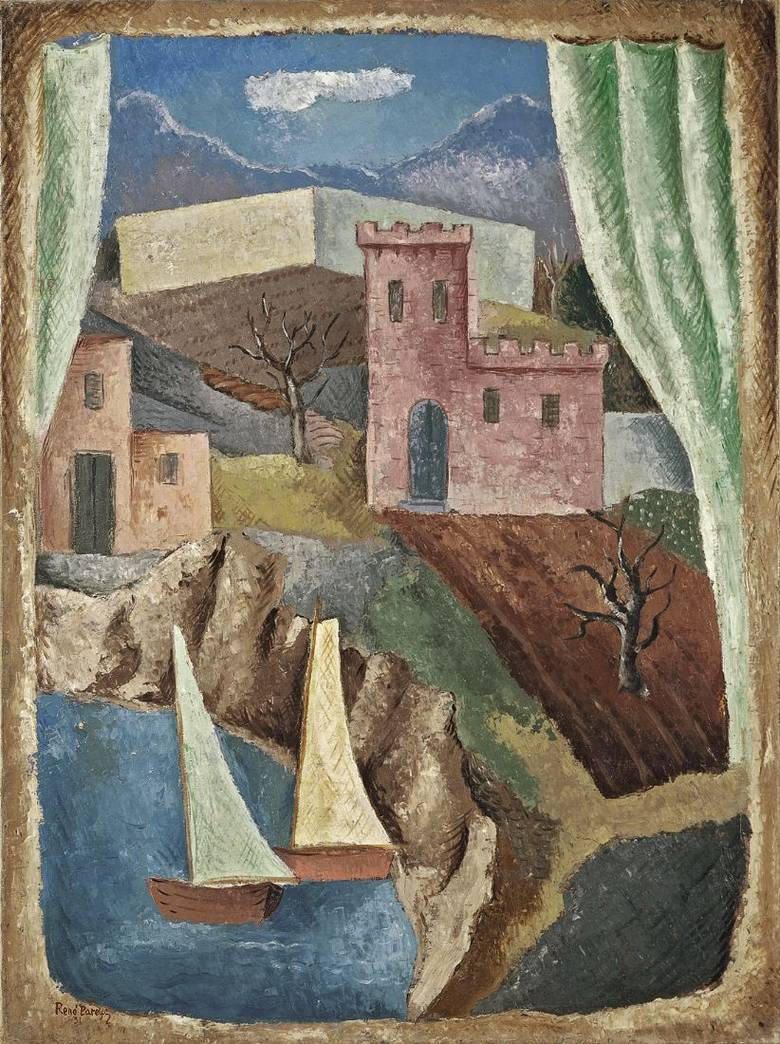
Il Castello (1931)

Renato Herbert Paresce (5 January 1886 – 15 October 1937), known professionally as René Paresce, was a Swiss-born Italian painter and journalist. Trained in physics, he worked in scientific research and later wrote as a foreign correspondent and art critic for Italian newspapers including Il Giornale d'Italia and La Stampa. In the 1920s and 1930s he exhibited with the Novecento Italiano (invited by Margherita Sarfatti) and was associated with the interwar Paris group known as the Italiens de Paris.

== Biography ==
Paresce was born in Carouge, a suburb of Geneva. His father was a militant socialist from Palermo, and his mother, Lidia Ignatieff, was the daughter of a Russian businessman. As a young man, he traveled to Paris. His parents travelled frequently, including to Moscow and Florence.

The family settled in Florence, where Paresce completed his secondary studies at the Istituto tecnico industriale "Leonardo da Vinci" in Florence. He then enrolled in the physics faculty at the University of Bologna, but after a year transferred to Palermo, where he graduated in 1911 with a thesis on the influence of electrons on the spectrum.

He declined a university assistant post in Palermo and returned to Florence, where he worked as a substitute teacher of natural sciences at the Barnabite collegio Alla Querce, while continuing to pursue painting as an autodidact. During this period he became friends with the Florentine painter Baccio Maria Bacci and translated Édouard Le Roy’s Science et philosophie into Italian. In Florence (1911–1912), he met the Russian-Jewish pianist Ella Klatchko (1880–1966) in the salon of Charles Loeser; they married in spring 1912.

In 1912, they moved to Paris, where Paresce frequented cafés such as the Dôme, La Rotonde and the Closerie des Lilas, and came into contact with Pablo Picasso, Sergei Diaghilev, Jacques Élie Faure, Paul Fort, Max Jacob, André Salmon, Diego Rivera and Amedeo Modigliani; Modigliani dedicated a pencil portrait to him in 1917..In Paris, Paresce served as a liaison to the culture of the École de Paris.

During World War I, he moved to London, renting his house in Sèvres to the Russian revolutionary Leon Trotsky, a family friend. In London he participated in marine research with the National Physical Laboratory. While there, he met Oskar Kokoschka. After the war, he traveled as a journalist to cover the Versailles conference, working for Il Giornale d'Italia and, later, La Stampa; signing his articles Renato. He soon was writing pieces about art criticism and painting to support his family. He remained in Paris until 1930.

In 1926, Margherita Sarfatti invited Paresce to exhibit in Milan with the painters of the Novecento Italiano. He continued to exhibit in Venice, Zürich, and Paris. In 1931, under the patronage of Waldemar-George, he was part of an exhibition of Italian painters at the Salon de l'Escalier in Paris, together with Giorgio de Chirico, Alberto Savinio, Mario Tozzi, Filippo de Pisis, Gino Severini, and Massimo Campigli, among others.

In 1933, Paresce had a personal exhibition hosted at the Galleria del Milione in Milan. In 1934, he took a voyage around the world, with a stop at Fiji, then crossed the United States; a trip he chronicled in a series of articles for La Stampa. In 1935, they were collected in a book titled L’altra America. After a long period when his interest in painting gradually declined, he died in Paris.
