= Achille Lega =

Italian painter

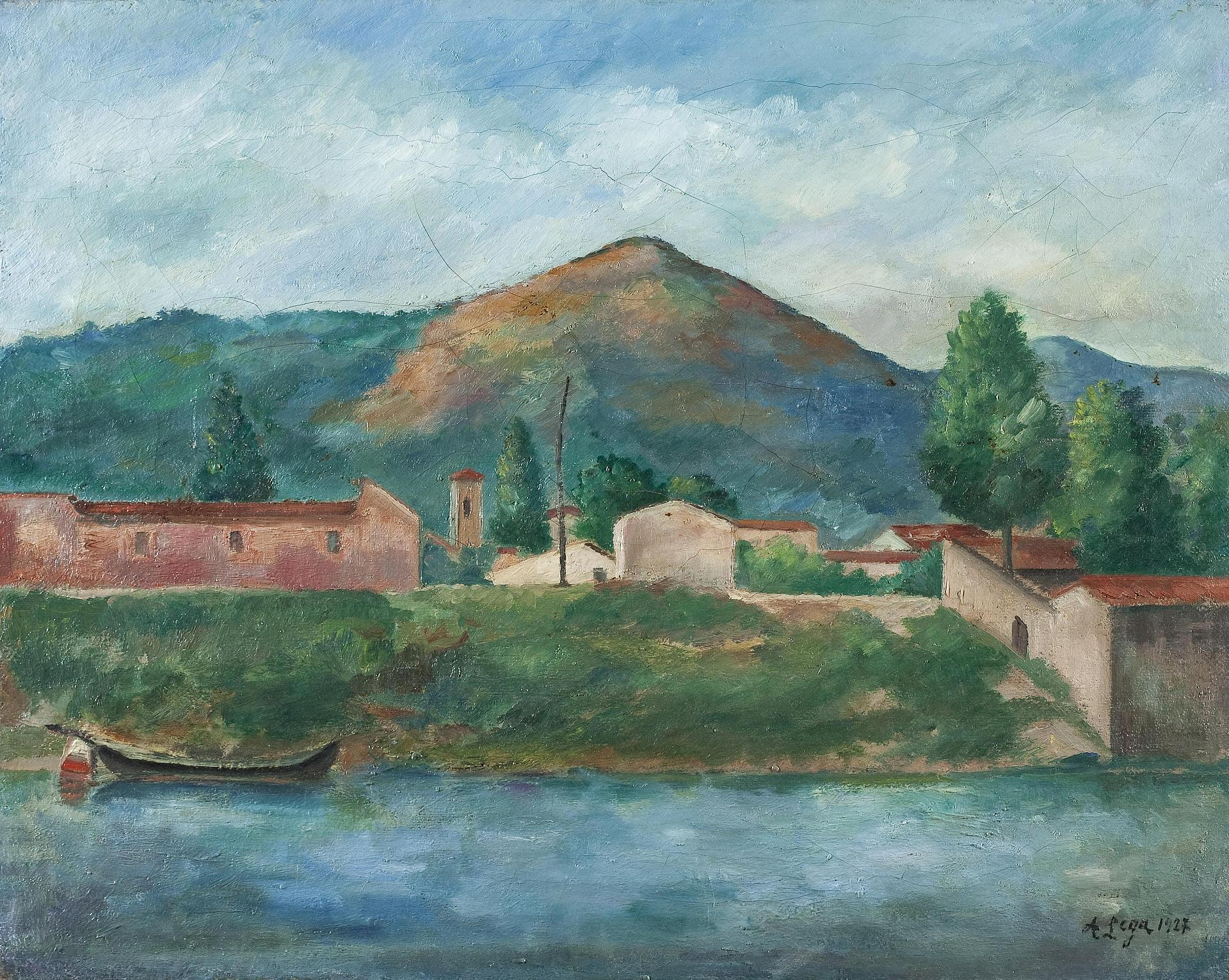
Arno, the Hermitage Museum

Achille Lega (21 April 1899 – 28 January 1934) was an Italian painter. His early work was in the futurist style and he later became a cubist.

Lega was born in Brisighella but lived in Florence from the age of ten. He first studied painting with Ludovico Tommasi, who belonged to the Postmacchiaioli movement. In 1914, he enrolled into the Academy of Fine Arts but abandoned the studies after two years. Lega's first notable painting, The Pier of Livorno, was produced in 1914 under the influence of Tommasi, however, it went well beyond emulating the style of Tommasi.

In July 1915, Lega was invited to participate in a collective art exhibition in Pistoia. In subsequent years, he was interested in such subjects as rural life, painting in a strongly simplified manner. In the 1910s, he was a regular customer of cafe Giubbe rosse in Florence, where, in particular, he met with futurists including Ardengo Soffici, Umberto Boccioni, and Filippo Tommaso Marinetti who influenced his art. He became friends with Ottone Rosai and remained close to Rosai until his death. Between 1916 and 1919, Lega was mainly under the influence of Soffici, following futurist trends but remaining within figurative art.

In 1918, Lega was drafted as a soldier and for a short time was posted in Carrara.

Starting from 1919, for several years he participated in yearly Grand Futurist Exhibitions organized by Marinetti in Milan. On 15 November 1922, Lega's first personal exhibition was opened in Florence. Between 1926 and 1933, Lega collaborated with the biweekly magazine Il Selvaggio, not only providing illustrations, but sometimes writing articles. Between 1926 and 1929 he exhibited in Milan with the Novecento Italiano art movement, which also included Mario Sironi, Achille Funi, and Gian Emilio Malerba. In this period, he also changed his style, preferring simplified geometrical forms. Between 1928 and 1934, Lega exhibited at the Biennale in Venice. He died in Florence on 28 January 1934.
