= Piero Marussig =

Italian painter

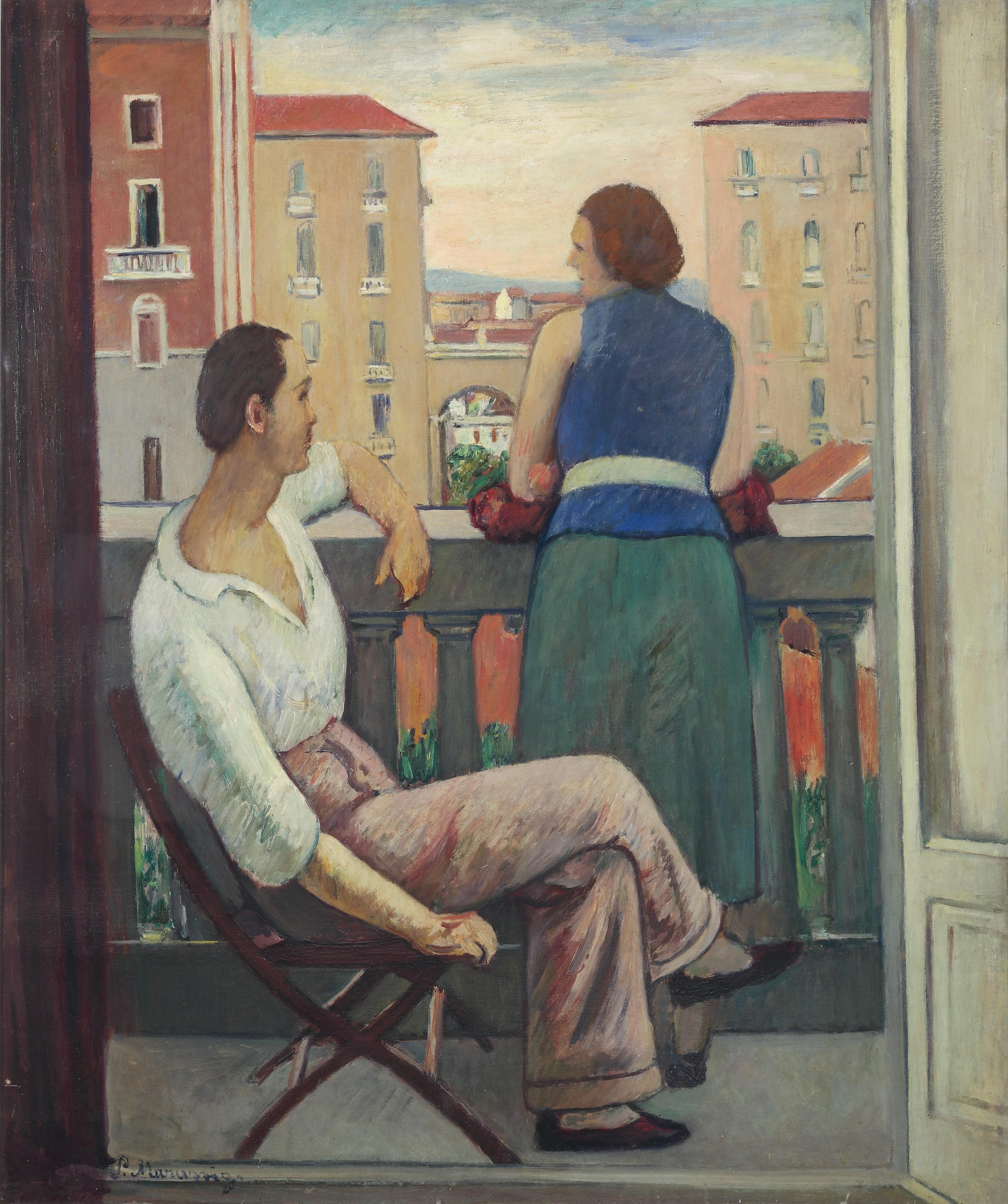
- Figures on the Balcony
- Born: 16 May 1879; Trieste, Austria-Hungary
- Died: 13 October 1937 (aged 58); Pavia, Kingdom of Italy
- Known for: Painting
- Movement: Novecento Italiano

Piero Marussig (16 May 1879 – 13 October 1937) was an Italian painter. He was one of the founders of the Novecento Italiano art movement.

== Biography ==
=== Early life ===
Piero Marussig was born in Trieste, Italy, the son of a wealthy businessman. He initially took lessons in his hometown from Eugenio Scomparini. In the early 1900s, he travelled to Germany and Austria, where he joined the Vienna Secession. He then lived in Rome for two years (1903–1905) and spent a year in Paris (1905), where he studied Post-Impressionism and Fauvism. Back in Italy, he lived in Trieste from 1906 until 1918. Marussig adopted a technique of outlining his figures with bold contours. He painted in a representative expressionist style, depicting genre scenes, vedute, and portraits. Works of this period, such as The Sisters (Milan, Galleria d'Arte Moderna), are imbued with melancholic overtones, produced by the combination of heavily impastoed brushwork, strong colours and subdued light.

=== Career ===
In 1919 Marussig had a one-man show at the Galleria Vinciana in Milan where he met Carlo Carrà and the art critic Margherita Sarfatti. He was a founder-member of the Novecento group (1922), with which he exhibited at the Venice Biennale of 1924. The movement included Anselmo Bucci, Leonardo Dudreville, Achille Funi, Gian Emilio Malerba, Ubaldo Oppi, and Mario Sironi. Later Marussig joined the steering committee of the reformulated Novecento Italiano and participated in its exhibitions of 1926 and 1929 in Milan. He also had numerous shows abroad. Despite this involvement, Marussig’s art never truly embraced the monumentality or archaicism of other members of the group such as Mario Sironi or Achille Funi. Art historian Rossana Bossaglia describes Marussig's "dry yet sweet" style and his preference for calm, composed images of traditional or domestic themes as characteristics that set him apart from his Novecento colleagues.

His work of the 1920s, such as The Bather (1925; Gallarate, priv. col.), shows an increased emphasis on space and volume, the use of earthy tones and a renewed interest in pictorial values. His repertory of intimate domestic scenes was extended in the 1930s to include a series of landscapes similar in atmosphere to the peaceful images of the Lombard countryside painted by Arturo Tosi, a close friend. In 1930, with Funi and the sculptor Timo Bortolotti, Marussig opened a studio in Milan based on Renaissance principles for training young artists.

== Selected paintings ==
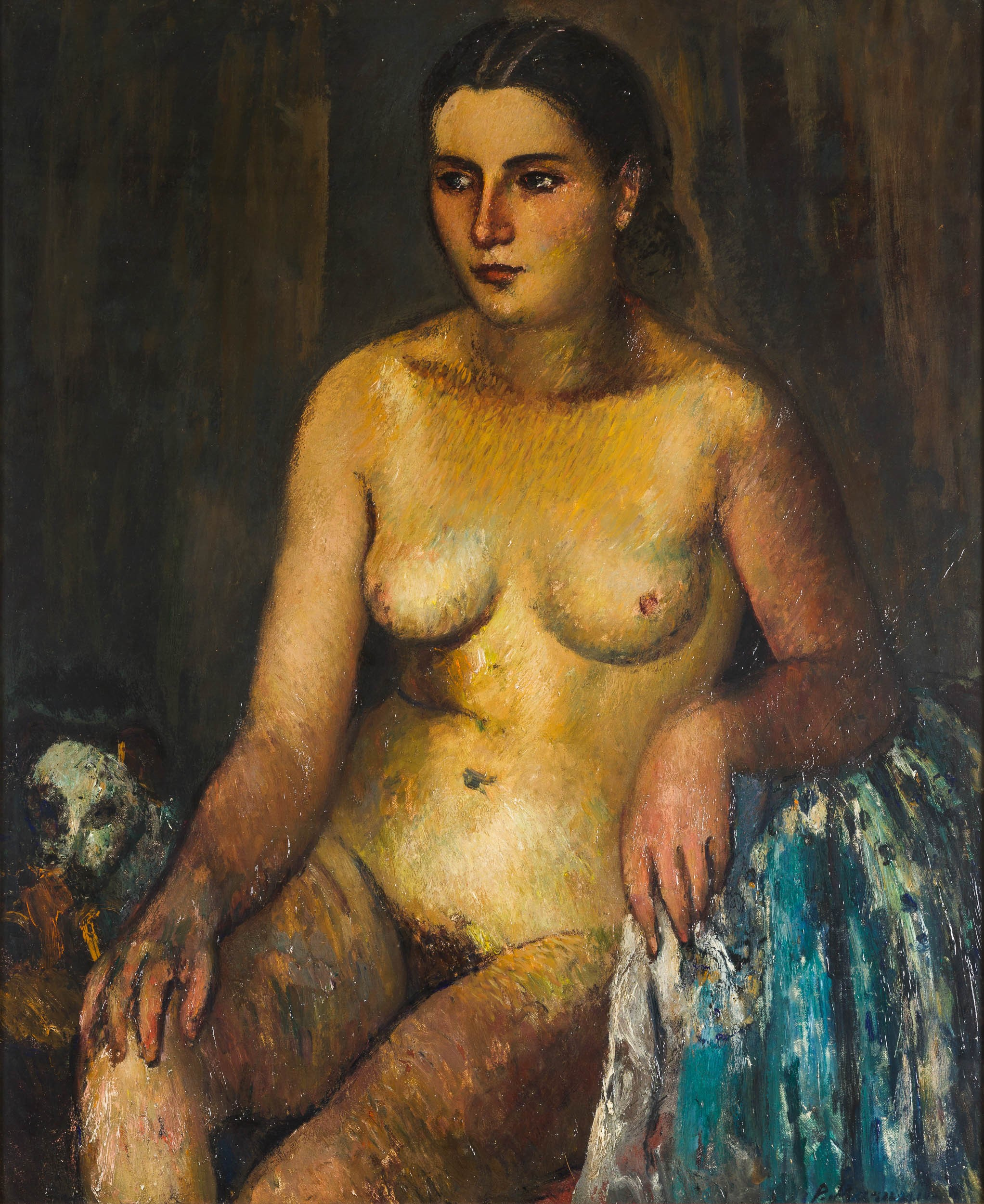
Nude

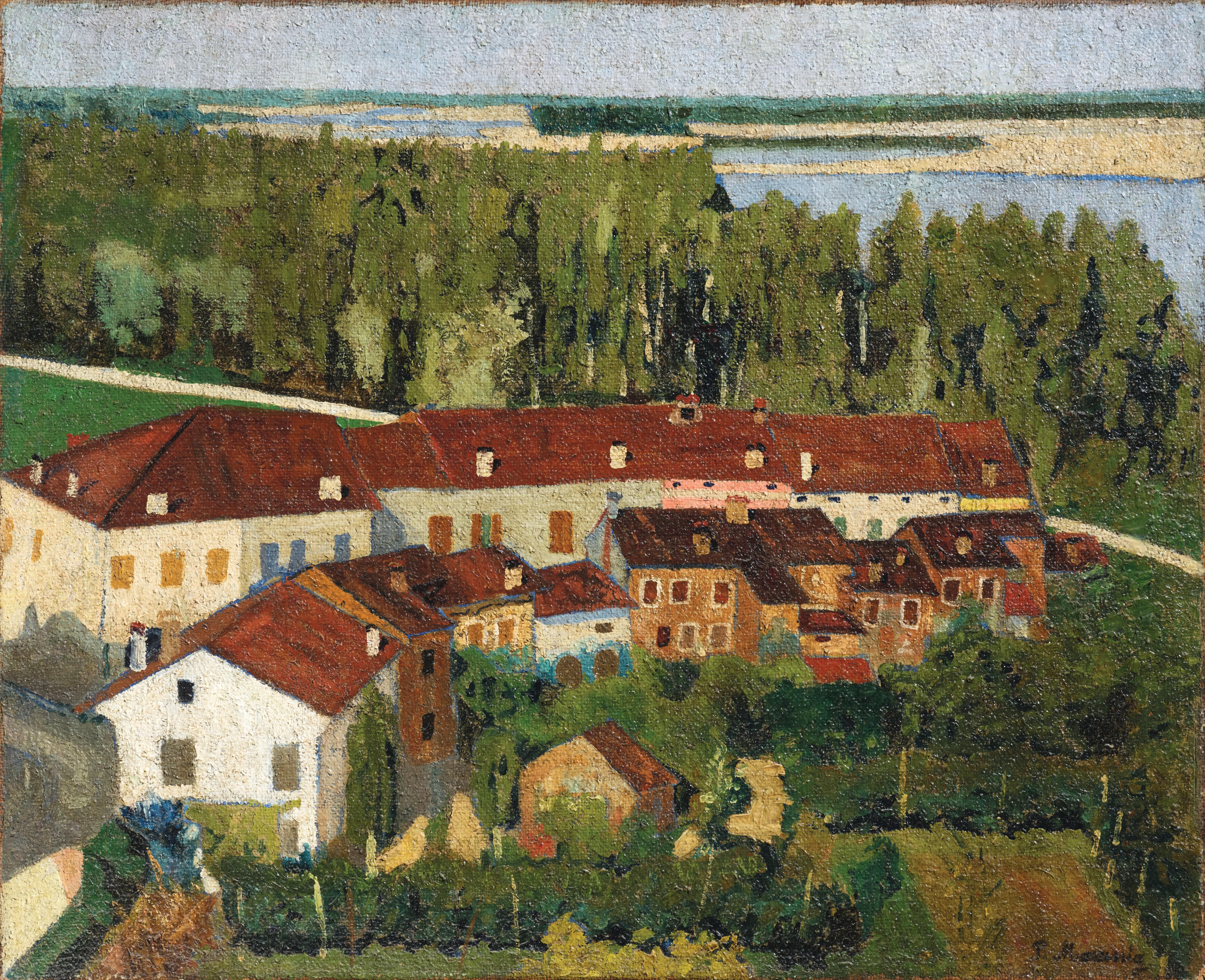
Landscape

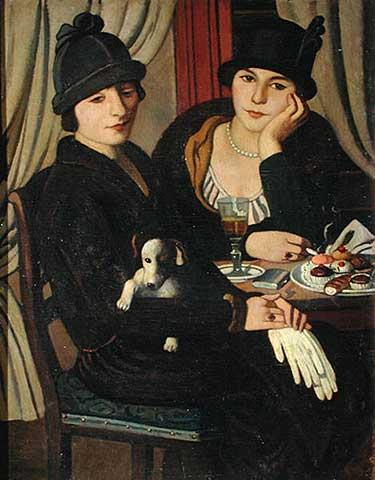
Women in a Cafe

Lady with fur

== Bibliography ==
- Bossaglia, Rossana (1979). Il novecento italiano: Storia, documenti, iconografia. Milan: Feltrinelli.
- Piero Marussig dalla provincia mitteleuropea al novecento italiano (exh. cat., ed. G. Mascherpa; Iseo, Pal. Arsenale, 1986).
- Canuti, Rossella (2008). "MARUSSIG, Piero". Dizionario Biografico degli Italiani (in Italian). Vol. 71: Marsilli–Massimino da Salerno. Rome: Istituto dell'Enciclopedia Italiana. ISBN 978-88-12-00032-6.
