= Ubaldo Oppi =

Italian painter

Ubaldo Oppi (29 July 1889 – 25 October 1942) was an Italian painter, one of the founders of the Novecento Italiano in Milan. He painted in a neo-quattrocento realist style.

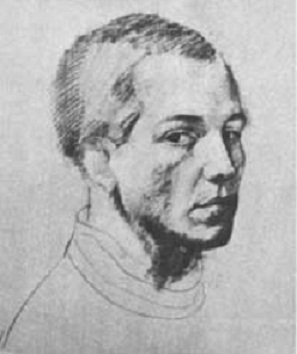
Portrait of Ubaldo Oppi

== Biography ==
He was born in Bologna, Italy, but by the age of 4 years, his father, a shoe salesman, had moved to Vicenza. He was sent by his father North to the German countries to learn the shoe trade, but elected to stay in Vienna (1907–1909), and study under Gustav Klimt. He returned to Italy, and was drafted into the military for a year, serving in the Adriatic coasts. He would then travel to Paris, where he frequented the modern artistic circles. There he had a brief affair with Fernande Olivier, who had been the mistress of Pablo Picasso, an acquaintance of Ubaldo.

In 1913, he exhibited at the Ca' Pesaro in Venice along with Casorati, Martini, and Gino Rossi. In 1915, he joins again the army; this time the alpine regiments. He fought in a number of battles, including the bloody Battle of Monte Pasubio. Late during World War I, he was captured and imprisoned at Mauthausen by the Austrians. After the war, he returned to Paris, exhibiting in the 'Salon des Indépendants of 1921. He exhibited at the 1924 Venice Biennale.

In 1922, along with Anselmo Bucci, Leonardo Dudreville, Achille Funi, Emilio Malerba, Piero Marussig, and Mario Sironi, he was one of the founders of the Novecento Italiano, patronized by Margherita Sarfatti and the incipient fascist party. But within a few years, he was to drop out of the group, not exhibiting together in the 1926 Venice Biennale. He won a second prize at the Mostra Mondiale of Pisburg in 1924. He exhibited frequently abroad, including Monaco, Dresden, and Vienna.

In the late 1920s, Oppi became more religious, and many of his later works included altarpieces. In 1926–1928, he frescoed the Chapel of San Francesco in the Basilica of St Anthony in Padua, and in 1932, for the church of Bolzano Vicentino.

He became a lieutenant colonel of the Alpine troops during World War II. He died in Vicenza.

== Gallery ==
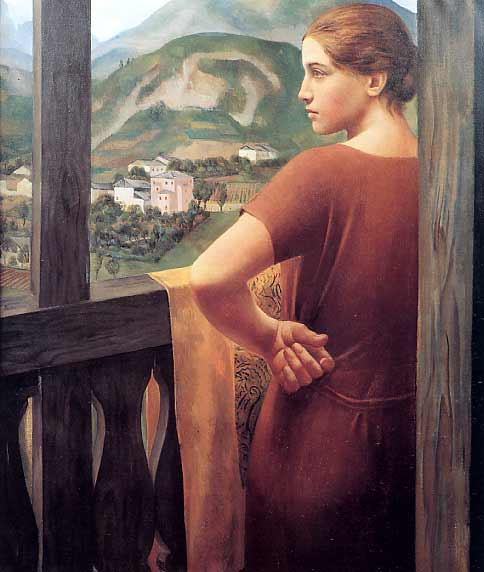
Woman at Window

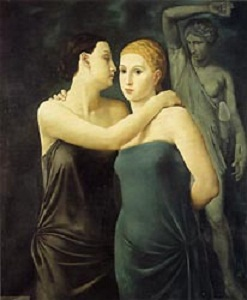
Women friends

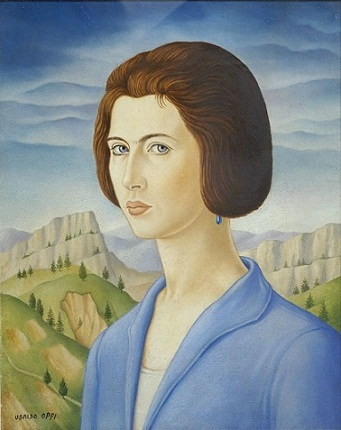
Volto di Dhely

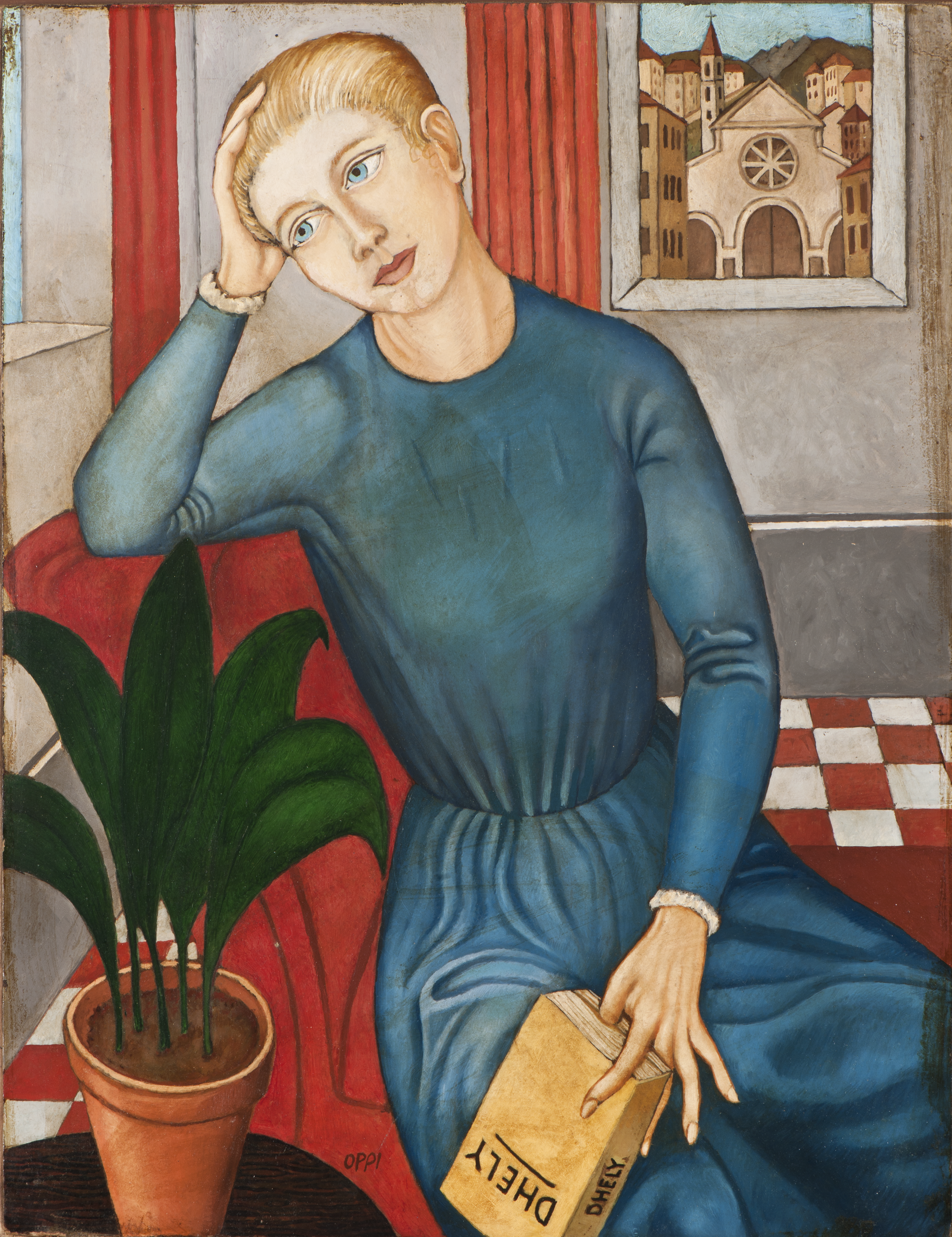
The sentimental girl
