= Novecento Italiano =

Italian artistic movement

Novecento Italiano (lit. 'Italian 1900s') was an Italian artistic movement founded in Milan in 1922 to create an art based on the rhetoric of the fascism of Mussolini.

== History ==
Novecento Italiano was founded by Anselmo Bucci (1887–1955), Leonardo Dudreville (1885–1975), Achille Funi, Gian Emilio Malerba (1880–1926), Pietro Marussig, Ubaldo Oppi, and Mario Sironi. Motivated by a post-war "call to order", they were brought together by Lino Pesaro, a gallery owner interested in modern art, and Margherita Sarfatti, a writer and art critic who worked on Italian dictator Benito Mussolini's newspaper, The People of Italy (Il Popolo d'Italia). Sarfatti was also Mussolini's mistress.

The movement was officially launched in 1923 at an exhibition in Milan, with Mussolini as one of the speakers. The group was represented at the Venice Biennale of 1924 in a gallery of its own, with the exception of Oppi, who exhibited in a separate gallery. Oppi's defection caused him to be ejected from the group, which subsequently split and was reformed. The new Novecento Italiano staged its first group exhibition in Milan in 1926.

Several of the artists were war veterans; Sarfatti had lost a son in the war. The group wished to take on the Italian establishment and create an art associated with the rhetoric of fascism. The artists supported the fascist regime and their work became associated with the state propaganda department, although Mussolini reprimanded Sarfatti for using his name and the name of fascism to promote Novecento.

The name of the movement (which means 1900s) was a deliberate reference to great periods of Italian art in the past, the Quattrocento and Cinquecento (1400s and 1500s). The group rejected European avant garde art and wished to revive the tradition of large format history painting in the classical manner. It lacked a precise artistic programme and included artists of different styles and temperament, for example, Carrà and Marini. It aimed to promote a renewed yet traditional Italian art. Sironi said, “if we look at the painters of the second half of the 19th century, we find that only the revolutionary were great and that the greatest were the most revolutionary”; the artists of Novecento Italiano “would not imitate the world created by God but would be inspired by it”.

Despite official patronage, Novecento art did not always have an easy ride in Fascist Italy. Mussolini was personally uninterested in art and divided official support among various groups so as to keep artists on the side of the regime. Opening the exhibition of Novecento art in 1923 he declared that “it is far from my idea to encourage anything like a state art. Art belongs to the domain of the individual. The state has only one duty: not to undermine art, to provide humane conditions for artists, to encourage them from the artistic and national point of view." The movement was in competition with other pro-Fascist movements, especially Futurism and the regionalist Strapaese movement. Novecento Italiano also met outright opposition. Achille Starace, the General Secretary of the Fascist Party, attacked it in the Fascist daily press and there was virulent criticism of its “un-Italian" qualities by artists and critics.

In the 1930s, a group of professors and students at the Accademia di Brera established an opposition group to Novecento Italiano. Among them was the director of the academy Aldo Carpi, and students Afro, Aldo Badoli, Aldo Bergolli, Renato Birolli, Bruno Cassinari, Cherchi, Alfredo Chighine, Grosso, Renato Guttuso, Dino Lanaro, Giuseppe Migneco, Mantica, Ennio Morlotti, Aligi Sassu, Ernesto Treccani, Italo Valenti, and Emilio Vedova (and later Giuseppe Ajmone and Ibrahim Kodra), with participation from Trento Longaretti, who was not involved in the foundational discussions because he returned to his hometown Treviglio by train after classes. This movement became known as Corrente, which also published a magazine by that name. By 1939, a famous editorial in the magazine stated the group's opposition to fascism, Novecento Italiano, and Futurism.

The unity of the group depended much on Sarfatti and it weakened in her absence from Milan. When she was distanced from Mussolini, in part due to the anti-Semitic ordinances of 1938, the group fell apart and was formally disbanded in 1943.

== Artists of the Novecento ==
- Giacomo Balla
- Baccio Maria Bacci
- Anselmo Bucci
- Pompeo Borra
- Aldo Carpi
- Carlo Carrà
- Felice Casorati
- Giorgio de Chirico
- Raffaele De Grada
- Fortunato Depero
- Antonio Donghi
- Ercole Drei
- Leonardo Dudreville
- Achille Funi
- Virgilio Guidi
- Achille Lega
- Gian Emilio Malerba
- Arturo Martini
- Pietro Marussig
- Francesco Messina
- Giorgio Morandi
- Ubaldo Oppi
- Renato Paresce
- Siro Penagini
- Gio Ponti
- Gino Severini
- Mario Sironi
- Mario Tozzi
- Francesco Trombadori
- Adolfo Wildt

== See also ==
- Corrente di Vita
- Valori plastici
- Return to order
- Scuola Romana
- History of architecture and art in Milan
