= Massimo Campigli =

Italian painter, journalist (1895–1971)

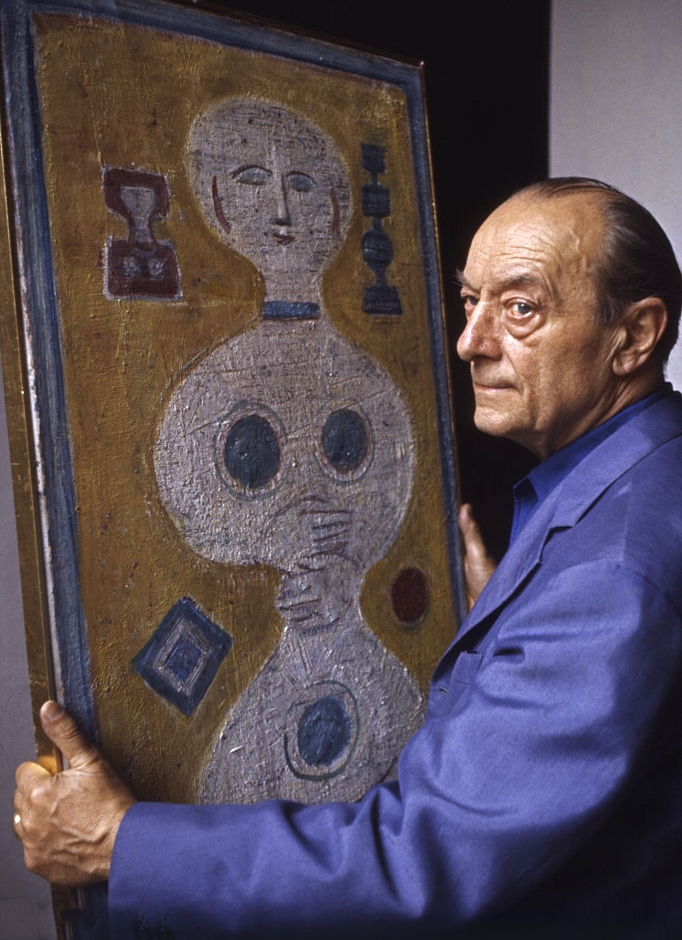
- Campigli in 1967
- Born: Max Ihlenfeld; 4 July 1895; Berlin, Germany
- Died: 31 May 1971 (aged 75); Saint-Tropez, France
- Known for: Painting
- Spouse(s): Magdalena Rădulescu (m. 1927–1939; div.), Giuditta Scalini (m.)

Massimo Campigli (Italian: [ˈmassimo kamˈpiʎʎi]; born Max Ihlenfeld, 4 July 1895 – 31 May 1971) was an Italian painter and journalist.

== Biography ==
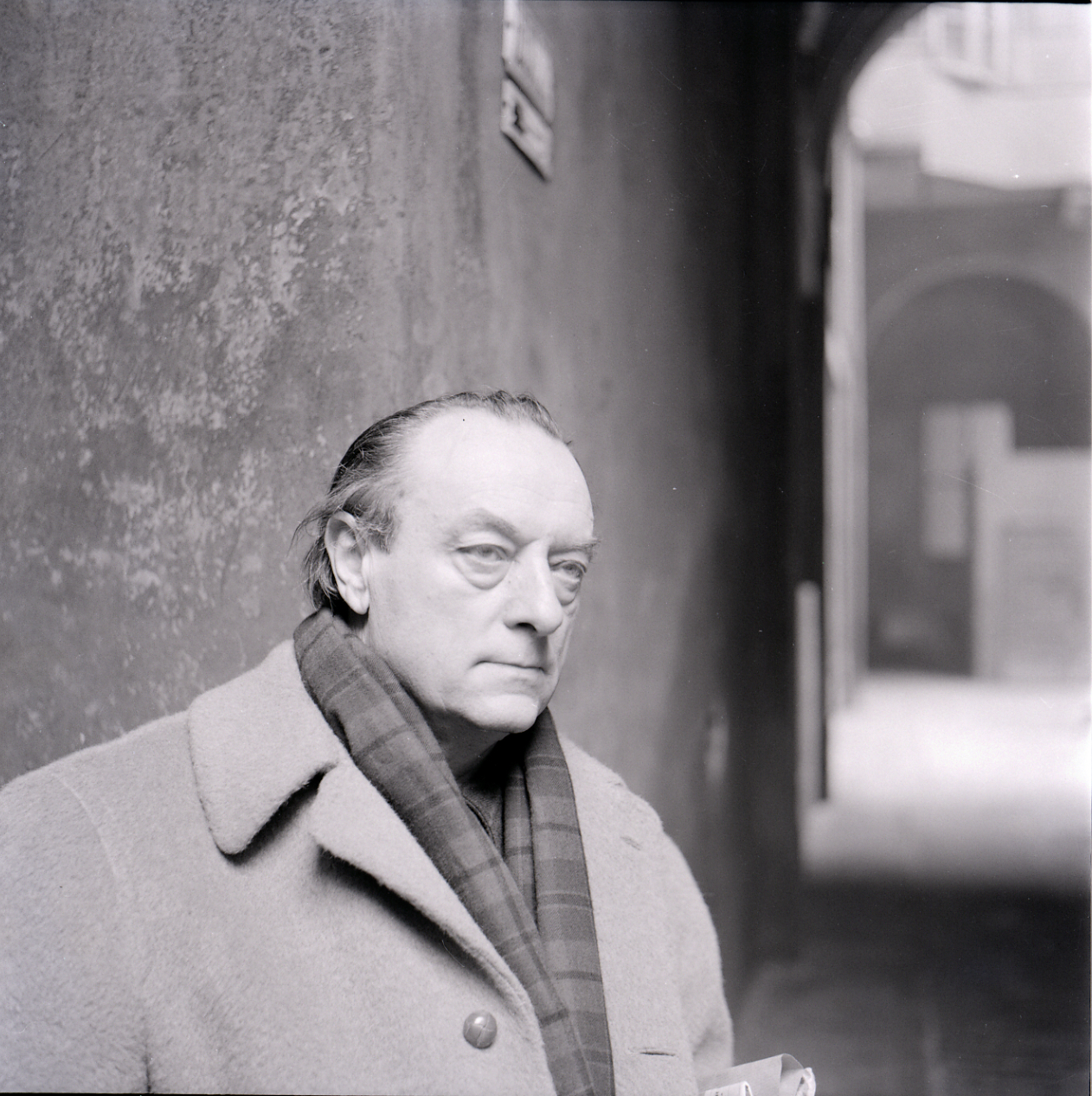
Massimo Campigli, photo by Paolo Monti

He was born in Berlin, Germany, but spent most of his childhood in Florence, Italy. His family moved to Milan in 1909, and here he worked on the Letteratura magazine, frequenting avant-garde circles and making the acquaintance of Boccioni and Carrà. In 1914 the Futurist magazine Lacerba published his "Giornale + Strada – Parole in libertà" ("Journal + Road – Words in freedom"). During World War I Campigli was captured and deported to Hungary where he remained a prisoner of war from 1916 to 1918.

At the end of the war he moved to Paris where he worked as foreign correspondent for the Milanese daily newspaper Corriere della Sera. Although he had already produced some drawings during the war, it was only after he arrived in Paris that he started to paint. At the Café du Dôme he consorted with artists including Giorgio de Chirico, Alberto Savinio, Gino Severini and Filippo De Pisis. Extended visits to the Louvre deepened Campigli's interest in ancient Egyptian art, which became a lasting source of his own painting.

His first figurative works applied geometrical designs to the human figure, reflecting the influence of Pablo Picasso and Fernand Léger as well as the Purism of "L'Esprit Nouveau".

In 1923, he organised his first personal exhibition at the Bragaglia Gallery in Rome. During the next five years his figures developed a monumental quality, often with stylised poses and the limbs interwoven into a sculptural solidity. The importance given to order and tradition, the atmosphere of serenity and eternity were in line with the post-war reconstruction and the programme of the "Twentieth Century" artists with whom Campigli frequently exhibited both in Milan from 1926–29 and abroad from 1927 to 1931.

As from 1926, he joined the "Paris Italians" together with de Chirico, de Pisis, Renato Paresce, Savinio, Severini and Mario Tozzi. In 1928, year of his debut at the Venice Biennale, he was very much taken by the Etruscan collection when visiting the National Etruscan Museum in Rome. He then broke away from the compact severity of his previous works in favour of a plane with subdued tones and schematic forms rich in archaisms.

While in Paris Campigli worked at Atelier 17.

During a journey in Romania with his first wife, painter Magdalena Rădulescu, he started a new cycle of works portraying women employed in domestic tasks and agricultural labour. These figures were arranged in asymmetrical and hieratic compositions, hovering on a rough textured plane, inspired by ancient fresco. These works were enthusiastically received by the critics at the exhibition held in the Jeanne Bucher gallery, Paris, in 1929 and at the Milione Gallery, Milan, in 1931. During the thirties he held a series of solo exhibitions in New York, Paris and Milan which brought him international acclaim.

In 1933 Campigli returned to Milan where he worked on projects of vast dimensions. In the same year he signed Mario Sironi's Mural Art Manifesto and painted a fresco of mothers, country-women, working women, for the V Milan Triennial, which was later destroyed. In the following ten years other works were commissioned: I costruttori ("The builders") for the Geneva League of Nations in 1937; Non uccidere ("Do not kill") for the Milan Courts of Justice in 1938, an enormous 300 square metre fresco for the entrance hall, designed by Gio Ponti, of the Liviano, Padua which he painted during 1939–40.

After divorcing in 1939, Campigli remarried with the sculptor Giuditta Scalini. Together they passed the war years in Milan and in Venice, then after the war they divided their time between Rome, Paris and Saint-Tropez. In 1943, his son Nicola was born in Venice.

In a personal exhibition at the Venice Biennial in 1948 he displayed his new compositions: female figures inserted in complicated architectonic structures. During the 60s his figures were reduced to coloured markings in a group of almost abstract canvasses. In 1967 a retrospective exhibition was dedicated to Campigli at the Palazzo Reale in Milan. He died of a heart attack in 1971 in Saint-Tropez.
