= Mario Tozzi =

Italian painter

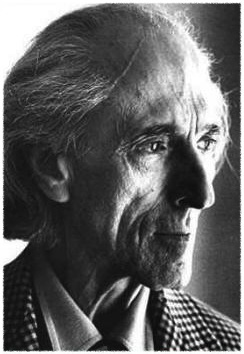
- Born: 30 October 1895; Fossombrone, Italy
- Died: 8 September 1979 (aged 83); Saint-Jean-du-Gard, France
- Known for: Painting

Mario Tozzi (30 October 1895 – 8 September 1979) was an Italian painter. He was awarded the Legion of Honour by the French government.

== Biography ==
Tozzi studied at the Accademia di Belle Arti di Bologna in Italy where he met Giorgio Morandi and Osvaldo Licini. He graduated in 1916.

After the First World War, he moved to Paris, France and founded the Groupe des Sept (also known as Les Italiens de Paris) with Massimo Campigli, Giorgio de Chirico, Filippo De Pisis, Renato Paresce, Alberto Savinio and Gino Severini.

Tozzi returned to Rome in 1936. His work was exhibited at the Venice Biennale in 1938, 1942, 1948, 1952 and 1954.

He returned to France in 1971, dying there in 1979.

A catalogue raisonné of his paintings was published In 1988 by Giorgio Mondadori Editore and edited by Marilena Pasquali.

== Public collections ==
- Centre Georges Pompidou, Paris, France
- Museum of Fine Arts of Lyon, Lyon, France
- Museum of Fine Arts Bern, Bern, Switzerland
- Pushkin Museum, Moscow, Russia
- Museo del Novecento, Milan, Italy
- Bologna Museum of Modern Art, Bologna, Italy
- Galleria Nazionale d'Arte Moderna, Rome, Italy
