= Achille Funi =

Italian painter

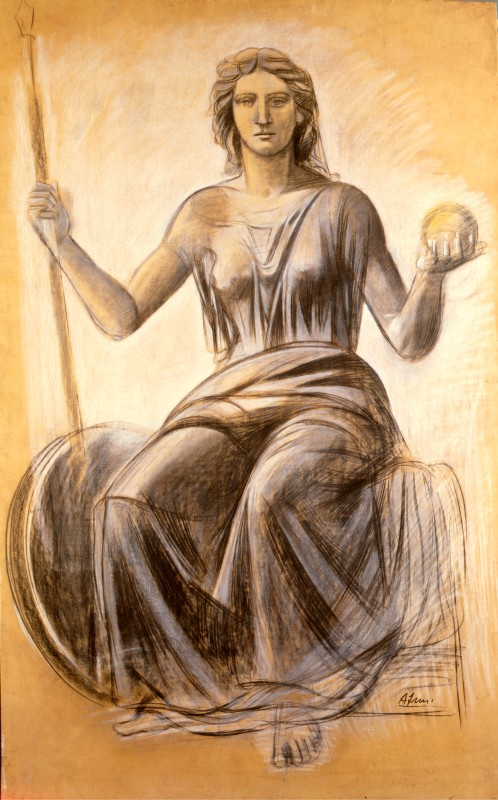
Dea Roma (studio), 1941–1942 (Fondazione Cariplo)

Achille Funi (26 February 1890 – 26 July 1972) was an Italian painter who painted in a Modernist take on the Neoclassical style.

== Biography ==
Funi was born in Ferrara, Italy. He studied at the Brera Academy of Fine Arts from 1906 to 1910 and joined the Nuove Tendenze movement as a painter of Cubo-Futurist works in 1914. Having enlisted in the Volunteer Cyclist Battalion and served in World War I, he became a champion of the return to order. He studied Graeco-Roman statuary and was influenced by de Chirico's Metaphysical painting. His Autoritratto da giovane ("Self-portrait as a Young Man"; 1924) is in the Museo Cantonale d’Arte in Lugano.

In 1920, Funi met the journalist and art patron Margherita Sarfatti, who took an interest in him as one of a group of artists whose work she believed represented modern Italy. He participated in an exhibition Sarfatti presented in 1923 entitled Sette Pittori del Novecento ("Seven Painters of the Twentieth Century"), which included Funi, Anselmo Bucci, Leonardo Dudreville, Gian Emilio Malerba, Piero Marussig, Ubaldo Oppi, and Mario Sironi. Funi became one of the leaders of Novecento Italiano, taking part in the movement's first and second exhibitions (Milan, 1926 and 1929). The author of numerous frescoes in the 1930s, he was a signatory of the Manifesto della Pittura Murale together with Mario Sironi in 1933 and became one of the artists most esteemed by the Fascist regime, obtaining a teaching post at the Brera Academy in 1939. The period after World War II saw the continuation of decorative works for public and religious buildings in Milan and a parallel focus on landscapes. He died in Appiano Gentile on 26 July 1972.

== Works ==
- Portrait of his sister Margaret, 1913
- Window, 1915
- Self-Portrait, 1920
- Earth, 1921
- Maternity, 1921
- Self-portrait as a young man, 1924
- The myth of Ferrara, dining dell'Arengo Municipal Palace of Ferrara, 1934–1937.

== Public collections ==
- Gallery Guggenheim in Venice
- Museum of Modern and Contemporary Art Filippo de Pisis Ferrara
- Pinacoteca Leonidas and Albertina Repaci Palmi

== Other projects ==
Media related to Achille Funi at Wikimedia Commons
