= Dino Lanaro =

Italian painter (1909–1998)

Dino Lanaro (1909 - 1998) was an Italian painter of the Corrente de Vita movement started in Milan as a counterpoint to nationalistic Futurism and the Novecento Italiano movements. He often painted bright landscapes with houses.

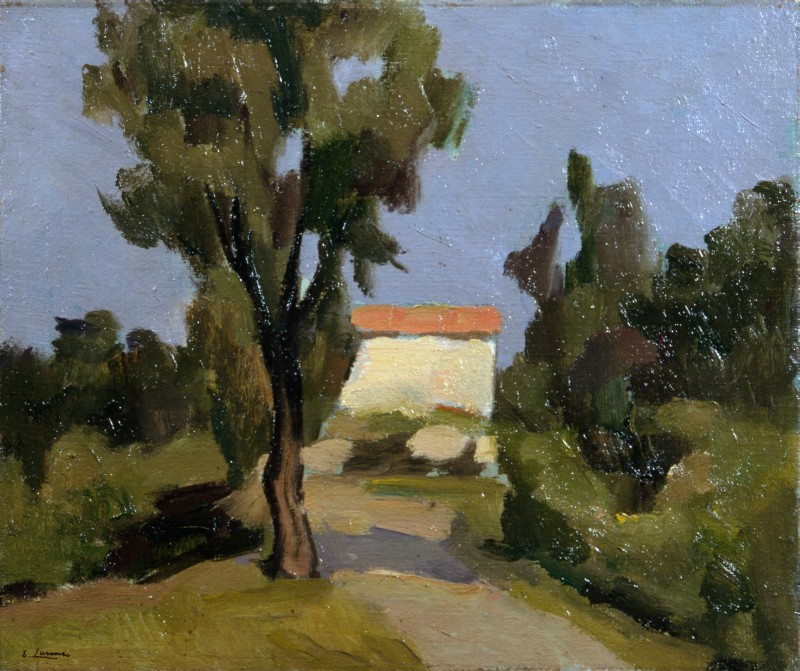
Landscape, Fondazione Cariplo

== Biography ==
Dino was born in Malo in the province of Vicenza. By the age of 15, he had to work adding tint and color to prints for a publishing house, where he learned typography and lithography. He briefly served in the army during the first world war, but moved to Padua where he met other artists. In 1931, he exhibited that year with Antonio Morato, Dino Lazzaro, and Luigi Strazzabosco at the Mostra Internazionale di Arte Sacra in Padua. In 1937, he moved to Milan, where he would join the Corrente Movement, befriending Renato Birolli, and exhibiting with the group at the Galleria on Via Spiga.

After the war, he participated in the Venice Biennale of 1948, 1950, and 1956; and at the Quadriennali of Rome in 1947, 1951, 1959, and 1965. In Milan, he was nominated as an instructor of painting for the Brera Academy. In 1971, he visited Minnesota for an exhibition. Some of his works are exhibited at the Galleria d’Arte moderna (GAM) di Milano and in the Museums of La Spezia, Gallarate, Alessandria, Museo Castelvecchio a Verona, and Castello del Buonconsiglio di Trento. In 1984, a retrospective was held in Schio of his works.

He died in Milan.
