= Margherita Sarfatti =

Italian writer, journalist and art critic

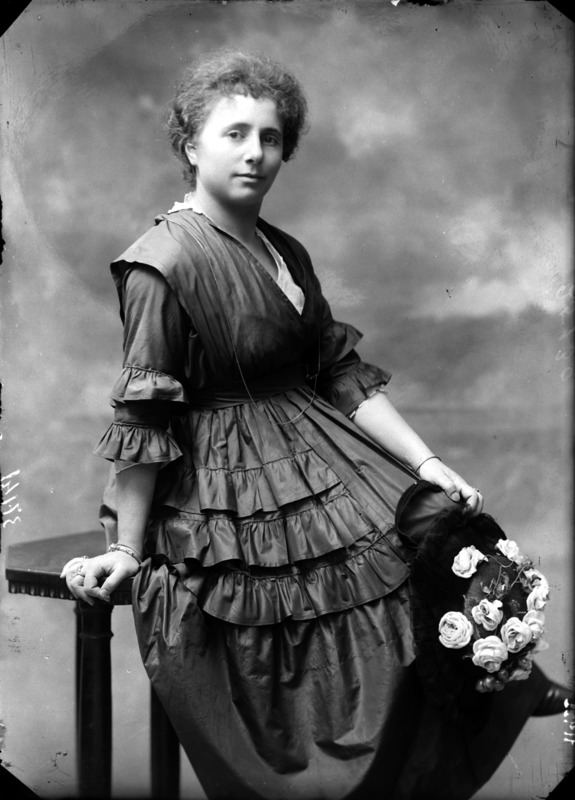
- Born: Margherita Grassini; 8 April 1880; Venice, Kingdom of Italy
- Died: 30 October 1961 (aged 81); Cavallasca, Italy
- Occupations: Author; journalist; art critic
- Known for: Biographer and mistress of Benito Mussolini
- Notable work: The Life of Benito Mussolini (1925)
- Political party: National Fascist Party
- Spouse: Cesare Sarfatti (m. 1898; died 1924)
- Partner: Benito Mussolini (1911–1931)
- Children: 3
- Relatives: Giuseppe Levi (first cousin once removed); Natalia Ginzburg (second cousin); Carlo Ginzburg (second cousin once removed); Lisa Ginzburg (third cousin)

Margherita Sarfatti (Italian pronunciation: [marɡeˈriːta sarˈfatti]; née Grassini; 8 April 1880 – 30 October 1961) was an Italian journalist, art critic, patron, collector, socialite, and prominent propaganda adviser of the National Fascist Party. She was Benito Mussolini's biographer as well as one of his mistresses.

== Biography ==
Margherita Grassini was born in Venice to a Jewish family, the daughter of Amedeo Grassini and Emma Levi (whose cousin Giuseppe Levi was the father of Natalia Ginzburg). Amedeo was a wealthy lawyer and businessman and a former fiscal attorney for the Venetian government. He was a close friend of Giuseppe Melchiorre Sarto, later Pope Pius X, and would later be made a Knight of the Order of the Crown of Italy.

Margherita grew up in a palazzo situated at the Canal Grande in Venice and was educated by private tutors. However, she was soon attracted by socialist ideas and escaped her parents' home at age 18 to marry Cesare Sarfatti, a Jewish lawyer from Padua. He was 13 years her senior but shared her socialist beliefs. In 1902, the couple moved to Milan. There, they became prominent in the city's artistic life, hosting weekly Salons that became the centre of the Futurist and Novecento Italiano artistic movements. The Salons took place at the number 93 of Corso Venezia. Present at these gatherings were Mussolini, Massimo Bontempelli, Ada Negri, and the sculptors Medardo Rosso and Arturo Martini. Margherita Sarfatti and her husband had several children. Their eldest son, Robert, enlisted in the Italian army during World War I, and was killed in action on Monte Baldo in January 1918, aged 18.

Personal friend and private collector of the right-wing avanguardist Umberto Boccioni, in 1911 Sarfatti met Benito Mussolini (three years her junior) and started a relationship with him. During this time she was working as an art critic at the socialist newspaper Avanti!, which at the time was directed by Mussolini. After her husband died in 1924, she wrote a biography of Mussolini. This was first published in 1925 in Britain under the title The Life of Benito Mussolini; it was published the following year in Italy with the title Dux. Because of the fame of Mussolini and the author's familiarity with the dictator, the book was a success. Seventeen editions were printed and it was translated into 18 languages. Although discreet (and non-exclusive), the relationship between Sarfatti and Mussolini continued into the 1930s, with secret meetings at Palazzo Venezia, on more than one occasion arousing the jealousy of Rachele Mussolini.

Sarfatti is memorialized in Guido Cadorin frescoes in what is now the Grand Hotel Palace, Via Veneto No. 70, Rome. "Fiammetta and I wanted to pass into immortality in the salon's frescoes," she remarked, referring to her daughter, who is portrayed with her in the frescoes.

Sarfatti had an influence over Mussolini's policies from 1922 until 1938, when Mussolini bowed to German pressure and enacted racial legislation through the Manifesto of Race; until then, the fascist government's politics were not antisemitic, and the party's membership rolls were open to Jews. From 1927 she contributed to the Heidelberg-based magazine Italien which had been established with the support of Mussolini. In 1922, the group Novecento was enlarged to Anselmo Bucci, Leonardo Dudreville, Achille Funi, Gian Emilio Malerba, Pietro Marussig, Ubaldo Oppi, and Mario Sironi. Sarfatti had contacts with many Italian Freemasons, who were disliked but tolerated by Mussolini as long as they were useful to him.

By 1930 Sarfatti converted to Catholicism, and noted that Mussolini was cheating on her with younger women, and expelled her from whatever influence she had. By 1938, with the application of racial laws, she left Italy, first to Switzerland, and then alone for Argentina and Uruguay. She took with her the 1,272 letters from Mussolini. She worked as a journalist for the newspaper El Diario of Montevideo. She began her memoirs, which were published in full only in 2026. After the war, in 1947, Sarfatti returned to her home country and once again became an influential force in Italian art. Her children who had remained in Italy survived the war, but her sister with her husband were deported by the fascist forces and died in Auschwitz.

== In popular culture ==
Actress Susan Sarandon portrayed Sarfatti in the 1999 movie Cradle Will Rock, written and directed by Sarandon's then longtime companion, Tim Robbins. Sarandon discussed her role, saying:

Margherita is someone who is a legitimate historical figure. She really existed. She really was Mussolini's mistress and was very involved in the cultural shaping of Italy's art movements. She was a patron of new painters in Italy. She came over to the United States to sell Mussolini to the American people, and she did that by using Hearst's column. She wrote a column, and that was how they prepared the United States people for the concept of entering the war on the side of Mussolini, I suppose. And also, she was trying to fund the war.

And the complication of this was the fact that she was Jewish, and she in fact supported thus her own crisis, which eventually would make her flee Italy to Argentina and Uruguay for several years until it was safe for her to return. Whether or not she was just in complete denial or she really truly believed that there was a way to sleep with Mussolini and not be held accountable, I don't know. But she ended up in an awkward position. She was hobnobbing with all these rich American people. I think in the context of the film, she's somebody who has a job to do and because she loved art, she sometimes finds herself to be giving all this art away to people she feels don't really appreciate it.

Margherita Sarfatti is portrayed by Barbara Chichiarelli in the 2025 historical drama Mussolini: Son of the Century.

== See also ==
- Leda Rafanelli

== Bibliography ==
- Sarfatti, Margherita (2004) [1925]. The Life of Benito Mussolini. ISBN 1-4179-3962-1
- Sarfatti, Margherita (1929). Il palazzone: romanzo (in Italian). A. Mondadori.
- Sarfatti, Margherita. My Fault: Mussolini As I Knew Him, New York City: Enigma Books, (2014) [1945], edited and annotated with commentary by Brian R. Sullivan. ISBN 1-936-27439-6
