= Giuseppe Ajmone =

Italian painter (1923–2005)

- Born: 17 February 1923; Carpignano Sesia
- Died: 8 April 2005 (aged 82); Romagnano Sesia
- Occupation: Painter
- Awards: Compasso d'Oro

Giuseppe Ajmone (1923–2005) was a modern Italian painter.

== Biography ==
Ajmone was born in Carpignano Sesia, and moved to Milan to study at the Brera Academy in 1941, under Achille Funi and Carlo Carrà.

In 1946, he signed on to a Manifesto del Realismo called Oltre Guernica (English: Beyond Guernica). He participated at an exhibition at the Galleria Bergamini of Milan and received an award at the First National Exhibition of Painting at Bellagio. In 1950, he participated at the 25th International exhibition at the Biennale of Venice. In 1951, he was awarded the Premio Senatore Borletti for young Italian painters.

He often exhibited abroad, including at the Biennale di San Paolo del Brasile in 1951 and 1959; in 1959 at the Biennale Internazionale di Tokyo; in 1955 and 1958 at the Pittsburgh International Museum of Art; and in Copenhagen, Dortmund, Nuremberg, and Buenos Aires.

In 1945 he founded a journal in Novara titled "Numero", which subsequently relocated to Milan under the name "Numero – Pittura" (later "Pittura").

He was awarded the Compasso d'Oro in 1956.

He continued to exhibit until 2004. He painted both landscapes and semi-abstract figures.
