= Baccio Maria Bacci =

Italian painter (1888–1974)

Baccio Maria Bacci (1888 - 1974) was an Italian painter of the Tuscan Novecento movement. He also published various books on contemporary art movements.

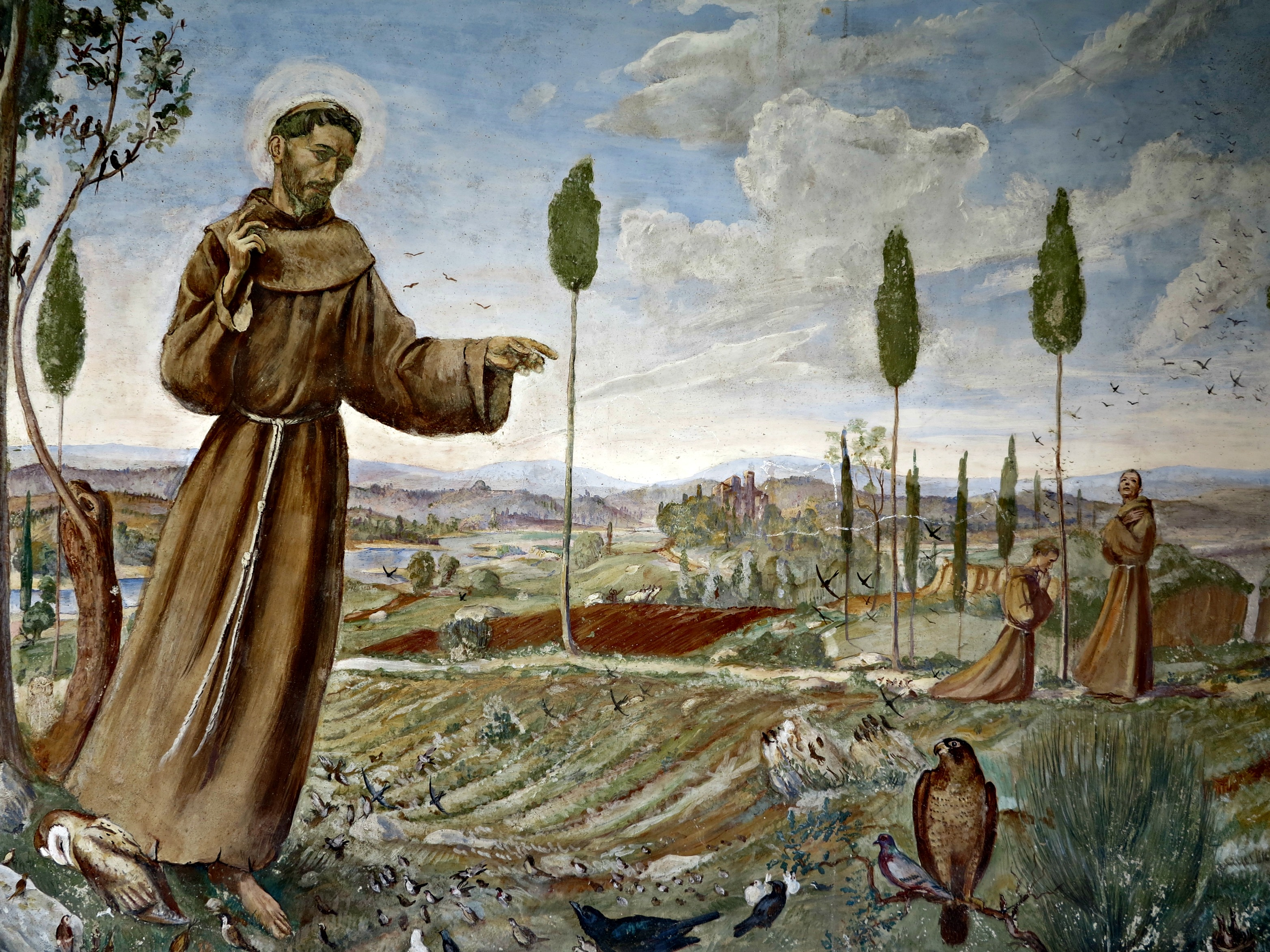
St Francis preaches to birds

== Biography ==
He was born in Florence, he traveled to Paris in 1908. He returned to Florence in 1910 and exhibited with Giovanni Costetti, gaining the encouragement of Emilio Cecchi, Thomas Neal, and Matteo Marangoni. During 1913-1918, he painted in a style influenced by the Futurists, with canvases titled Aeropittoriche. In his later years, he painted for a number of churches and created mosaic designs.

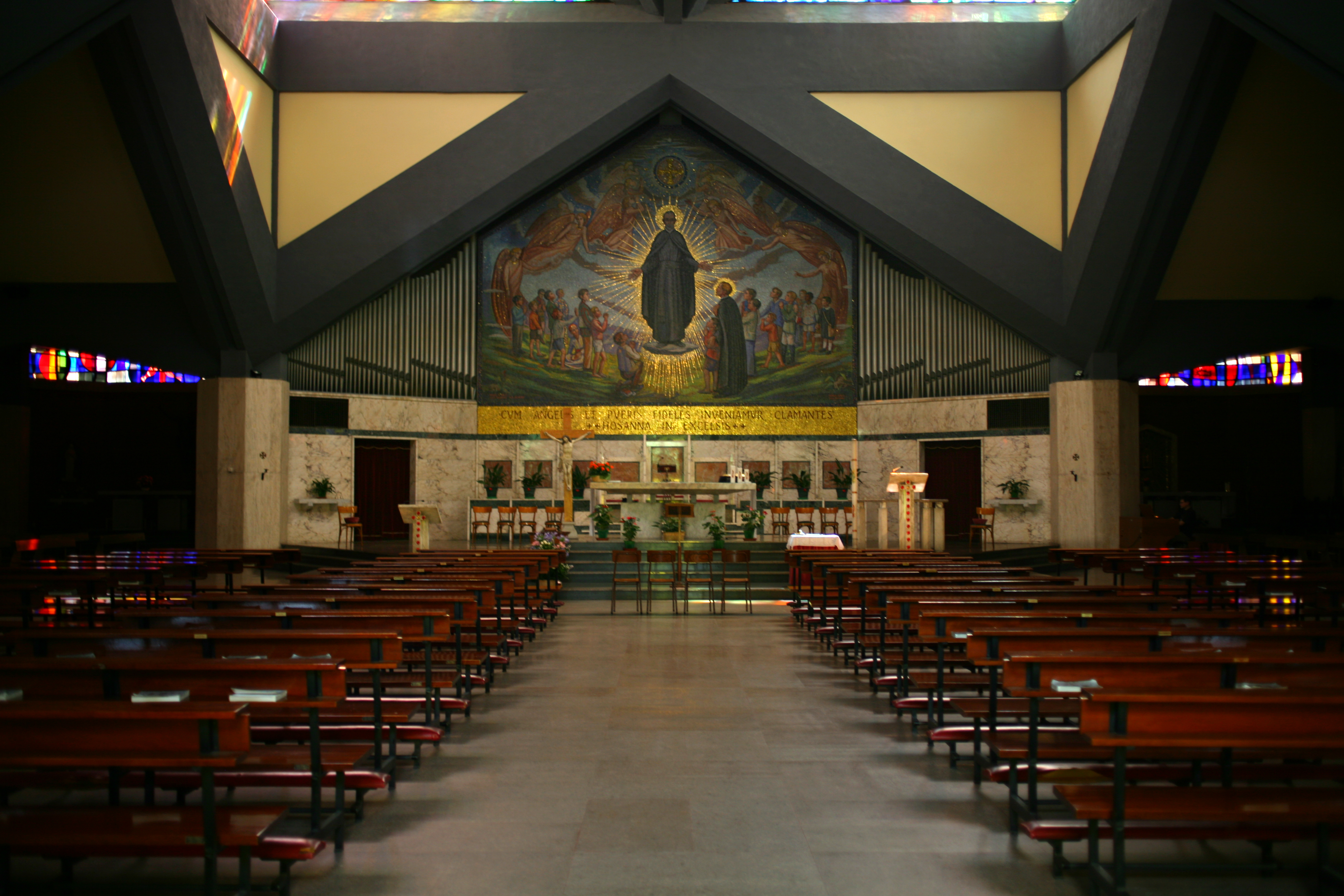
San Giuseppe Calasanzio mosaic
