= Aldo Bergolli =

Italian painter

Aldo Bergolli (1916–1972) was an Italian painter of the Corrente de Vita movement started in Milan as a counterpoint to nationalistic Futurism and the Novecento Italiano movements. He painted both expressionist figurative works, but later focused on more hieroglyphic abstract themes.
