= Return to order =

European art movement

Pablo Picasso, 1921, Head of a woman, pastel on paper, 65.1 x 50.2 cm, Metropolitan Museum of Art, New York

The return to order (French: retour à l'ordre) was a European art movement following the First World War that rejected the extreme avant-garde art of the years up to 1918 and emphasized the classical ideals of order and rationality. The movement is often thought to be a reaction to the war, though strands of the return to order began before its outbreak, such as the Noucentisme movement in Spain. Futurism, which had praised machinery, dynamism, violence and war, was rejected by most of its adherents. The return to order was associated with a revival of classicism and representational painting. Among the many artists who participated in the movement were notable figures in modernism such as Picasso, Braque, Matisse, Cezanne, Renoir, and many of the Italian Futurists.

Artists of the return to order placed high emphasis on the classical ideals of rationality, quality of line, illusionism and order, in opposition to the preceding decades of irrationality and emotional turbulence which characterised the artworks of the avant-garde. Although taking classicism as its foundational inspiration, artists were keen to reinterpret the essence of classical art through the lens of modernism, and a link was often made between the idealism of the classical period and the "Plastic-like" art of the modern era. Many of the works made during the period display modernist tendencies alongside classical subjects and techniques.

This change of direction was reflected and encouraged by the magazine Valori plastici published in Italian and French from 1918 to 1922. The term return to order to describe this renewed interest in tradition is said to derive from Le rappel à l'ordre, a book of essays by the poet and artist Jean Cocteau published in 1926.

== Notable artists ==
- Pablo Picasso
- André Derain
- Georges Braque
- Salvador Dalí
- Giorgio de Chirico
- Mariano Andreu
- Felice Casorati
- Pierre-Auguste Renoir
- Paul Cézanne

== Gallery ==
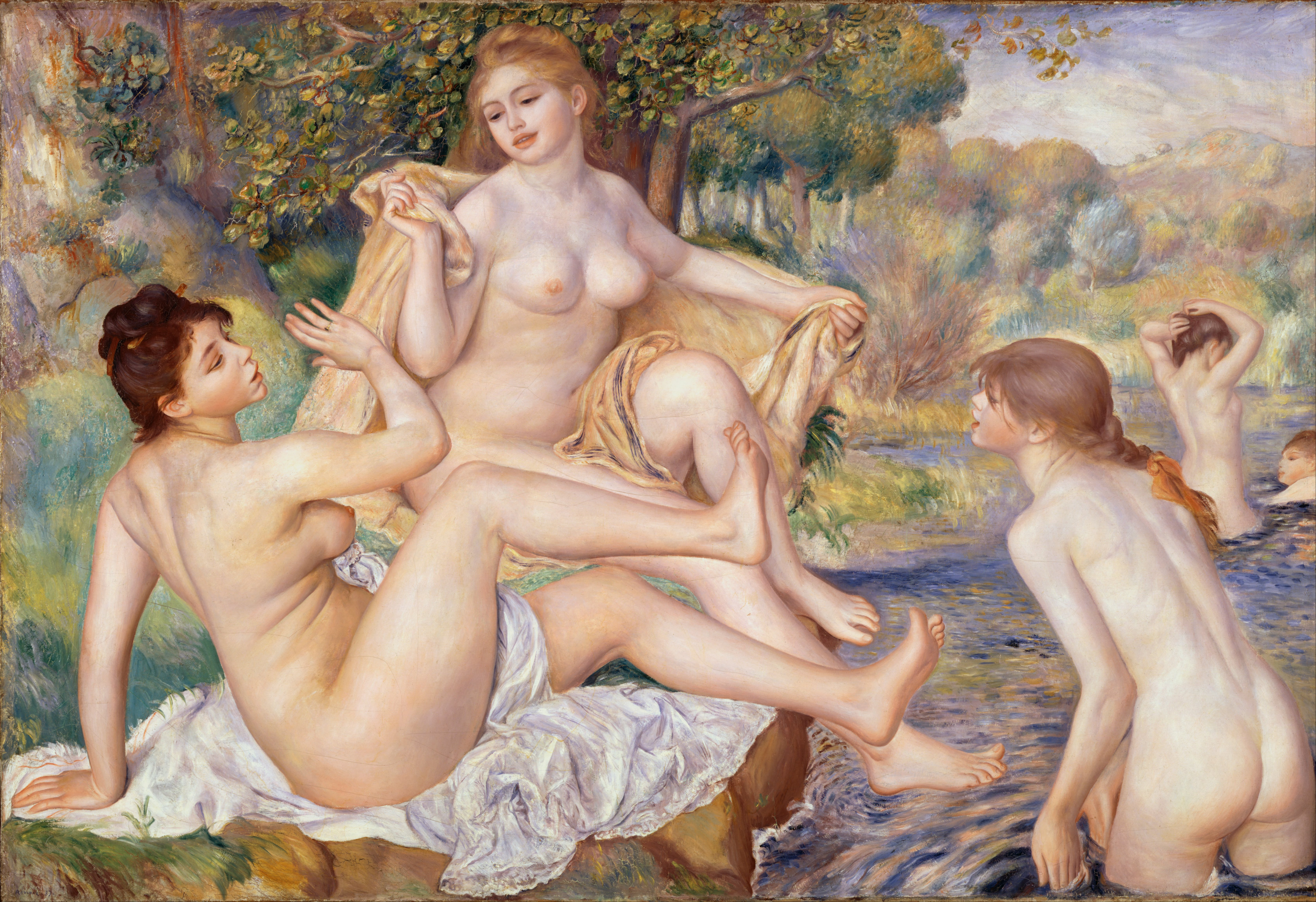
Painting by Renoir that displays an emphasis on line and clarity

Pablo Picasso, Example of the classical principles of art during the return to order.

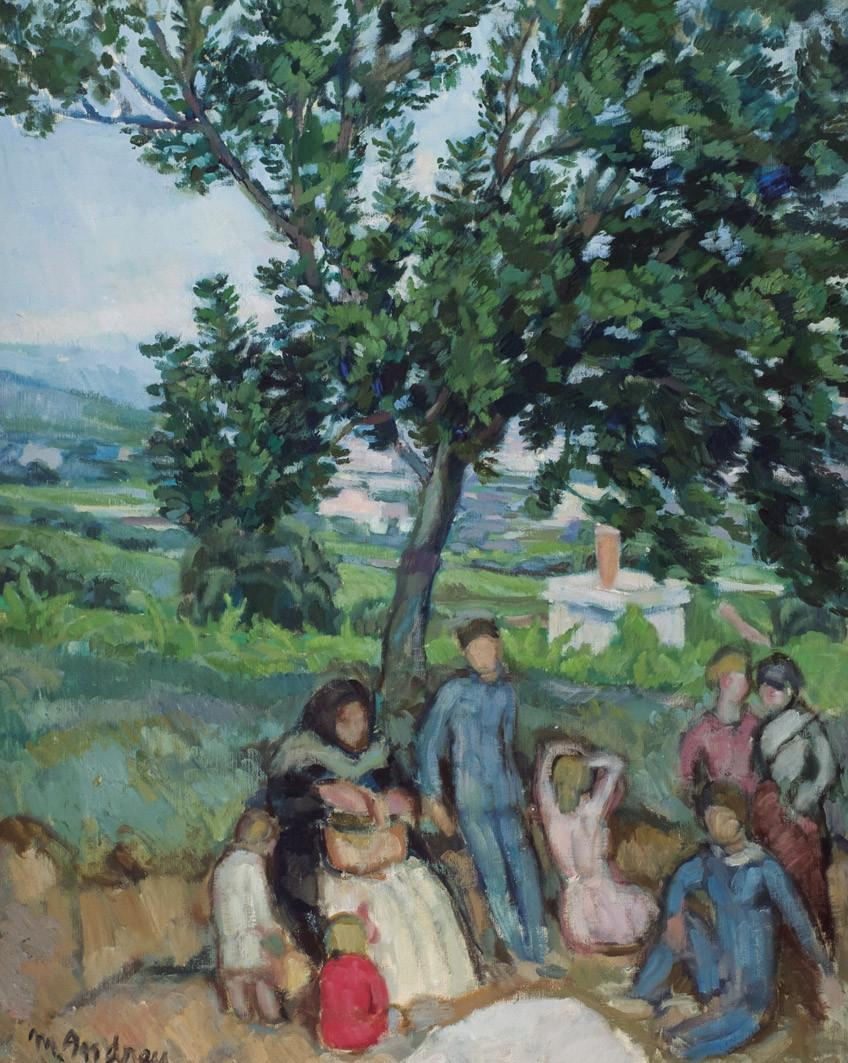
Painting of a landscape with family, Mariano Andreu

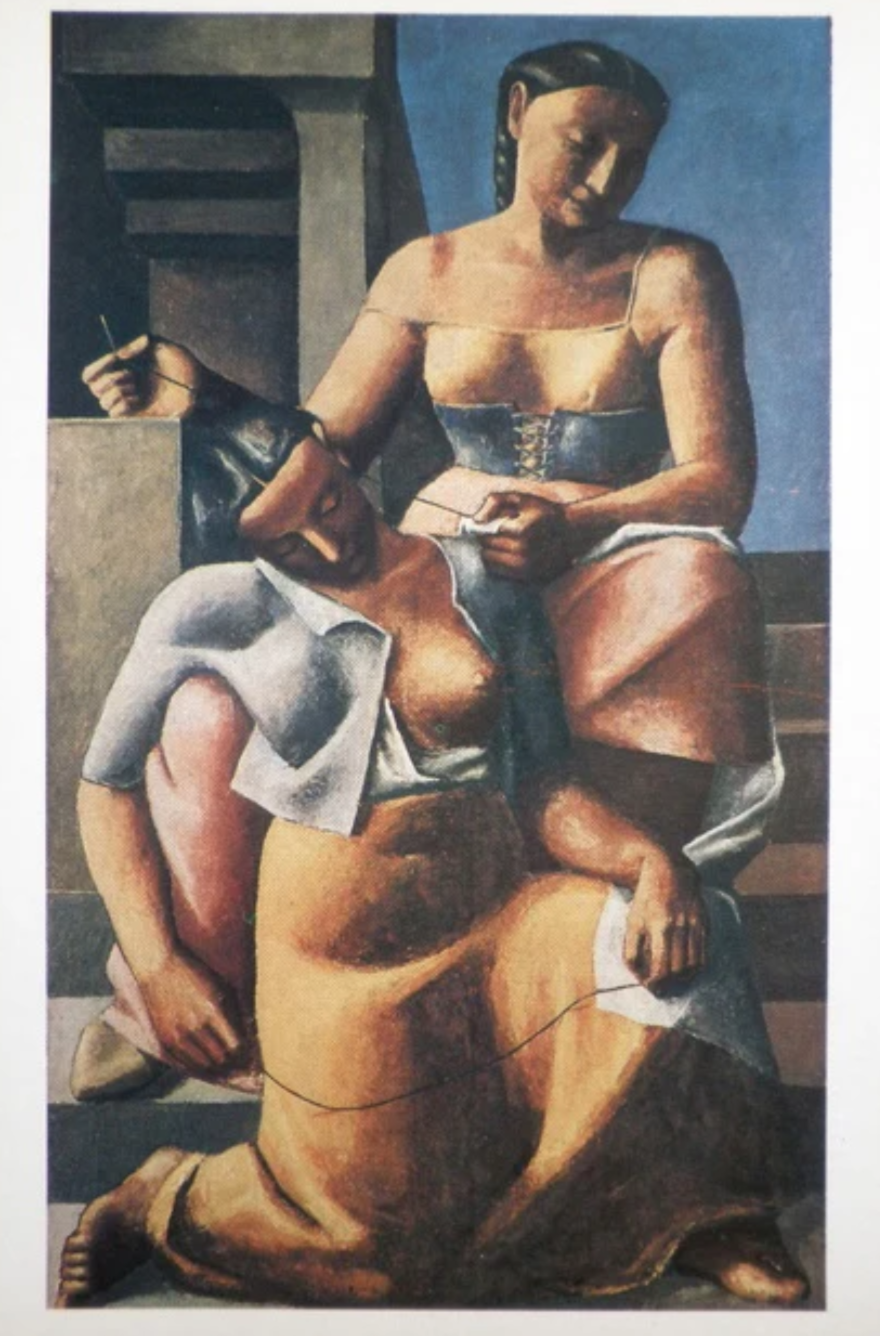
The Seamstresses, Massimo Campigli, 1925. Displays elements of modernism alongside classical aspects.

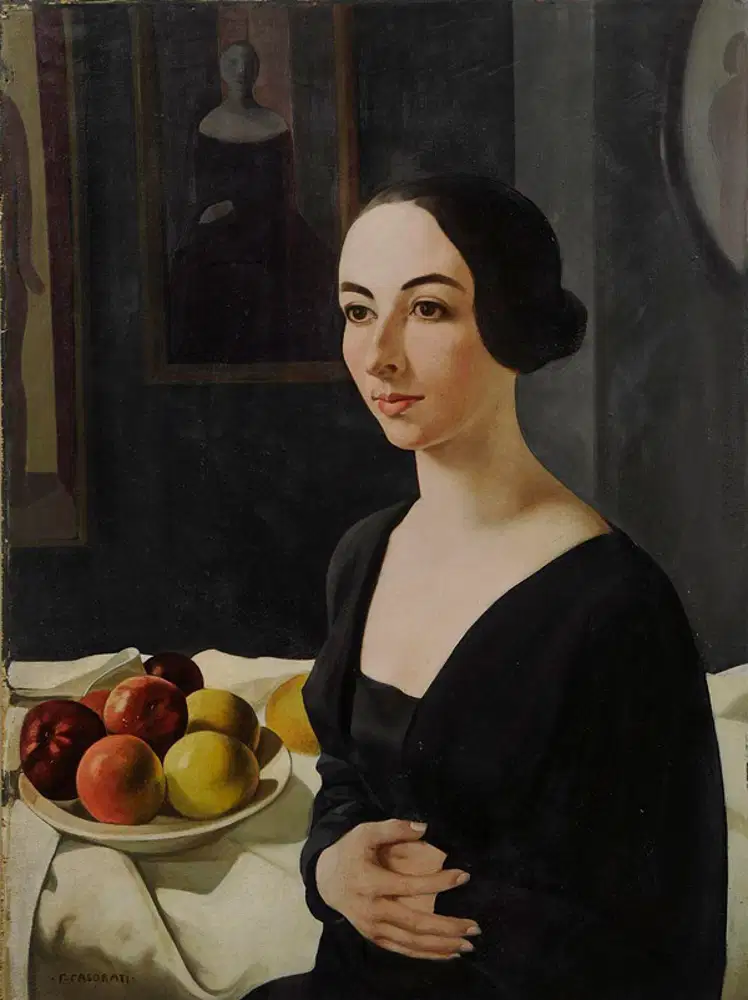
A portrait by Felice Casorati, displaying very strong elements of classical influence.

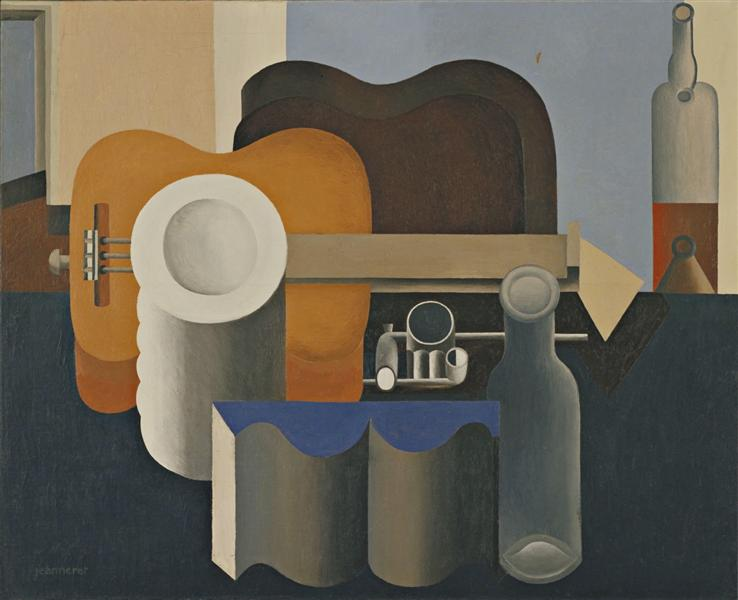
Still Life by Le Corbusier, 1920, which blends the geometric cubist style with classical techniques of shading and representation, as well as order and clarity.

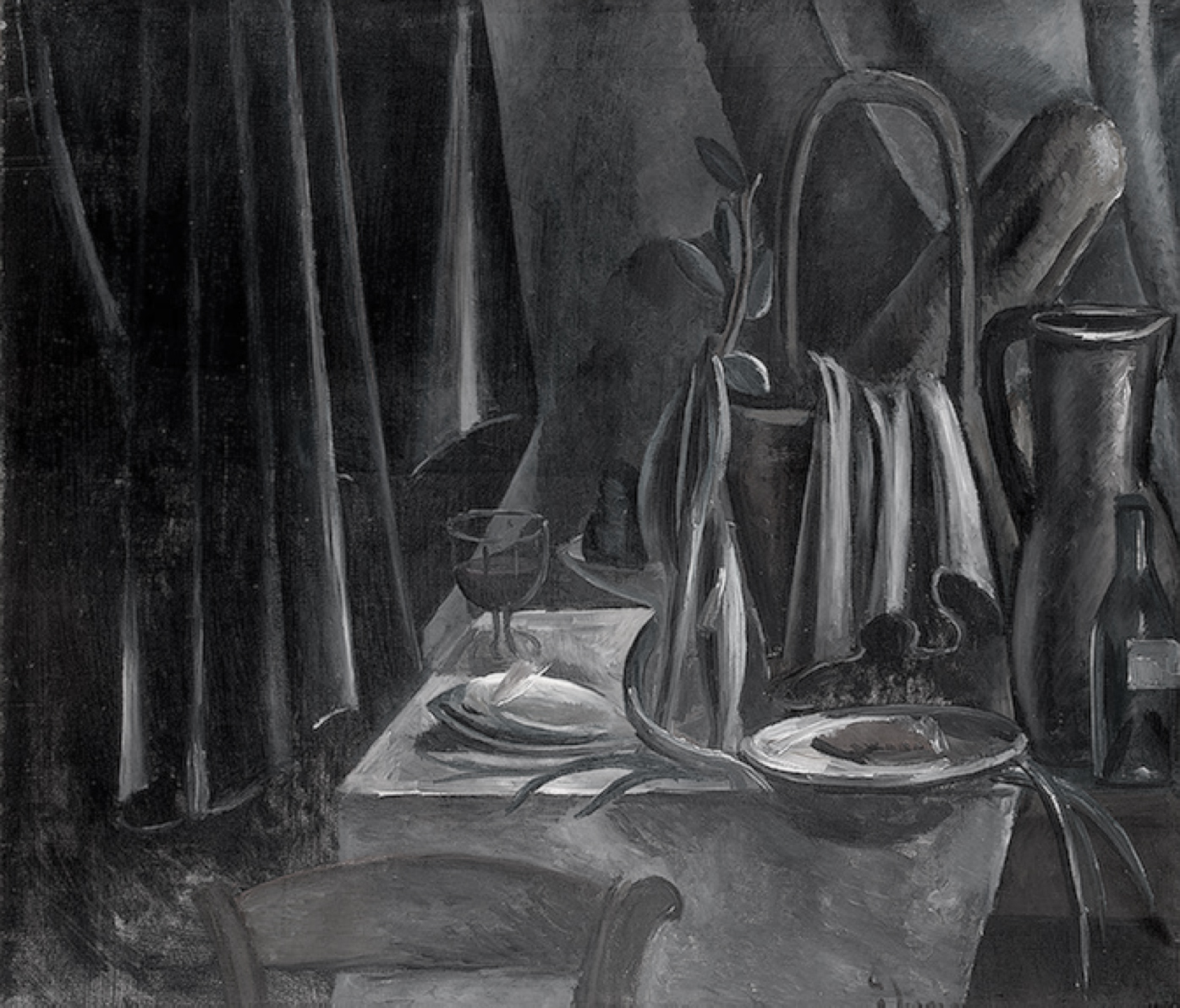
Still Life by André Derain, a forerunner of the Fauvist movement.

== See also ==
- Corrente di Vita
- Novecento Italiano
- Scuola Romana
- Crystal Cubism
- Purism
- Neoclassicism
