= Gino Severini =

Italian painter (1883–1966)

- Severini in 1913
- Born: 7 April 1883; Cortona, Italy
- Died: 26 February 1966 (aged 82); Paris, France
- Education: Rome Fine Art Institute
- Known for: Painting, mosaic, fresco
- Notable work: Pan Pan Dance, Dynamic Hieroglyph of the Bal Tabarin, Italian Lancers at a Gallop, Maternity, Conségna delle Chieve
- Movement: Divisionism, Futurism, Cubism, Return to order, Neo-Classicism, Novecento Italiano
- Awards: Premio Nazionale di Pittura of the Accademia di San Luca, Rome

Signature
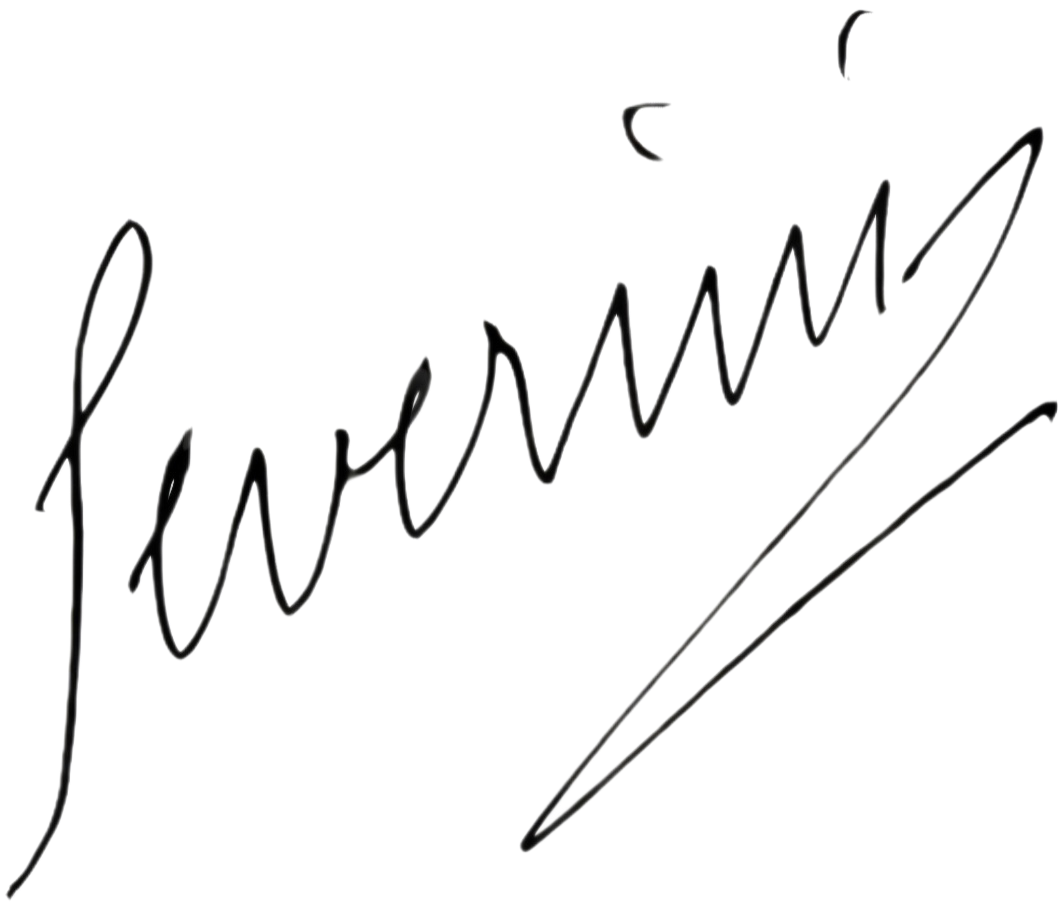

Gino Severini (7 April 1883 – 26 February 1966) was an Italian painter and a leading member of the Futurist movement. For much of his life, he divided his time between Paris and Rome. He was associated with neo-classicism and the "return to order" in the decade after the First World War. During his career, he worked in a variety of media, including mosaic and fresco. He showed his work at major exhibitions, including the Rome Quadrennial, and won art prizes from major institutions.

== Early life ==
Gino Severini, 1910–11, La Modiste (The Milliner), oil on canvas, 64.8 x 48.3 cm, Philadelphia Museum of Art

Severini was born into a poor family in Cortona, Italy. His father was a junior court official, and his mother a dressmaker. He studied at the Scuola Tecnica in Cortona until the age of fifteen, when he and a group of classmates were expelled from the entire Italian school system for the attempted theft of exam papers. The boys escaped a custodial sentence, but Severini never again attended formal education. For a while, he worked with his father; then in 1899, he moved to Rome with his mother. It was there that he first showed a serious interest in art, painting in his spare time while working as a shipping clerk. With the help of a patron of Cortonese origins, he attended art classes, enrolling in the free school for nude studies (an annex of the Rome Fine Art Institute) and a private academy. His formal art education ended after two years when his patron stopped his allowance, declaring, "I absolutely do not understand your lack of order."

Gino Severini, 1905, La Bohémienne, pastel on paper laid down on canvas, Museo dell'Accademia Etrusca e della città di Cortona

Gino Severini, 1911, Souvenirs de Voyage (Memories of a Journey, Ricordi di viaggio), oil on canvas, 47 x 75 cm, private collection

Gino Severini, 1912, Dynamic Hieroglyphic of the Bal Tabarin, oil on canvas with sequins, 161.6 x 156.2 cm (63.6 x 61.5 in.), Museum of Modern Art, New York

Gino Severini, 1912, Dancer at Pigalle, oil and sequins on sculpted gesso on artist's canvasboard, 69.2 x 49.8 cm, Baltimore Museum of Art

In 1900, he met the painter Umberto Boccioni. Together they visited the studio of Giacomo Balla, where they were introduced to the technique of Divisionism, painting with adjacent rather than mixed colours and breaking the painted surface into a field of stippled dots and stripes. The ideas of Divisionism had a great influence on Severini's early work and on Futurist painting from 1910 to 1911.

Severini settled in Paris in November 1906. The move was momentous for him. He said later, "The cities to which I feel most strongly bound are Cortona and Paris: I was born physically in the first, intellectually and spiritually in the second." He lived in Montmartre and dedicated himself to painting. There he met most of the rising artists of the period, befriending Amedeo Modigliani and occupying a studio next to those of Raoul Dufy, Georges Braque and Suzanne Valadon. He knew most of the Parisian avant-garde, including Jean Metzinger, Albert Gleizes, Juan Gris, Pablo Picasso, Lugné-Poe and his theatrical circle, the poets Guillaume Apollinaire, Paul Fort, Max Jacob, and author Jules Romains. The sale of his work did not provide enough to live on and he depended on the generosity of patrons.

== Futurism ==
He was invited by Filippo Tommaso Marinetti and Boccioni to join the Futurist movement and was a co-signatory, with Balla, Boccioni, Carlo Carrà, and Luigi Russolo, of the Manifesto of the Futurist Painters in February 1910 and the Technical Manifesto of Futurist Painting in April the same year. He was an important link between artists in France and Italy and came into contact with Cubism before his Futurist colleagues. Following a visit to Paris in 1911, the Italian Futurists adopted a sort of Cubism, which gave them a means of analysing energy in paintings and expressing dynamism. Severini helped to organize the first Futurist exhibition outside Italy at Galerie Bernheim-Jeune, Paris, in February 1912 and participated in subsequent Futurist shows in Europe and the United States. In 1913, he had solo exhibitions at the Marlborough Gallery, London, and Der Sturm, Berlin; it was during the show in London when he met and befriended British artist C. R. W. Nevinson, ultimately leading to the latter's decision to become a fellow Futurist.

In his autobiography, written many years later, he records that the Futurists were pleased with the response to the exhibition at Galerie Bernheim-Jeune, but that influential critics, notably Apollinaire, mocked them for their pretensions, their ignorance of the main currents of modern art and their provincialism. Severini later came to agree with Apollinaire.

Severini was less attracted to the subject of the machine than his fellow Futurists and frequently chose the form of the dancer to express Futurist theories of dynamism in art. He was particularly adept at rendering lively urban scenes, for example, in Dynamic Hieroglyph of the Bal Tabarin (1912) and The Boulevard (1913). During the First World War, he produced some of the finest Futurist war art, notably his Italian Lancers at a Gallop (1915) and Armoured Train (1915). He spent part of the war in Barcelona, but returned to Paris by July 1915.

== Crystal Cubism and Neo-classicism ==
In 1916, Severini departed from Futurism and painted several works in a naturalistic style inspired by his interest in early Renaissance art. After the First World War, Severini gradually abandoned the Futurist style and painted in a synthetic Crystal Cubist style until 1920. By 1920, he was applying theories of classical balance based on the Golden Section to still lifes and figurative subjects from the traditional commedia dell'arte. He became part of the "return to order" in the arts in the post-war era. Works such as The Two Pulchinellas (1922) exemplify Severini's turn toward a more conservative, analytic type of painting, which nonetheless suggests metaphysical overtones.

After 1920, Severini divided his time between Paris and Rome. In 1921, he was commissioned by George Sitwell to paint murals for Montegufoni castle, which the latter had bought in 1909; the same year, Severini published Du cubisme au classicisme: Esthétique du compas et du nombre, a book summarizing his research into mathematical theories of harmony and proportion. The murals were completed in 1922.

In 1923 and 1925, he took part in the Rome Biennale. He exhibited in Milan with artists of the Novecento Italiano group in 1926 and 1929 and in their Geneva exhibition of 1929. From 1928, he began to incorporate elements of Rome's classical landscape in his work. In 1930, he took part in the Venice Biennale, exhibited in the Rome Quadrennials of 1931 and 1935, and in 1935 won the first prize for painting, with an entire room devoted to his work. He contributed a cycle of works to the Paris Exhibition. He explored fresco and mosaic techniques and executed murals in various media in Switzerland, France, and Italy.

During this decade, he taught the Swiss printmaker Lill Tschudi, who had previously studied at the Grosvenor School of Modern Art.

== Later life ==
In the 1940s, Severini's style became semi-abstract. In the 1950s, he returned to his Futurist subjects: dancers, light and movement. He executed commissions for the church of Saint-Pierre in Freiburg and inaugurated the Conségna delle Chiavi ("Delivery of the Keys") mosaic. His mosaics were shown at the Cahiers d'Art gallery in Paris, and he participated in a conference on the history of mosaic at Ravenna. He received commissions to decorate the offices of KLM in Rome and Alitalia in Paris and took part in the exhibition The Futurists, Balla - Severini 1912–1918 at the Rose Fried Gallery in New York. In Rome, he reconstructed his Pan Pan Dance mosaic, which had been destroyed in the war. He was awarded the Premio Nazionale di Pittura of the Accademia di San Luca in Rome, exhibited at the 9th Rome Quadrennial, and was given a solo exhibition at the Accademia di San Luca.

Throughout his career, he published important theoretical essays and books on art, including The artist and Society, (trans. Bernard Wall, Harvill Press (1946). In 1946, he also published an autobiography, The Life of a Painter.

Severini died in Paris on 26 February 1966, aged 82. He was buried at Cortona.

== Gallery ==
La Danseuse Obsedante (The Haunting Dancer, Ruhelose Tanzerin), 1911, oil on canvas, 73.5 x 54 cm, private collection

Le Boulevard, 1911, oil on canvas, 63.5 x 91.5 cm, Estorick Collection, London

The Pan Pan Dance (The Pan Pan Dance). The original 1911 version was destroyed. This new version he painted in 1959–60, now at Musée National d'Art Moderne, Paris

Dynamism of a Dancer (Dinamismo di una danzatrice, Ballerina di chahut), 1912, oil on canvas, 60 x 45 cm, Jucker Collection, Pinacoteca di Brera, Milan

La danse de l'ours au Moulin Rouge, 1913, oil on canvas, 100 x 73.5 cm, Musée National d'Art Moderne, Paris

Gino Severini, 1913, Tango Argentino, work on paper (published on the cover of Der Sturm, Volume 4, Number 192-193, 1 January 1914)

c.1915-16, dimensions and whereabouts unknown, photo Léonce Rosenberg, published in Action: Cahiers Individualistes de Philosophie et d’art, Volume 1, Number 2, March 1920

Nature Morte (still life), 1919

Nature morte à la guitare, 1919. Private collection

Bohémien Jouant de L'Accordéon (The Accordion Player), 1919, Museo del Novecento, Milan

Maternité, 1920

Paintings by Gino Severini, 1911, La Danse du Pan-Pan, and Severini, 1913, L'autobus. Published in Les Annales politiques et littéraires, Le Paradoxe Cubiste, 14 March 1920

Paintings by Gino Severini, 1911, Souvenirs de Voyage, Albert Gleizes, 1912, Man on a Balcony, L’Homme au balcon, Severini, 1912–13, Portrait de Mlle Jeanne Paul-Fort, Luigi Russolo, 1911–12, La Révolte. Les Annales politiques et littéraires, Le Paradoxe Cubiste, n. 1916, 14 March 1920

Nature morte (Still-life), January 1920

Mosaic of San Marco, 1961 - decoration on the front-facade of the Church of St. Mark Cortona, Italy

== Public collections ==
Among the public collections holding works by Gino Severini are:

- Museum de Fundatie, Zwolle, Netherland
- Guggenheim Museum, New York
- Museum of Modern Art, New York

== Bibliography ==
- Santarelli, Cristina (2014). "From Figuration to Abstraction: Dance in the Paintings of Gino Severini". Music in Art: International Journal for Music Iconography. 39 (1–2): 167–180. ISSN 1522-7464.
