= Anselmo Bucci =

Italian painter

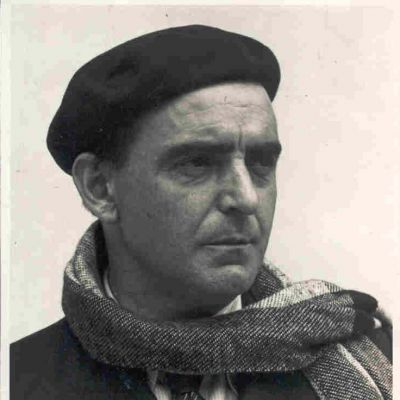
Anselmo Bucci (before) 1955

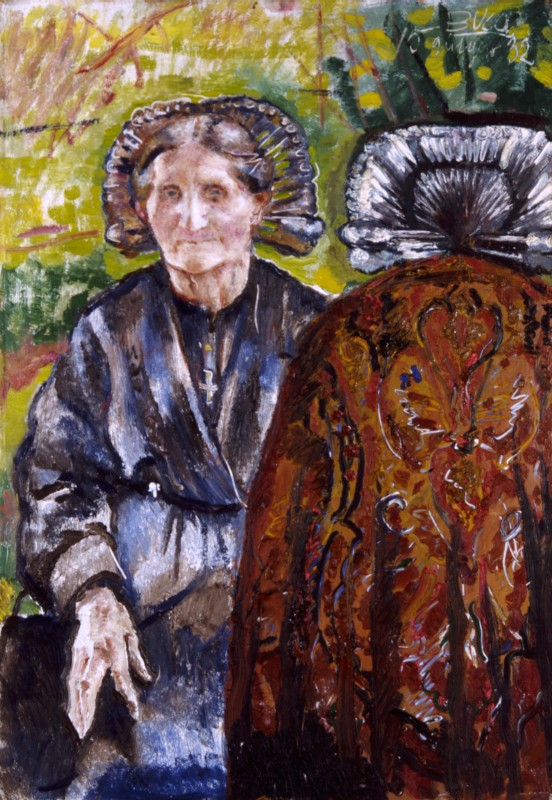
Sorelle brianzole, 1932 (Art collections of Fondazione Cariplo)

Anselmo Bucci (25 May 1887 – 19 November 1955) was an Italian painter and printmaker.

== Biography ==
Bucci was born in Fossombrone, Italy. Having attended the Brera Academy in Milan from 1904 to 1905, he moved to Paris with Leonardo Dudreville in 1906. As a painter of Symbolist works with marked Fauvist overtones, he made his debut at the Salon des Art Décoratifs in 1907 and took part in the Salon des Indépendants from 1910 on. He enlisted in the Volunteer Cyclist Battalion in 1915 and his first solo show (Milan, Famiglia Artistica, 1915) took place while he was on leave.

In 1922, he fell in with the movement for a return to order of the Novecento Italiano in the post-war period, and took part in a joint exhibition at the Venice Biennale, first at the 12th Esposizione Internazionale d'Arte di Venezia in 1920 and then again in 1924, on which occasion one of his works was bought for the city's gallery of modern art. One of the founding members of the "Sette pittori del Novecento Italiano", he took part in the group's first show in 1926 but not the second. During the 1930s, when he divided his time between Milan and Paris, Neoclassical rigidity gave way to greater freedom in his painting. It was in 1938 that he produced the fresco Italian Civilization Putting an End to Slavery for the Palazzo di Giustizia in Milan. He died in Monza, aged 68.

== Other projects ==
Media related to Anselmo Bucci at Wikimedia Commons
