= Leonardo Dudreville =

Italian painter (1885–1975)

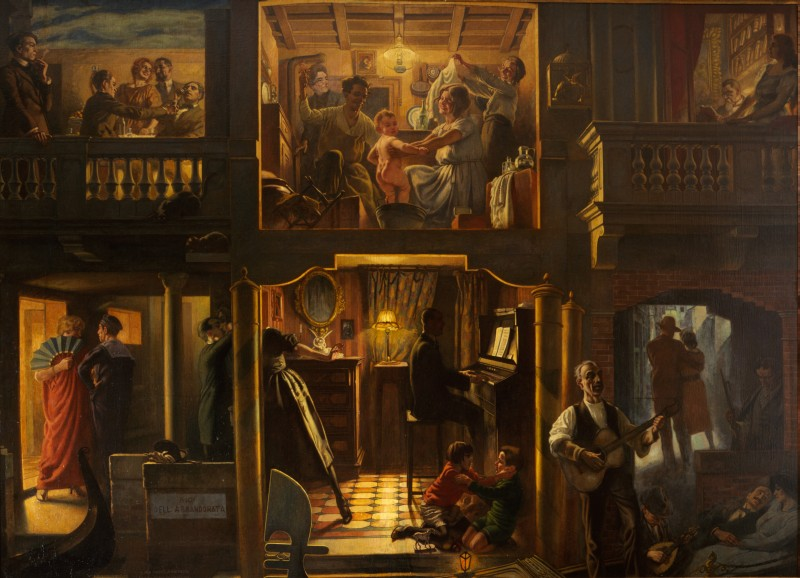
Amore: discorso primo, 1924 (Fondazione Cariplo)

Leonardo Dudreville (4 April 1885 – 13 January 1975) was a Venetian-born Italian painter. He was one of the founders of the Nuove Tendenze as well as of Novecento Italiano art movements.

== Biography ==
His family of Belgian origin moved to Milan when he was a child. He studied at the Brera Academy in Milan from 1903 to 1905 and joined the Coenobium, a group of young artists belonging to the Scapigliatura movement, in Monza together with his friend Anselmo Bucci. After a stay in Paris (1906–07), his Divisionist style brought him into contact with Alberto Grubicy's gallery. He adopted Futurism in 1912 and was one of the founders of Nuove Tendenze movement. In close contact with the critic Margherita Sarfatti in the years following World War I, he took part in the Venice Biennale (13th Esposizione Internazionale d’Arte di Venezia) in 1922, and in the following year was one of the group of Sette pittori del Novecento who started the Novecento Italiano art movement exhibiting at the Galleria Pesaro in Milan. Relations between members of the Novecento movement were not always smooth, as shown by his participation in their first group exhibition in 1926 but not in the second in 1929. One of his works was bought in 1928 for the Galleria d’Arte Moderna in Milan, and his first solo exhibition was held in 1936 at the Milanese Galleria Dedalo. His style became increasingly meticulous with a wealth of detail. During World War II he withdrew to Ghiffa, where he stayed until his death.

== Other projects ==
Media related to Leonardo Dudreville at Wikimedia Commons
