= Gian Emilio Malerba =

Italian painter (1880–1926)

Gian Emilio Malerba (1880–1926) was an Italian painter and illustrator, one of the founders of the Novecento Italiano in Milan. He initially created works in a Liberty or Art Nouveau style.

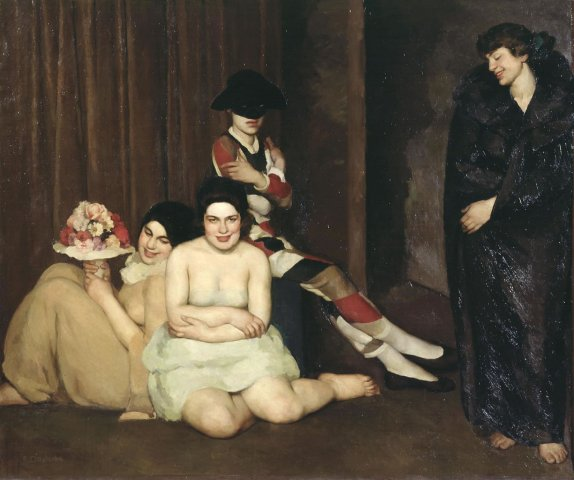
Maschere, 1922

== Biography ==
Malerba was born in Milan and studied at the Brera Academy under Cesare Tallone and Giuseppe Mentessi. His first exhibit at the Academy was in 1906, works influenced by the Scapigliatura movement. In 1913, he was awarded the Canonica prize. In 1906 he created cover pages for "Lettura" and "Ars et Labor".

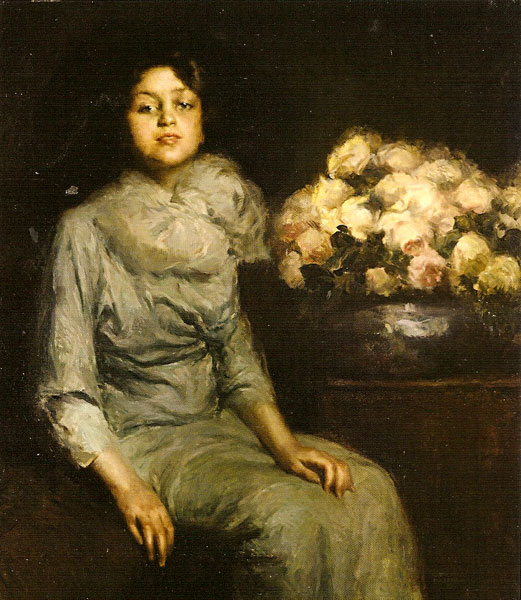
Il Cappello nero, 1912

He became part of the circle of painters patronized by Margherita Sarfatti, known as the Novecento Italiano.
