= Post-expressionism =

Post-war art movement

Post-expressionism is a term coined by the German art critic Franz Roh to describe a variety of movements in the post-war art world which were influenced by expressionism but defined themselves through rejecting its aesthetic. Roh first used the term in an essay in 1925, "Magic Realism: Post-Expressionism", to contrast to Gustav Friedrich Hartlaub's "New Objectivity", which more narrowly characterized these developments within German art. Though Roh saw "post-expressionism" and "magic realism" as synonymous, later critics characterized distinctions between magic realism and other artists initially identified by Hartlaub and have also pointed out other artists in Europe who had different stylistic tendencies but were working within the same trend.

== Background ==
Leading up to World War I, much of the art world was under the influence of Futurism and Expressionism. Both movements abandoned any sense of order or commitment to objectivity or tradition.

The sentiment of Futurists was most vocally expressed by Filippo Marinetti in the Futurist Manifesto, where he called for a rejection of the past, a rejection of all imitation — of other artists or of the outside world — and praised the virtue of originality and triumph of technology. The Futurist poet Vladimir Mayakovsky, along these lines, said “After seeing electricity, I lost interest in nature.” Marinetti and other Futurists glorified war and violence as a way to revolution – bringing freedom, establishing new ideas, and rallying one to fight for one's own people – and as war was shaping up in Europe, many saw it and encouraged a way to “purify” the culture and destroy old, obsolete elements of society.

Expressionists, likewise abandoning imitation nature, sought to express emotional experience, but often centered their art around angst — inner turmoil; whether in reaction to the modern world, to alienation from society, or in the creation of personal identity. In concert with this evocation of angst, expressionists also echoed some of the same feelings of revolution as did Futurists. This is evidenced by a 1919 anthology of expressionist poetry titled Menschheitsdämmerung, which translates to “Dawn of Humanity” — meant to suggest that humanity was in a 'twilight'; that there was an imminent demise of some old way of being and beneath it the urgings of a new dawning.

Both futurism and expressionism were always met by opposition, but the destruction that occurred in the war had heightened the criticism against them. Following the war, in and throughout different artistic circles there was a call for a return to order and re-appreciation of tradition and of the natural world. In Italy, this was encouraged by the magazine Valori Plastici and came together in the Novecento, a group that exhibited in the Venice Biennale and was joined by many Futurists who had rejected their former work. Mario Sironi, a member of this group, stated that they “would not imitate the world created by God but would be inspired by it.” The “New Objectivity” or Neue Sachlichkeit, as coined by Hartlaub, described the developments in Germany and became the title of an exhibition that he staged in 1925. Neue Sachlichkeit was influenced not only by the “return to order” but also a call to arms among more left-leaning artists who wanted to use their art in a forward, political manner that expressionism didn't enable them to do. In Belgium, there was another vein in the common trend, which would later be referred to as a “retour à l’humain”.

== Movements ==
When Hartlaub defined the idea of the Neue Sachlichkeit, he identified two groups: the verists, who “[tore] the objective form of the world of contemporary facts and represent current experience in its tempo and fevered temperature,” and the classicists, who “[searched] more for the object of timeless ability to embody the external laws of existence in the artistic sphere.”

Although Roh originally meant the term 'Magic Realism' to be more or less synonymous with Neue Sachlichkeit, the artists identified by Hartlaub as 'classicists' later became associated with Roh's term. These 'Magic Realists' were all influenced by the classicism developed in Italy by the Novecento, and in turn by de Chirico's concept of metaphysical art, which had also branched into surrealism. Art critic Wieland Schmeid in 1977 posited that despite the fact that the terms were meant to refer to the same thing, the understanding of them as different groups derives from the fact that the movement had a right and left wing, with the Magic Realists on the right — many later supporting fascism or accommodating to it— and the verists we associate as the Neue Sachlichkeit on the left — fighting against fascism. The two groups in addition to having different political philosophies likewise had different artistic philosophies.

The third movement that is important to include in post-expressionism, and which Roh excluded, is the reaction to Flemish Expressionism, as opposed to strains of German expressionism and Italian futurism. This is typically referred to as animism.

=== Magic Realism ===
Due canarini in gabbia by Antonio Donghi, 1932

Tulpen auf der Fensterbank by Anton Räderscheidt, 1926

'Magic Realism' for Roh, as a reaction to expressionism, meant to declare “[that] the autonomy of the objective world around us was once more to be enjoyed; the wonder of matter that could crystallize into objects was to be seen anew.” With the term, he was emphasizing the “magic” of the normal world as it presents itself to us — how, when we really look at everyday objects, they can appear strange and fantastic.

In Italy, the style that Roh identified was created by a confluence of a renewed focus on harmony and technique called for by the “return to order” and metaphysical art, a style which had been developed by Carlo Carrà and Giorgio de Chirico, two members of the Novecento. Carrà described his purpose as to explore the imagined inner life of familiar objects when represented out of their explanatory contexts: their solidity, their separateness in the space allotted to them, the secret dialogue that may take place between them.

The leading painter in Italy associated with this style is perhaps Antonio Donghi, who kept to traditional subject matter — popular life, landscapes, and still life — but presented it with strong composition and spatial clarity to give it gravity and stillness. His still lifes often consist of a small vase of flowers, depicted with the disarming symmetry of naive art. He also often painted birds carefully arranged for display in their cages, and dogs and other animals ready to perform for circus acts, to suggest an artificial arrangement placed on top of nature. In Germany, Anton Räderscheidt followed a style similar to Donghi, turning to magic realism after abandoning constructivism. Georg Schrimpf is somewhat like the two, working in a style influenced by primitivism.

Filippo De Pisis, who is often associated with metaphysical art, can also be seen as a magic realist. Like Donghi, he often painted traditional subjects, but rather than developing a strict classical style, used a more painterly brush to bring out the intimacy of the objects, similar to the Belgian animists. His association with metaphysical art comes from the fact that he would often contrapose objects in his still lifes, and set them in a scene that gave them context.

Another artist in Italy considered a magic realist is Felice Casorati, whose paintings are rendered with fine technique but often distinguished by unusual perspective effects and bold colorfulness. In 1925, Rafaello Giolli summarized the disconcerting aspects of Casorati's art — “The volumes have no weight in them, and the colors no body. Everything is fictitious: even the living lack all nervous vitality. The sun seems to be the moon ... nothing is fixed or definite.”

Other German artists who worked within this style are Alexander Kanoldt and Carl Grossberg. Kanoldt painted still lifes and portraits, while Grossberg painted urban landscapes and industrial sites rendered with chilly precision.

=== New Objectivity and Verism ===
The artists most associated with the Neue Sachlichkeit today are those Hartlaub identified as 'verists'. These artists tended to oppose expressionism, but did not so much exemplify the “return to order” as much as they opposed what they saw as the political impotence of expressionist art. They sought to involve themselves into revolutionary politics and their form of realism distorted appearances to emphasize the ugly, as they wanted to expose what they considered the ugliness of reality. The art was raw, provocative, and harshly satirical.

Bertolt Brecht, a German dramatist, was an early critic of Expressionism, referring to it as constrained and superficial. Just like in politics Germany had a new parliament but lacked parliamentarians, he argued, in literature there was an expression of delight in ideas, but no new ideas, and in theater a 'will to drama', but no real drama. His early plays, Baal and Trommeln in der Nacht (Drums in the Night) express repudiations of fashionable interest in Expressionism. Opposed to the focus on individual emotional experience in expressionist art, Brecht began a collaborative method to play production, starting with his Man Equals Man project.

Overall, the verist critique of expressionism was influenced by Dadaism. The early exponents of Dada had been drawn together in Switzerland, a neutral country in the war, and in common cause, they wanted to use their art as a form of moral and cultural protest — shaking off not only the constraints of nationality, but also of artistic language, in order to express political outrage and encourage political action. Expressionism, to Dadaists, expressed all of the angst and anxieties of society, but was helpless to do anything about it.

Out of this, Dada cultivated a “satirical hyperrealism”, as termed by Raoul Hausmann, and of which the best known examples are the graphical works and photo-montages of John Heartfield. Use of collage in these works became a compositional principle to blend reality and art, as if to suggest that to record the facts of reality was to go beyond the most simple appearances of things. This later developed into portraits and scenes by artists such as George Grosz, Otto Dix, and Rudolf Schlichter. Portraits would give emphasis to particular features or objects that were seen as distinctive aspects of the person depicted. Satirical scenes often depicted a madness behind what was happening, depicting the participants as cartoon-like.

Other verist artists, like Christian Schad, depicted reality with a clinical precision, which suggested both an empirical detachment and intimate knowledge of the subject. Schad's paintings are characterized "an artistic perception so sharp that it seems to cut beneath the skin", according to Schmied. Often, psychological elements were introduced in his work, which suggested an underlying unconscious reality to life.

=== Animism ===
Bont strandzicht by Henri-Victor Wolvens, 1959. Wolvens began his style in the 1920s but worked until his death in 1977.

In Belgium, expressionism had been influenced by artists like James Ensor and Louis Pevernagie who had combined expressionism with symbolism. Ensor, known for his paintings of people in masks, carnival outfits, and side-by-side with skeletons, also often painted realistic scenes, but imbued them with a fevered brush, garish colors, and strong contrasts to suggest a strange unreality present in them, as did Pevernagie. Expressionism was also exhibited in the Latemse School, where adherents like Constant Permeke and Hubert Malfait used brushwork in painting and loose form in sculpture to show a mystic reality behind nature.

In what had been called a “retour à l’humain” (return to the human), many artists working in Belgium after the war had kept the expressive brush of their forebears, but had rejected what they had seen as the anti-human, unreal distortions in their subject matter. The goal was to use the expressive brush to depict the soul or spirit of the objects, people, and places they were painting, rather than a hyperbolic, externalized, displaced angst of the artist. These artists were often characterized as 'introverts', as opposed to the 'extroverts' of expressionism.

Stillleben mit Kaffeekanne by Floris Jespers, 1932. Jespers was influenced by animism after the war.

Belgian art critic Paul Haesaerts later gave this movement the title animism, which he took from anthropologist E.B. Tylor's book Primitive Culture (1871) describing 'animism' as primitive religion that based itself on the idea a soul inhabited all objects. Later, Haesaerts, driven by criticism to do so, also used the terms réalisme poétique and intimism, although animism is still most commonly used in literature. Intimism will more often refer to the art practiced by some members of the Nabis.

The most recognized painter of these artists is Henri-Victor Wolvens, who painted many scenes of the beach and ocean at Ostend. In his beach scenes, harsh waves are painted with a rough brush, clouds in patches — rougher when in storm — and the sand with a scraped quality. Figures are painted as simply as possible, often as stick figures, and given translucency and movement — so his bathers show the activity of the beach and it the activity of the bathers blend in with the motion of the waves crashing ashore.

The work of Floris Jespers was strongly influenced by an animist spirit after the war. He uses form and color to give different degrees of vividness to the subjects in his paintings, each to the degree that one would associate them with in life.

Other painters associated with this movement are Anne Bonnet, Albert Dasnoy, Henri Evenepoel, Mayou Iserentant, Jacques Maes, Marcel Stobbaerts, Albert Van Dyck, Louis Van Lint, War Van Overstraeten and Jozef Vinck.

Filippo De Pisis, referenced above, exhibited animist tendencies.

George Grard is the sculptor most associated with animism. Like expressionists, he went against both naturalism and classical tendencies, but used exaggerations from his models to heighten the feeling and sensuality of the form, and chose lyrical subjects. Grard was friends with Charles LePlae, who had a similar style, but kept more in line with natural and classical forms.

Herman De Cuyper is also associated with animism, and abstracted to a more extreme degree than did Grard or LaPlae, and in some ways is more similar to Henry Moore.

== Counter-movements ==
An early revolt against the imposed classicism that was popular in the Novecento took place with the founding of the Scuola Romana.

=== Romantic Expressionism ===
Corrado Cagli was a member of this group, and identified himself and others whom he met as members of the “New Roman School of Painting”, or nuovi pittori romani (new Roman painters). Cagli spoke of a spreading sensitivity and an Astro di Roma (Roman Star) which guided them, affirming it as the poetic basis of their art:

In a primordial dawn all has to be reconsidered, and Imagination relives all wonders and trembles for all mysteries.

Sometimes referred to as romantic expressionism, art from this group exhibits a wild painting style, expressive and disorderly, violent and with warm ochre and maroon tones. Contrary to early expressionism, the focus isn't on angst and turmoil, but rather seeing the world anew, as Cagli described, through romantic imagination. Yet, the formal rigour of the Novecento was replaced by a distinctly expressionist visionariness.

Scipione brought to life a sort of Roman baroque expressionism, where often decadent landscapes appear of Rome's historical baroque centre, populated by priests and cardinals, seen with a vigorously expressive and hallucinated eye.

Mario Mafai painted many scenes of Rome and its suburbs, and used warm chromatic colors to convey a sense of freshness and pictorial curiosity. This bent is particularly emphasised in his 1936-1939 work, in a series paintings entitled Demolitions, where in order to make a political statement he painted urban restructuring being carried out by the fascist regime. During the Second World War he painted a series of Fantasies depicting horrors committed by the fascists. Antonietta Raphaël, Mafai's wife and a sculptor, was also a member of this group.

Another member was Renato Guttuso, who like Mafai made paintings which denounced the fascist regime. Guttuso's works are generally bright, lively, and verging on abstraction.

Emanuele Cavalli and Giuseppe Capogrossi have associations both with the Scuola Romana and with Magic Realism.

== See also ==
- History of Painting
- Western Painting
