= Domenico Purificato =

Italian painter

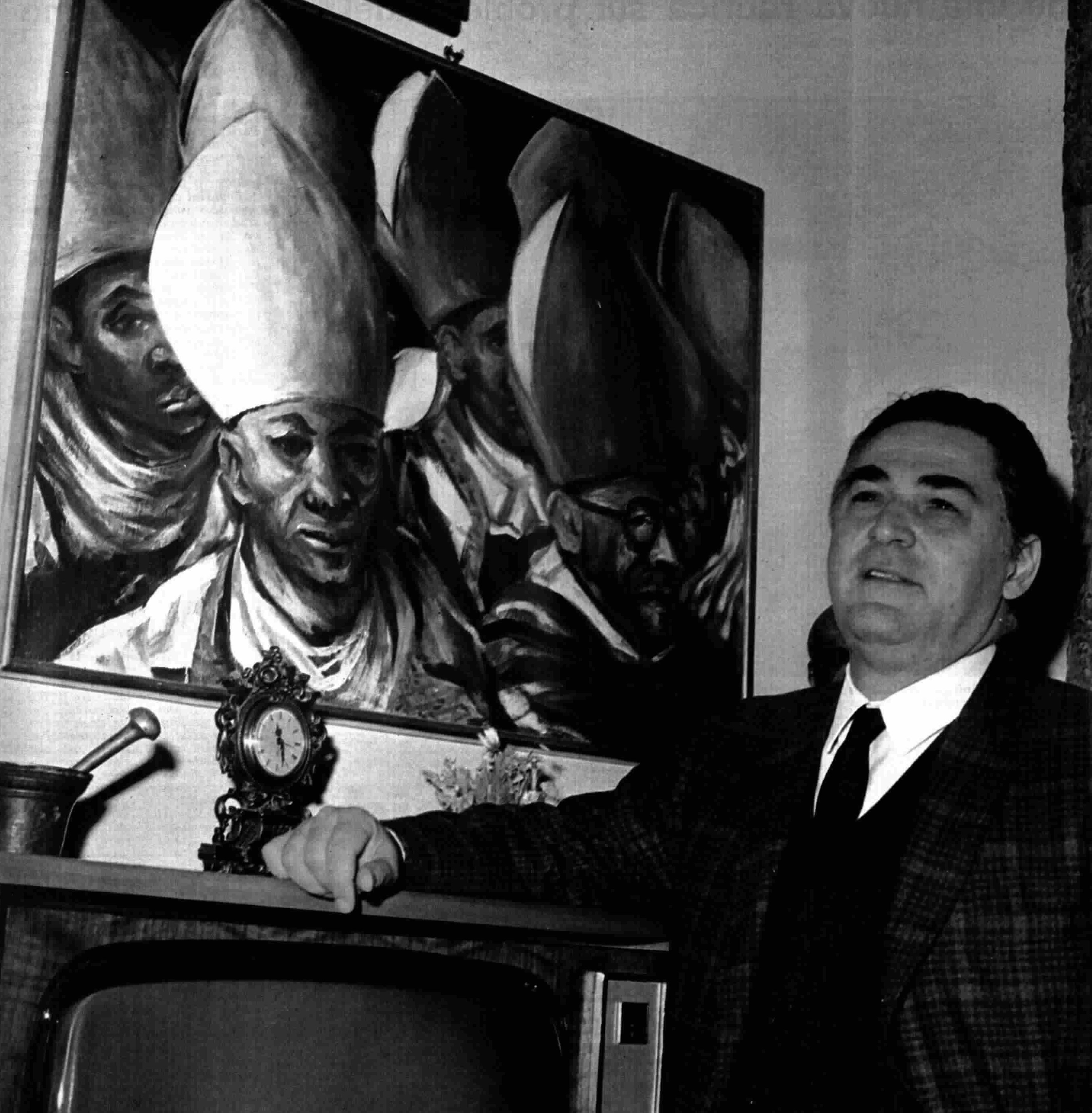
- Purificato in 1969
- Born: 14 March 1915; Fondi, Italy
- Died: 6 November 1984 (aged 69); Rome, Italy
- Occupation: Painter

Domenico Purificato (14 March 1915 – 6 November 1984) was an Italian painter, mostly associated with neo-realism. His work was part of the painting event in the art competition at the 1948 Summer Olympics.

Born in Fondi, Purificato moved to Rome in 1934 where his friend Libero de Libero introduced him to the local art scene, in particular the Scuola Romana.

In 1936 he had his first exhibition at Galleria la Cometa. From 1940 to 1943 he worked as an editor for the magazine Cinema, where he contributed a series of twelve essays on the relationship between painting and film.

In 1953 he is one of the artists involved with the first exhibition organized by the Federazione Nazionale Artisti di Roma, with artists such as Eliano Fantuzzi, Renato Guttuso, Carlo Levi, Vito Apuleio, Giuseppe Canizzaro, Nino Chillemi, Gino Franchina, Pietro Cascella, Antonietta Raphael, Antonio Sanfilippo, Joseph Strachota, Mario Mafai and others.

In 1956 he worked as production and costume designer for Giuseppe De Santis's film Giorni d'amore. Purificato's work was exhibited at the Rome Quadriennale (from 1943 through 1965) and the Venice Biennale (1948, 1952, 1954).

In 1960 he founds and edits the monthly art magazine Figura.

In 1972 he is nominated Director of the Brera Academy in Milan - a position he will keep until 1980.

Purificato died in Rome in 1984.

== Books ==
- La pittura dell'Ottocento italiano (Sciascia, Rome, 1959)
- I colori di Roma (Adriatica, Bari, 1965)
- Callimaco: una pittura per l'uomo (Trevi, Rome, 1971)
- Come leggere un quadro (Rusconi, Milan, 1985)
