= Miriam Mafai =

Italian journalist, author and politician

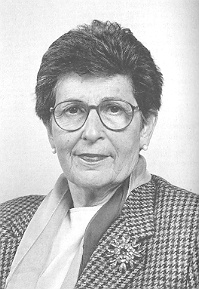
- Born: 2 February 1926; Florence, Italy
- Died: 9 April 2012 (aged 86); Rome, Italy
- Occupation: journalist

Miriam Mafai (2 February 1926 - 9 April 2012) was an Italian journalist, author and politician.

== Life and career ==
Born in Florence, the daughter of the Scuola Romana artists Mario Mafai and Antonietta Raphaël and the sister of the politician Simona and of the scenographer Giulia, Mafai grew up in Rome but Italian racial laws forced her to move first in Viareggio and later in Genoa.

During the World War II together with her sisters she joined the Italian Communist Party and after the war became a party official and served as a Councillor of the Municipality of Pescara. She debuted as a journalist in 1956, working as a reporter for the magazine Vie Nuove. After working for L'Unità she was chief editor of the feminist magazine Noi donne between 1964 and 1969. She was a co-founder of the newspaper La Repubblica, with which she collaborated until her death. She was also active as an essayist, whose favorite themes were the role of women in the society and the history of Communism. In 2004 she briefly returned to the politics, being elected to the Chamber of Deputies with Democratic Alliance.

During her career Mafai was the recipient of several accolades and honours, including the title of Grand Officer of Merit of the Italian Republic in 2003. She had a long relationship with communist politician Giancarlo Pajetta, from 1962 until his death in 1990.
