= Marino Mazzacurati =

Italian painter and sculptor

Renato Marino Mazzacurati
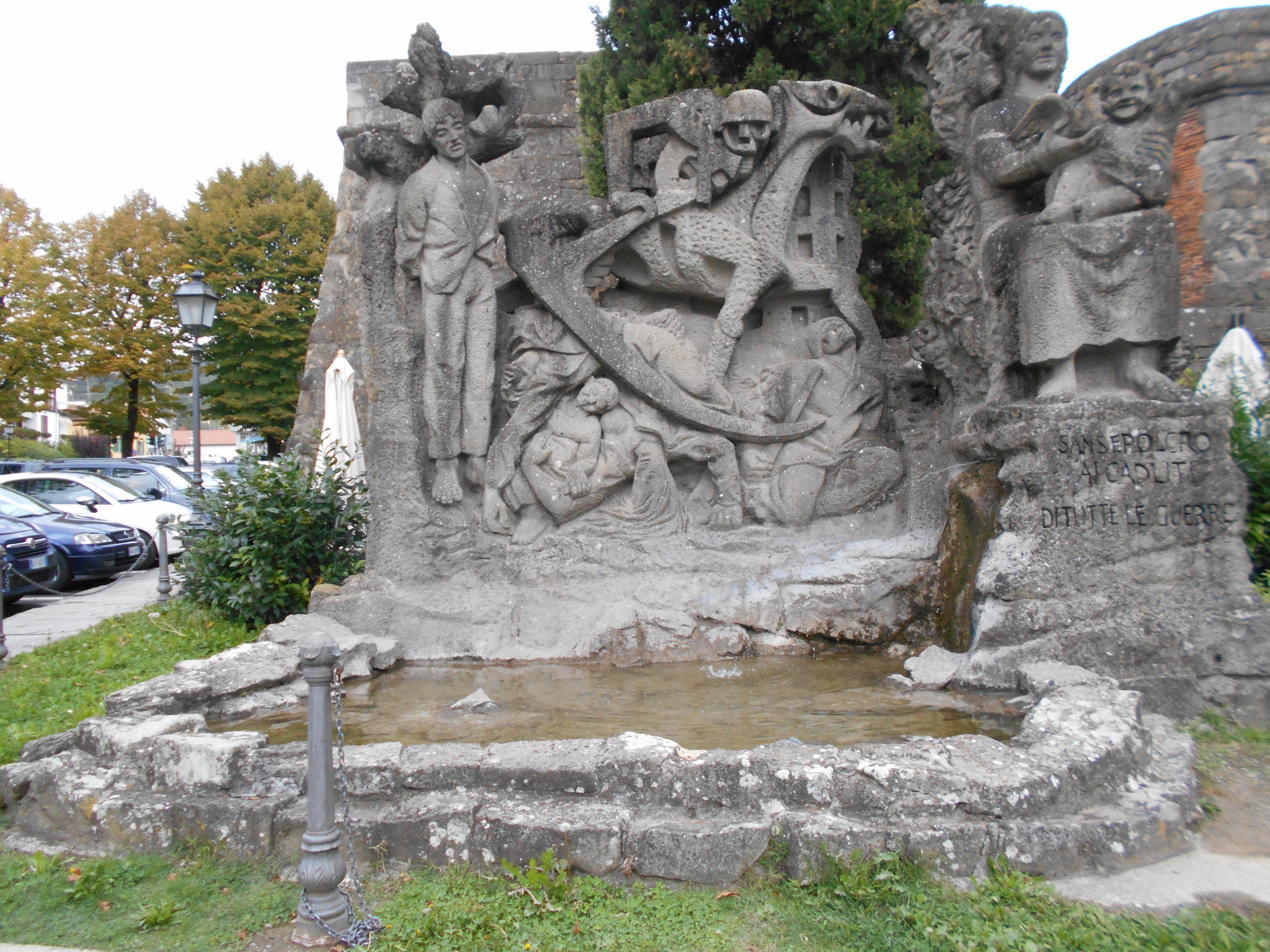
- The Fallen of All Wars monument in Sansepolcro, Arezzo, Tuscany in 2016
- Born: 22 July 1907; Galliera, Italy
- Died: 18 September 1969 (aged 62); Parma, Italy
- Education: Scuola romana
- Known for: Painting, sculpture
- Notable work: Imperatori e Imperatrici (Emperors & Empresses) Monumento al Partigiano (Monument to the Partisan); Lottatori (Wrestlers) Ritratto di Scipione (Portrait of Scipione)
- Movement: Contemporary
- Patrons: Roberto Longhi

Renato Marino Mazzacurati (22 July 1907 – 18 September 1969) was an Italian painter and sculptor belonging to the modern movement of the Scuola romana (Roman School), of eclectic styles and able within his career span to represent the artistic currents of Cubism, Expressionism, and Realism. He believed that art could sustain social functions.

== Biography ==
Moved to Rome in 1926, he befriended Scipione, Mario Mafai and Raphaël, creating with them an artistic movement called by Italian scholar Roberto Longhi the Scuola di via Cavour or Scuola Romana.

In 1931, Mazzacurati went to Paris, where he became particularly interested in the works of Rodin, Matisse and Picasso, as both his pictorial production (between 1931 and 1935) and his sculptures show. Their expressionism emphasizes the physical structure, as in Ritratto del conte N. (Portrait of Count N., 1936), or deforms it into monstrously grotesque figures – e.g., see Imperatori e Imperatrici (Emperors & Empresses, 1942–1943). Subsequently, Mazzacurati tended towards a cruder realism, joining in 1947 the "Fronte Nuovo delle Arti". His other works include Martyrs’ Monument in Beirut (1960), Monumento al Partigiano (Monumento to the Partisan) in Parma (1964) and the Monumento alle quattro giornate (Monument to the Four days of Naples) in Naples. His work was also part of the sculpture event in the art competition at the 1948 Summer Olympics.

== See also ==
- Scuola Romana
- Expressionism
- Realism (arts)
- Cubism

== Bibliography ==
- G.C. Argan, Marino Mazzacurati on "Atti dell'Accademia Nazionale di S. Luca", Rome 1965-66
- M. Maccari, Mazzacurati, catalogue, Accademia Nazionale di S. Luca, Rome 1966
- V. Martinelli, "Scipione e Mazzacurati pittore", on Studi in onore di V. Viale, Turin 1967
- Marino Mazzacurati, catalogue by the Municipality of Reggio Emilia 1983, with essays by R. De Grada, G.C. Argan, R. Guttuso, et al.
- M. De Luca, V. Mazzarella, R. Ruscio, Il Museo Marino Mazzacurati (The Mazzacurati Museum), Reggio Emilia 1995
