= Simona Mafai De Pasquale =

Italian politician (1928–2019)

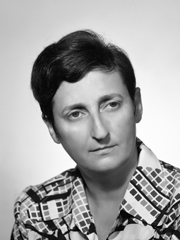
Mafai De Pasquale in 1976

Simona Mafai De Pasquale (5 July 1928 – 16 June 2019) was an Italian politician for the Communist Party (PCI). She was elected to the Senate of the Republic in 1976, serving until 1979.

== Biography ==
She was born in Rome, to painter Mario and painter/sculptor Antonietta Raphael. Mafai De Pasquale was married to Pancrazio De Pasquale, future president of the Sicilian Regional Assembly, until his death in 1992.

Mafai De Pasquale died of stroke on 16 June 2019 in Palermo, at the age of 90. She was the sister of the journalist and politician Miriam Mafai.
