= Renato Guttuso =

Italian painter and politician (1911–1987)

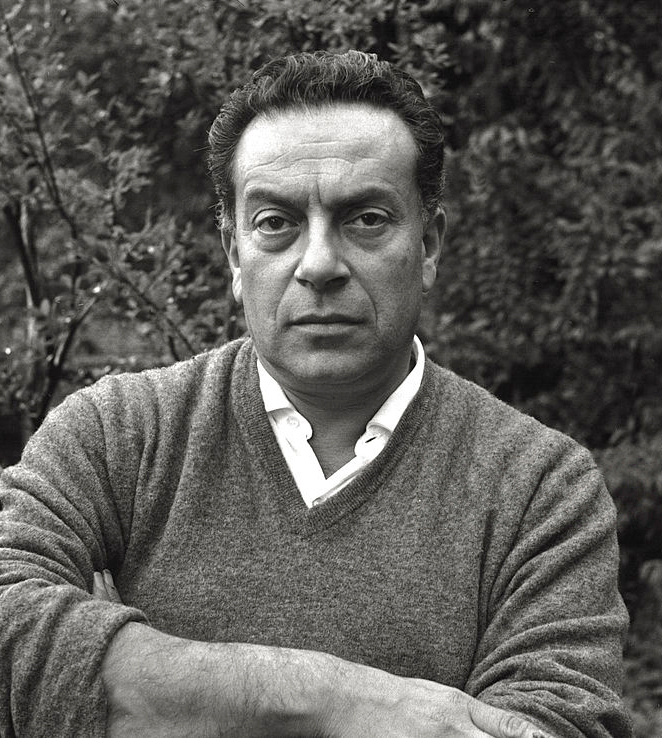

Member of the Senate of the Republic
- In office 5 July 1976 – 11 July 1983
- Constituency: Sicily (1976–1979); Apulia (1979–1983)

Personal details
- Born: Aldo Renato Guttuso; 26 December 1911 Bagheria, Italy
- Died: 18 January 1987 (aged 75) Rome, Italy
- Party: Italian Communist Party
- Education: University of Palermo
- Occupation: Painter

Aldo Renato Guttuso (26 December 1911 – 18 January 1987) was an Italian painter and politician. He is considered to be among the most important Italian artists of the 20th century and is among the key figures of Italian expressionism. His art is characterized by social and political commentary, and as a member of the Italian Communist Party (PCI) he became its senator for two legislatures, from 1976 to 1983, during Enrico Berlinguer's secretariat.

His best-known works include Flight from Etna (1938–39), Crucifixion (1941), and La Vucciria (1974). Guttuso also designed for the theatre (including sets and costumes for Histoire du Soldat, Rome, 1940) and did illustrations for books. Those for Elizabeth David’s Italian Food (1954), introduced him to many in the English-speaking world. A fierce anti-Fascist, "he developed out of expressionism and the harsh light of his native land to paint landscapes and social commentary".

== Biography ==
=== Early life ===
Guttuso was born on 26 December 1911 in Bagheria, near Palermo. He was the son of Gioacchino Guttuso, land surveyor and amateur watercolorist, and Giuseppina d'Amico. Guttuso's birth date is often incorrectly listed as 2 January 1912, as this is when Giuseppina reported his birth to the registry office.

Guttuso began signing and dating his works at the age of thirteen. They were mostly copies of nineteenth-century Sicilian landscape painters as well as French painters such as Millet and contemporary artists such as Carrà, but there were also original portraits. In 1928 he participated in his first collective exhibition in Palermo.

Guttuso lived close to a house amongst the Valguarnera villas and Palagonia, which he would soon represent in paintings inspired by the cliffs of Aspra. In Palermo and Bagheria Guttuso observed the dereliction of 18th-century villas previously belonging to the nobility, abandoned to decay as a consequence of political infighting within the municipal chambers. At the same time, his family suffered a period of economic stress because of the hostility shown by Fascists and the clergy towards his father.

Guttuso finished the Umberto I classical high school in Palermo and continued his studies at the University of Palermo, where his development was modelled according to the European figurative trends of the day, from Courbet to Van Gogh and to Picasso. In the early 1930s Guttuso was a frequent visitor to the studio of one of the most prolific futuristic painters, Pippo Rizzo. In 1929 he began contributing to newspapers and periodicals and in 1933 his first article on Picasso was targeted by Fascist censorship and caused the suspension of his contribution to the Palermo newspaper L’ora.

In 1931 two of his paintings were accepted by the jury of the Quadriennale di Roma and were included in a collective exhibition of six Sicilian painters at the Galleria del Milione, Milan, which aroused great interest among the Milanese artistic milieu. The paintings were acclaimed by critic Franco Grasso as a "disclosure, a Sicilian affirmation".

Back in Palermo Guttuso opened a studio in Pisani street and together with painter Lia Pasqualino and sculptors Barbera and Nino Franchina formed the Gruppo dei Quattro (The Group of Four).

=== Social art and the Second World War ===
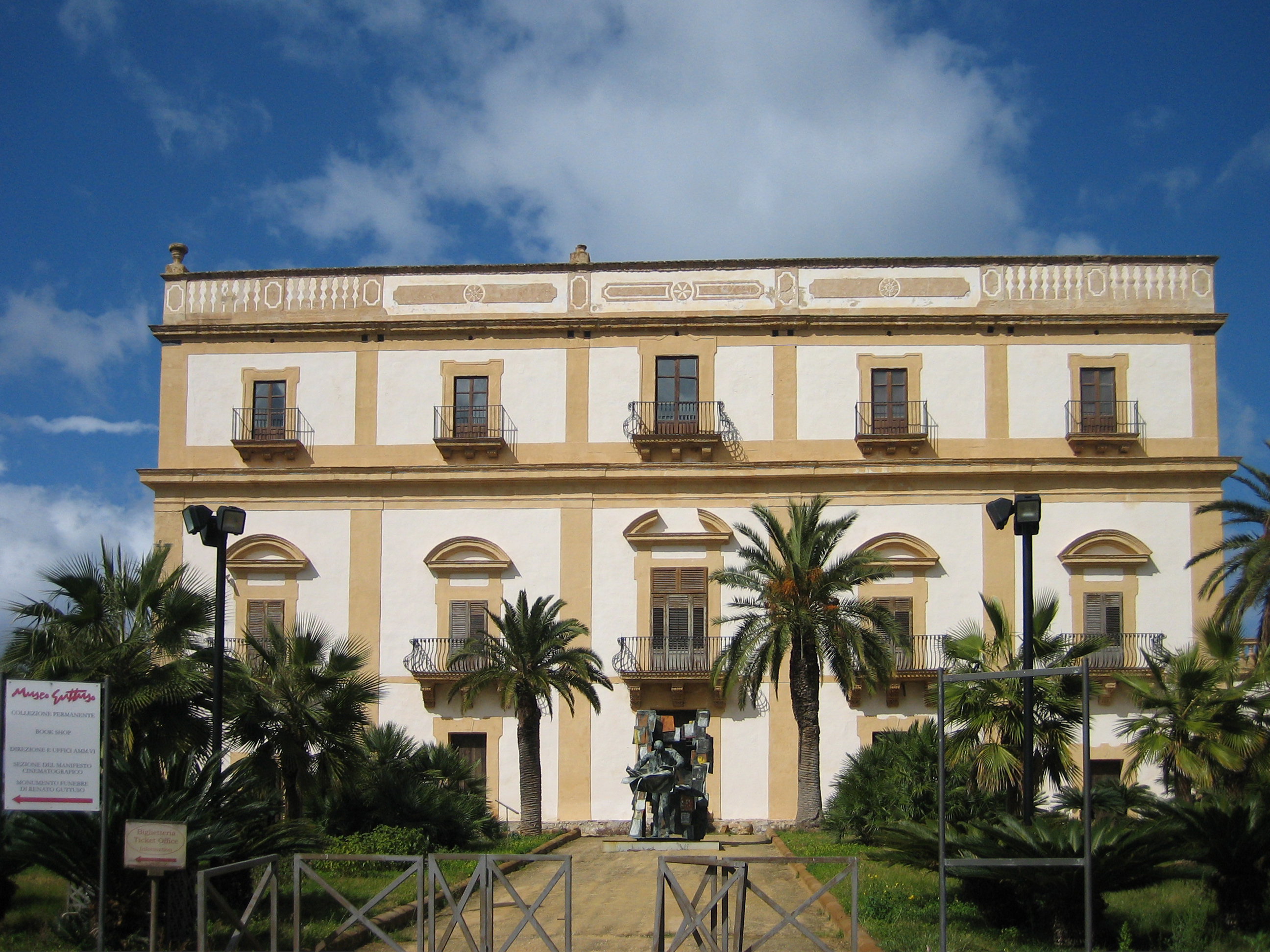
The Museum of Renato Guttuso in Bagheria

In 1937 Guttuso moved to Rome and opened his first studio in Piazza Melozzo.

Due to his exuberant lifestyle, his friend Marino Mazzacurati nicknamed him "Unbridled Guttuso". He lived close to significant artists of the time: Mario Mafai, Corrado Cagli, Antonello Trombadori, also keeping in contact with the group from Milan of Giacomo Manzù and Aligi Sassu.

Having rejected every academic canon, Guttuso joined the Corrente movement and wrote for Corrente di Vita in Milan. The movement was characterized by its strong opposition to Fascist rule and its influence on culture. Here he developed his "social" art, with his political attitudes evident in paintings such as Fucilazione in Campagna (1938) and Escape from Etna, the former dedicated to the poet Federico García Lorca, who had been shot by Franco's supporters during the Spanish Civil War.

Guttuso continued painting during World War II, with his work ranging from landscape glimpses of the Gulf of Palermo to a collection of drawings entitled Massacri ("Massacres"), which implicitly denounced slaughters such as the Adreatine massacre. In 1940 he joined the clandestine Italian Communist Party and briefly took refuge in Genova, later returning to Rome.

Crocifissione ("Crucifixion"), painted in 1940, is the painting for which he is best remembered and which earned him the second prize in the fourth Bergamo Prize in 1942. At the time it was derided by the clergy, who labelled Guttuso a "pictor diabolicus" ("devilish painter"). The Fascists also denounced it for depicting the horrors of war through the lens of religion. Guttuso wrote in his diary: "this is a time of war. I wish to paint the torment of Christ as a contemporary scene... as a symbol of all those who, because of their ideas, endure outrage, imprisonment and torment". He became an active participant in the partisan struggle in 1943.

After the war, in 1945, Guttuso, along with artists Birolli, Marchiori, Vedova and others, founded the Fronte Nuovo delle Arti (New Arts Front) as a vessel for the promotion of the work of those artists who had previously been bound by Fascist rule. He also collaborated on the magazine Il Calendario del Popolo, established the same year. During this time he also met and befriended Pablo Picasso. Their friendship would last until Picasso's death in 1973. Socio-political themes dominated Guttuso's work during this time, depicting the day-to-day lives of peasants and blue-collar workers.

=== Later life and career ===
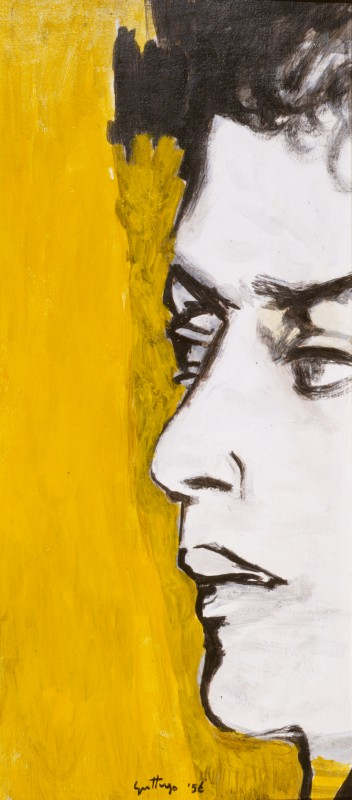
Profilo (1956), Art collection of Fondazione Cariplo

Guttuso finished Muratori in riposo ("Builders resting"), an artwork in china ink and watercolour that he had started during the war, a symbol of rebirth of which Pier Paolo Pasolini wrote in 1962:

The shapes of ten workers
emerge white over white masonry
the noon is that of the summer.
But the humiliated flesh
projects a shadow; is the disarranged order
of the white colors, that is faithfully followed
by the black ones. The noon is a peaceful one.

In the following years Guttuso painted Contadino che zappa (1947) and Contadini di Sicilia (ten drawings published in Rome in 1951), in which his pictorial language became clear and free of all superfluous elements. Guttuso wrote that these were preparatory sketches for his 1949 painting Occupazione delle terre incolte in Sicilia ("Occupation of uncultivated lands of Sicily"), exhibited at the Venice Biennale in 1950. He asserted:

I believe that these are legacies to my deeper and remote inspiration. To my childhood, to my people, my peasants, my father land-surveyor, the garden of lemons and oranges, to the gardens of the latitude familiar to my eye and my feeling, where I was born. Sicilian peasants who hold the primary position in my heart, because I am one of them, whose faces come in front of my eyes no matter what I do, Sicilian peasants so important in the history of Italy.

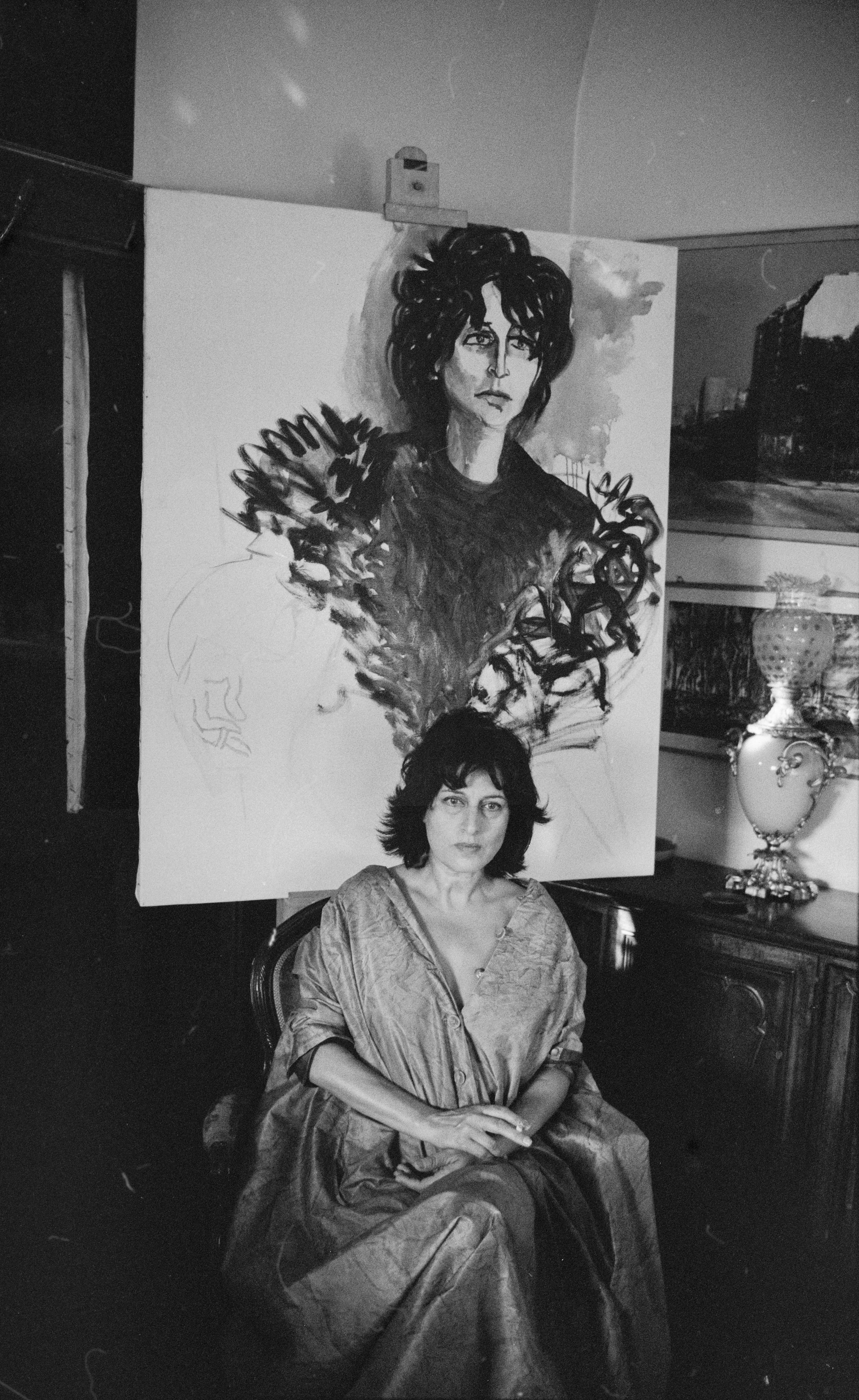
Actress Anna Magnani modelling for her portrait (1961)

In 1950 Guttuso joined the project of the Verzocchi collection (in the civic Pinacoteca of Forlì), sending a self-portrait, and the works "Sicilian labourer", "Bagheria on the Gulf of Palermo" and "Battle of the Bridge of the Admiral". In the latter, he depicted his grandfather Ciro as a Garibaldine soldier. Guttuso also painted a series from life about the fight of the peasants for occupied lands, the sulfur miners, or glimpses of landscape between cactus and prickly pears, as well as portraits of men from contemporary culture such as Nino Garajo and Bruno Caruso.

In 1953 he participated in the First Trade Union Exhibition of the Roman Provincial Union belonging to the National Federation of Artists of Rome in Via Margutta 54, together with artists such as Antonio Vangelli, Carlo Levi, Pietro Cascella, Corrado Cagli, Carla Accardi, Ugo Attardi, Domenico Purificato and others. In 1956 Guttuso married Mimise Dotti. Poet Pablo Neruda was a witness at their wedding. Mimise would become his confidant and model.

Fascinated by Dante's model, between 1959 and 1961, Guttuso made a series of colour drawings published in 1970 as Il Dante di Guttuso, in which the characters of Hell are revisited as exemplars of human history, confirming the versatility of his talent. Between 1963 and 1964 his paintings were shown at the Peintures italiennes d'aujourd'hui exhibition, organized in the Middle East and North Africa.

In the late 1960s and 1970s, he completed a suite of paintings devoted to the feminine figure, a motif that became as dominant in his painting. Donne stanze paesaggi, oggetti (1967) was followed by a series of portraits of Marta Marzotto, his favourite muse of many years. Famous pieces include the Cartoline, a set of 37 drawings and mixed techniques (published by the Archinto publishing house in the volume Le Cartoline di Renato Guttuso), in which the artist depicted his memories and feelings towards Marzotto.

In 1971 he designed the banner for that year's Palio di Siena. In 1972 he painted I funerali di Togliatti ("The Funeral of Togliatti"), preserved at the Museum of Modern Art in Bologna. In it, various communist figures (most of whom were already dead at the time of Palmiro Togliatti's funeral in 1964) are depicted in an allegorical manner in order to create an ideal representation of the collective communist imagination of the 20th century. In addition to Guttuso himself, Marx, Engels, Trotsky, Elio Vittorini, Angela Davis, Stalin, Lenin, Jean-Paul Sartre, Simone de Beauvoir, Pier Paolo Pasolini and others are also depicted.

His most famous "palermitano" painting is 1974's Vucciria di Palermo ("Palermo market"), in which, with raw and bloody realism, he expressed one of the many spirits of the Sicilian city.

Emblem of the PCI, designed by Guttuso

=== Political career ===
In 1950, he was given the World Peace Council Prize in Warsaw. In 1972 he received the Lenin Peace Prize.

In the political elections of 20 June 1976 he was elected to the Senate of the Republic for the Italian Communist Party (PCI) in the Sciacca constituency, having received 29,897 votes.

He was also confirmed in the political elections of 3 June 1979 in the Senate of the Republic for the PCI in the Lucera constituency with 29,418 votes.

=== Death ===
Mimise Dotti-Guttuso died on 6 October 1986. Guttuso was soon to follow his wife. He died in Rome of lung cancer at the age of 75 on 18 January 1987. On his deathbed, he allegedly embraced Christianity, of which he had been critical of his entire life. Marta Marzotto, in an interview, claimed that Guttuso had always been an atheist. He donated many of his works to his hometown Bagheria, which are now housed in the museum of the Villa Cattolica. His tomb is the work of the sculptor Giacomo Manzù.

After speculation about who would be the rightful owner of the painter's work, two prosecutors were appointed to settle the dispute between Guttuso's nephew, his adopted son Fabio Carapezza Guttuso (who had been adopted only four months before Renato's death, was 32 years old and was already recognized as the son of Marcello Carapezza), his longtime lady friend Marta Marzotto, Rome's Museum of Modern Art, along with an assortment of other slighted acquaintances to high-ranking government and church officials. Fabio Carapezza Guttuso was the sole heir to Guttuso's work. According to Peter Robb's Midnight in Sicily, Carapezza was investigated by the public prosecutor's office, suspected of exploiting a person of unsound mind.

== Gallery ==
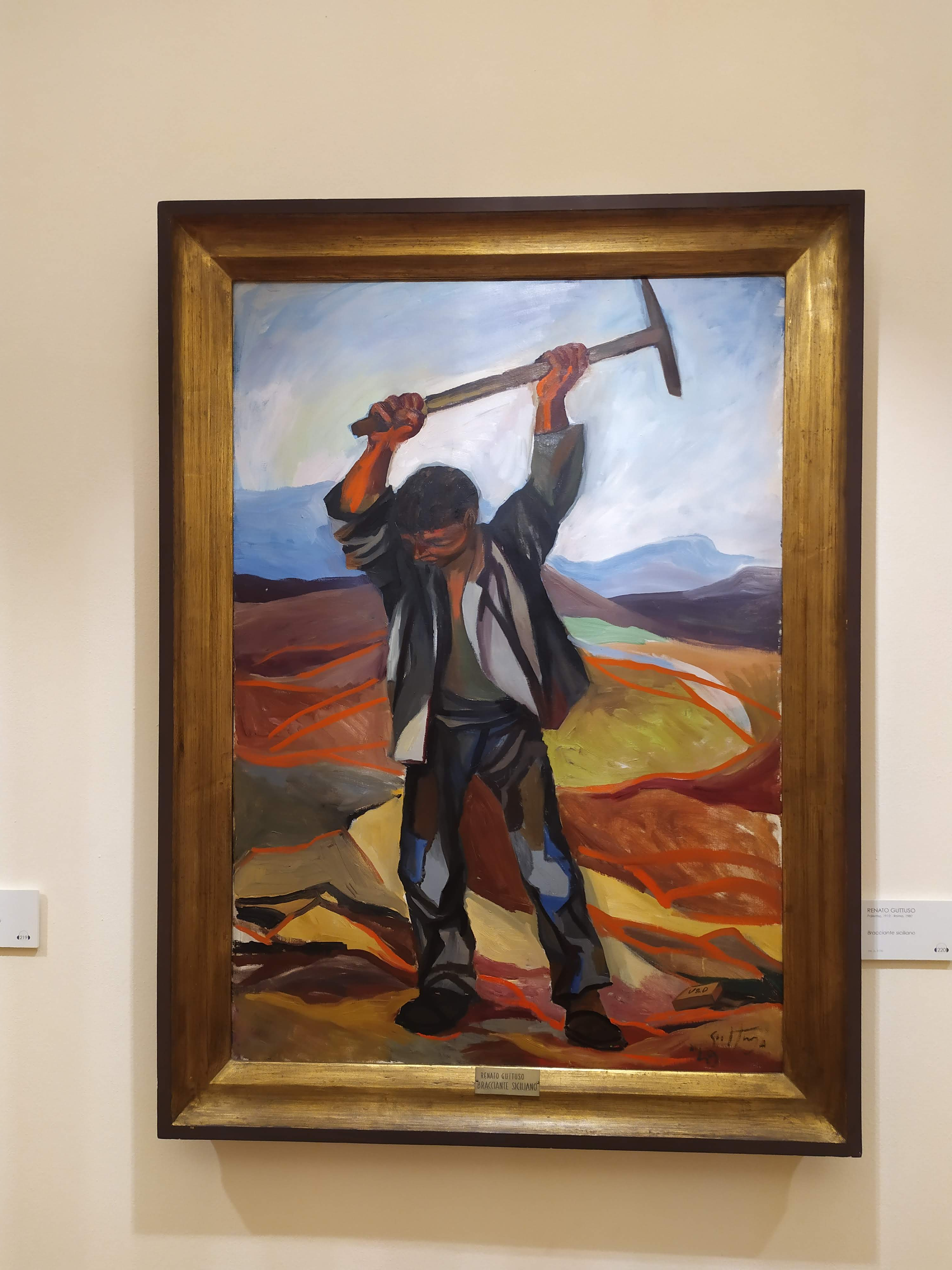
Sicilian labourer (1949)

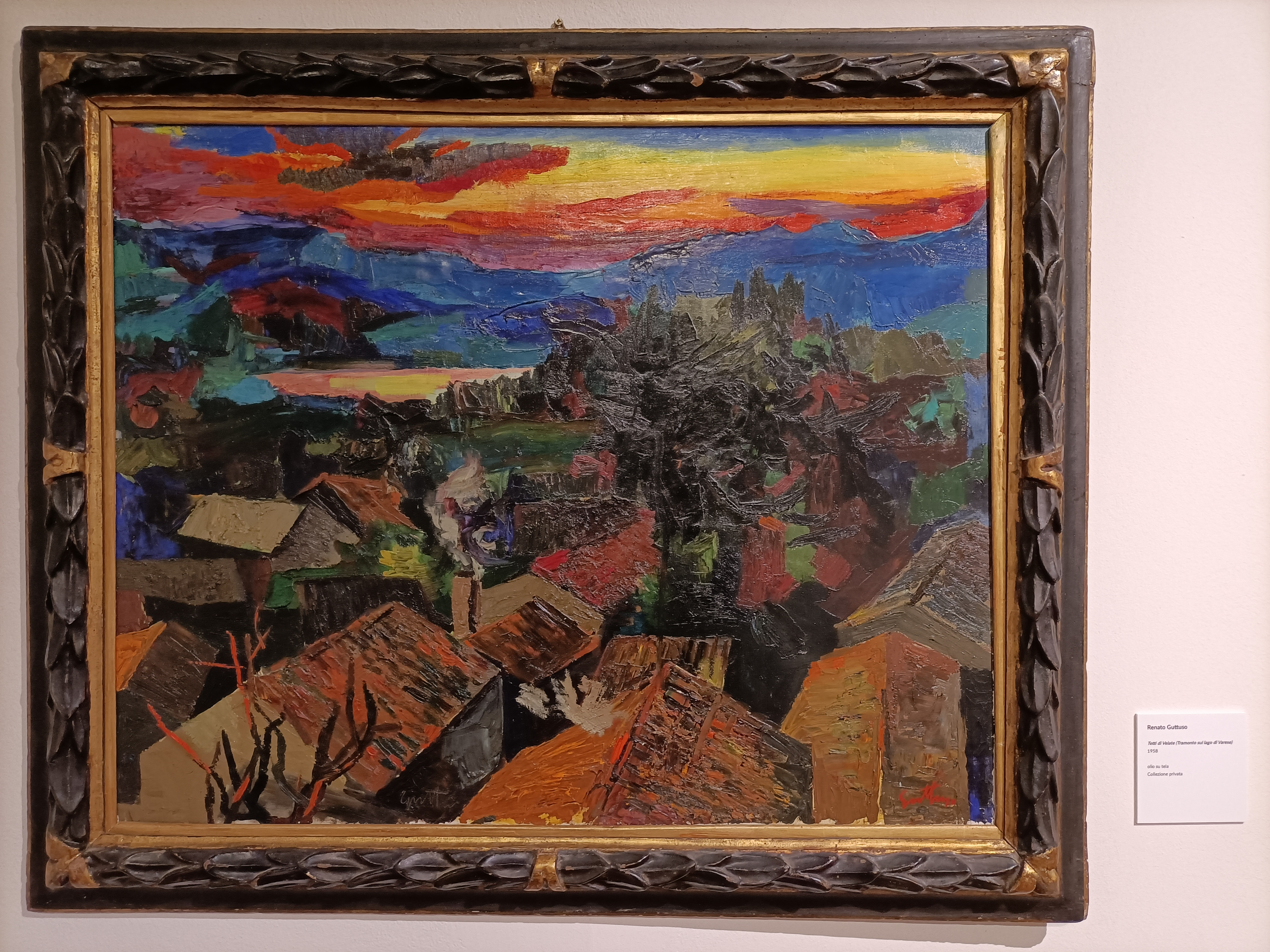
Sunset on Lake Varese (1958)

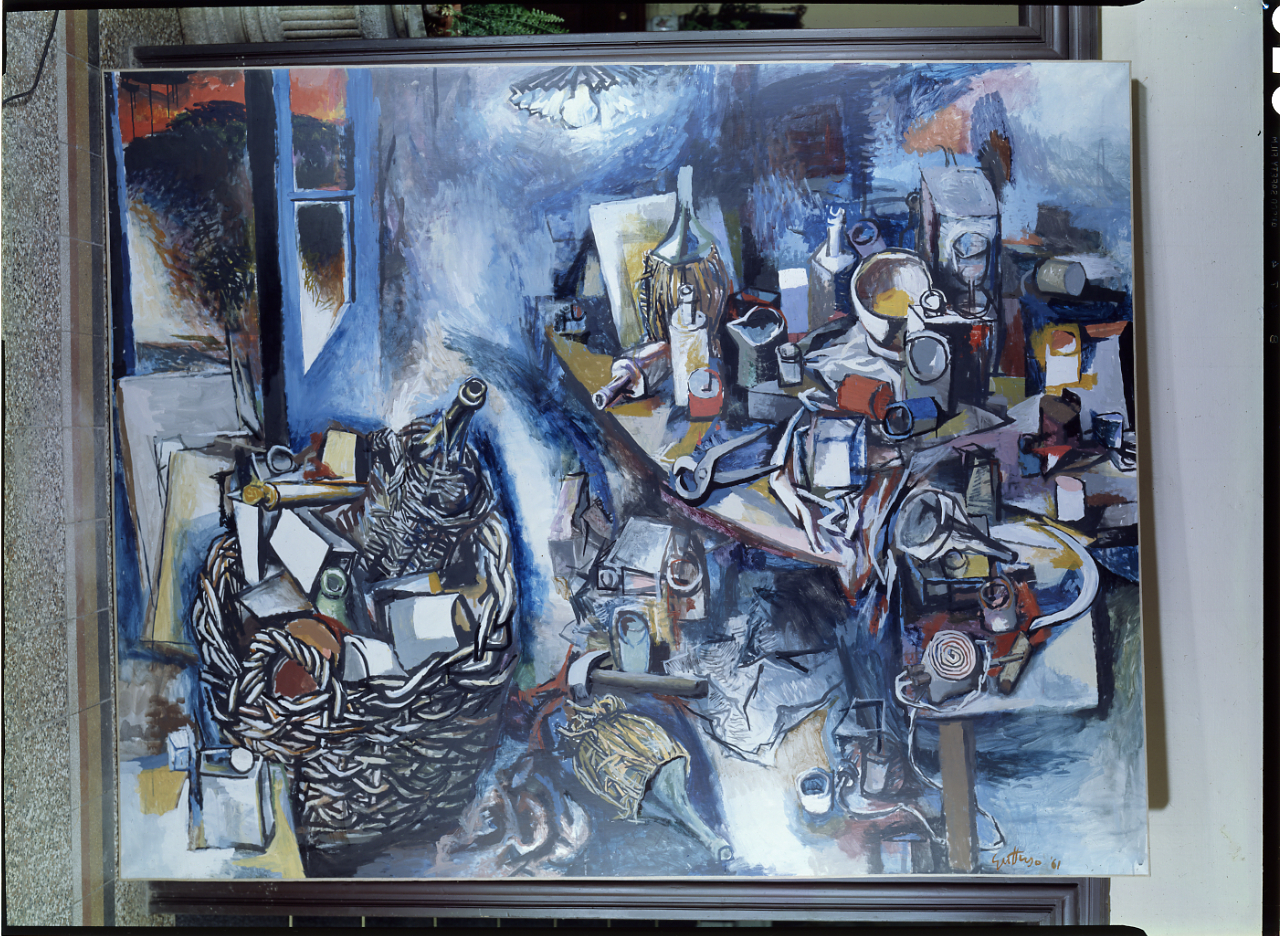
Still Life in the Studio (1962)
Photos by Paolo Monti, 1961-1969

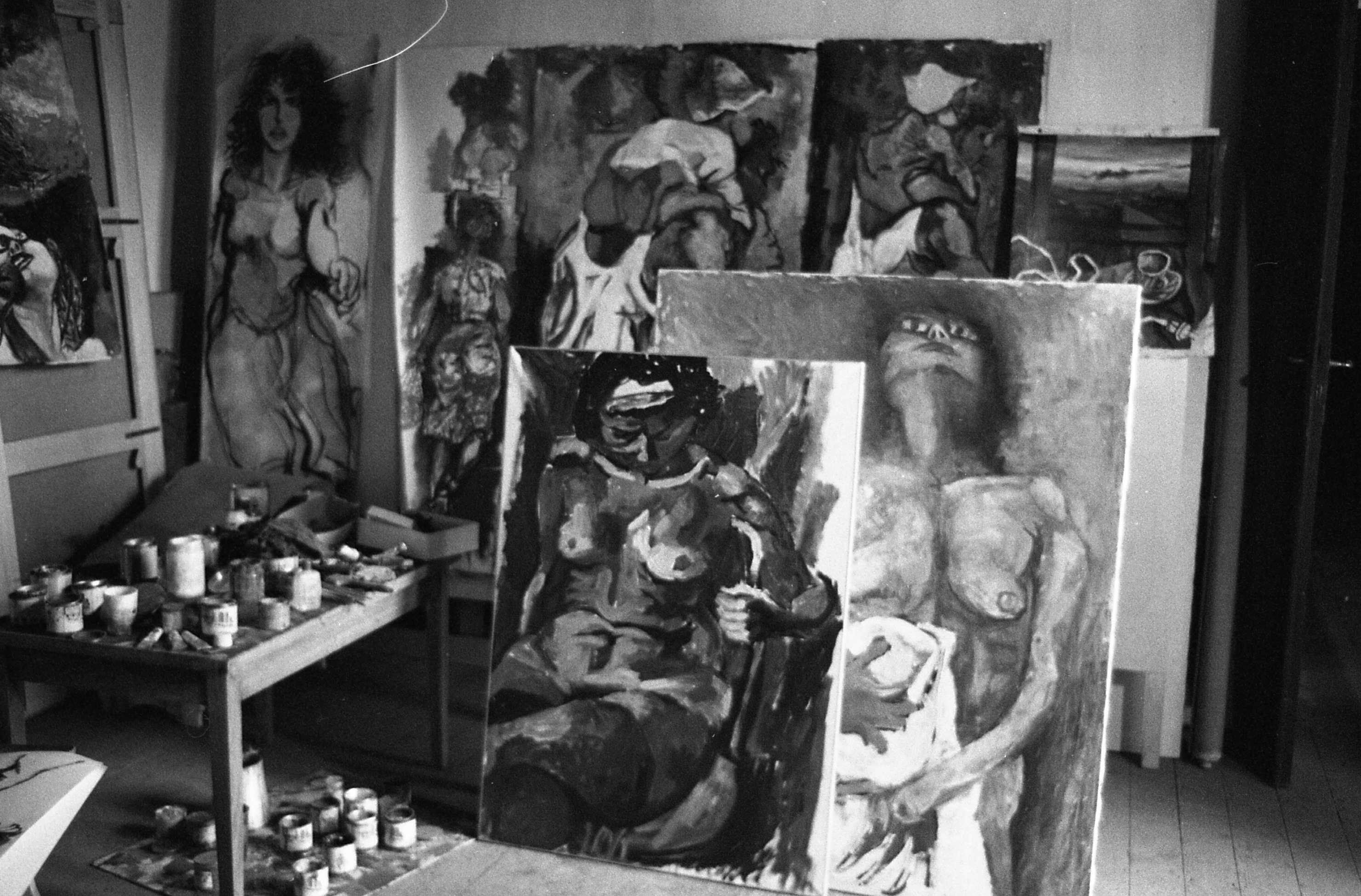

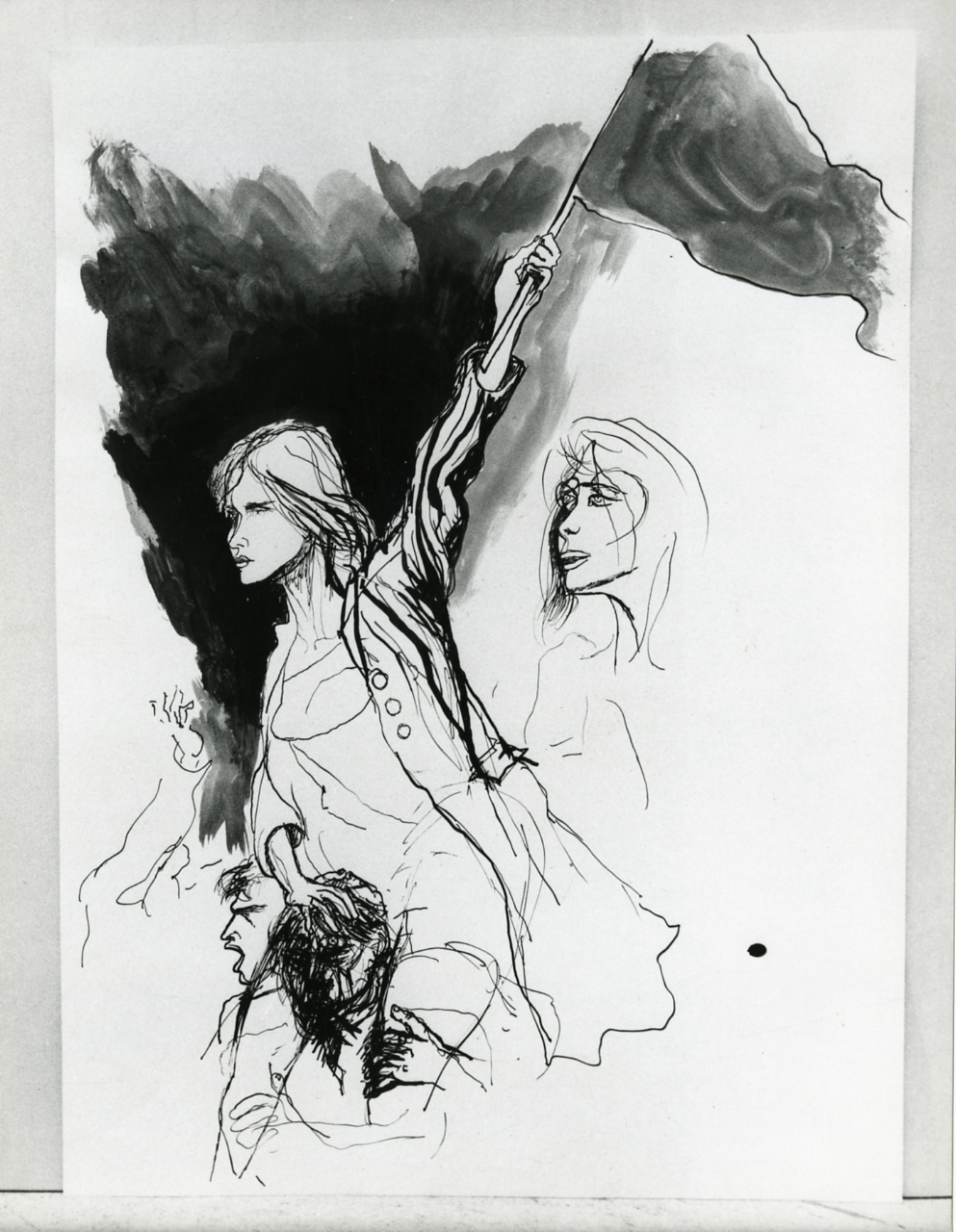

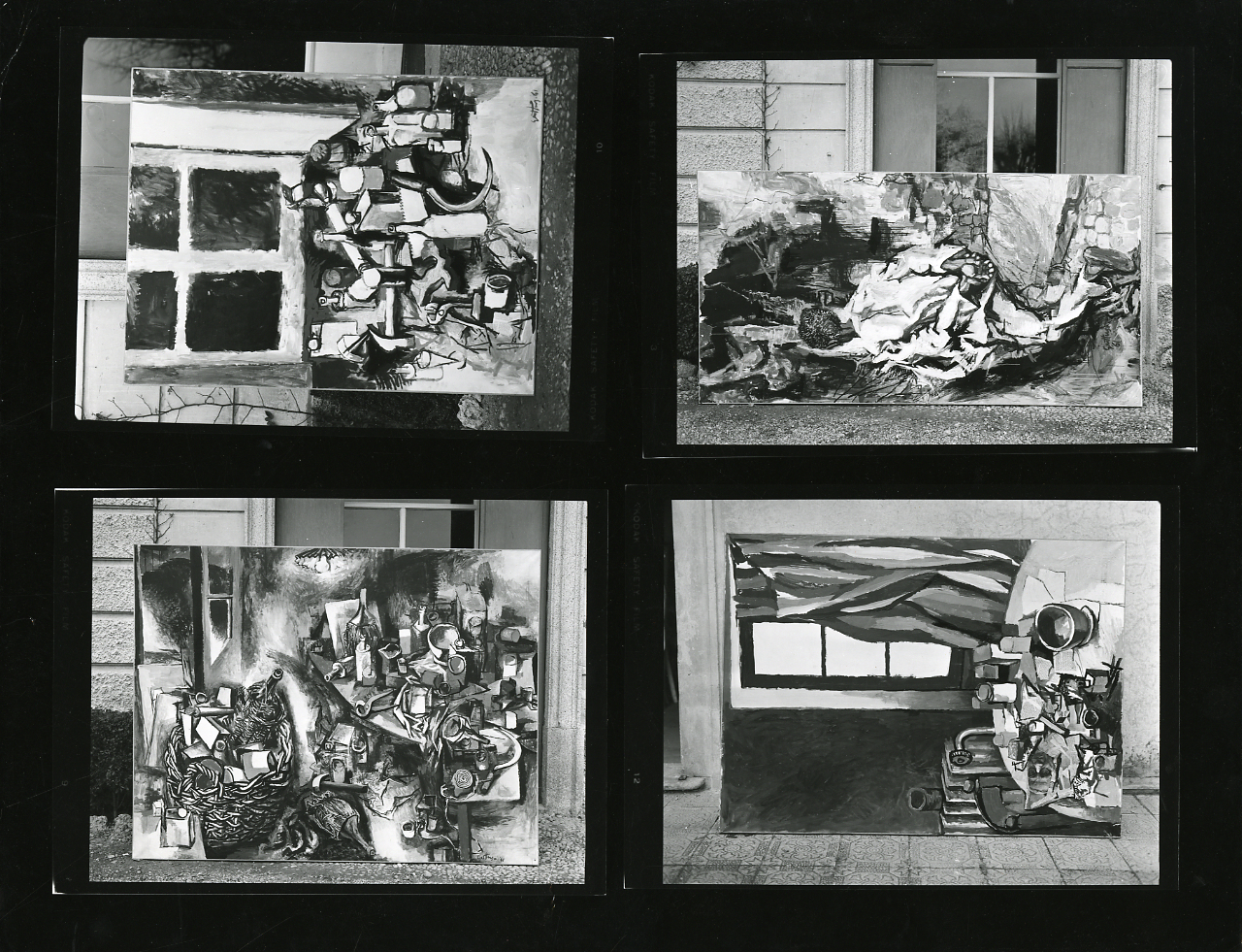

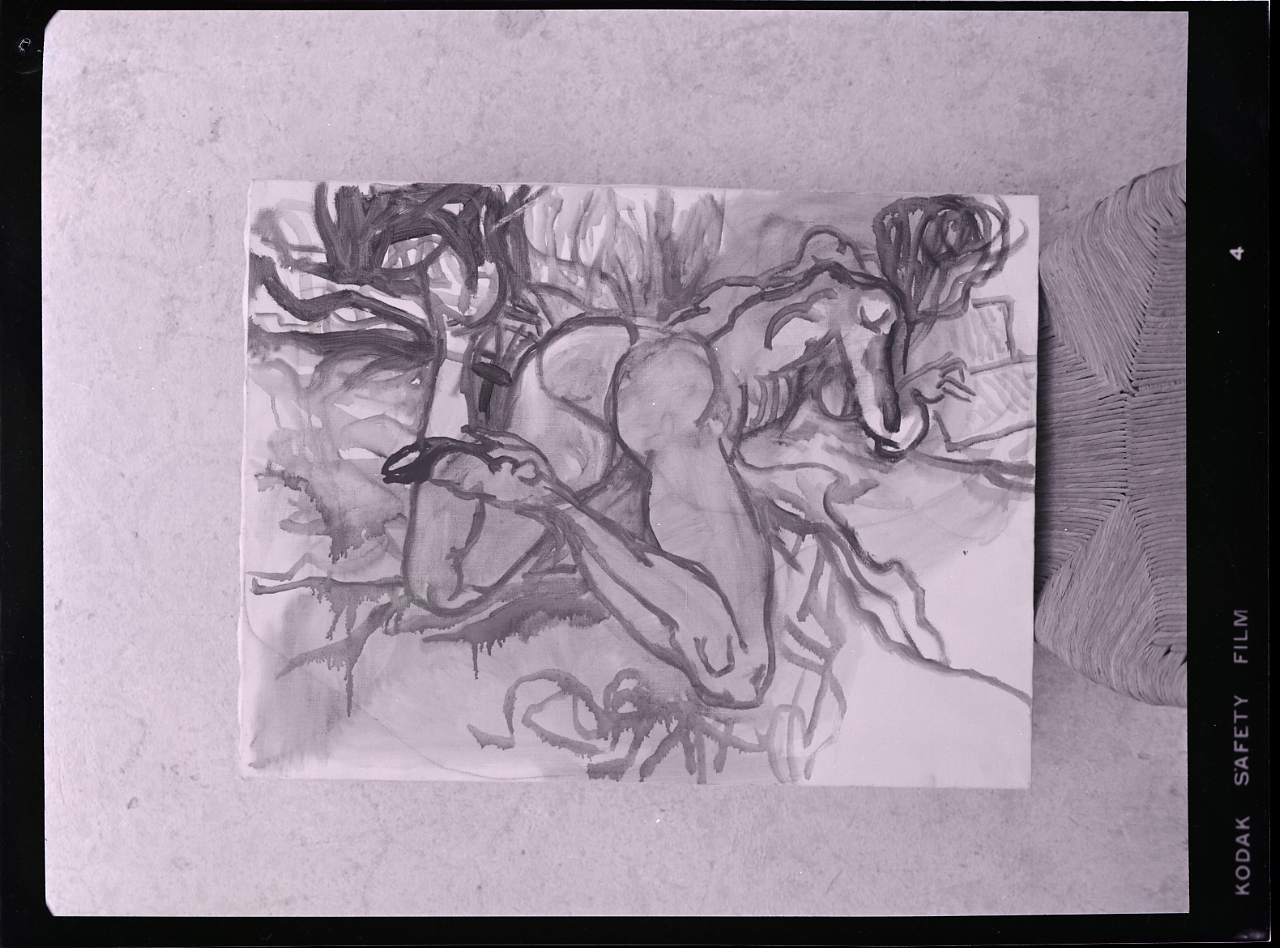

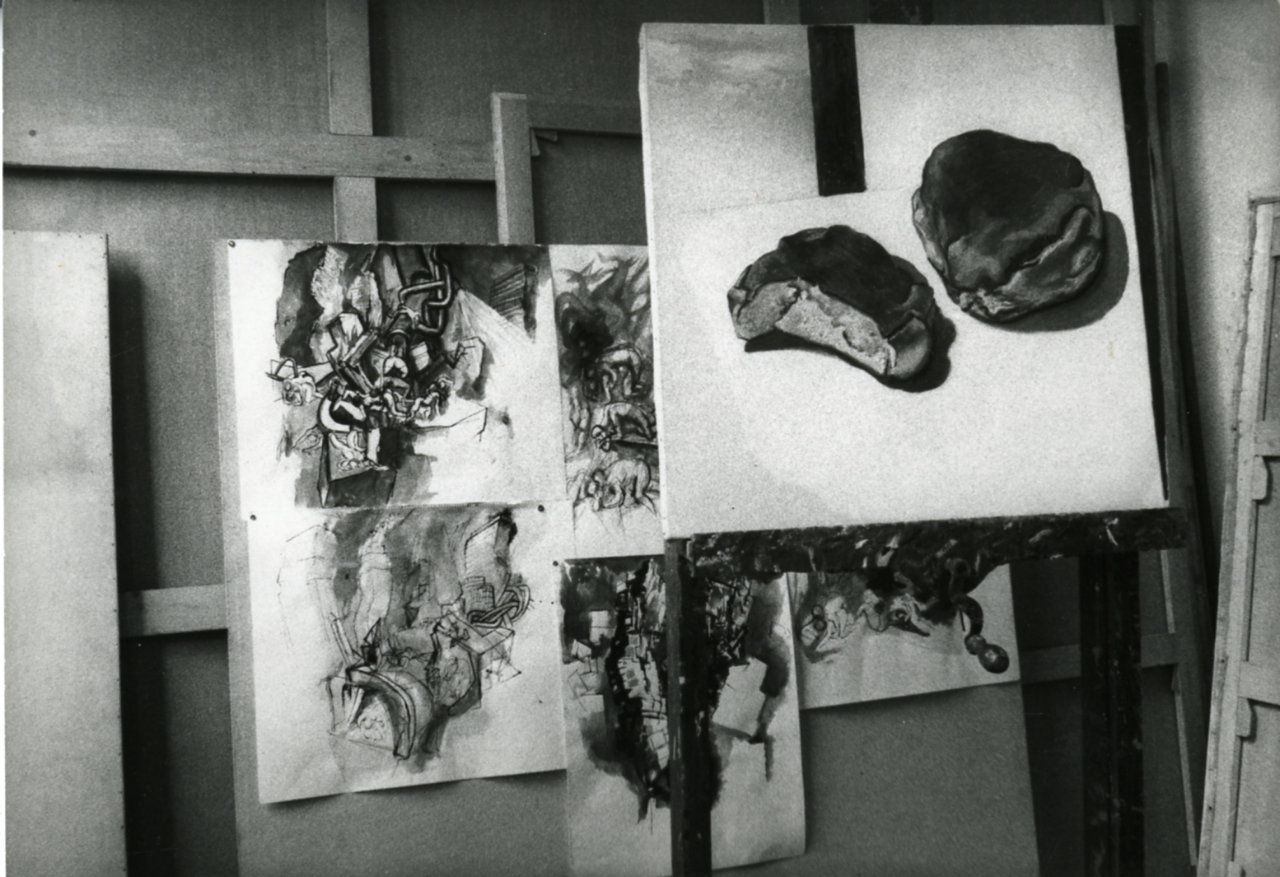

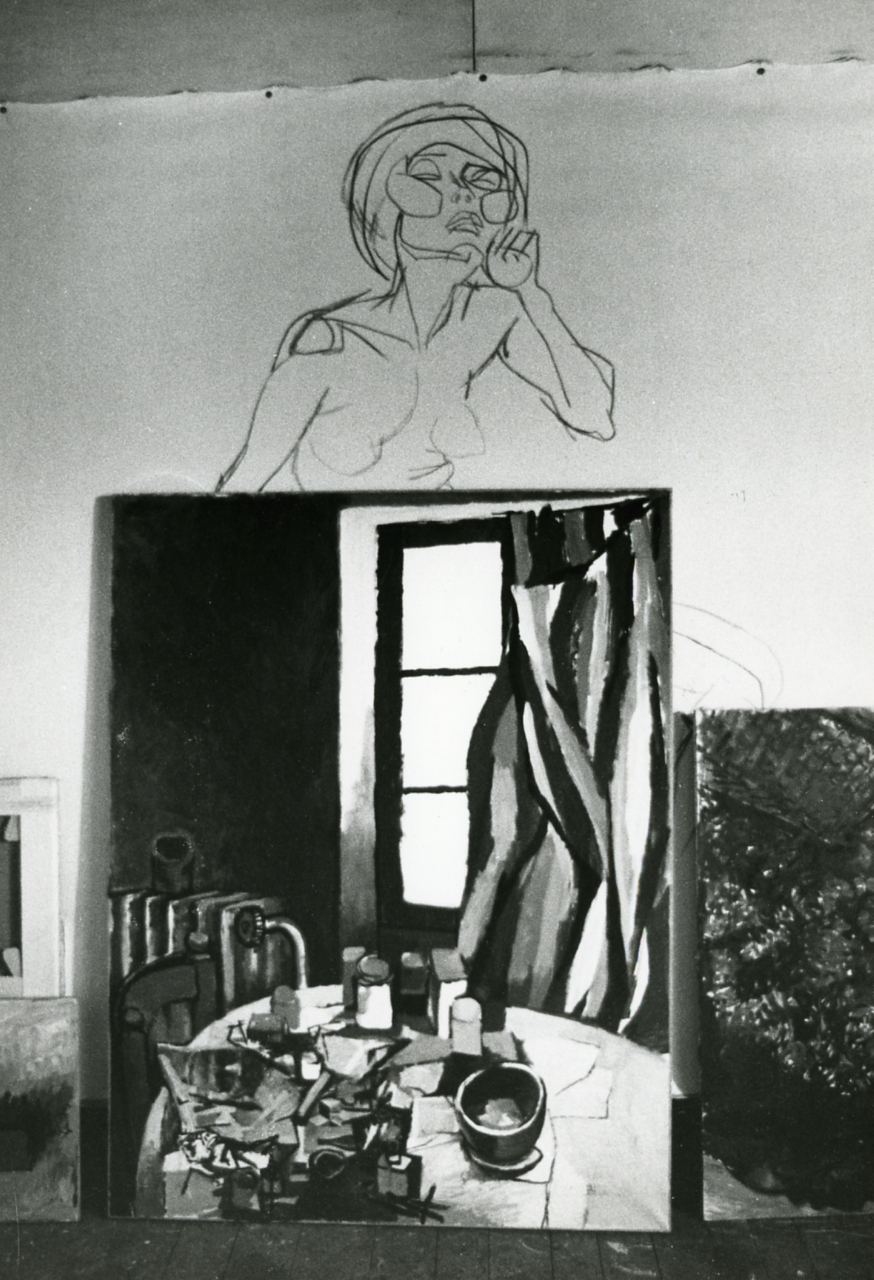

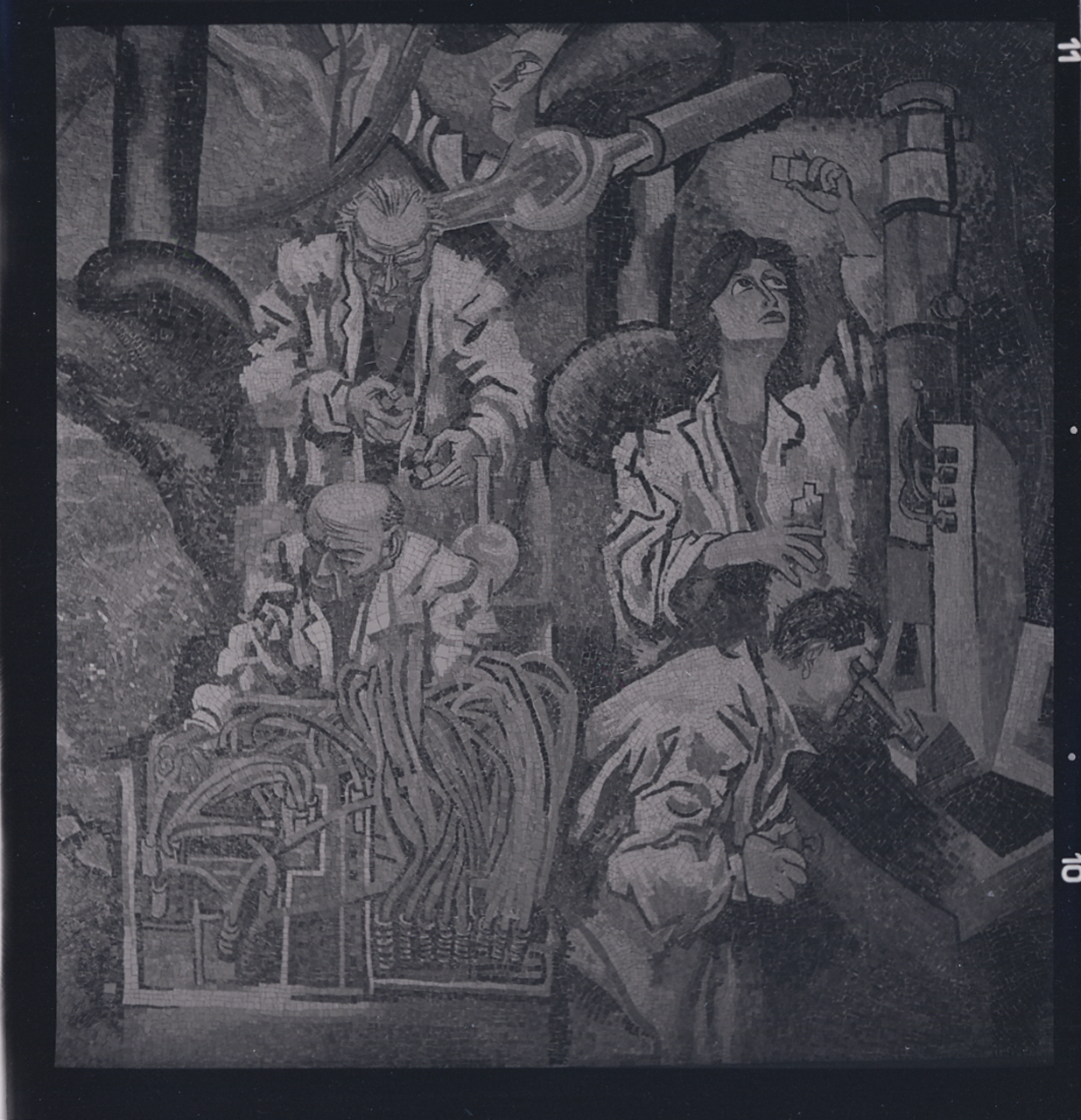

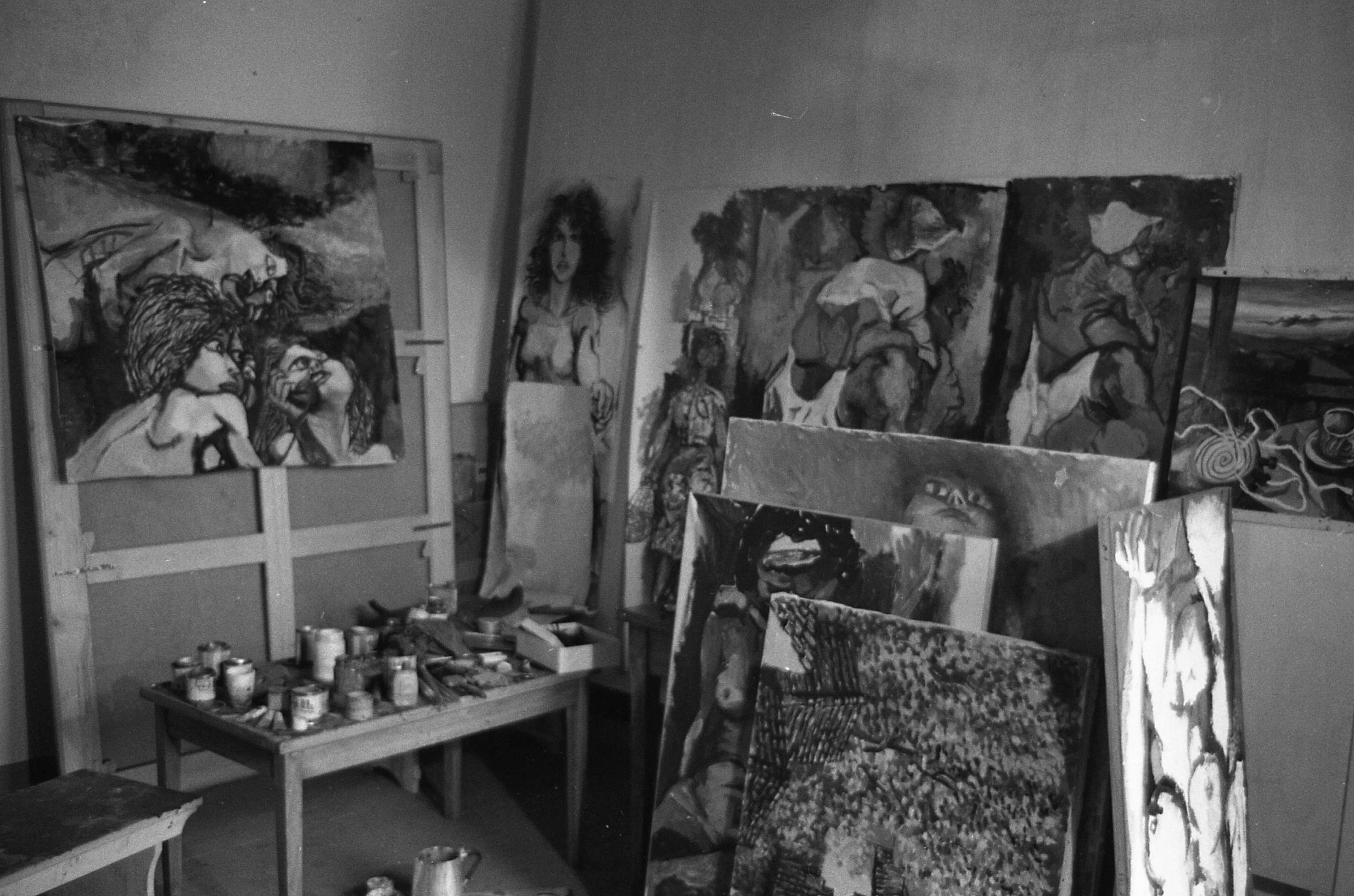

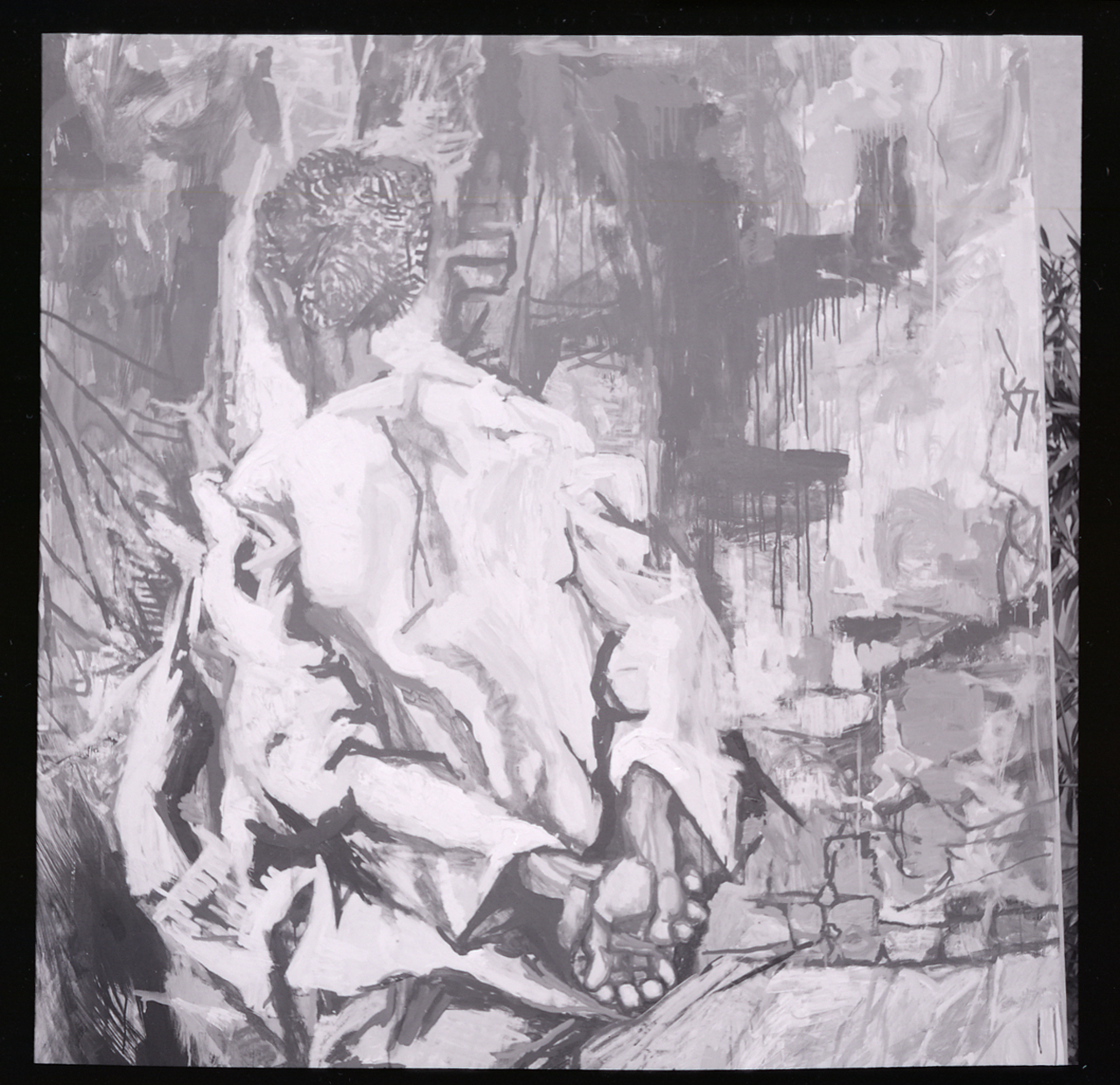

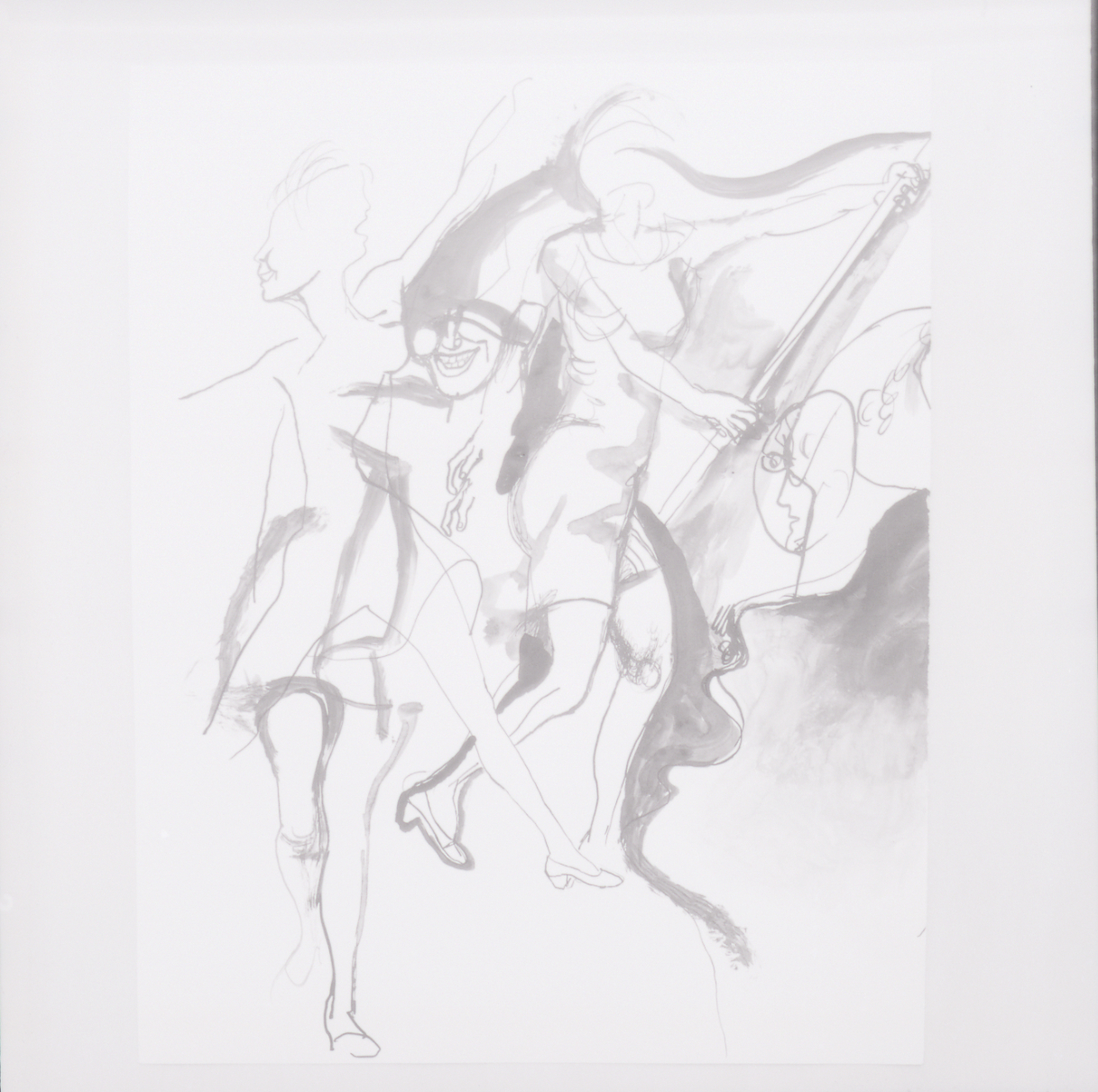

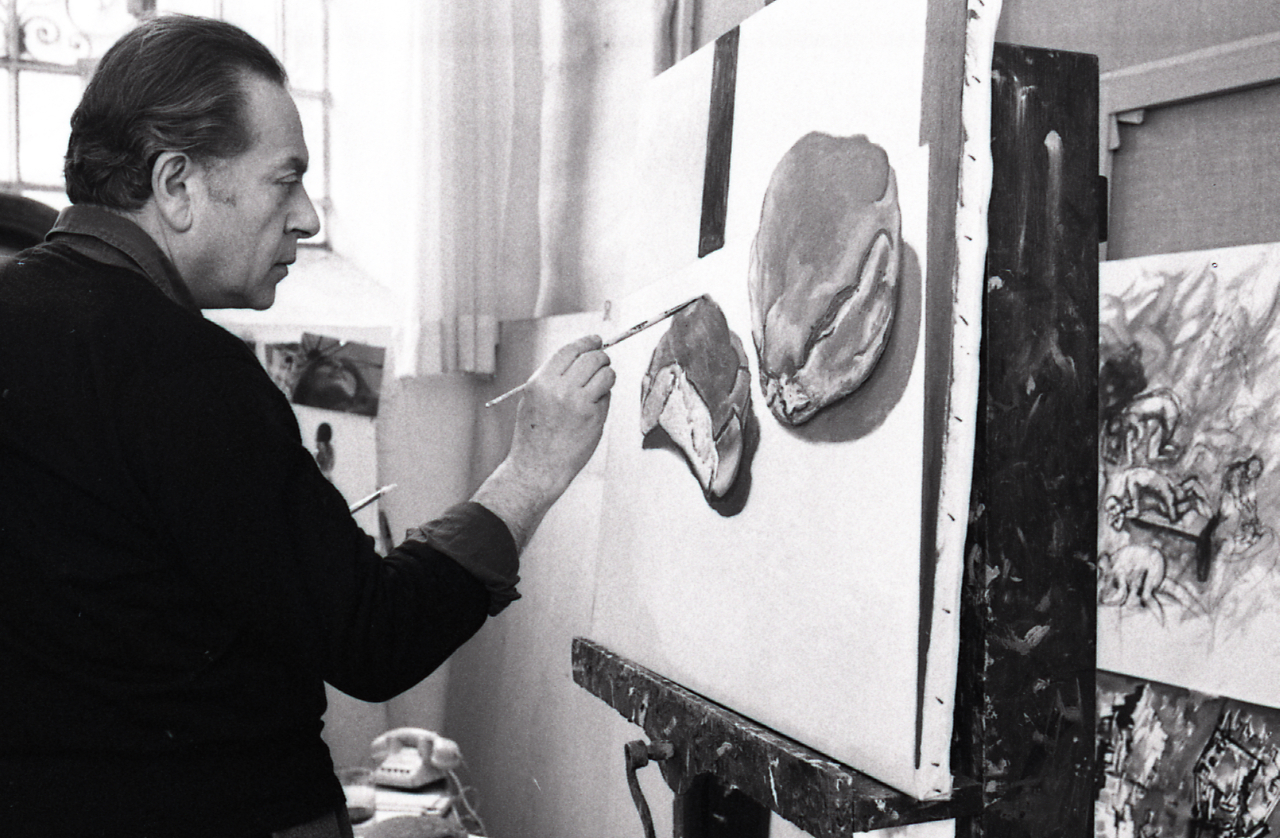

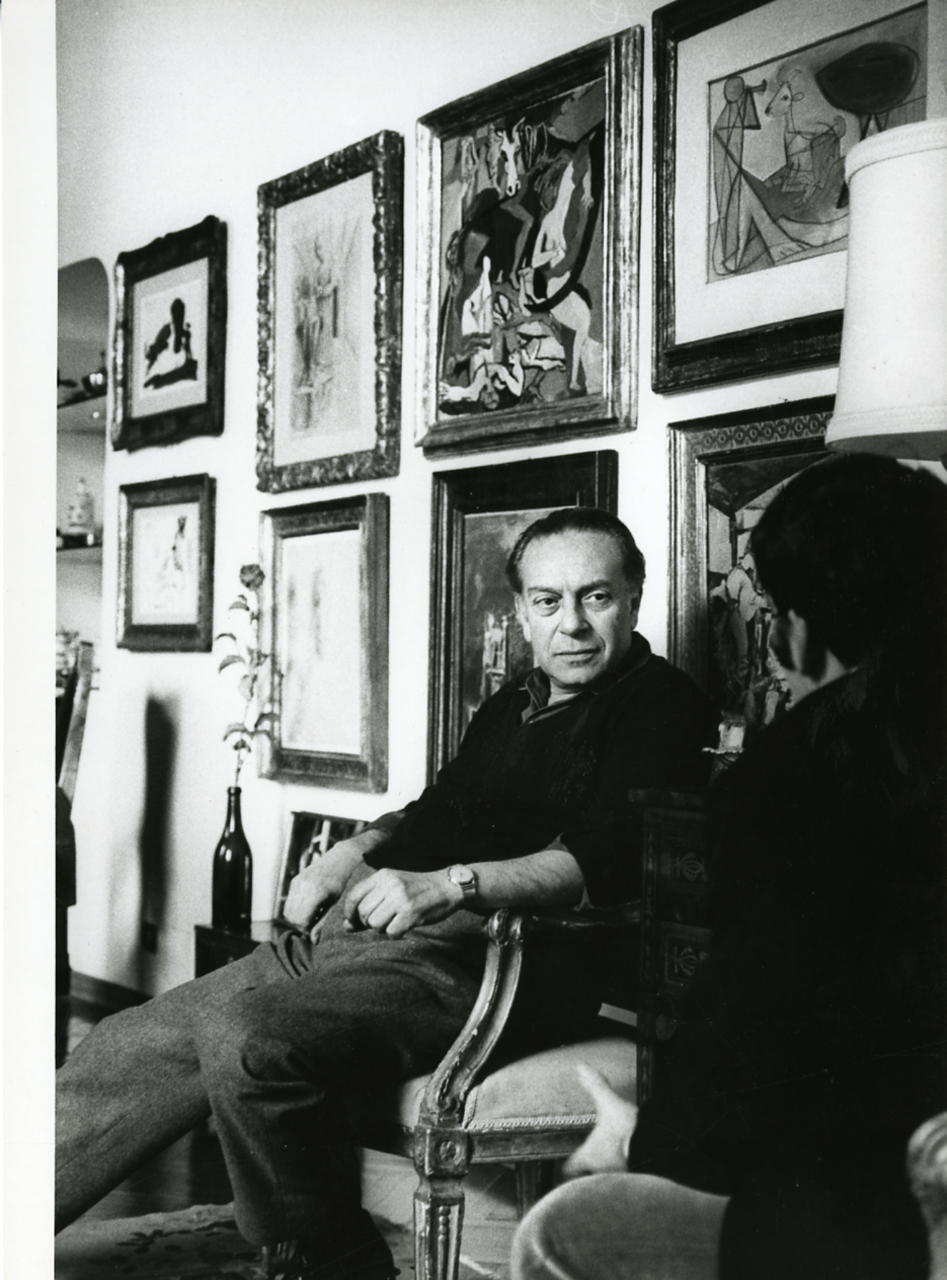

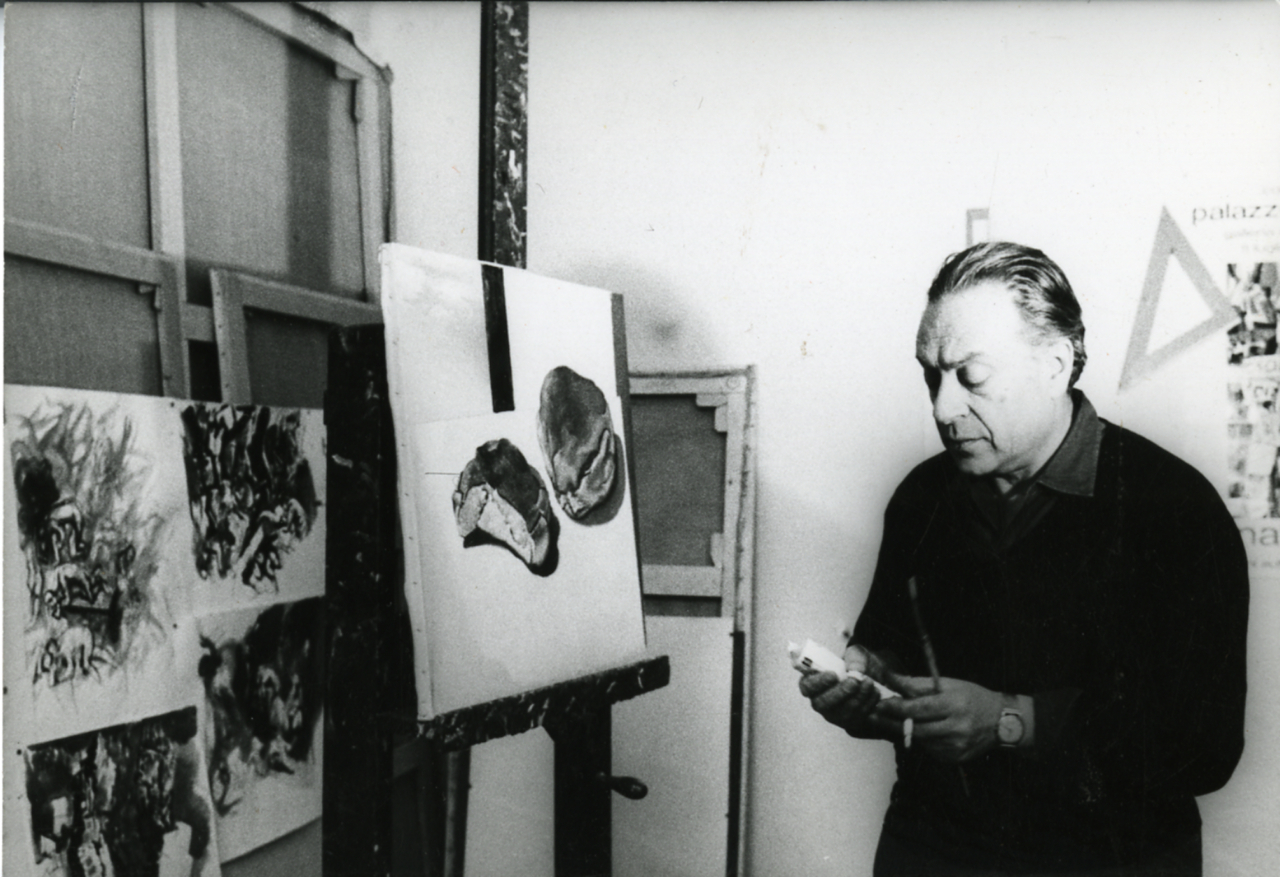

== Electoral history ==
| Election | House | Constituency | Party | Votes | Result | Notes |
|---|---|---|---|---|---|---|
| 1976 | Senate of the Republic | Sicily – Sciacca | PCI | 29,897 | Elected | |
| 1979 | Senate of the Republic | Apulia – Lucera | PCI | 29,418 | Elected | |
