= Agenore Fabbri =

Italian sculptor

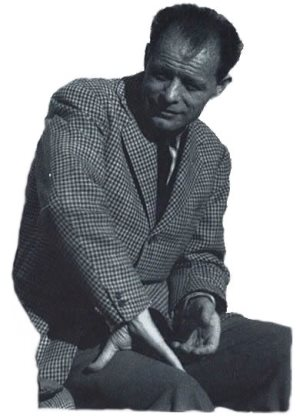
Agenore Fabbri

Agenore Fabbri (20 May 1911 – 7 November 1998) was an Italian sculptor and painter. He moved between a rigorous expressionism and experimental informalism.

== Biography ==
Fabbri was born in Quarrata, Tuscany. At the age of 12, he attended the Scuola d'Arte in Pistoia and then, under the instruction of the painter Fabio Casanova, he decided to embark on an artistic career and created his first sculptures, mainly using the wax and plaster.

In 1932 Fabbri, in order to continue his education at the Accademia di Belle Arti, moved to Florence where he frequented the artists' Caffè Giubbe Rosse, meeting point for the intellectuals known as the Ermetici Group (Eugenio Montale, Carlo Bo, etc.) and also came into contact with the painter Ottone Rosai and the poet Mario Luzi. At the end of the year he moved to Albisola (Savona), where he worked in the La Fiamma (The Flame) ceramic workshop and created his first terracotta sculptures, mainly biblical figures.[1] In 1933 he made friends with Tullio Mazzotti (better known by the name of Tullio d'Albisola), who owns the Giuseppe Mazzotti (Tullio's father) ceramic factory in Albissola Marina. It is here that the most significant artists of the second generation of Futurism worked under the patronage of Filippo Tommaso Marinetti: Fillia, Antonio Sant'Elia, Nicolaj Diulgheroff, etc. Later he established a small studio and came into contact with Arturo Martini and Lucio Fontana with whom he began a friendship until Fontana's death (1968).

In 1935 participated in the Mostra Nazionale in Naples while in 1938 received the Bagutta-Spotorno Award for the bronze II piccolo pescatore (The Little Fisherman), which was bought by the Museum of Modern Art, Milan on the advice of Arturo Martini. In the early 40s, Fabbri made his debut with his first solo exhibitions at the Gian Ferrari Gallery, Milan (1940) and then in Bergamo and Savona but shortly World War II and military service interrupted his career and he was sent to Yugoslavia and Greece.

In 1946 took up residence in Milan and during the summer months worked in Albisola, in the Mazzotti ceramic factory, where all his most significant terracotta sculptures were created. In the years after the War, Albisola again became a centre for art of international importance where Marino Marini, Giacomo Manzù, Aligi Sassu and Karel Appel, Guillaume Corneille and Asger Jorn from the COBRA Group, as well as Roberto Matta and Wifredo Lam worked. Later artists such as Giuseppe Capogrossi, Roberto Crippa, Gianni Dova, Emilio Scanavino and the young enfant prodige Piero Manzoni also arrived.

In 1947 he had his first meeting with Picasso in Vallauris and created terracotta and ceramic works such as Donna del popolo (Lady of the People, name given by Picasso himself), Uomo colpito (Struck Man) and La madre (The Mother).

In 1956, invited by the Chinese Government, he travelled to China for three months with Antonietta Raphael Mafai, Giulio Turcato, Aligi Sassu and others. His work was greatly influenced by this journey over the next few years. From 1958 onwards he made his debut on the international scene with solo exhibitions in the United States, New York City and Philadelphia, and in Europe, London, Paris, Stockholm, Rome and Milan as well as he was invited to numerous national and international group exhibitions of sculpture all over the world: the Venice Biennale in 1952 and 1960 (both with a solo room) and those of 1959 and 1964, as well as the Rome Quadriennale and then in Antwerp, Madrid, Paris, Zurich, Athens, The Hague, Munich, London, New York City, Boston, Tokyo, São Paulo, Mexico City, Cairo and Alexandria in Egypt.

In 1965 Fabbri was voted into the Accademia Nazionale di San Luca, Rome and in 1967, he illustrated ten poems by Nobel Prize Salvatore Quasimodo who, after a long friendship, had dedicated an open letter to Fabbri which was published in the Italian weekly magazine Tempo on the occasion of his solo exhibition at the Borgogna Gallery, Milan.

In the 80s his work was exhibited mainly in Germany with major retrospectives at the Lehmbruck Museum, Duisburg, the Ludwig Museum, Cologne, the Sprengel Museum, Hanover and the Fellbach Triennial. In 1984, the Spanish poet Rafael Alberti, who had been a friend of Fabbri's for many years, wrote forty poems about his work; at the same time, a book and a documentary film featuring both artists was produced while in 1991, as a designer for Tecno Milan, he created a bench that is still widely distributed in Europe and America.

In his career Fabbri received awards including the International Sculpture Award, Cannes in 1955, the International Sculpture Award, Carrara in 1959, the First Prize at the Mostra d'Arte Sacra, Trieste in 1966 and those of the Triennale di Milano where he was appointed with two Gold Medals and the Grand Prix for Ceramics. In 1998 he was elected President of the Accademia Nazionale di San Luca. On 4 August, Fabbri was abruptly hospitalized with a brain haemorrhage and died 7 November in Savona.

== Work ==
At his beginnings, in the 30s and the 40s Fabbri worked mainly with ceramic and terracotta, developing progressively new solutions such as riflessatura (reflection), while in the following two decades bronze and wood became the materials of choice: the first one is characterized by a convulsive modelling and deep cuts in the figure while the second one is marked by ruptures and cracks of the surfaces. In the same period he also executed many artworks using the iron, tin and zinc, and steel. From 1981, he discovered the painting, before using the classic oil and acrylic colors and then, in the last phase of his career, adding to the canvas materials of "recovery" such as sand, stones, rags and textiles, tin cans, etc.

Fabbri was also the author of monumental works such as those in Milan (Caccia al Cinghiale, Boar Hunting, Palazzo Sormani), Pistoia, Savona (Monument to the Resistance) and large ceramic bas-reliefs such as Battaglia (Battle) in the Museum Manlio Trucco of Albisola and La favola di Orfeo (The Tale of Orpheus) in the Polo Tecnologico Libero Grassi of Quarrata (Tuscany).

Caccia al cinghiale by Agenore Fabbri. Photos by Paolo Monti

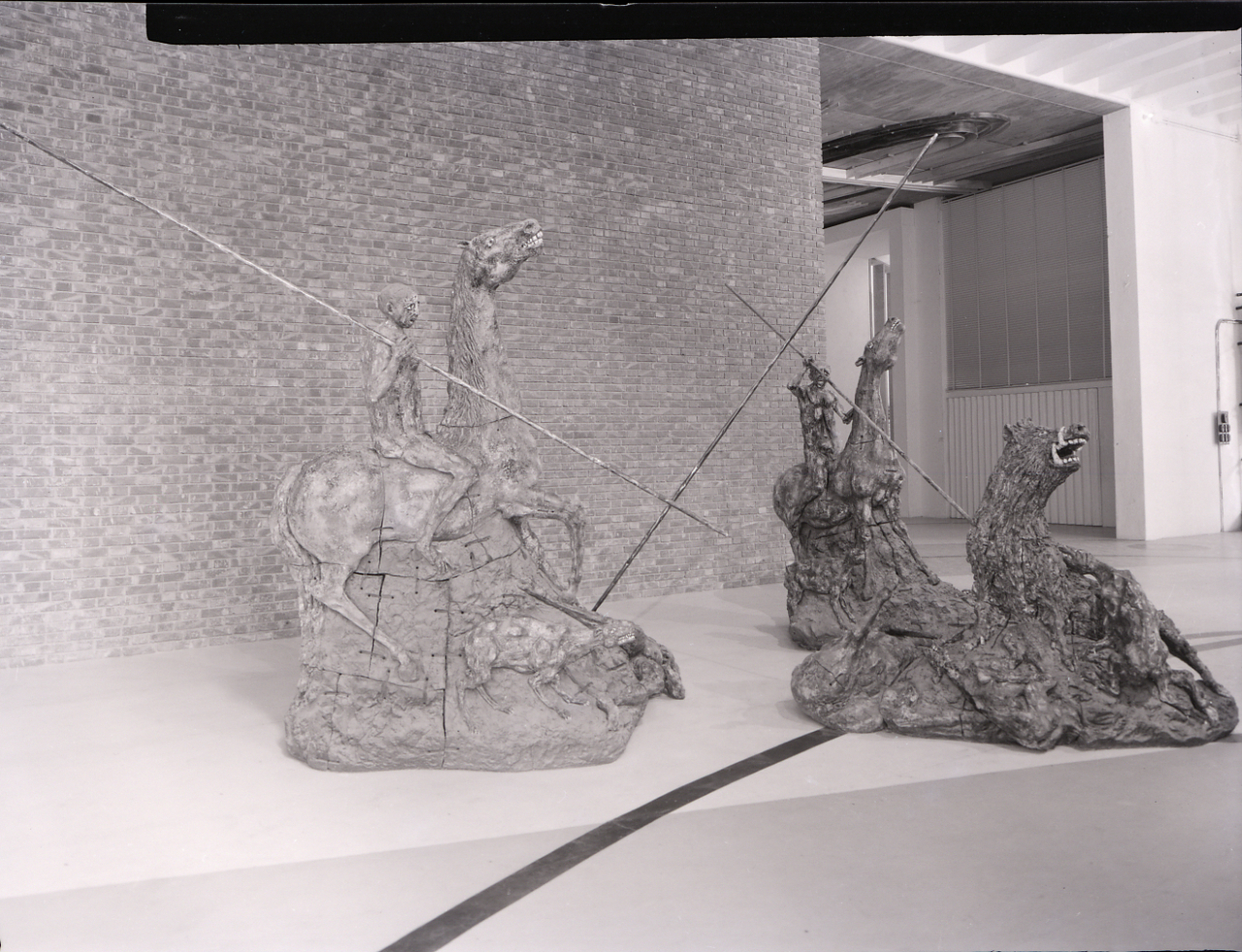

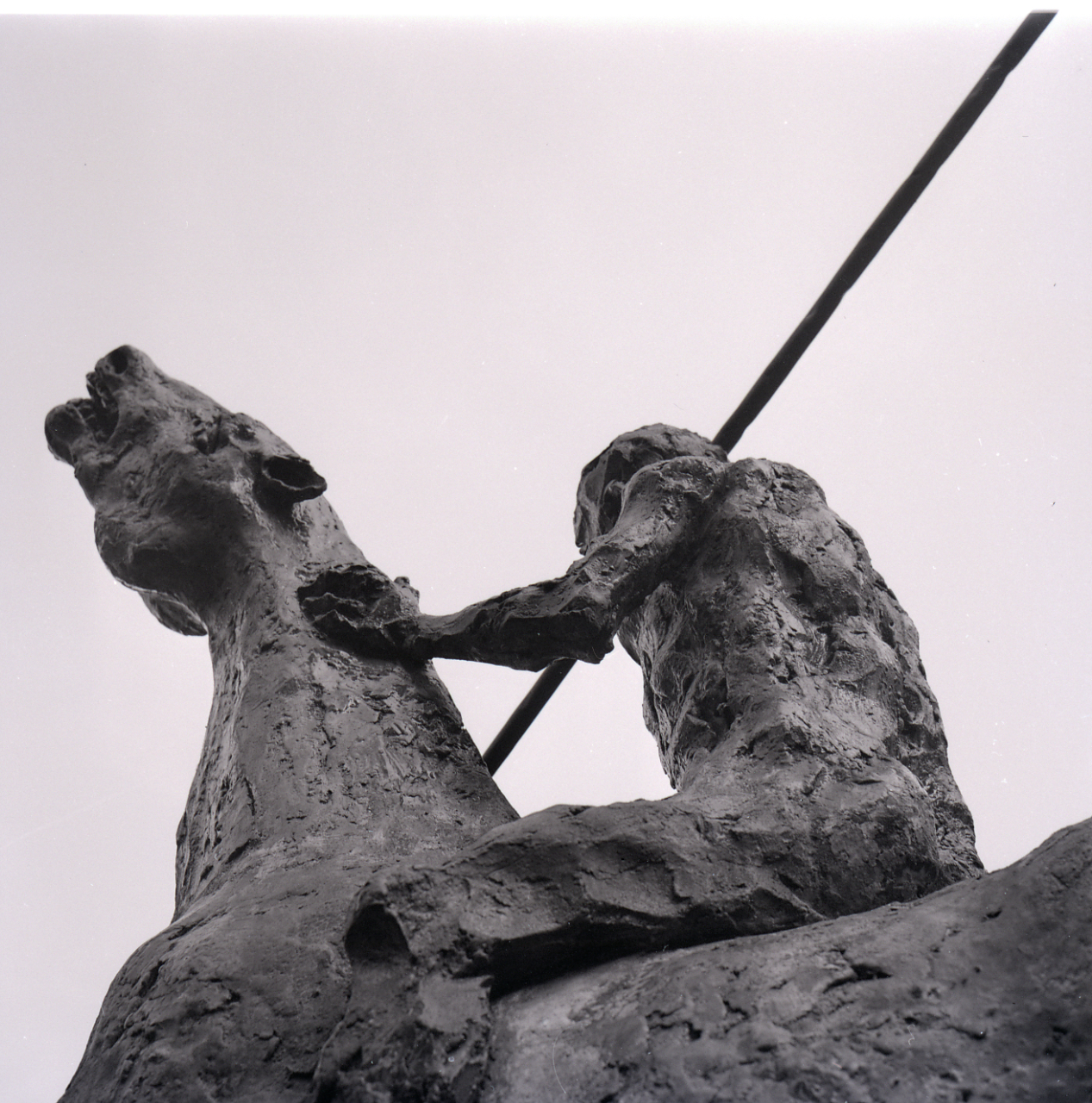

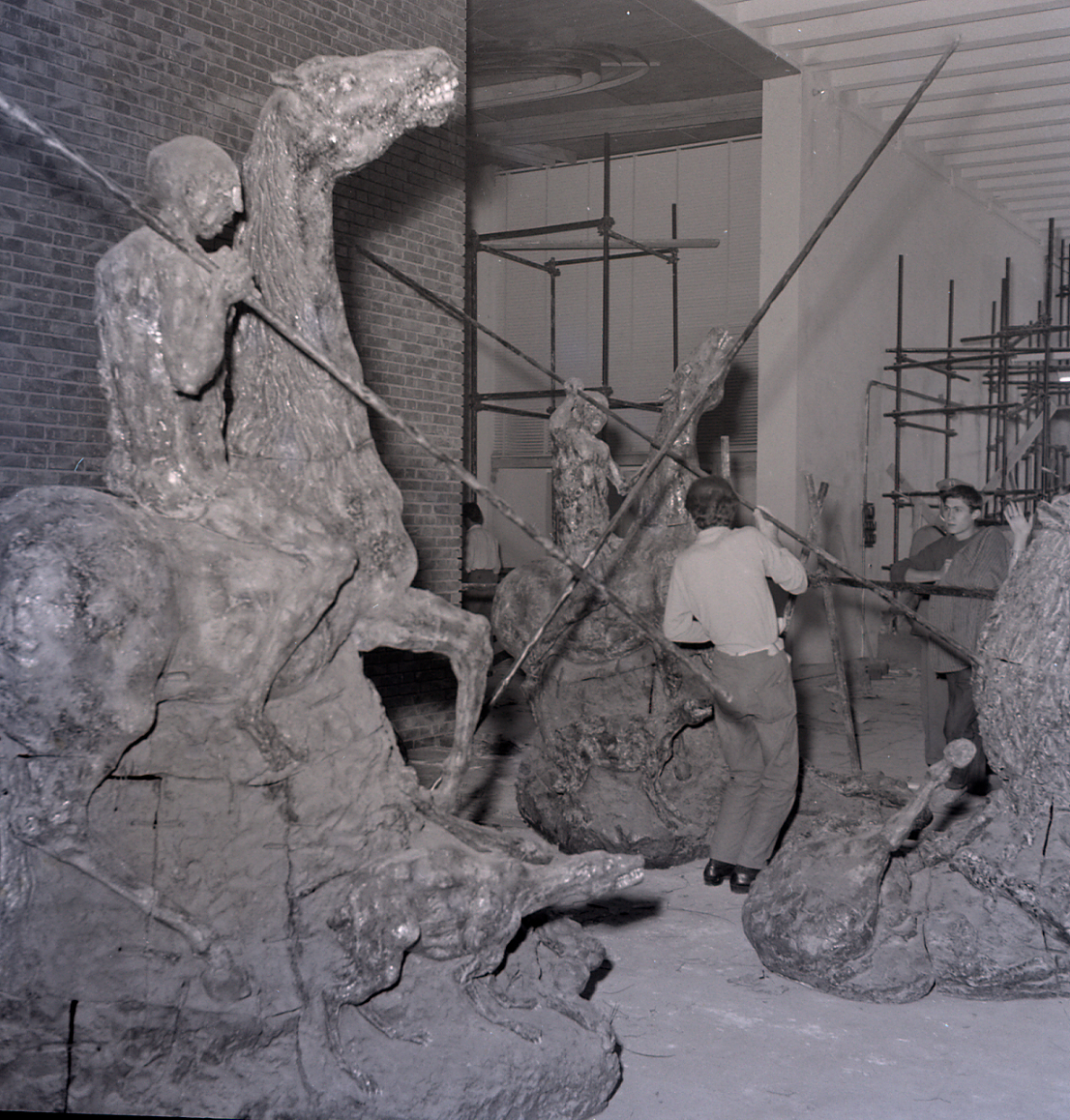

== Bibliography ==
1. Valsecchi Marco, Sei artisti milanesi 1960–1965, catalogue of the exhibition of Bruno Cassinari, Agenore Fabbri, Toni Fabris, Franco Francese, Umberto Milani, Ennio Morlotti in the Palazzo della Gran Guardia, Verona, 1966 [Italian]
2. Sanesi Roberto, Bellonzi Fortunato, Russoli Franco, Tadini Emilio, Dino Buzzati, Fabbri Agenore. Agenore Fabbri. Sculpture Drawings, published by Lehmbruck Museum, Duisburg, 1984. ASIN B005SAHLX6 [English/German]
3. Steingraber Erich, Salzmann Siegfried, Gassiot-Talabot Gerald, Gillo Dorfles, Remi de Cnodder. Agenore Fabbri. Plastik und Malerei, Hirmer Verlag, Munich, 1988. ISBN 9783777447902 [German]
4. Bartsch Ingo, Feierabend V. F., Brockhaus Christoph, Ronte Dieter, Agenore Fabbri. Die informelle Phase, Gabriele Mazzotta Editore, Milan, 2002. ISBN 88-202-1381-8 [German]
5. Agenore Fabbri. Senso dell'esistenza, Studio d'Arte Campaiola, Rome, 2005 [Italian]
6. Agenore Fabbri. Catalogue Raisonné Sculpture/Painting, (II Vol. Italian/English/German), Silvana Editoriale, Milan, 2011. ISBN 978-8836620586/ISBN 978-8836620593
