= Antonietta Raphael =

Italian painter (1895–1975)

Antonietta Raphaël
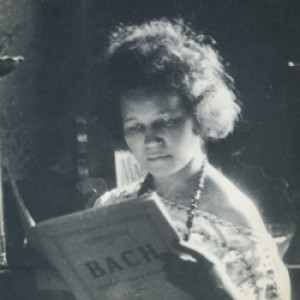
- Antonietta Raphaël in 1918
- Born: Antonietta Raphaël de Simon; 1895; Kaunas, Lithuania
- Died: 5 September 1975; Rome, Italy
- Education: Expressionism
- Known for: Painting, Sculpture
- Notable work: Adolescente (Adolescent, 1928) Simona in fasce (1928); Autoritratto con violino (Self-portrait with violin, 1928); Miriam dormiente (Sleeping Miriam, 1933) Niobe (1939)
- Movement: Scuola romana
- Patrons: Mario Mafai (husband) Alberto Della Ragione Roberto Longhi

Antonietta Raphaël (1895 – 5 September 1975) was an Italian sculptor and painter of Jewish heritage and Lithuanian birth, who founded the Scuola Romana (Roman School) movement together with her husband Mario Mafai. She was an artist characterised by a profound anti-academic conviction, also affirmed by her sculptures which, especially after World War II, dominated her output. They highlighted the tender and vibrant carnality present in stone, with works such as Miriam dormiente (Sleeping Miriam) and Nemesis.

== Biography ==
A rabbi's daughter, Raphael moved to London with her mother after her father's death. There she attended the British Museum, and came to know Jacob Epstein and Ossip Zadkine, the renowned French sculptor of Russian origin and member of the Expressionist movement. However, Antonietta in those days concentrated on studying music, and eventually graduated in piano at the Royal Academy of Music and teaching solfeggio in the East End.

At her mother's death in 1919, she moved to Paris and in 1924 to Rome. In 1925 Antonietta attended the Accademia di Belle Arti, befriended artist Mario Mafai and went to live with him, in a long-lasting relationship. They had three daughters: Miriam (1926), a journalist, partner of Communist politician Giancarlo Pajetta; Simona (1928) member of the Italian Senate and author; and Giulia (1930), a scenographer and costume designer.

== Career ==
In 1927, Raphael and Mafai moved to an apartment in via Cavour in Rome which quickly became a meeting point for literati including Giuseppe Ungaretti and Leonardo Sinisgalli, as well as young artists including Scipione, Renato Marino Mazzacurati, and Corrado Cagli. This represented the birth of the Scuola Romana.

In 1929, Raphael exhibited for the first time at I Sindacale of Lazio, supported by art historian Roberto Longhi. In 1930 she and Mafai went to Paris, and there she began to concentrate on sculpture rather than painting. In 1932 she was in London and met Jacob Epstein. She then moved permanently to Rome and started working on her masterpiece Fuga da Sodoma (Escape from Sodom), working as a guest of sculptor Ettore Colla in his studio for a year. Between 1936 and 1938 she exhibited at the Sindacali. Her plastic shapes, during this phase, show a lack of influence from any Italian sculpture movement of the period, but there are distinct references to Emile-Antoine Bourdelle. When the Fascist racial laws were implemented, Raphael escaped to Genoa together with her husband and daughters. The family was assisted and kept safe by art collector Emilio Jesi and philanthropist Alberto Della Ragione.

During World War II (from 1943 to 1945) Raphael stayed in Rome with her daughter Giulia, then moved again to work in Genoa with an influential group of older sculptors, though one that did not have a common style. This included Edoardo Alfieri, Nanni Servettaz, Raimondi, Camillo Maine, Lorenzo Garaventa, Sandro Cherchi, Agenore Fabbri, Roberto Bertagnin (brother-in-law of Arturo Martini) and Luigi Navone.

In 1948, Raphael exhibited at the Biennale di Venezia, after a difficult period of financial restrictions. As from 1952 art critics began fully appreciating Raphael's work and selected pieces were exhibited at the Galleria dello Zodiaco in Rome. In 1956 she travelled to China, where she exhibited in Beijing her artwork together with Aligi Sassu, Agenore Fabbri, Giulio Turcato and others, while continuing to participate in other exhibitions throughout Europe, Asia, and the Americas. At the 8th Rome Quadriennale of 1959-1960, dedicated to the Scuola Romana, many of her works were presented to the public, placing her among the greater exponents of this school. By this stage, Raphael was working almost exclusively on sculpture, leaving aside painting.

== Critical appraisal ==
Due to her free and open personality, and her diverse cultural experiences, Antonietta Raphael introduced within the Roman circle a note of unconventional internationalism. During the Via Cavour years, she produced portraits and landscapes characterised by a formal simplification, with compositive deformations in between the Naïve and the Chagallian oneiric fantasy. From 1932, her sculptures achieved vigorous naturalistic tones with symbolic and monumental emphases, recalling eastern art cultures.

== Cited sources and other sources ==
- V. Martinelli, Antonietta Raphaël, Rome 1960
- Raphaël, catalogue edited by A. Menzio, Ivrea 1960
- Raphaël, Scultura lingua viva, catalogue edited by M. Fagiolo, E. Coen, Rome 1978
- Antonietta Raphaël - Sculture, catalogue edited by F. D'Amico
- Gardens and ghettos. The Art of Jewish Life in Italy, catalogue edited by V. Mann, New York City 1989
- Arte italiana, presenze 1900-1945, catalogue edited by P. Hulten, G. Celant, Venezia 1989
- F. N. Arnoldi, Storia dell'Arte, vol. III, Milan 1989
- F. D'Amico, "Antonietta Raphaël", in Nove Maestri della scuola Romana, Turin 1992
- I Mafai - Vite parallele, catalogue edited by M. Fagiolo, with biography by di F. R. Morelli
- Antonietta Raphaël sculptures and painting 1933-1968, catalogue, Paolo Baldacci Gallery, New York City 1995.
- Enzo Siciliano, Il risveglio della bionda sirena. Raphaël e Mafai. Storia di un amore coniugale, Milan 2005
- Serena De Dominicis, Antonietta Raphaël Mafai. Un'artista non conforme, Selene Edizioni 2006

== Filmography ==
- Io non sono un altro - l'arte di Mario Mafai (I Am Not the Other - The Art of Mario Mafai), DVD, Studio Angeletti & Scuola Romana Archive, 2005, directed by Giorgio Cappozzo
