= Leonardo Sinisgalli =

Italian poet and art critic

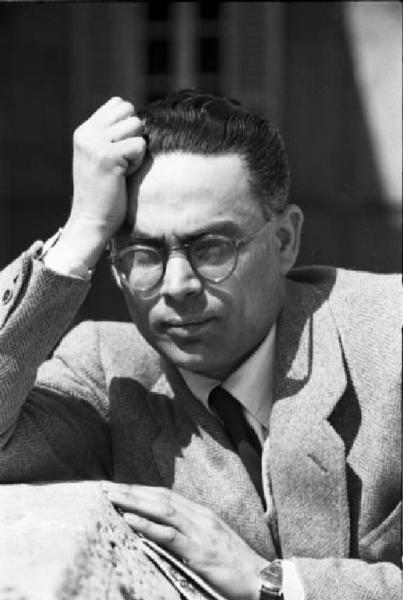
Leonardo Sinisgalli

Leonardo Sinisgalli (1908–1981) was an Italian poet and art critic active from the 1930s to the 1970s.

Sinisgalli was born in Montemurro, Basilicata. His early education and career led to him being called the "engineer poet".

In 1925, Sinisgalli moved to Rome where he studied engineering and mathematics. After completing his engineering degree in 1932, he moved to Milan where he worked as an architect and graphic artist. He was a close friend of the poet Giuseppe Ungaretti and painter Scipione. He worked at Milan for architecture and graphic design projects.

Sinisgalli's early collections such as Cuore (1927), 18 poesie (1936), Campi Elisi (1939) focused on themes from ancestral southern Italian myths. Later he explored a more relaxed style in I nuovi Campi Elisi (1947), La vigna vecchia (1952), L'età della luna (1962), Il passero e il lebbroso (1970), Mosche in bottiglia (1975) and Dimenticatoio (1978). He authored prose that analyzed the conflicts of existentialism and realism such as Fiori pari, fiori dispari (1945) and Belliboschi (1948). He also explored the scientific culture of the day in Furor mathematicus (1944) and Horror vacui (1945).

Sinisgalli founded and managed the magazine Civiltà delle Macchine (1953–1959), and was a member of the Scuola Romana. He also created two documentaries which consecutively won the Biennale di Venezia awards and edited radio broadcasting programmes.

He died in Rome in 1981.
