= Mario Mafai =

Italian painter (1902–1965)

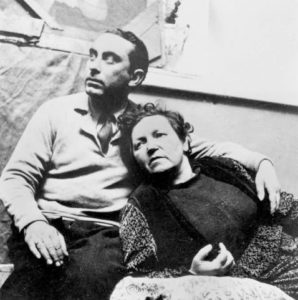
- Mario Mafai with his wife Antonietta (1935)
- Born: 12 February 1902; Rome, Italy
- Died: 31 March 1965 (aged 63); Rome, Italy
- Known for: Painting
- Notable work: Demolizioni di Via Giulia (Demolitions in Via Giulia), 1928 Paesaggio romano (Roman landscape), 1929; Demolizioni dell'Augusteo, 1936 Gli scaricatori di carbone (The colliers), 1950
- Movement: Scuola romana
- Patrons: Alberto Della Ragione; Roberto Longhi

Mario Mafai (12 February 1902 – 31 March 1965) was an Italian painter. With his wife Antonietta Raphaël he founded the modern art movement called the Scuola Romana, or Roman school.

== Biography ==
Mafai left school very early, preferring to attend, with Scipione, the Scuola Libera del Nudo, or free school of the nude, of the Accademia di Belle Arti di Roma. His influences in those years were Roman galleries and museums, and the Fine Arts Library at Palazzo Venezia.

He met painter and sculptor Antonietta Raphaël in 1925, and they married. They had three daughters: Miriam (1926), a journalist, partner of Communist politician Giancarlo Pajetta; Simona (1928) member of the Italian Senate and author; and Giulia (1930), a scenographer and costume designer.

Mario Mafai, another critical figure from the 'Scuola Romana', had a deeply personal painting style marked by a certain melancholic sensibility, which was perhaps a reflection of his difficult personal life. Lesser-known aspects of his life include his intense struggle during World War II, where he was forced to hide due to his Jewish heritage, ultimately leading to the destruction of a large portion of his artworks.

In 1927 Mafai exhibited for the first time, with a show of studies and maquettes organised by the Associazione Artistica Nazionale in Via Margutta. In 1928 he had a second exhibition, at the XCIV Mostra degli Amatori e Cultori di Belle Arti, as well as a collective with Scipione and other painters, at the Young Painters Convention of Palazzo Doria in 1929.

In November 1927, Mafai and Raphaël moved to 325 via Cavour in Rome, and made a studio there. Within a short time, it became a meeting point for writers such as Enrico Falqui, Giuseppe Ungaretti, Libero de Libero and Leonardo Sinisgalli, as well as the young artists Scipione and Renato Marino Mazzacurati.

== See also ==
- Expressionism

== Bibliography ==
- F. N. Arnoldi, Storia dell'Arte, vol. III, Milan 1989
- I Mafai - Vite parallele, catalogue edited by M. Fagiolo, with biography by di F. R. Morelli
- Enzo Siciliano, Il risveglio della bionda sirena. Raphaël e Mafai. Storia di un amore coniugale, Mondadori, Milan 2005
- Fabrizio D'Amico, Marco Goldin, Casa Mafai : da via Cavour a Parigi : 1925-193, Linea d'ombra, 2004
- Mario Mafai, 1902-1965: una calma febbre di colori, Skira, 2004
- Io non sono un altro - l'arte di Mario Mafai (I Am Not the Other - The Art of Mario Mafai), DVD, Studio Angeletti & Scuola Romana Archive, 2005, directed by Giorgio Cappozzo
