= Scuola Romana =

20th-century Italian art movement

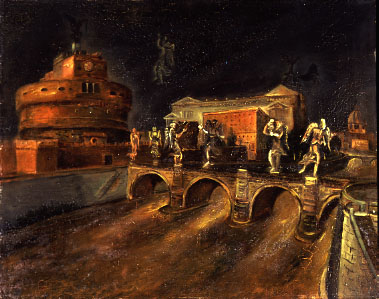
Il ponte degli angeli (The Bridge of Angels, 1930), painting by Scipione (Gino Bonichi)

Scuola romana or Scuola di via Cavour was a 20th-century art movement defined by a group of painters within Expressionism and active in Rome between 1928 and 1945, and with a second phase in the mid-1950s.

== Birth of the movement ==
In November 1927, artists Antonietta Raphaël and Mario Mafai moved to No. 325 of Roman street via Cavour, in a Savoyan palace subsequently demolished in 1930 in order to allow the fascist construction of the New Empire Way (currently the via dei Fori Imperiali). The apartment's larger room was transformed into a studio.

Within a short time, this studio became a meeting point for literati such as Enrico Falqui, Giuseppe Ungaretti, Libero de Libero, Leonardo Sinisgalli, as well as young artists Scipione, Renato Marino Mazzacurati, and Corrado Cagli.

== Contraposition to the sensibility of the Return to Order Movement ==
The spontaneous confluence of artists at the via Cavour studio does not appear to have been led by true and proper programmes or manifestos, but rather by friendship, cultural syntheses and a singular pictorial cohesion. With their firm approach to European expressionism, they formally contraposed the solid and orderly painting of neoclassic character, promoted by the Return to order current in the 1920s, which was particularly strong in the Italian sensibility of post-World War I.

The first identification of this artistic group should be attributed to Roberto Longhi, who wrote:

From its very address, I'd call this the Scuola di via Cavour, where Mafai and Raphaël used to work...

and added:

An eccentric and anarchoid art that could hardly be accepted by us, but it's all the same a notable sign of today's mores.

Longhi used this definition to indicate the special work he perceived these artists to be performing within the expressionist universe, breaking off from official art movements.

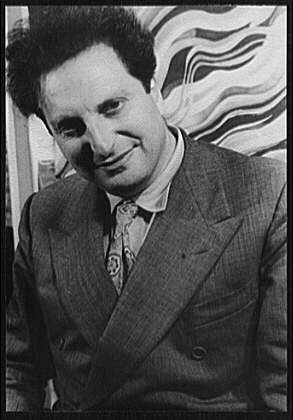
Carlo Levi in 1947, as a member of the 2nd season Scuola

During those years, painter Corrado Cagli too used the appellative of Scuola romana. His critique does not linger on name identification for the "nuovi pittori romani (new Roman painters)" animating this new movement. Cagli described a spreading sensitivity and spoke of an Astro di Roma (Roman Star), affirming that was the real poetic basis of the "new Romans" :

In a primordial dawn all has to be reconsidered, and Imagination relives all wonders and trembles for all mysteries.

thus highlighting the complex and articulated Roman situation, as opposed to what Cagli called the imperating Neoclassicism of the Novecento Italiano. The Scuola romana offered a wild painting style, expressive and disorderly, violent and with warm ochre and maroon tones. The formal rigour was replaced by a distinctly expressionist visionariness.

Scipione, for instance, brought to life a sort of Roman baroque expressionism, where often decadent landscapes appear of Rome's historical baroque centre, populated by priests and cardinals, seen with a vigorously expressive and hallucinated eye. Similar themes were present in Raffaele Frumenti's paintings in the second season of the Scuola, with vivid red hues and soft brush strokes.

== Second Season of the Scuola Romana ==
After 1930, instead of dying out, the Scuola Romana continued with various other artists of a "second season", which developed during the 1930s and matured soon after World War II. Among them were Roberto Melli, Giovanni Stradone, Renato Marino Mazzacurati, Guglielmo Janni, Renzo Vespignani and the so-called tonalists led by Corrado Cagli, Carlo Levi, Emanuele Cavalli and Capogrossi, all gravitating around the activities of the "Galleria della Cometa”.

Later members included personalities such as Fausto Pirandello (son of Nobel Prize Luigi), Renato Guttuso, the brothers Afro and Mirko Basaldella, Leoncillo Leonardi, Raffaele Frumenti, Sante Monachesi, Giovanni Omiccioli and Toti Scialoja.

== Museum of the Scuola Romana ==
The Villa Torlonia in Rome hosts, in its classic "Casino Nobile", the renowned Museums of Villa Torlonia, part of the Museum System of the Comune di Roma: on its 2nd floor one can visit the Museum of the Scuola Romana, offering a comprehensive view of this art movement.

== See also ==
- Return to order
- Avant-garde
- Expressionism
- Corrente di Vita
- Classicism
- Novecento Italiano
- Baroque architecture
- Baroque painting
- Villa Torlonia, Rome
- Figurative art
- Representational Art

== Bibliography ==
- Giorgio Castelfranco and Dario Durbé, La Scuola Romana dal 1930 al 1945, Rome, De Luca, 1960
- Maurizio Fagiolo Dell'Arco, Scuola Romana: Pittura e scultura a Roma dal 1919 al 1943, Rome, De Luca, 1986 ISBN 88-202-0829-6
- Maurizio Fagiolo Dell'Arco, Valerio Rivosecchi and Emily Braun, Scuola Romana: Artisti tra le due guerre, Milan, Mazzotta, 1988 ISBN 88-202-0846-6
