= Scipione (painter) =

Italian painter

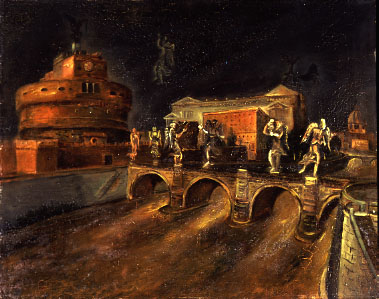
Il ponte degli angeli, 1930 (The Angels' Bridge)

Gino Bonichi (February 25, 1904 – November 9, 1933), known as Scipione, was an Italian painter and writer.

He was born in Macerata. In 1909 he moved to Rome, where he later enrolled at the Scuola Libera di Nudo of the Accademia di Belle Arti di Roma. He founded with Mario Mafai and Antonietta Raphael the Scuola romana, a group of artists active in Rome who were influenced by Expressionism, and opposed the officially approved art of the Fascist period. He exhibited his work for the first time in 1927. At about this time, he also began publishing his poetry and essays.

Scipione's interest in art history led him to study the Italian old masters, as well as El Greco and Goya. Expressionists such as Chaïm Soutine, James Ensor and George Grosz influenced the development of his style, which was characterized by mysticism and a personal symbolism. His period of greatest activity was between 1927 and the autumn of 1930; during these years he produced his most important works, such as Still-life with a Bowler Hat (1929) and Still-life with a Feather (1929).

His unique style combined elements of symbolism, surrealism, and expressionism, evoking an intense emotional impact through his vivid color palette and distorted figuration.

He exhibited in the Venice Biennale in 1930, and at the first Rome Quadriennale in 1931. In the last two years of his life, the tuberculosis from which he had suffered for years forced him to abandon painting in favor of drawing. He died in Arco on November 9, 1933.

The Italian painter Claudio Bonichi (born in 1943) is Scipione's nephew.

== Works ==
- Scipione (2001). Brunella Antomarini; Susan Stewart (eds.). Poesie e prose. Charta. ISBN 978-88-8158-329-4.
