= Corrado Cagli =

Italian painter (1910–1976)

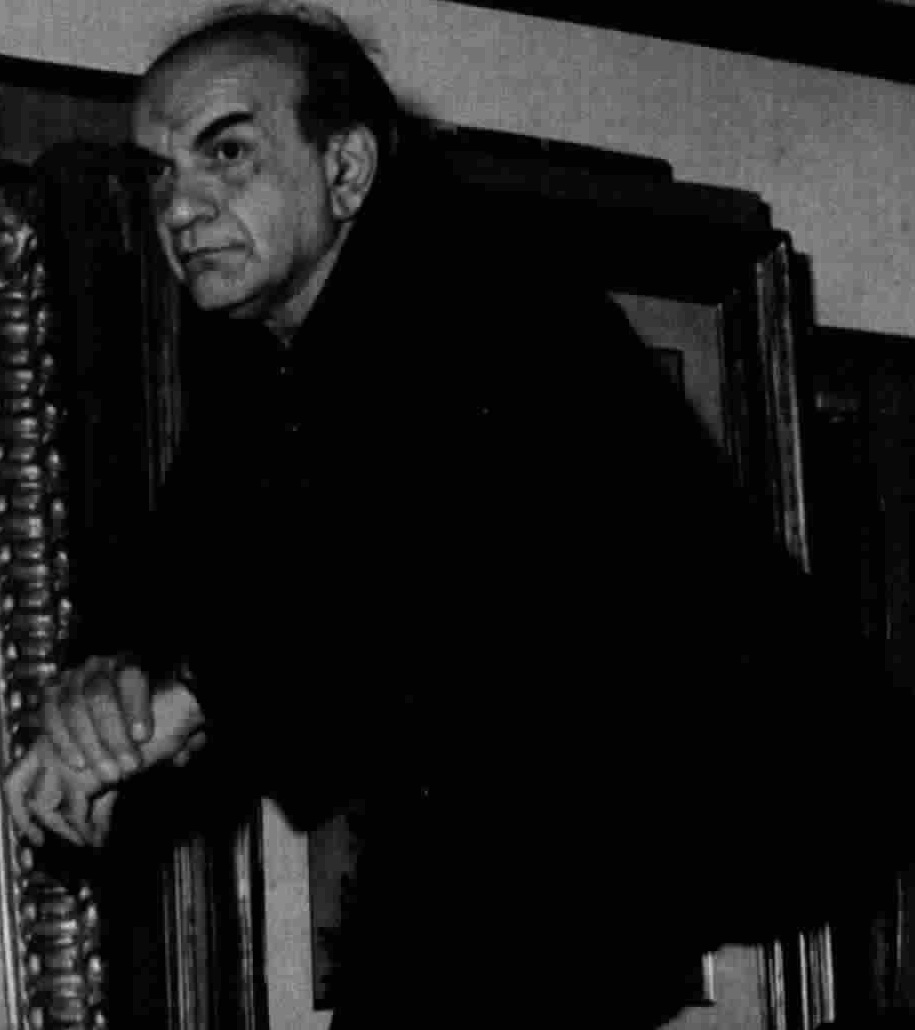
Corrado Cagli (1969)

Corrado Cagli (1910–1976) was an Italian painter of Jewish heritage, who lived in the United States during World War II.

Cagli was born in Ancona but he moved with his family to Rome in 1915 at the age of five.

In 1927, he made his artistic debut, with a mural painted on a building in Via Sistina. The following year, he made another mural painting in a hall in Via Vantaggio. In 1932, he held his first personal exhibition at the Gallery of Art of Rome.

Together with other artists such as Giuseppe Capogrossi and Emanuele Cavalli, he formed the group "New Roman School of Painting," better known as Scuola Romana. In 1937 and 1938, he exhibited works at the "Comet" gallery in New York City.

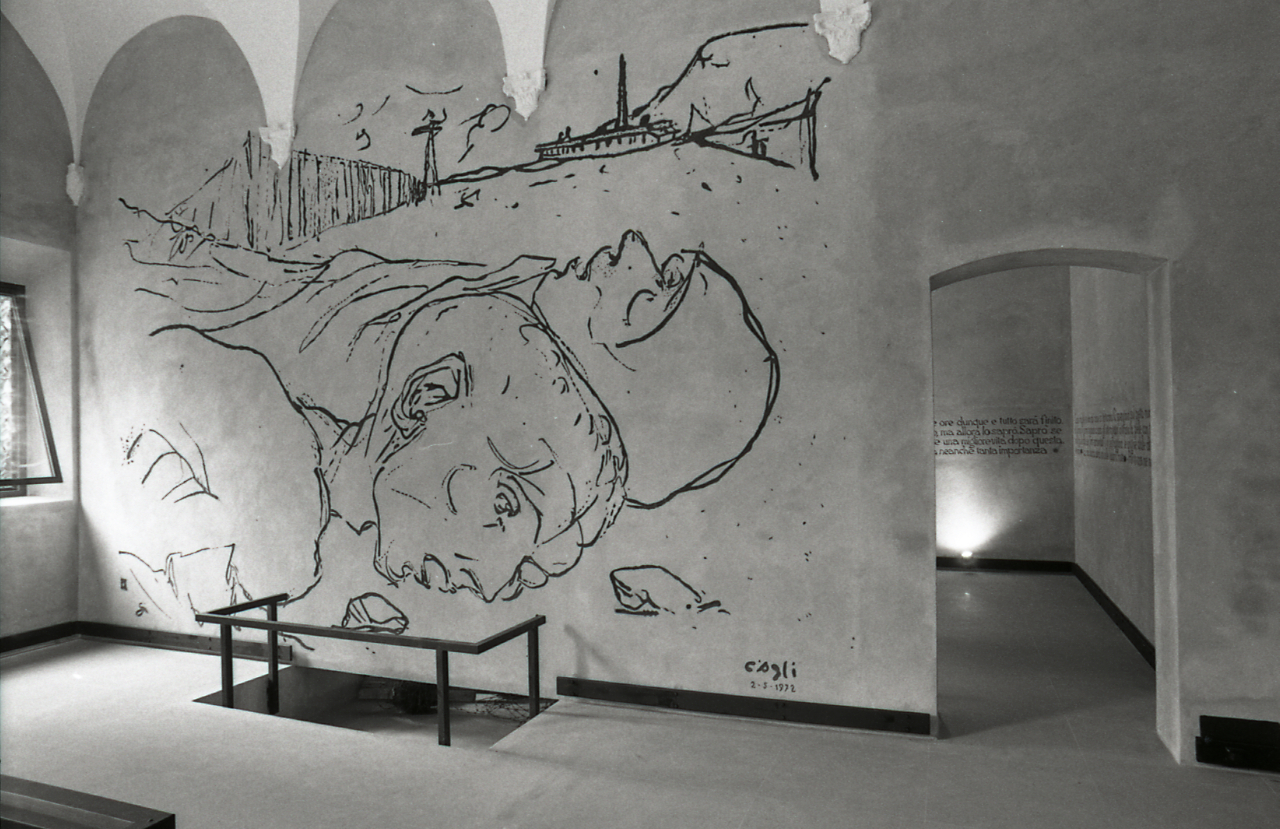
Photo by Paolo Monti

In 1938, when Benito Mussolini stepped up the persecution of Jews, Cagli fled to Paris and later went to New York where he became a U.S. citizen. He enlisted in the U.S. Army and was involved in the 1944 Normandy landings, and fought in Belgium and Germany. He was with the forces that liberated the Buchenwald concentration camp, and made a series of dramatic drawings on that subject.

In 1948, Cagli returned to Rome to take up permanent residence there. From that time forward, he experimented in various abstract and non-figurative techniques (neo-metaphysical, neo-cubist, informal).

He was awarded the Guggenheim prize (1946) and the Marzotto prize (1954).

Cagli died in Rome in 1976.

== See also ==
- Scuola Romana
- Expressionism
