= Roberto Melli =

Italian painter and sculptor

- Born: 1885; Ferrara, Italy
- Died: 1958 (aged 72–73); Rome, Italy
- Known for: Painting, sculpture
- Notable work: Landscapes, portraiture
- Movement: Scuola Romana

Roberto Melli (1885–1958) was an Italian painter and sculptor to the Scuola Romana, and active in Ferrara and Rome.

== Short biography ==
Melli was born in Ferrara to a Jewish family of traders. In his twenties, he moved to Genoa to start an apprenticeship as an engraver and thereby discovered his artistic talent.

He began an activity as xylographer, befriending painter and etcher Giorgio De Vincenzi, also from Ferrara. In 1910 Melli moved to Rome, where he shared a studio with sculptor Giovanni Prini. In 1913 he participated in the first exhibition of the Scuola Romana, and subsequently exhibited his work at various shows organised by the Futurism movement, although Melli from then on would pursue his own peculiar style and technique.

In 1915, together with artists Vittorio Costantini, Cipriano Efisio Oppo and Guglielmo Pizzirani, Melli formed the "Gruppo Moderno Italiano" (Modern Italian Group) and in 1918 he contributed to the creation of the magazine "Valori plastici". He became friends with Giuseppe Capogrossi and Emanuele Cavalli, and undersigned the "Manifesto del Primordialismo Plastico".

After his personal exhibition in 1936, his public activity was interrupted by the Fascist antisemitic laws, which prohibited any Jewish artists to exhibit work in public galleries and teach in schools. This produced in Melli a profound crisis; his only comfort was his wife's closeness and love.

Melli resumed his artistic work after World War II, in his Roman flat at Testaccio, where each week he hosted a group of young painters who included Renato Guttuso, Enrico Accatino, and Fausto Pirandello. From 1945 he taught at the Accademia di Belle Arti of Rome and participated in several personal and collective exhibitions. By this time, Melli was considered one of the major representatives of the Scuola Romana. In 1950, he was finally invited to exhibit at the Biennale di Venezia, which honoured him with a personale.

In his last years, Melli continued a parallel activity of painter and art critic. In 1957 he published a book of poetry, Lunga favolosa notte (The Fabulous Long Night), and in 1958 the Galleria Nazionale d'Arte Moderna in Rome opened a retrospective exhibition of his work, organised by curators Nello Ponente and Palma Bucarelli.
Melli died soon after.

== Assessment ==
Melli was a painter of great visions, chromatism, and composition – at times, intimate in his pictorial expressions, at others strongly figurative. Exhibited permanently at the Galleria Nazionale d'Arte Moderna of Rome, two works are especially important in his production: La casa rossa (The Red House) (1923), a figurative painting that seems a precursor of Edward Hopper's style and much of the American production; and the sculpture Signora dal Cappello Nero (Lady with Black Hat) (1913), this too an anticipation of a parallel tridimensional experimentation by Italian artist Umberto Boccioni.

Another work of profound intensity was Melli's last, dramatic self-portrait, painted the same month of his death and currently kept at the Portrait Gallery of Palazzo Pitti, in Florence. Important also are his writings, such as his collection of poems, Lunga favolosa notte (The Fabulous Long Night) of 1957.

== Permanent exhibitions ==
- Gallery of Modern Art in Florence
- Galleria Nazionale d'Arte Moderna in Rome
- Museum of Modern and Contemporary Art Filippo de Pisis in Ferrara

== See also ==
- Giorgio De Vincenzi
- Cipriano Efisio Oppo
- Return to order
- Avant-garde
- Expressionism
- Corrente di Vita
- Classicism
- Novecento Italiano
- Figurative art
- Representational Art

== Bibliography ==
- Cinzia Martini, "Roberto Melli (1885–1958) – L'artista moderno dei valori tonali. Il critico scomodo della coerenza artistica", Preface by Carlo Busiri Vici (volume with CD incl. complete critical catalogue), MMC Edizioni, 2004. (in Italian)
- Roberto Melli, Catalogo della mostra, G. Appella & M. Calvesi (eds), Macerata, 1992 (with bibliography). (in Italian)
- – , Poesie: Lunga favolosa notte (Poems: The Fabulous Long Night), Editore De Luca, 1957. (in Italian)
- Alfredo Accatino, La veglia del sognatore: poesie e divagazioni di e su Roberto Melli: A 30 anni dalla morte, Sapienza University of Rome, 1988. (in Italian)
