= Pirandello (surname) =

Pirandello is a rare Italian surname from Sicily. Notable people with the surname include:

- Fausto Pirandello (1899–1975), Italian painter, son of Luigi
- Luigi Pirandello (1867–1936), Italian dramatist, novelist, poet, and short story writer
- Stefano Pirandello (1895–1972), Italian dramatist and writer, son of Luigi

== See also ==
- 12369 Pirandello, a main-belt asteroid
