= Emanuele Cavalli =

Italian painter & photographer (1904–1981)

- Born: 1904; Lucera, Italy
- Died: 1981 (aged 76–77); Florence, Italy
- Known for: Painting, photography
- Notable work: La sposa (The Bride, 1935) Donne (Women, 1935) Bagno nel fiume (Bath in the river, 1937)
- Movement: Scuola Romana
- Awards: 1948 – 1st Prize, II Regional Expo Solvay 1950 – Michetti Prize; 1953 – Fiorino Prize Florence; 1955 – Prize of the Italian Ministry of Education, VII Quadriennale di Roma; 1962 – Frosinone Prize; 1966 – Posillipo Prize Naples; 1967 – Golden Fiorino Florence 1969 – Fiorino Prize ex-aequo with Corrado Cagli
- Patrons: Massimo Bontempelli, Corrado Cagli

Emanuele Cavalli (1904–1981) was an Italian painter belonging to the modern movement of the Scuola Romana (Roman School). He was also a renowned photographer, who experimented with new techniques since the 1930s.

== Biography ==
The son of Apulian landowners, Cavalli moved to Rome in 1921, where he became a student of the Italian painter Felice Carena, also attending a local art college. In 1926 he exhibited some paintings at the Biennale di Venezia, where he would continue to exhibit regularly.

From 1927 to 1930, Cavalli attended some exhibitions together with the painters Giuseppe Capogrossi and Francesco Di Cocco, also travelling to France (1928), where he was introduced by his friend Onofrio Martinelli to the circle of Italiens de Paris (i.e., De Pisis, De Chirico, Savinio and others). He exhibited at the Salon Bovy in Paris with Fausto Pirandello and Di Cocco, then in 1930 he returned to Rome, where he became one of the painters of the Scuola Romana.

In a series of exhibitions Cavalli held from 1931 to 1933, the artist began elaborating Tonalism, a pictorial and aesthetic style that will find in him one of its best and most refined interpreters, even from the theoretical point of view. In these exhibitions he received the support from important art critics and collectors, as well as from renowned Italian author Massimo Bontempelli, the uncle of his friend Corrado Cagli and the promoter of "Magic realism", a literary and artistic movement which had many similarities with tonalistic painting.

In 1933 Cavalli, together with Capogrossi and Melli, wrote the "Manifesto del Primordialismo plastico" (Manifesto of Plastic Primordialism) defining the Tonalist Creed, with special emphasis on the style's spiritual and abstract side. In 1935 and 1943, Cavalli exhibited a group of paintings at the Quadriennale di Roma, developing the theme of painting-music relationships: he displayed a series of feminine figures of different tonalities, and explained this work within the terms of "contrapuntal sensitivity", comparing it to a "collection of preludes and fugues in major and minor tones".

Other important exhibitions were held by Cavalli at the Leonardo da Vinci Gallery of Florence in 1939 and at the Zodiaco of Rome in 1945, the latter crowned by the appointment as professor of Painting at Accademia di Belle Arti Firenze. He thus moved permanently to Florence with wife Vera Haberfeld. In 1949 Cavalli was affected by a deep crisis, increased by his professorship not being renewed and his close friends' change of style towards abstract art. The impression of being rejected by profession and art alike, with the concomitant affirmation of abstractism, depressed him deeply and he even came to destroy some of his previous work.

Cavalli continued to paint for the rest of his life, alternating it with photography and innovative imaging, receiving important commissions from public and private organisations.

== See also ==
- Expressionism
- Corrente di Vita
- Novecento Italiano
- Valori plastici
- Esotericism

== Bibliography ==
- F.Benzi, Tonalismo ed Esoterismo nella pittura di Emanuele Cavalli (catalogue, Galleria Arco Farnese), Rome 1984;
- F. Benzi, R. Lucchese, Emanuele Cavalli, Rome 1984
- Catalogue by Roma 1934, by F. D'Amico, G. Appella (Rome & Modena 1986
- M. Fagiolo Dell'Arco, Scuola Romana: pittura e scultura a Roma dal 1919 al 1943, Rome, De Luca, 1986
- M. Fagiolo Dell'Arco, Valerio Rivosecchi, Emily Braun, Scuola Romana. Artisti tra le due guerre, Milan, Mazzotta, 1988
- Scuola romana, catalogue by M.Fagiolo & V.Rivosecchi, intro. by F.R. Morelli, Milan 1988
- V.Rivosecchi, in Piero della Francesca e la pittura del Novecento, catalogue by M.Fagiolo e M.Lamberti, Venezia 1991
- G. Castelfranco, D. Durbe, La Scuola romana dal 1930 al 1945, Rome, De Luca, 1960
- Roma sotto le stelle ("Rome under the stars"), catalogue by N. Vespignani, M. Fagiolo, V. Rivosecchi, eds., Rome 1994
- General Catalogue of Galleria comunale d'arte moderna e contemporanea, ed. by G. Bonasegale, Rome 1995
