= Cesare Bazzani =

Italian architect and engineer

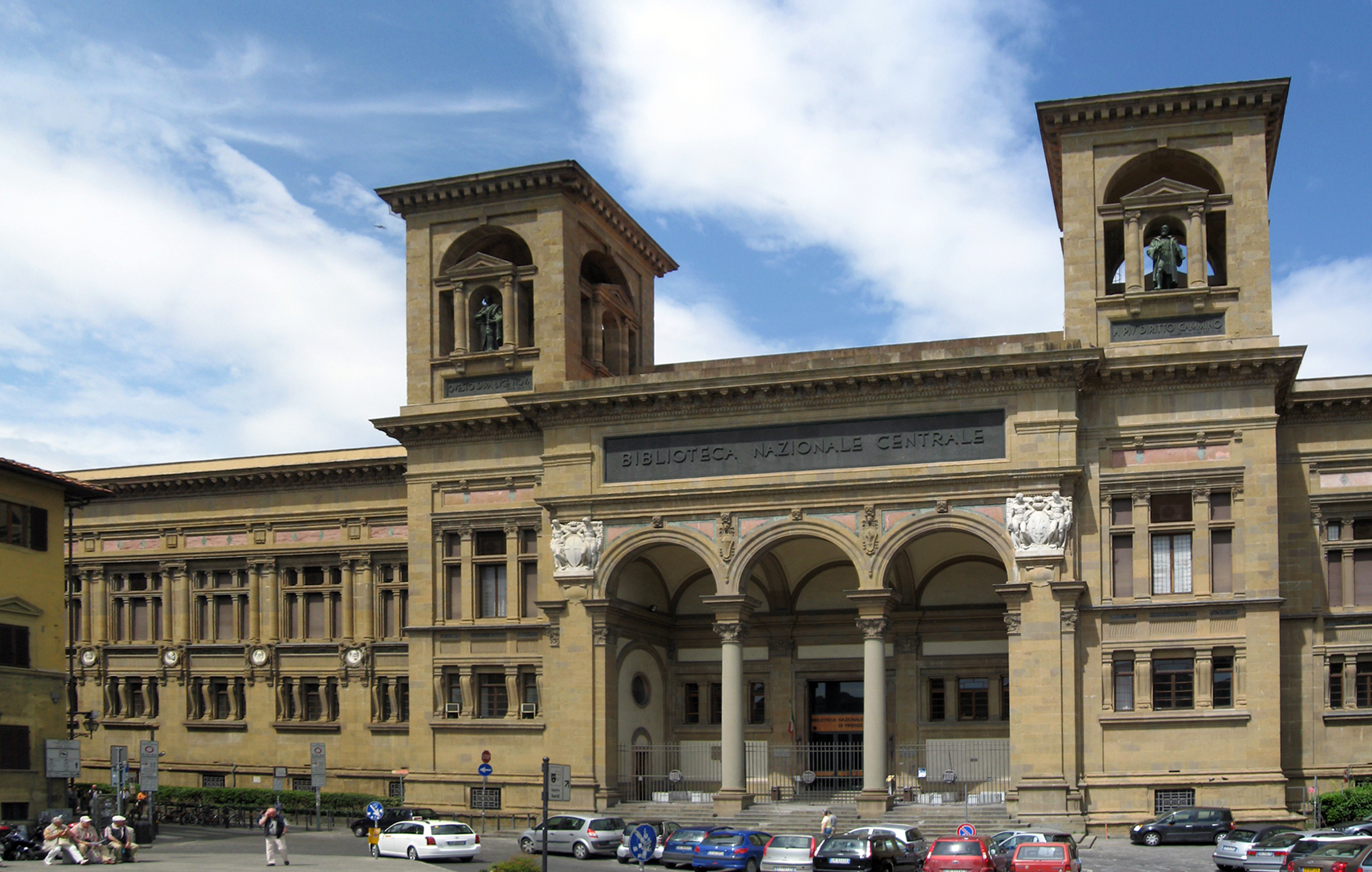
National Central Library (Florence)

Cesare Bazzani (1873–1939) was a prominent and prolific Italian architect and engineer. Active from 1911 until his death in 1939, Bazzani designed major municipal works in several cities.

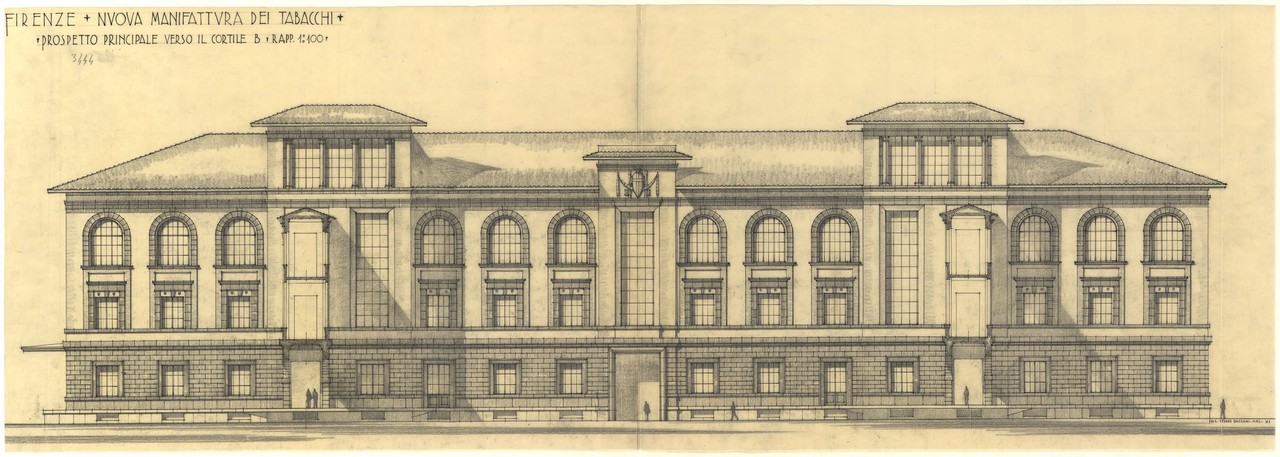
Nuova Manifattura Tabacchi, Florence, 1928. Front elevation.

== Works ==
- Biblioteca Nazionale Centrale (National Library of Italy), Florence, with V. Mazzei (1873–1939)
- Cassa di Risparmio, Ascoli Piceno (1905–1915)
- altar of the Chapel of the Madonna della Purità, Sant'Andrea della Valle, Rome (1912)
- Galleria Nazionale d'Arte Moderna, Rome, with exterior architectural friezes by sculptors Ermenegildo Luppi, Adolfo Laurenti, and Giovanni Prini (1911–1915)
- Palazzo del Governo, Terni (1920)
- Paradiso sul mare, a seaside casino, Anzio (1922)
- facade restoration and other work, Papal Basilica of Saint Mary of the Angels in Assisi (1924–1930)
- renovations to the Palazzo Trinci, Foligno (1927)
- Chiesa del Carmine, Messina (1931)
- Gran Madre di Dio, Rome (1931–1933)
- Pescara Cathedral (1939)
