= Luppi =

Luppi is a surname, and may refer to:

- Daniele Luppi (born 1972), Italian musician
- Davide Luppi (born 1990), Italian footballer
- Ermenegildo Luppi (1877–1937), Italian sculptor
- Federico Luppi (1936–2017), Argentine actor
- Jacopo Luppi (born 1992), Italian footballer
- Luppi (Bleach), a fictional character in Bleach
- Michele Luppi (born 1974), Italian singer and keyboardist
