= Giorgio De Vincenzi =

Italian painter (1884–1965)

- Artist's Signature
- Born: December 1884; Ferrara, Italy
- Died: February 1965 (aged 80); Bologna, Italy
- Known for: Painting, etching
- Notable work: Landscapes, portraiture
- Movement: Modernism
- Patrons: Comune di Bologna

Giorgio De Vincenzi (1884–1965), was an Italian painter and etcher. He was a versatile artist, using diverse techniques and specialised in landscapes and portraiture.

== Short biography and analysis ==
Born in Ferrara in December 1884, De Vincenzi did not follow a normal course of academic studies, but for a period attended the studio of the Italian painter Nicola Laurenti, where he also befriended Jewish artist Roberto Melli and painter-poet Filippo De Pisis.

His artistic production is well known nationally and is mostly dedicated to landscapes and female portraits. However, in his first artistic phase, De Vincenzi liked to paint his hometown's gardens and medieval walls, ideally anticipating the setting of Giorgio Bassani's books about Ferrara and its people suffering from racist persecution — later to become famous in movies such as The Garden of the Finzi-Continis by Vittorio de Sica.

Around 1928-1929 De Vincenzi moved to Bologna, where he died in 1965, after a lifetime of painting outside the contemporary parametres of the first half of the 20th century – in fact, De Vincenzi was not influenced by the various and changing currents of the period, but affirmed his own pictorial personality and experimented with new techniques.

His landscapes were well received by Italian art critics, and praised for their chromatic contrasts and poetic tones. His style was at times compared to Van Gogh's and Utrillo's, but with a specifically idiosyncratic trait.

== Personal exhibitions ==
- 1921. Galleria Vinciana, Milan.
- 1923. Galleria Borgonovo, Milan.
- 1925. Galleria Geri, Milan.
- 1926. Bottega della Poesia, Milan - presented by Carlo Carrà.
- 1943. Gallery of Rome di Roma. Rome.
- 1952. Galleria Puccini, Ancona.
- 1953-54. Sindacato Belle Arti, Bologna.
- 1955-56. Chamber of Commerce, Ferrara.
- 1957. Circolo Artistico, Bologna.

His works are permanently exhibited at the Modern Art Gallery of Bologna; Municipal Palace of Ferrara; Chamber of Commerce of Ferrara; Cassa di Risparmio di Ferrara; Museum of the Book of Brussels; Gabinetto delle Stampe e Disegni del Museo di Storia dell'Arte of the University of Pisa, and owned by many private collectors.

== See also ==
- Roberto Melli
- Guglielmo Pizzirani
- Cipriano Efisio Oppo
- Avant-garde
- Expressionism
- Corrente di Vita
- Novecento Italiano
- Figurative art
- Representational Art
