= Il turno (film) =

- Directed by: Tonino Cervi
- Starring: Vittorio Gassman; Laura Antonelli; Paolo Villaggio; Bernard Blier; Gianni Cavina; Milena Vukotic; Lila Kedrova; Turi Ferro
- Cinematography: Ennio Guarnieri
- Edited by: Nino Baragli
- Music by: Vince Tempera
- Production company: Mars Film Produzione
- Distributed by: Cinema International Corporation
- Release date: 1981
- Country: Italy
- Language: Italian

Il turno (The Turn) is a 1981 Italian comedy film directed by Tonino Cervi.

It is loosely based on the novel with the same name written by Luigi Pirandello.

== Cast ==
- Vittorio Gassman: Ciro Coppa
- Laura Antonelli: Stellina
- Paolo Villaggio: Don Pepe Alletto
- Bernard Blier: Don marcantonio
- Gianni Cavina: Renato
- Turi Ferro: Don Diego Alcozér
- Lila Kedrova: Maria
- Giuliana Calandra: Rosa
- Milena Vukotic: Elena
- Luigi Lodoli: Giulio
- Tiberio Murgia: Paolo
- Colette Shammah: Dana
