= One, No One and One Hundred Thousand =

Book by Luigi Pirandello

One, None and One Hundred Thousand
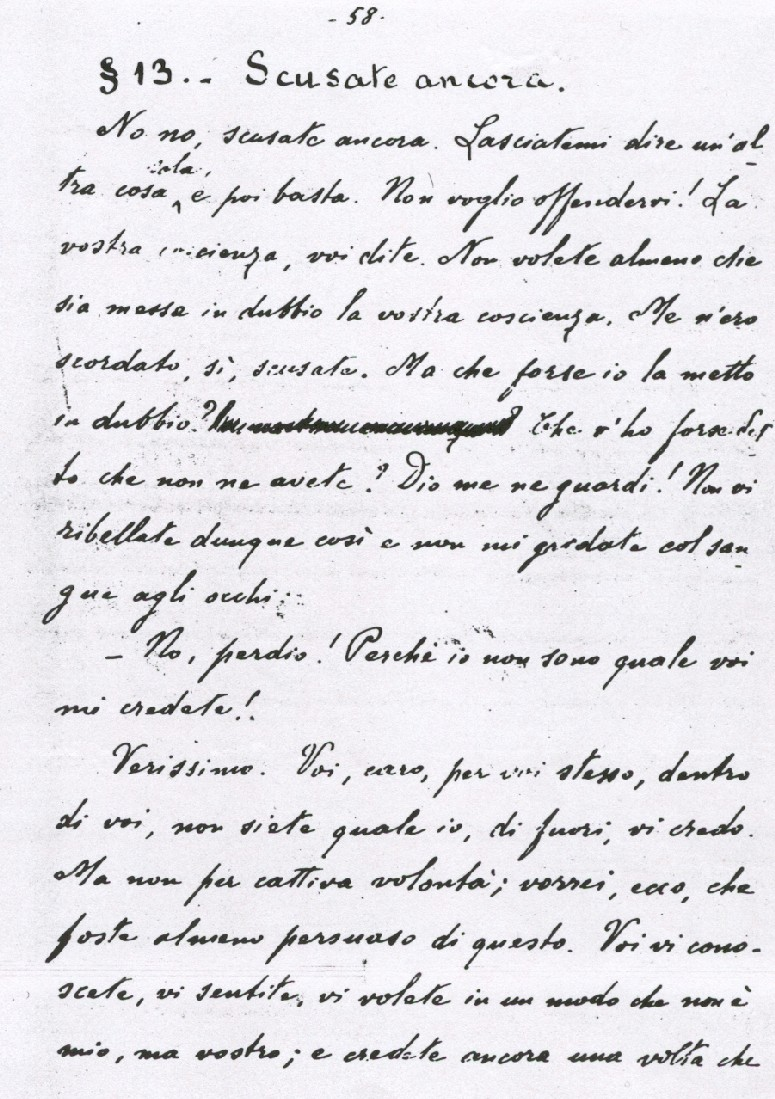
- original text of the book
- Author: Luigi Pirandello
- Original title: Uno, nessuno e centomila
- Language: Italian
- Genre: Novel
- Publication date: 1926
- Publication place: Italy
- Media type: Print (hardback and paperback)
- Pages: 81 pp
- OCLC: 224039533

One, No One and One Hundred Thousand (Italian: Uno, nessuno e centomila [ˈuːno nesˈsuːno e tˌtʃɛntoˈmiːla]) is a 1926 novel by the Italian writer Luigi Pirandello. It is Pirandello's last novel; his son later said that it took "more than 15 years" to write. In an autobiographical letter, published in 1924, the author refers to this work as the "...bitterest of all, profoundly humoristic, about the decomposition of life: Moscarda one, no one and one hundred thousand." The pages of the unfinished novel remained on Pirandello's desk for years and he would occasionally take out extracts and insert them into other works only to return, later, to the novel in a sort of uninterrupted compositive circle. Finally finished, Uno, Nessuno e Centomila came out in episodes between December 1925 and June 1926 in the magazine Fiera Letteraria.

== Plot ==
Vitangelo Moscarda discovers, by way of a completely irrelevant question that his wife poses to him, that everyone he knows, indeed everyone he has ever met, has constructed a Vitangelo persona in their own imagination and that none of these personas corresponds to the image of Vitangelo that he himself has constructed and believes himself to be.

== Reception ==
TIME described it as "ingeniously stat[ing] and restat[ing]" the idea that "everyone has a multiple personality [and] that if anyone tries to examine deeply his own multiplicity, nonentity, possible unity, he will quickly be called a madman."

The Kenyon Review stated that it "reads more like an essay in metaphysics than a plot-driven narrative," noting the "many audience-directed questions [Moscarda] poses", emphasizing that "despite beginning from premises which aren't particularly controversial, [the book] proceeds to draw out some very questionable conclusions," and assessing the book as enjoyable "precisely to the extent that [readers] find themselves agreeing with what Moscarda/Pirandello expounds."

== Translations into English ==
- One, None, and a Hundred-Thousand, translated by Samuel Putnam (1933)
- One, No One and One Hundred Thousand translated by William Weaver (Marsilio, 1990; ISBN 0-941419-74-6)
- One, None, and a Hundred Grand translated by Sean Wilsey (Archipelago Books, 2025)

== See also ==
- Foundational crisis of mathematics at the beginning of the 20th century
