= Paradiso sul mare =

Coordinates: 41°27′03″N 12°38′08″E

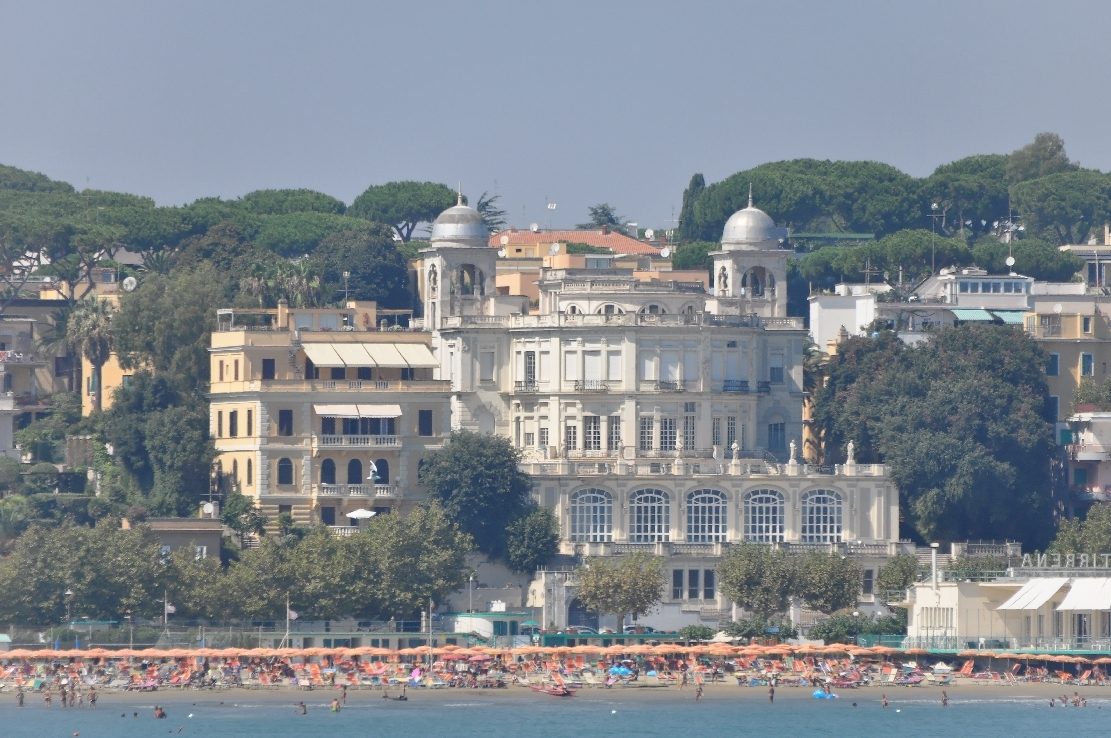
Paradiso sul mare

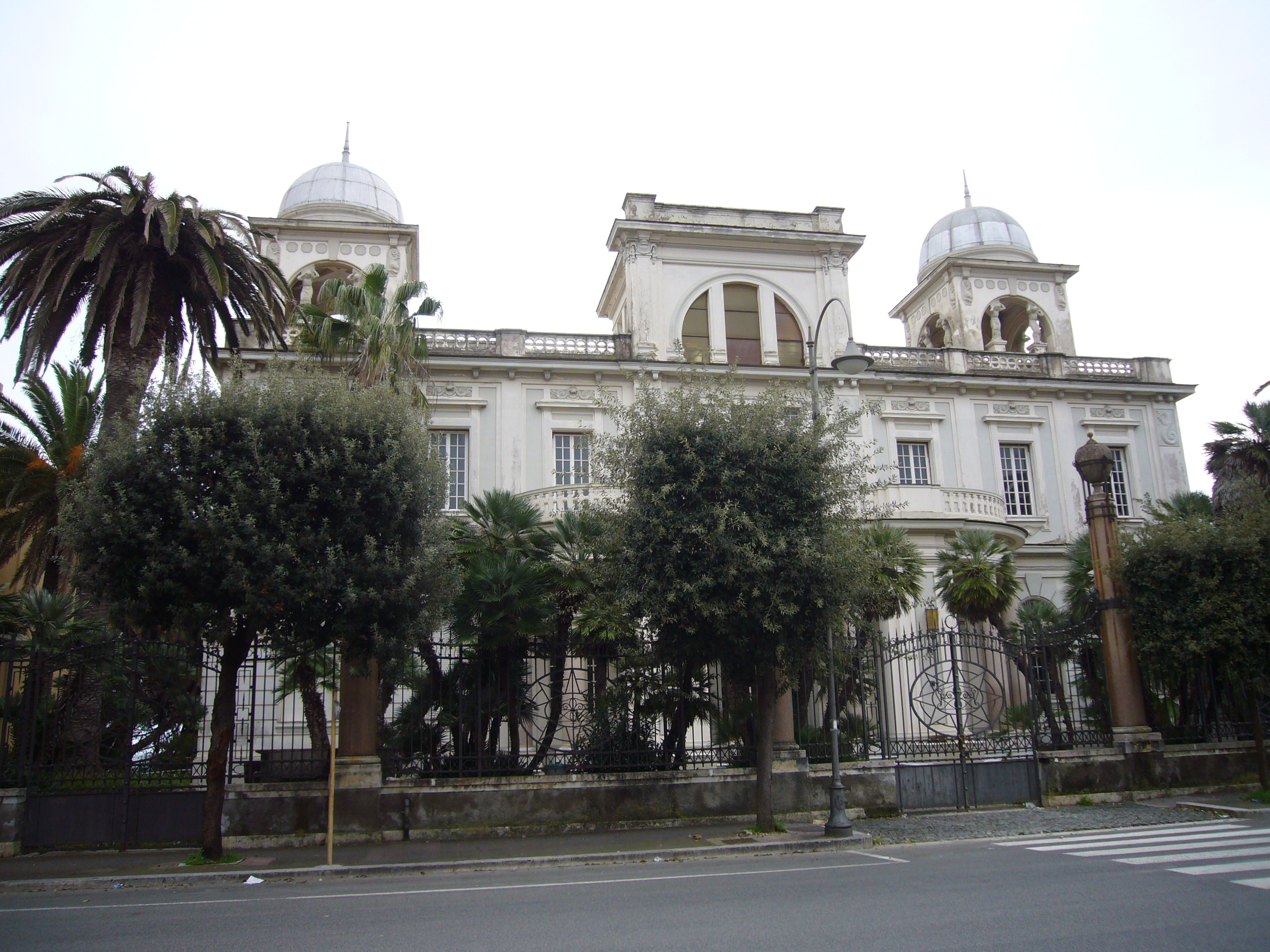
view from land side

Paradiso sul mare (Paradise on the sea), Anzio, Italy, is an Art Nouveau palace designed by the italian architect, Cesare Bazzani in 1919, and completed in 1924.

== History ==
Completed in 1924, the five-story palace is located on the promenade of the Anzio shoreline.

Paradiso sul mare is today owned by the municipality of Anzio. The beautiful rooms of the Paradiso sul mare initially were destined to house the casino of the city, but the casino was never opened.

Today the palace houses a hospitality school, event space, art exhibitions and movie sets.

== Appearances in films ==
The building has appeared in Alberto Sordi's 1973 Polvere di stelle (Stardust). In Federico Fellini's Amarcord, where it is featured as the "Grand Hotel of Rimini" and even appears on the original poster of the film designed by John Alcorn. Likewise, it was used as the location for the 'Sanremo Jazz Festival' in Anthony Minghella's The Talented Mr. Ripley.

== Exhibitions ==
- Controluce, Giuliano Giganti, Paradiso sul mare (2004)
- Teknemedia, archives, Bianca Madeccia, Rocco Paternostro, Luca Pietrosanti (2006)
- Il Litorale, incontro-spettacolo di arti visive, teatro, danza e musica, con circa trenta artisti delle varie discipline (2006)
- Anzio, Nettuno informa, Modellini militari (2007)
- Arte brasiliana al Paradiso sul mare, Dominique Le Comte, Joseph Pace, Carlos Araujo (2010)
- Trezeri Quarantadue, Un nuovo obiettivo per Anzio, Mostra fotografica, Paradiso sul mare (2010)
- Provincia di Roma, Marilda Dib (2010)
- Anzio Nettuno informa, Roger Waters of Pink Floyd receive the honorary citizenship of Anzio (2013)
- Sbarco di Anzio 70th Anniversary of the Landing of Anzio (2014)

== See also ==
- Anzio
- Battle of Anzio
