= Giustino Ferri =

Italian journalist and writer (1856–1913)

Giustino Lorenzo Ferri (23 March 1856, in Picinisco – 13 May 1913, in Rome) was an Italian journalist and writer.

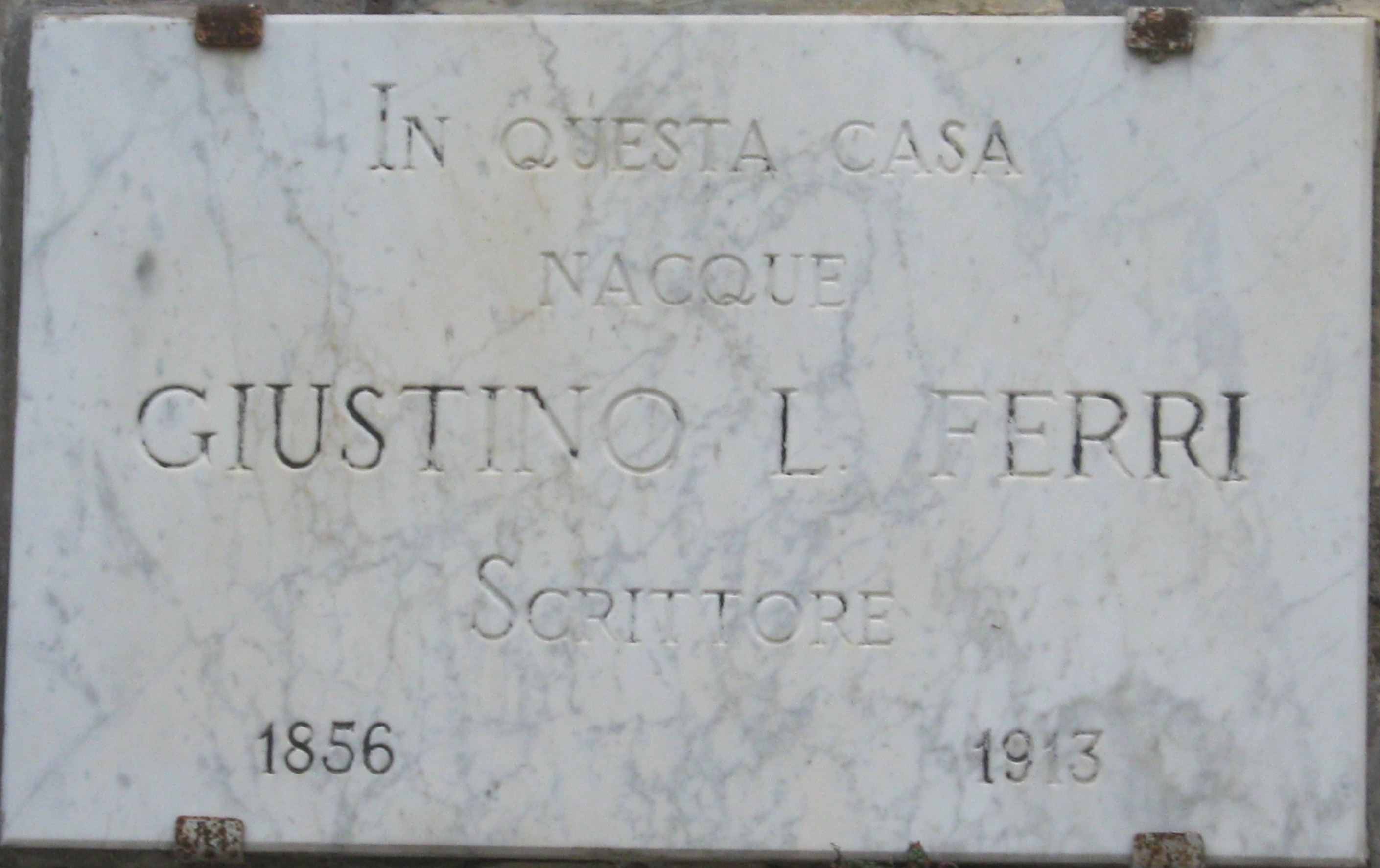
Plaque at his birthplace in Picinisco

== Biography ==
Giustino Ferri was born in the town of Picinisco. He studied first at the Liceo Tulliano of Arpino, then he graduated in 1878 from Naples as a lawyer. He moved to Rome in 1880, to work as a contributor for the journal Capitan Fracassa, founded by Luigi Arnaldo Vassallo, Federico Napoli, Gennaro Minervini, and Giuseppe Turco. In 1881 he also began writing for Cronaca Bizantina, and in 1884 for Domenica letteraria and Il Fanfulla. From 1887 to 1899, he wrote for the journal Don Chisciotte della Mancia and Il Caffaro of Genoa. He was a theater critic from 1889 on for the La Rivista d'Italia, Il Tirso, and finally Nuova Antologia. He also wrote numerous fictional romances, short stories, and novels. He often wrote under pseudonyms such as Leandro Marquis of Carabas, Furio Stiniger, Maffio Scavelli, Fulvio Ginestri and Plongiak.

He was a frequent patron at the Caffè Bussi, where he befriended Gabriele d'Annunzio, Luigi Capuana, and Luigi Pirandello. He died in Rome.

== Works ==
=== Romances ===
- Un dramma dell'Alhambra. Appendix to "Capitan Fracassa", 1881
- L'ultima notte. Appendix to "Capitan Fracassa", 1882
- Il duca di Fonteschiavi. Supplement to "Caffaro", Genoa, 1883–1884.
- Roma gialla. Roma, Sommaruga, 1884 (collection of three prior romances, the first renamed "Gli orecchini di Stefania")
- La vergine dei sette peccati: romanzo romantico. Appendix to "Capitan Fracassa", 1881; later in volume: Rome, Verdesi, 1885.
- La crisi. Appendix to "Don Chisciotte della Mancia", 1891.
- Il Capolavoro. Appendix to "Caffaro", 1892; later in volume: Rome-Turin, Società Editrice Nazionale Roux e Viarengo, 1901.
- La Canaglia, ovvero Roma sconosciuta. Rome, Perino, 1892.
- Roma sotterranea. Rome, Perino, 1892.
- Il capitano del Belphegor (under pseudonym Maffio Savelli). Rome-Turin, Società Editrice Nazionale Roux e Viarengo, 1901?.
- La fine del secolo XX: storia futura. Milan, Vallardi, 1906.
- La Camminante. Notes in "Nuova Antologia", 1908; later in volume: Rome, Casa editrice della "Nuova Antologia", 1910.
- Dea Passio: studio di vita provinciale. Notes in "Tribuna", 1907; later in volume: Naples, Ricciardi, 1910.
- La basilica insanguinata. Rome, Romanziere della Tribuna, 1910.
- Tre romanzi incompiuti: Il re di Roma, Flirt-Hotel, La spira.

=== Novels or stories ===
- Avventure ai bagni – Tuffolina si diverte, novelle e pezzi di varietà. Rome, Perino, 1885.
- Il castello fantasma: novelle. Roma, Voghera, 1899.
- Nerone: scene e costumi di Roma imperiale (pseud. Maffeo Savelli). Rome-Turin, Società Editrice Nazionale Roux e Viarengo, 1905 (5th ed. riv.).
- Fate benefiche. Firenze, Bemporad, 1899 (version in napoletano, adapted for children di 18 Fiabe di Giambattista Basile).

== Bibliography ==
Derived mainly from Italian Wikipedia entry:

- Franco D'Intino, Ferri, Giustino, in «Dizionario Biografico degli Italiani», vol. 47, Istituto dell'Enciclopedia Italiana, Roma 1997, ad vocem.
- Gerardo Vacana, Giustino Ferri: giornalista e scrittore (Picinisco 1856–Roma 1913). Alvito: Centro studi letterari "Val di Comino", 1997.
- Gabriella Vacca, Fra impegno documentario e tensione morale: la produzione letteraria di Giustino Ferri. [S.l.]: Filef Lazio – Sconfin@ndo, 2005 (Cassino: Publisher Idea Stampa).
