= Giuseppe Capogrossi =

Italian painter (1900–1972)

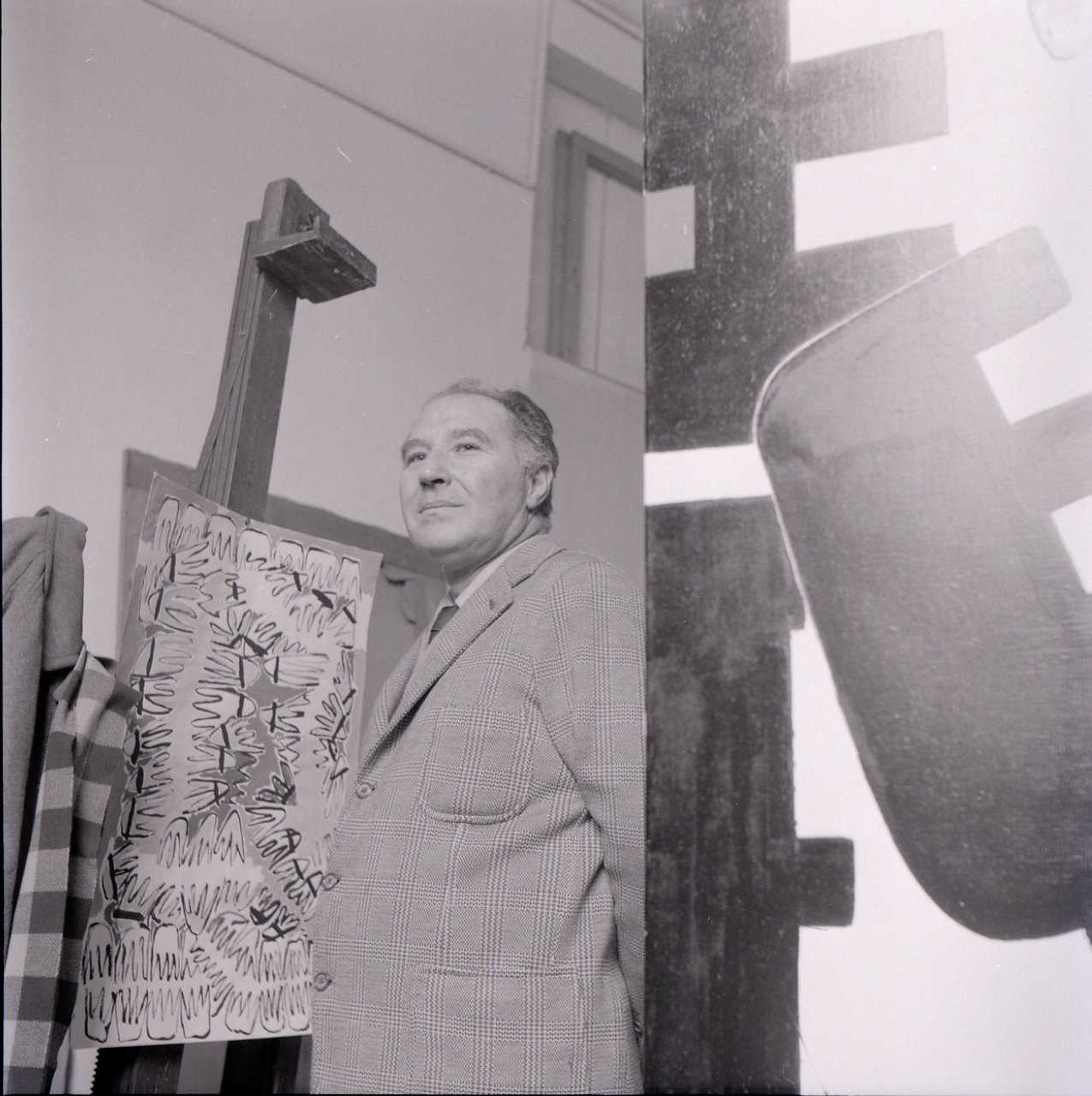
Capogrossi photographed in his studio, 1972. Fondo Paolo Monti, BEIC

Giuseppe Capogrossi (7 March 1900 – 9 October 1972) was an Italian painter.

== Biography ==
Capogrossi was born in Rome. After obtaining a degree in law in 1923–1924, he decided to study painting with Felice Carena at Accademia di Belle Arti di Roma. In 1927 Capogrossi embarked on a formative trip to Paris together with fellow artist and acquaintance Fausto Pirandello.

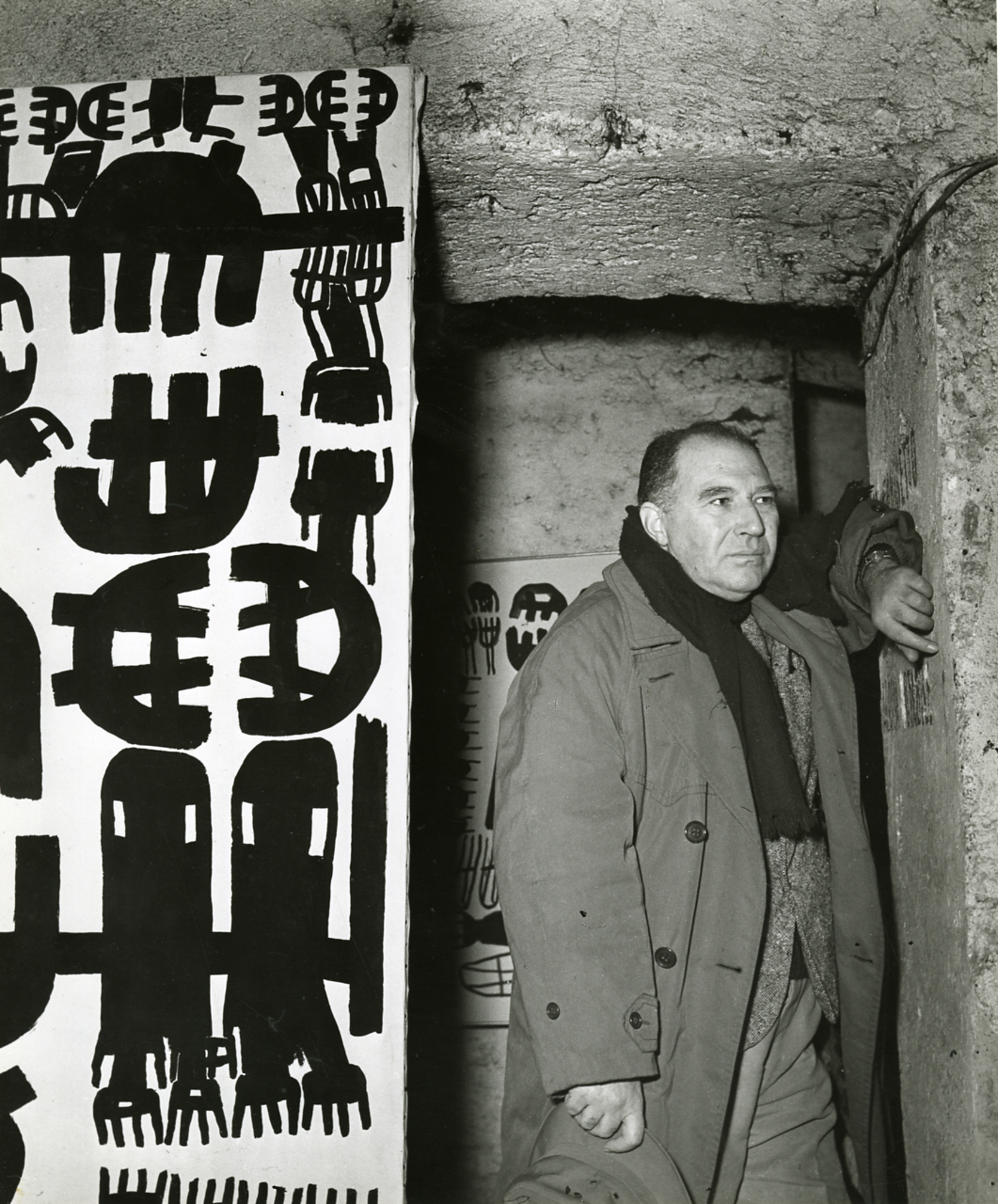
Giuseppe Capogrossi, 1955. Fondo Paolo Monti

In the 1930s Capogrossi participated to many group exhibitions in Rome, Venice and Milan and Paris, usually as associate to the so-called "Scuola romana" ("Roman school"). In 1930 he was invited to show at the 23rd edition of the Venice Biennale; In 1933 he signed with Emanuele Cavalli and others the "Manifesto del Primordialismo Plastico" (The Plastic Primordialism Manifest) and in 1934 he was one of the artists invited to the exhibition the "Exhibition of Contemporary Italian Painting" at the Western Art Museum in San Francisco.

In the years following World War II, Capogrossi's work changed in favour of a more abstract style. His work was part of the painting event in the art competition at the 1948 Summer Olympics. In 1950 he was one of the founders of Gruppo Origine, together with Mario Ballocco, Alberto Burri and Ettore Colla in Milan. The group rented a gallery space in Rome where they had their only exhibition in January 1951. The show wasn't successful and the four disbanded a few months later.

Capogrossi subsequently became one of the main exponents of Italian informal art, together with Lucio Fontana and Alberto Burri. Capogrossi participated in the Premio Bergamo in 1939, 1940 and 1942, and in exhibitions such as the first edition of Documenta in Kassel (1955) and the third and fifth São Paulo Art Biennial in 1955 and 1957.

Capogrossi died in Rome in 1972. In 2012, his work was the subject of a retrospective at the Peggy Guggenheim Collection in Venice.

== Collections ==
Capogrossi's work is held in the permanent collections of the Toledo Museum of Art, the British Museum, the Philadelphia Museum of Art, the University of Michigan Museum of Art, the Centre Pompidou, the Dallas Museum of Art, the Williams College Museum of Art, the Mildred Lane Kemper Art Museum, the Yale University Art Gallery, and the Museum of Modern Art.

== Exhibition views and works ==
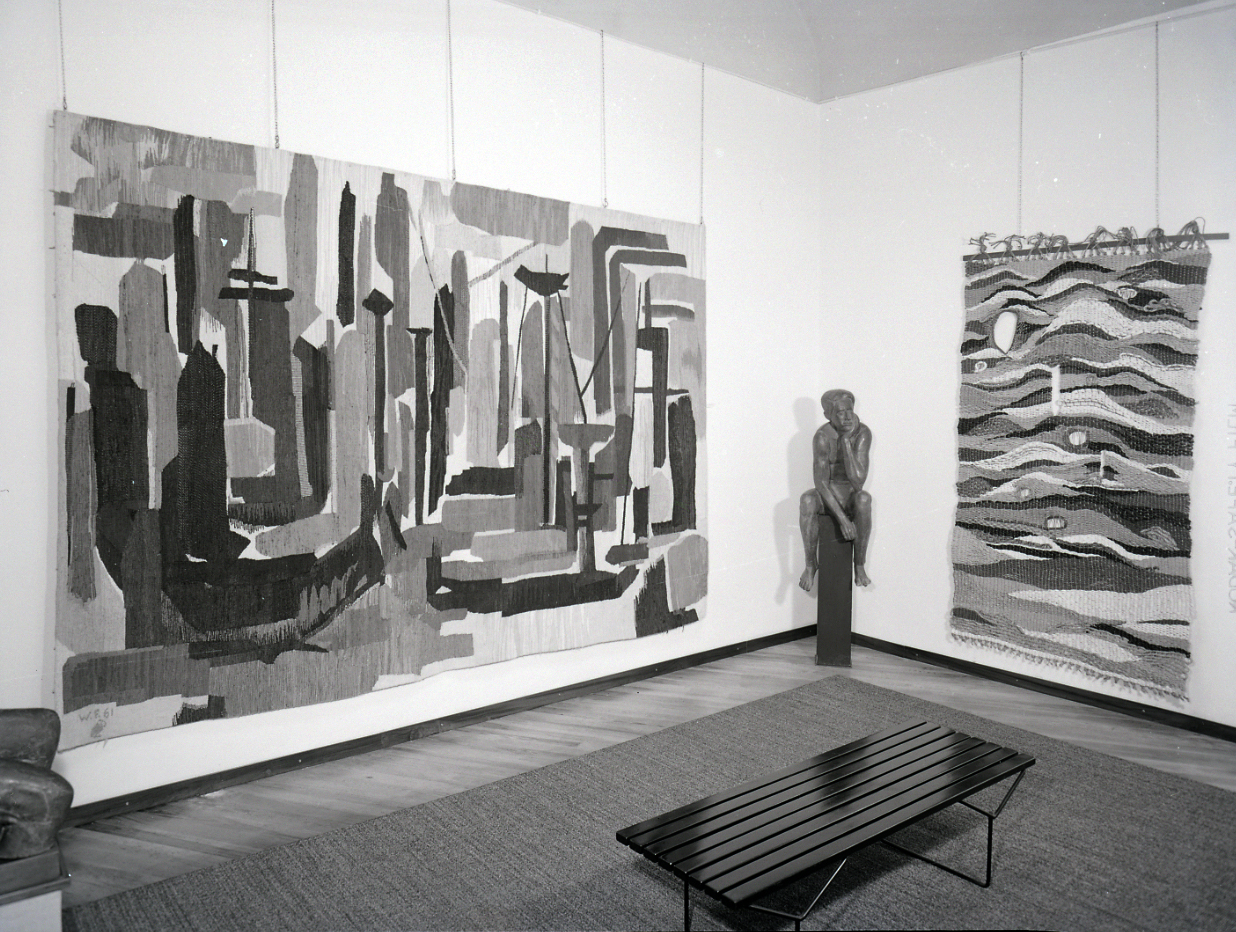
Galleria del Naviglio, Milan, 1963

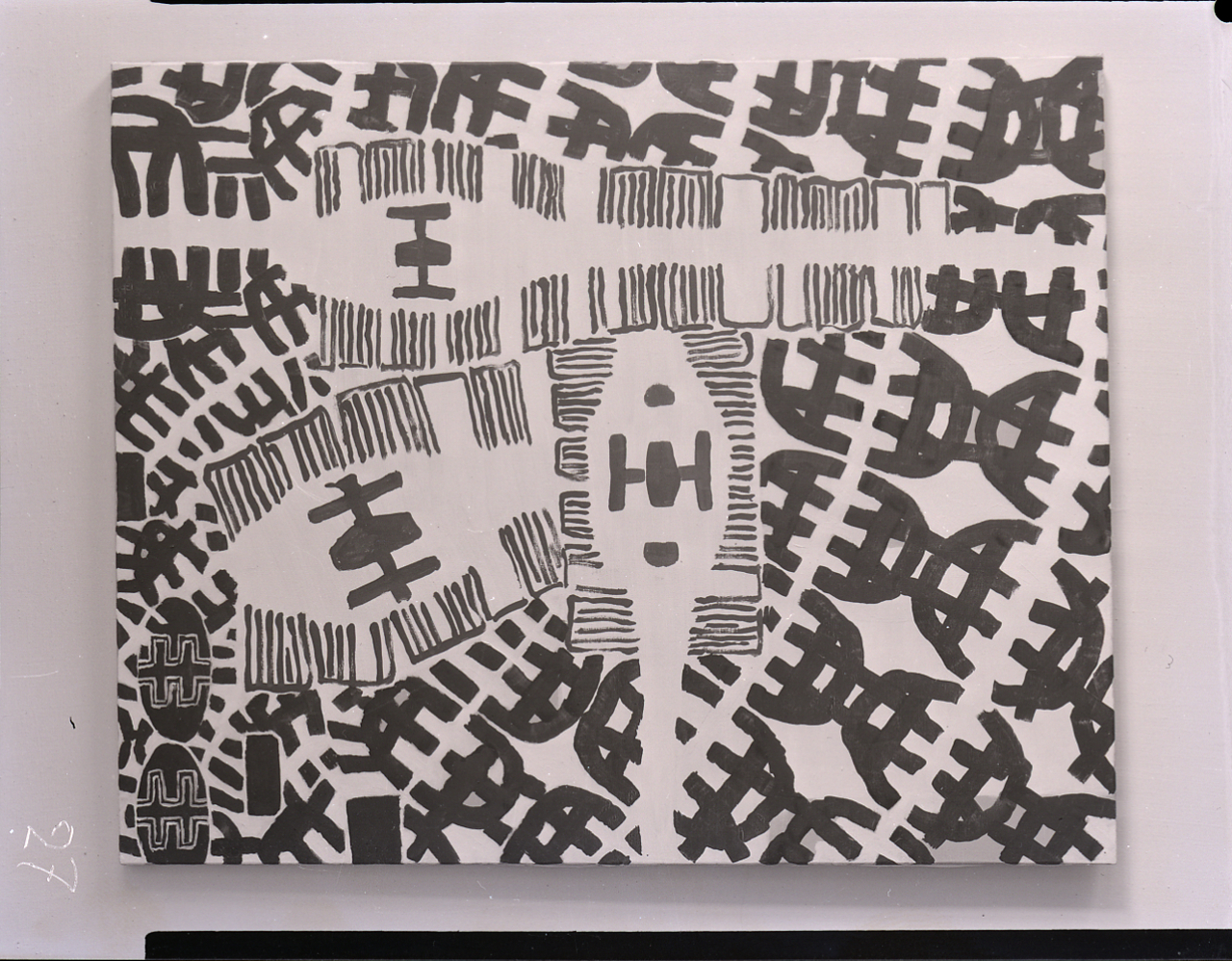
Painting by Capogrossi, 1972

== Selected bibliography ==
- Mantura, Bruno (1986). Fino al 1948. Rome.
- Fagiolo dell'Arco, Maurizio (1988). Scuola Romana: artisti tra le due guerre. Exhibition catalogue, Palazzo Reale, Milan. Milan: Mazzotta.
