= The Turn (novel) =

1902 novel by Luigi Pirandello

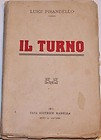
- The Turn
- Author: Luigi Pirandello
- Original title: Il Turno
- Language: Italian
- Genre: Novel
- Published: 1902 Niccolò Giannotta (orig.) & Newton Compton
- Publication place: Italy
- Media type: Print (Paperback)
- Pages: 50 pp
- OCLC: 35988380

For the film based on the novel, see "Il turno" The Turn (Italian: Il Turno [il ˈturno]) is Luigi Pirandello's second novel. Originally published in Catania in 1902 by the editor Niccolò Giannotta, it was republished by the Fratelli Treves publishing house, along with the novella Lontano, with the subtitle Novellas of Luigi Pirandello in 1915. The author seems to have considered it to be a long short story rather than a true novel, and, in the introduction to the 1915 edition, explained that the two stories were written in his early youth and judged them, saying, “…the one is gay if not light-hearted, and the other is sad". He maintained that their greatest merit consisted in "the open vivacity of representation."

== Plot ==
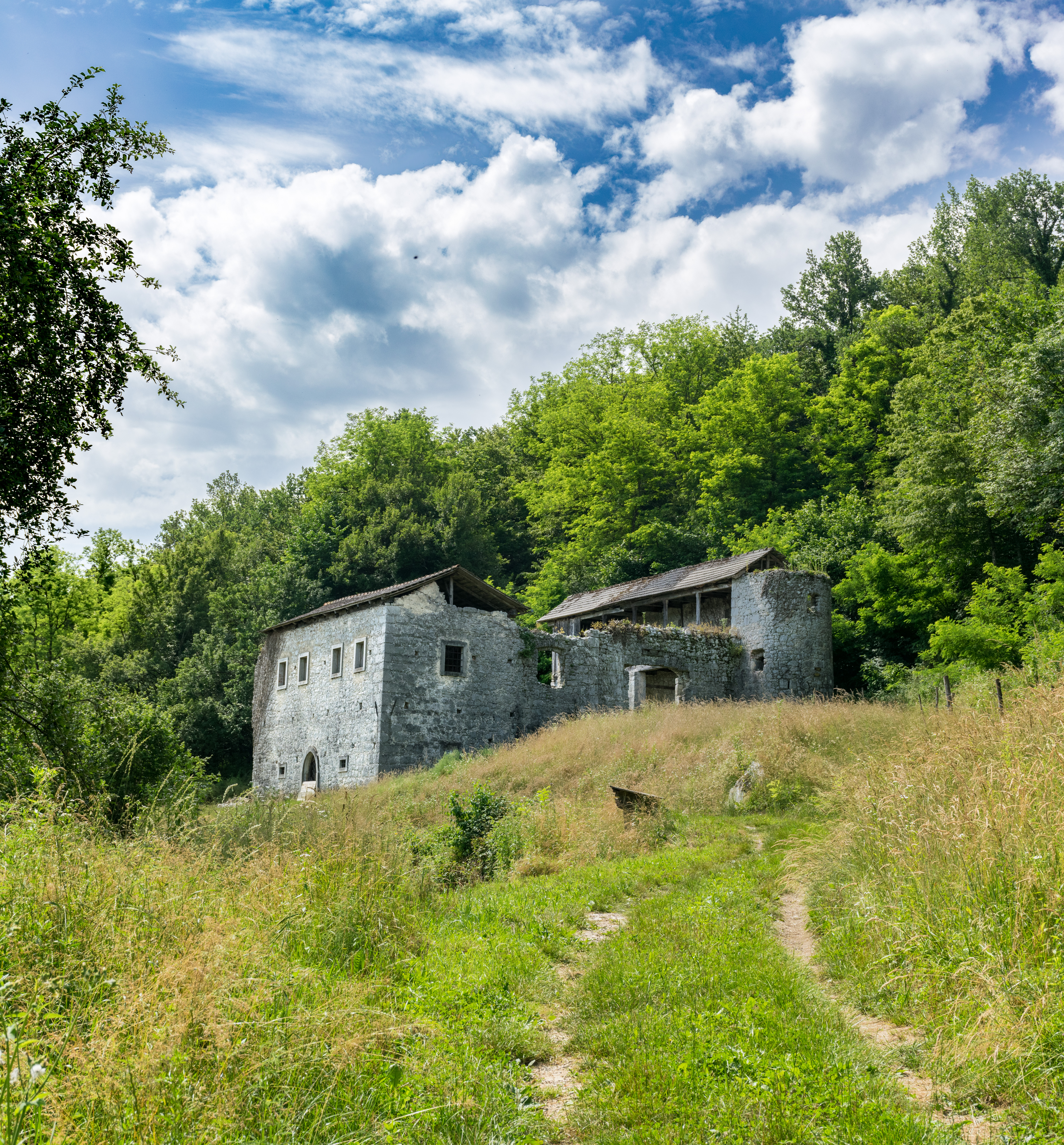
Castle Turn (28879328188)

The story is divided into thirty very short chapters which permit the author to rapidly change situations and environments, bringing alternatively to the forefront the different subjects involved in the singular plan conceived by Marcantonio Ravì, the cause of odd and unpredictable events. This overweight, tenacious father of Stellina has an idee fixe which will, he believes, bring about the happiness of his daughter: establish a turn. That is to say, he will give her over as wife to the aging and well-off Don Diego Alcozèr, and then, after his death, consign her, fabulously wealthy and contented, to her desperate but dirt poor admirer Pepè Alletto. Marcantonio is so convinced of the efficacy of this idea that he goes around the city talking about it to everyone in order to get their consent, obstinately insisting that he's right with the comic intercalation "ragioniamo!" (let's talk about this!). But the majority of the people he meets, as soon as they hear the name of the decrepit Alcozèr, "spit out a laugh." The proposition of the plan dominates the first chapter with the agitated figure of Marcantonio Ravì. His son-in-law in pectoris Diego Alcozèr, sprightly old man, widower of four wives and gaudy dandy with his "small watery furtive bald eyes", having already been "a conqueror of dames in crinoline from the epoch of Ferdinand II king of the Two Sicilies", emerges in the second chapter, where he excitedly chats with his future father-in-law about preparations for the surrender of Stellina. To these two "human stains" a third is added in the following chapter in which Pepè Alletto, the beneficiary of the "turn", takes the fore. What strikes the reader as curious is the fact that Marcantonio Ravì's plan takes him completely by surprise; in reality he it not a true "desperate admirer". He likes Stellina, but because of his lack of courage and his precarious economic conditions, he would never have dared to even think of marrying her. He is incapable of choosing and must always depend on the choices of others.

Pepé Alletto is the typical representative of a certain melancholic nobility of the provinces, deeply lazy and morally weak. He lives in the shadow of his aging mother who would never allow him to work (and he obviously adapts himself well to this situation) out of a misbegotten concept of the dignity of her state. Pepé passes the day taking care of his appearance, dreaming of the great city. The idea of the "turn" offers him an unexpected goal, a beautiful wife and a large heredity in view, the solution to all of his problems without too much work.

The marriage is filled with scenes of exhilarating comedy: the decrepit Don Diego wears for the occasion "the long napoleon which has survived through four weddings." Such antiquity contrasts miserably with the freshness of Stellina, whose appearance "illuminated the party." Pepé breaks through this dishonest and uncomfortable atmosphere of false compliments and badly dissimulated commiseration when, responding to the solicitations of the guests, he feels invested with the part of future husband and begins playing the piano, singing and conducting the dances. The hysterical crisis of Stellina, who faints after her ancient husband spills the rosolio onto her white dress because of the uncontrollable trembling of his hands, is the event that shatters the apparatus of hypocrisy that Marcantonio had laboriously constructed around himself. But he continues to awkwardly search for vain excuses while the guests hurry to get out of the party. From this point on events precipitate out of control as everything becomes a prey to chance: Pepé, the maldextrous cavalier, gets himself caught up in a duel in order to defend Stellina, a situation which he could have easily avoided had he not asked for help from his overweening and domineering brother-in-law, the lawyer Ciro Coppa, who insists that he must challenge his adversary or be looked on as a coward. Pepé loses and ends up seriously wounded, as he will lose Stellina herself after continually begging Cirro to intervene in his favour. After the death of his wife, Ciro, in fact, marries Stellina, who has lost her patience and can no longer wait for the death of her elderly husband, himself.

Ciro inserts himself arrogantly...in the turn, marrying Stellina and rendering her a slave to his insane jealousies. But, once again against all narrative expectations, the robust and optimistic lawyer dies before his time. His two sons and those of his sister must now stay with Pepé who, in the final scene, next to the corpse of his brother-in-law, squeezes them to his breast while waiting for a look of consensus from Stellina.

The last words of Marcantonio Ravì underscore the contradictions of chance, deus ex machina of the entire novel: "This one, who looked like a lion, look at him here: dead! And that old worm, healthy and full of life! Tomorrow the other one will marry Tina Mèndola, your good friend..." These are bitter words for him, especially if one remembers that Tina is the daughter of the hated Carmela Mèndola who insistently stigmatized the union between Stellina and the old Don Diego, defining it as "a mortal sin which cries out for vengeance!"

It's understandable why Pirandello defined the story as "gay if not light-hearted". The desire to play games exhausts itself in a firework of exhilarating invention; but in the background there is always the shadow of the discontent of each character, whose desires are never, and can never be, fulfilled. They are nullified by unpredictable and uncontrollable events.

== Works about Pirandello as novelist ==
- M. Alicata. I Romanzi di Pirandello. Primato. Rome. 1941.
- A. Janner. Pirandello novelliere. Rassegna Nazionale. Rome. 1932.
- L. Cremonte. Pirandello novelliere. La Nuova Italia. Florence. 1935.
- U. Appolonio. Luigi Pirandello, in Romanzieri e novellieri d'Italia nel Secolo XX. Vol. 1. Rome. Stanze del Libro. 1936.
- G. Petronio. Pirandello novelliere e la crisi del realismo. Lucca. Edizione Lucentia. 1950.
- I. Pancrazi. Luigi Pirandello narratore, in Scrittore di Oggi, III. Laterza. Bari. 1950.
