= Adolfo Laurenti =

Italian sculptor (1856–1944)

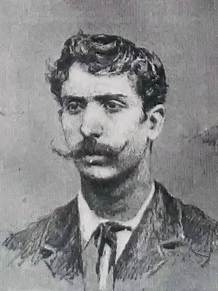
- Born: 1856; Monte Porzio Catone Lazio, Italy
- Died: 1944 (aged 87–88)
- Occupation: Sculptor

Adolfo Laurenti (1856–1944) was an Italian sculptor.

He was born in Monte Porzio Catone. He studied at the Accademia di San Luca in Rome. He sculpted a number of monuments around his home province and in the Lazio.

Laurenti was prolific in the production of portraits and monuments. At Turin, in 1880, he displayed busts of an Arab, and of a prophet (Augur) and a Roman senator (awarded a prize). In 1888 in Rome, he displayed Nero; Le smorfie dei satiri, e Una partita a palline sulle rive del Tevere. He sculpted a bust of Domenico Fernelli (1905) in bronze, located in the Giardini Nuvolari of Mantua.

In 1911 he completed the frieze il Corteo della Vita e del Lavoro on the right side of the Galleria Nazionale d'Arte Moderna in Rome for architect Cesare Bazzani.

Among his public works, are a fountain and Monument to Fallen (Caduti) (1926) in the Piazza Borghese; a Garibaldini (1883) in Piazza Porzio Catone; a monument to Silvio Spaventa (1899) located in Bomba, in province of Chieti; and finally a monument to the fallen in Piazzale Belvedre of Rocca Priora.
