= Galleria Nazionale d'Arte Moderna =

Museum of 19th–20th-century art in Rome

Galleria Nazionale d'Arte Moderna e Contemporanea
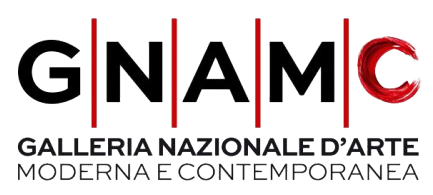

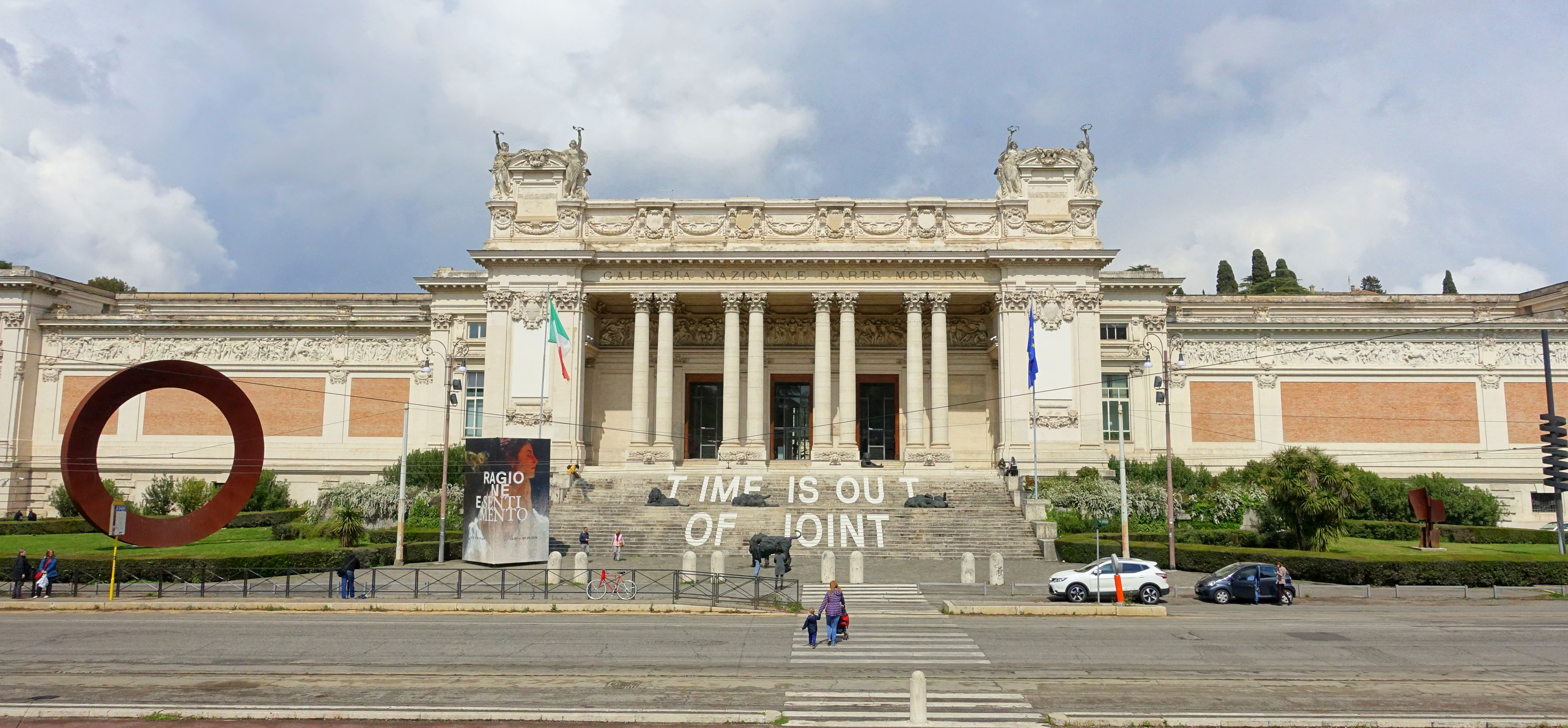
- Click on the map for a fullscreen view
- Established: 1883
- Location: Rome
- Coordinates: 41°55′01″N 12°28′56″E
- Type: Museum of 19th- and 20th-century art
- Director: Cristiana Collu
- Website: gnamc.cultura.gov.it

The Galleria Nazionale d'Arte Moderna e Contemporanea ('National Gallery of Modern and Contemporary Art'), also known as La Galleria Nazionale, is an art museum in Rome. It was founded in 1883 on the initiative of the then minister Guido Baccelli and is dedicated to modern and contemporary art.

== History ==
The present building, at 113 Via delle Belle Arti (near the Villa Giulia), was designed by Cesare Bazzani and was built between 1911 and 1915. On the façade are friezes by Ermenegildo Luppi, Adolfo Laurenti and Giovanni Prini, with four figures of Fame holding bronze wreaths sculpted by Adolfo Pantaresi and Albino Candoni.

The museum was expanded and doubled in size by Bazzani in 1934. A new building by Luigi Cosenza was inaugurated in 1988, but closed ten years later over safety concerns. A project developed by architects Diener & Diener in 1999 and 2000 was put on hold in 2003. In 2018 work was done to make the Cosenza building safe to use.

== The museum ==
The museum displays about 1100 paintings and sculptures of the nineteenth and twentieth centuries, of which it has the largest collection in Italy. Among the Italian artists represented are Giacomo Balla, Umberto Boccioni, Alberto Burri, Antonio Canova, Giorgio de Chirico, Lucio Fontana, Amedeo Modigliani, Giacomo Manzù, Vittorio Matteo Corcos, and Giorgio Morandi.

The museum also holds some works by foreign artists, among them Braque, Calder, Cézanne, Degas, Duchamp, Giacometti, Kandinsky, Mondrian, Monet, Jackson Pollock, Rodin, and Van Gogh.

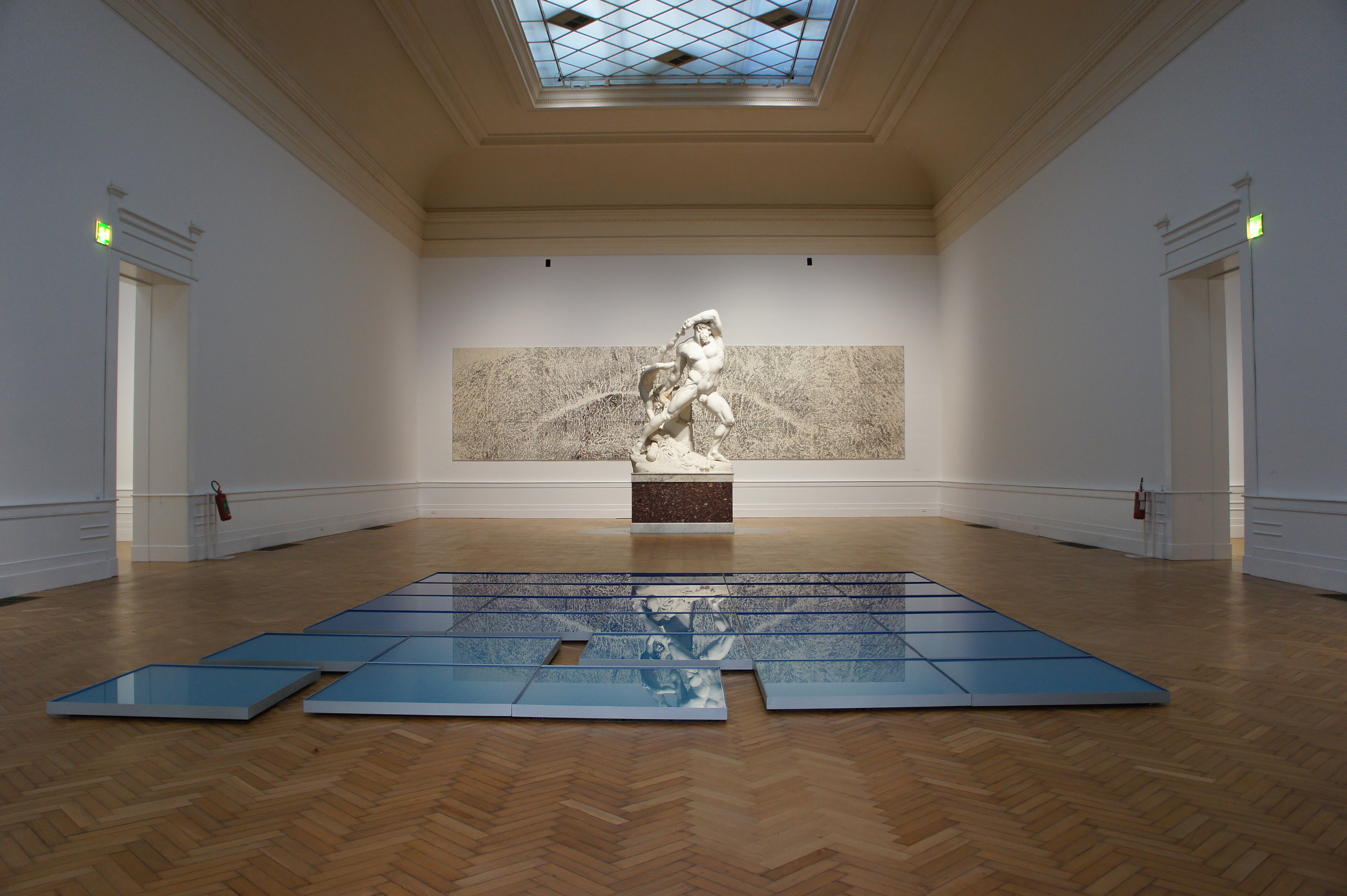
Interior, exhibition of Pino Pascali's 32 mq di mare circa (1967), Antonio Canova's Ettore e Lica (1815), and Giuseppe Penone's Spoglia d'oro su spine d'acacia (2002)

The Museo Boncompagni Ludovisi per le arti decorative, the Museo Hendrik C. Andersen, the Raccoltà Manzù, and the Museo Mario Praz form part of the Galleria Nazionale.

== See also ==
- List of national galleries
- List of museums in Italy

Preceded by Galleria Nazionale d'Arte Antica	Landmarks of Rome; Galleria Nazionale d'Arte Moderna	Succeeded by Giorgio de Chirico House Museum
