= Felice Carena =

Italian painter

Felice Carena (13 August 1879 – 10 June 1966) was an Italian painter.

== Biography ==
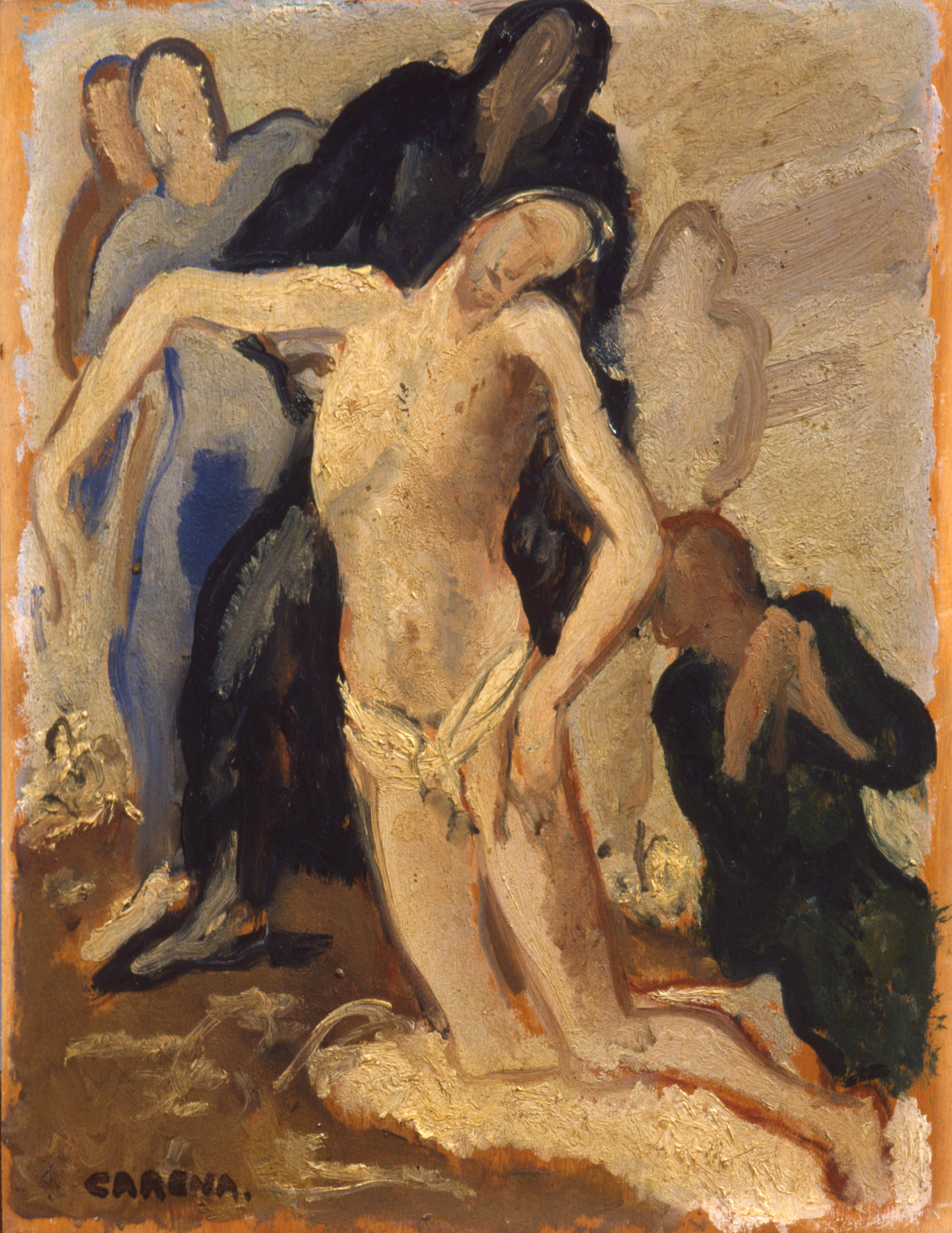
Felice Carena, Descent from the Cross, 1937-1938 ca, Museo Civico di Modena

Born at Cumiana, he studied in Turin's Accademia Albertina, where he attended symbolist poets such as Arturo Graf and Giovanni Cena. In 1906 he moved to Rome and in 1912 he exhibited his works at the Biennale di Venezia. In 1913–1915 he began to be influenced by the style of Cézanne and Matisse; in the World War I period Carena lived in Anticoli Corrado, a hamlet outside Rome.

In 1922 he created an art school in Rome and, two years later, he began to teach at the Florence Academy. In 1945 he moved to Venice, where he lived for the rest of his life.

Painters who studied under Carena include Giuseppe Capogrossi.
