= Ermenegildo Luppi =

Italian sculptor (1877–1937)

Ermenegildo Luppi (1877–1937) was an Italian sculptor.

Born in Modena, Luppi studied at the Academy of Fine Arts in his hometown under sculptor Giuseppe Gibellini. He moved to Rome in 1901, studying under Ettore Ferrari, and began exhibiting around 1903. After continuing his education in Florence in 1906 and 1907, Luppi returned to Rome permanently in 1907.

Winning increasingly important government commissions, Luppi graduated from producing freestanding statues for exhibition into architectural sculpture and war memorials. A tendency towards Fascist imagery and style is clear in his mid-1920s memorials for Modena and Avezzano, both with powerful central figures of Victory. Political content becomes explicit in 1934 at the Palazzo del Podestà, now the City Hall of Foggia, where Luppi contributed two sculpted exterior panels which both feature a muscular Mussolini in heroic poses.

Among other honours, Luppi was made a commander of the Order of the Crown of Italy and was elected to the Accademia di San Luca. He died in 1937.

== Work ==
Luppi's work includes:

- exterior frieze Corteo della Bellezza e della Forza, for the Galleria Nazionale d'Arte Moderna building, Rome, architect Cesare Bazzani (1911)
- Pieta, Cimitero di Brescia, Brescia (1922)
- Monument to the Fallen of Modena in the First World War, along Viale Martiri della Libertà, Modena (1923–1926; unveiled 1929)
- Monumento ai Caduti in Avezzano (1925–1928)
- seven of the historical busts in the gardens of the Janiculum, Rome (Gabriele Martucci della Spada, Luigi Miceli, Paolo Narducci, Domenico Piva, Ricciotti Garibaldi, Bernardino Serafini, and Augusto Valenzani, completed between 1925 and 1937)
- Dublin Lamentation, Dublin, Ireland, with sculptor A. Gardini (1930)
- Mussolini panels, Palazzo del Podestà, Foggia, for architect Armando Brasini (1932)
- Angel of Memory: a ten-foot-tall white marble statue by Luppi stands in the "Great Mausoleum" of Forest Lawn Memorial Park, Los Angeles, California, close to the grave of Elizabeth Taylor

== Gallery ==
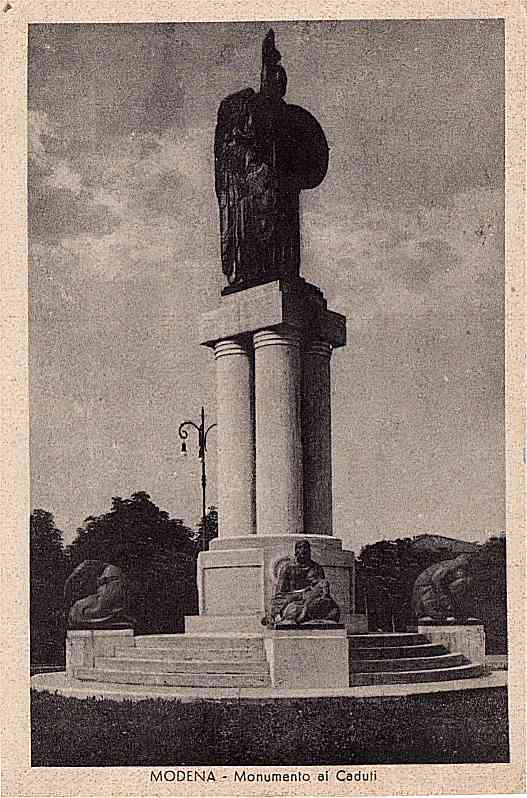
Modena war memorial

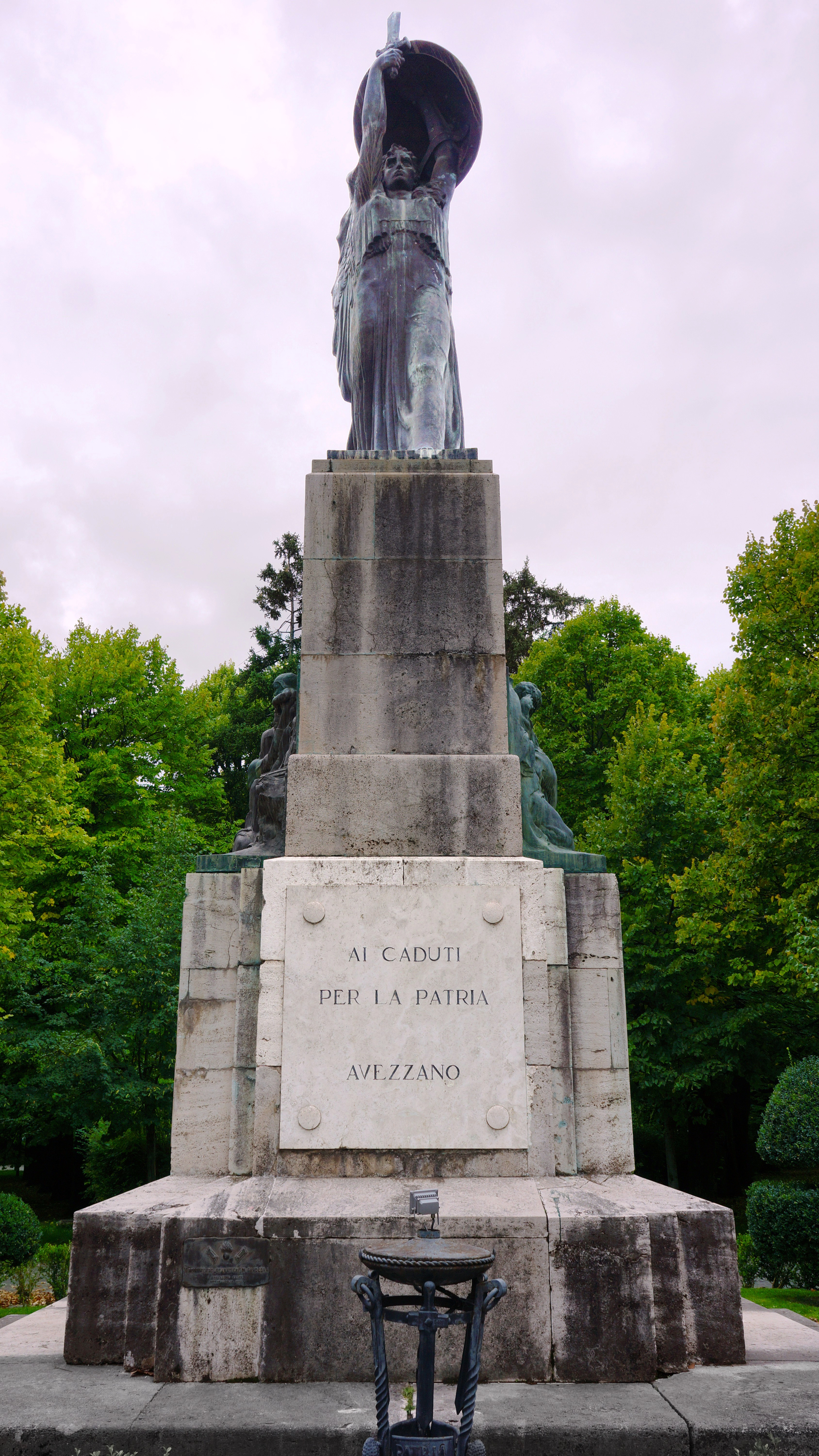
Avezzano war memorial

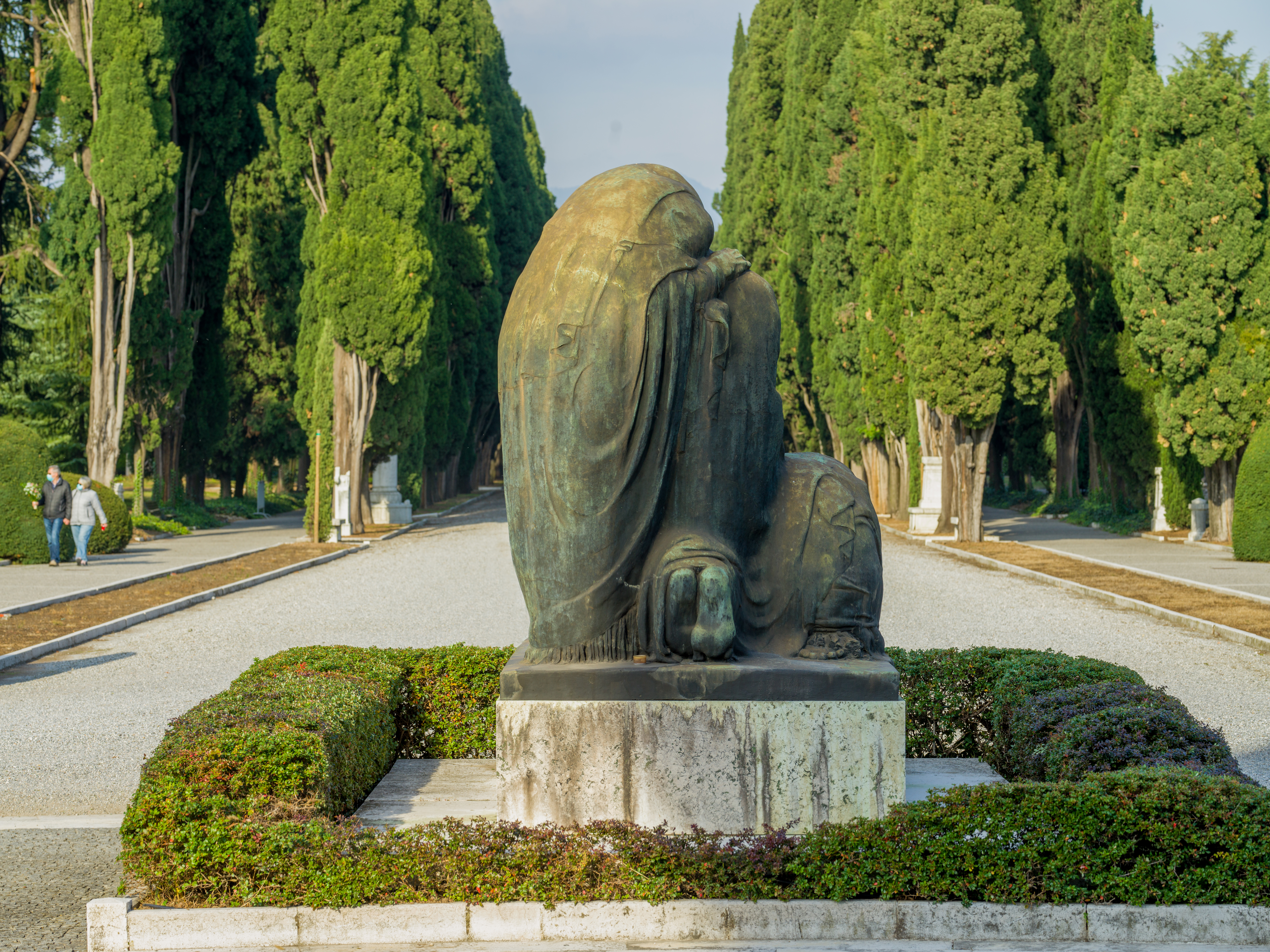
Pietà in the monumental cemetery in Brescia
