= Luigi Pirandello =

Sicilian dramatist, novelist, poet, short story writer (1867–1936)

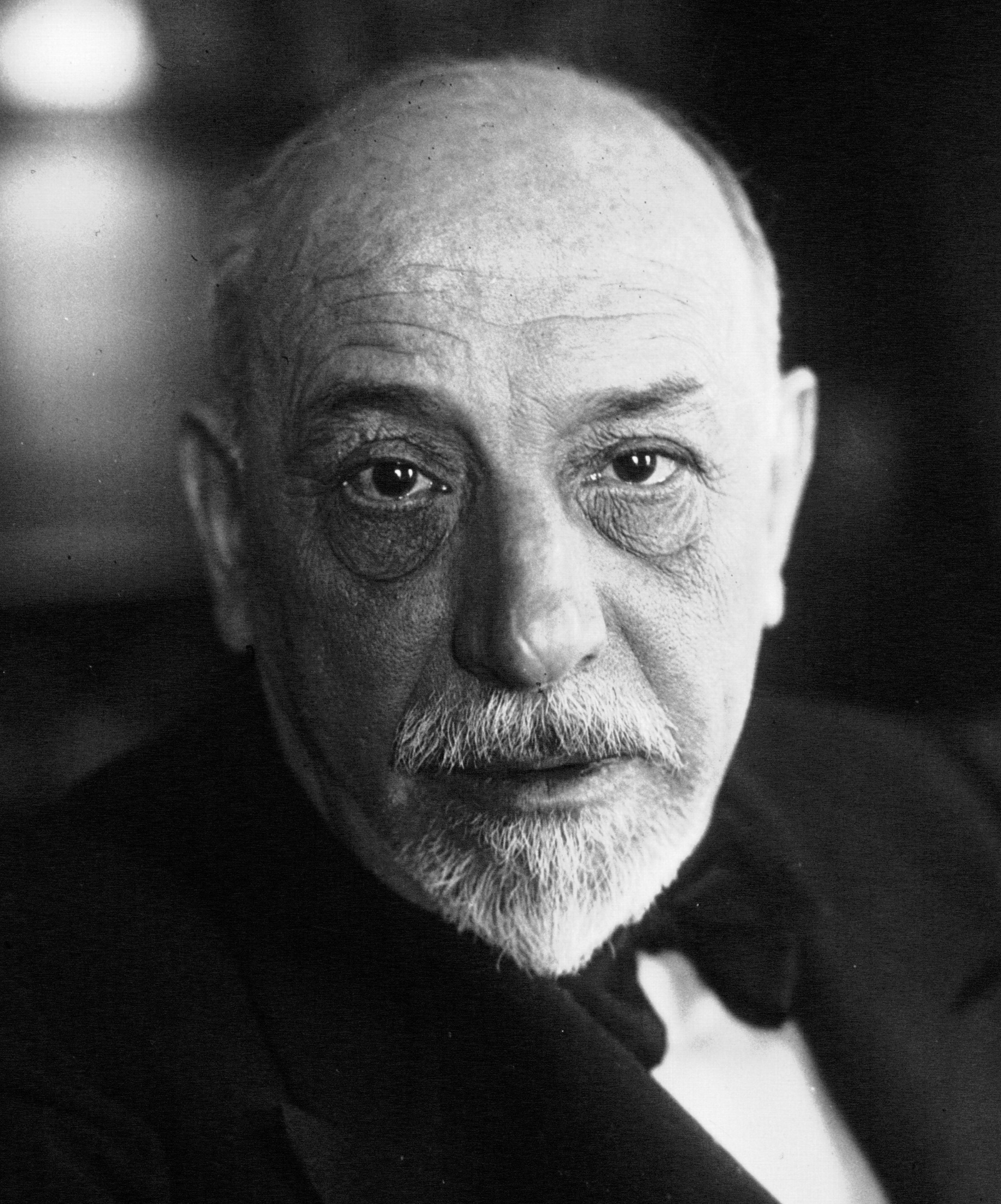
- Luigi Pirandello in 1932
- Born: 28 June 1867; Girgenti, Kingdom of Italy
- Died: 10 December 1936 (aged 69); Rome, Kingdom of Italy
- Education: University of Bonn
- Occupation: Writer
- Spouse: Maria Antonietta Portulano (m. 1894)
- Children: Stefano; Rosalia; Fausto
- Writing career
- Years active: 1893–1933
- Genres: Drama; novel; poetry
- Subjects: Insanity; humour
- Notable works: The Late Mattia Pascal (1904); Six Characters in Search of an Author (1921); Henry IV (1922); One, No One and One Hundred Thousand (1926)
- Notable awards: Nobel Prize in Literature; 1934
- Movement: Modernism

Signature
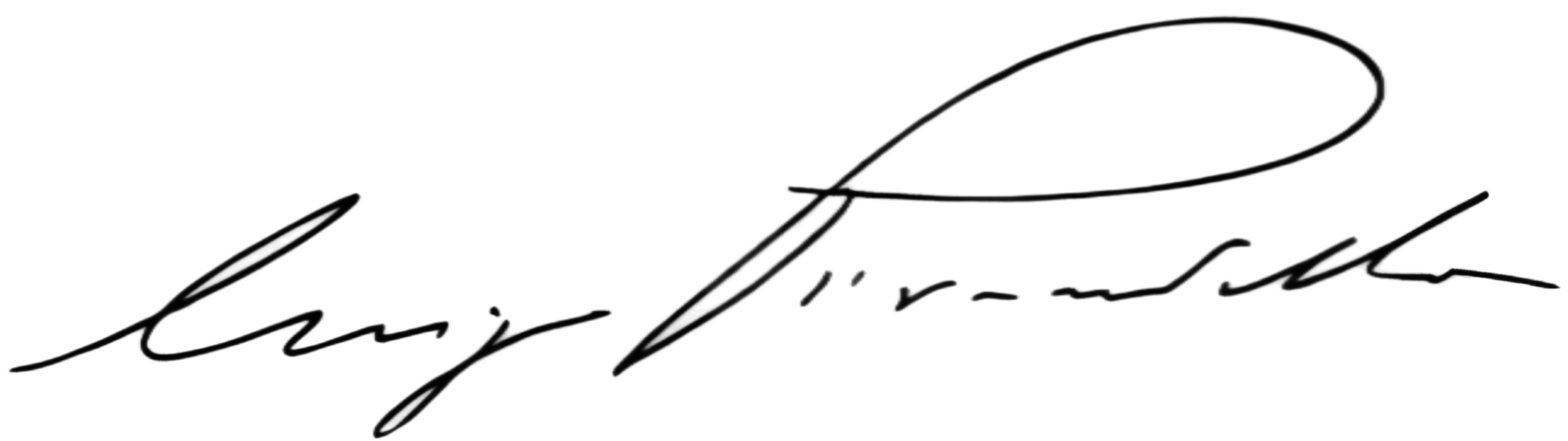

Luigi Pirandello (/ˌpɪrənˈdɛloʊ/ PIRR-ən-DEL-oh; Italian: [luˈiːdʒi piranˈdɛllo]; 28 June 1867 – 10 December 1936) was an Italian dramatist, novelist, poet, and short story writer most noted for his plays. He was awarded the 1934 Nobel Prize in Literature "for his bold and ingenious revival of dramatic and scenic art". Pirandello's works include novels, hundreds of short stories, and about 40 plays, some of which are written in Sicilian. Pirandello's tragic farces are often seen as forerunners of the Theatre of the Absurd.

Pirandello reading his work Six Characters in Search of an Author (1926)

== Biography ==
=== Early life ===
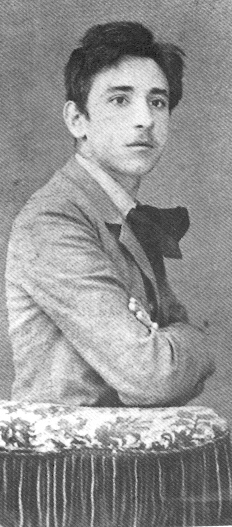
Pirandello in 1884

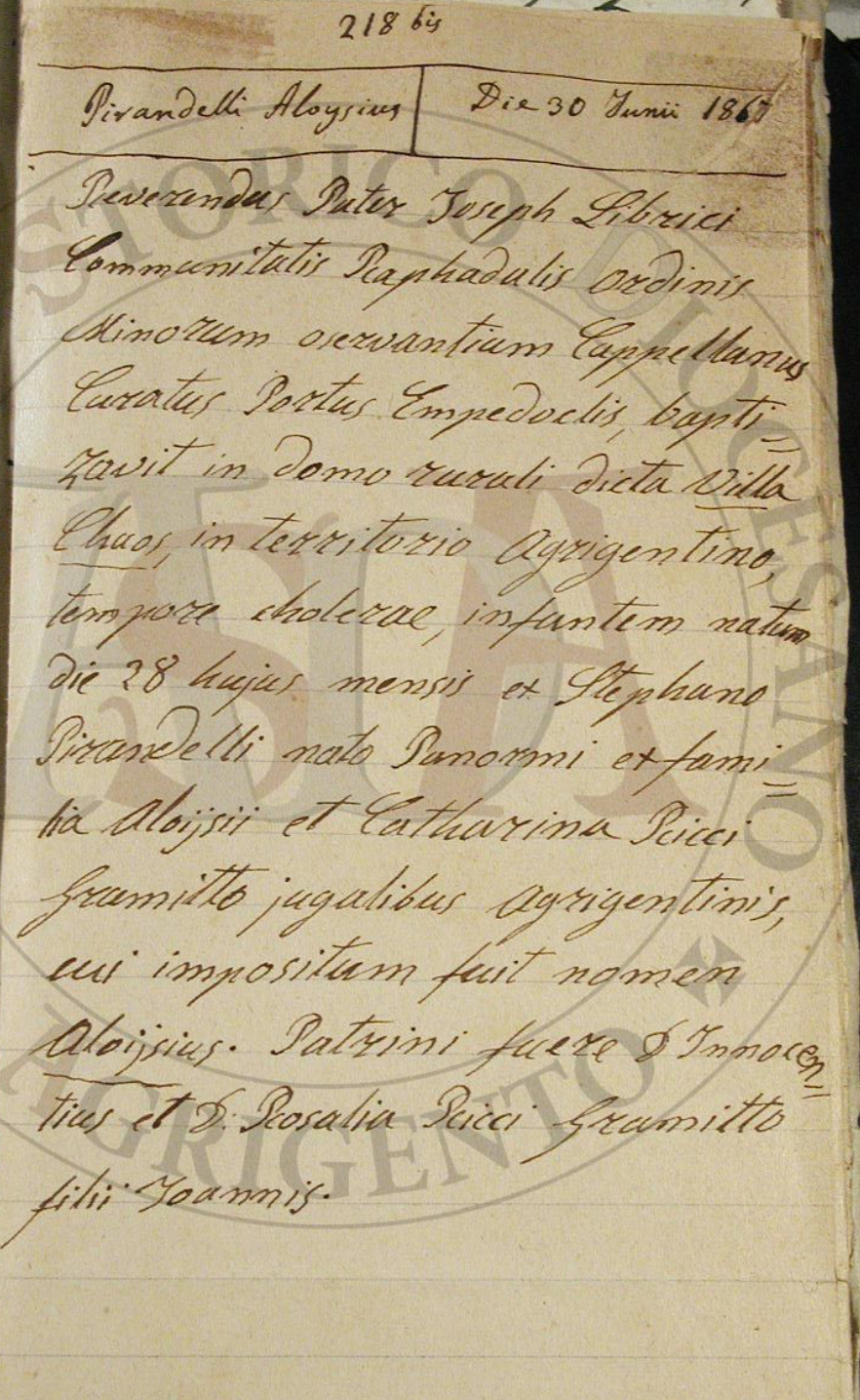
Luigi Pirandello Baptismal Certificate

Pirandello was born into an upper-class family in Girgenti (now Agrigento), Sicily, near the poor suburb of Porto Empedocle. His family's surname had originally been the Greek "Pirangelos" (Greek: Πυράγγελος), which had been phonetically corrupted. Pirandello was of Greek descent, as he noted himself in an interview to Kostas Ouranis in 1934.

The area of his birth was called "Caos", from càusi, Sicilian for "trousers", after the shape of a nearby ravine. His father, Stefano Pirandello, belonged to a wealthy family involved in the sulphur industry, and his mother, Caterina Ricci Gramitto, was also of a well-to-do background, descending from a family of the bourgeois professional class of Agrigento. Both families, the Pirandellos and the Ricci Gramittos, were ferociously anti-Bourbon and actively participated in the struggle for unification and democracy (Risorgimento). Stefano participated in the famous Expedition of the Thousand, later following Garibaldi all the way to the battle of Aspromonte, and Caterina, who had hardly reached the age of thirteen, was forced to accompany her father to Malta, where he had been sent into exile by the Bourbon monarchy. But the open participation in the Garibaldian cause and the strong sense of idealism of those early years were quickly transformed, above all in Caterina, into an angry and bitter disappointment with the new reality created by the unification. Pirandello would eventually assimilate this sense of betrayal and resentment and express it in several of his poems and in his novel The Old and the Young. It is also probable that this climate of disillusion inculcated in the young Luigi the sense of disproportion between ideals and reality which is recognizable in his essay on humorism (L'Umorismo).

L'Umorismo, 1908

Pirandello received his elementary education at home, but was much more fascinated by the fables and legends, somewhere between popular and magic, that his elderly servant Maria Stella used to recount to him than by anything scholastic or academic. By the age of twelve, he had already written his first tragedy. At the insistence of his father, he was registered at a technical school, but eventually switched to the study of the humanities at the ginnasio, something which had always attracted him.

In 1880, the Pirandello family moved to Palermo. It was here, in the capital of Sicily, that Luigi completed his high school education. He also began reading omnivorously, focusing, above all, on 19th-century Italian poets such as Giosuè Carducci and Arturo Graf. He then started writing his first poems and fell in love with his cousin Lina.

During this period, the first signs of serious differences arose between Luigi and his father; Luigi had discovered some notes revealing the existence of Stefano's extramarital relations. As a reaction to the ever-increasing distrust and disharmony that Luigi was developing toward his father, a man of a robust physique and crude manners, his attachment to his mother would continue growing to the point of profound veneration. This later expressed itself, after her death, in the moving pages of the novella Colloqui con i personaggi in 1915.

His romantic feelings for his cousin, initially looked upon with disfavour, were suddenly taken very seriously by Lina's family. They demanded that Luigi abandon his studies and dedicate himself to the sulphur business so that he could immediately marry her. In 1886, during a vacation from school, Luigi went to visit the sulphur mines of Porto Empedocle and started working with his father. This experience was essential to him and would provide the basis for such stories as Il Fumo, Ciàula scopre la Luna as well as some of the descriptions and background in the novel The Old and the Young. The marriage, which had seemed imminent, was postponed.

Pirandello then registered at the University of Palermo in the departments of Law and of Letters. The campus at Palermo, and above all the Department of Law, was the centre in those years of the vast movement which would eventually evolve into the Fasci Siciliani. Although Pirandello was not an active member of this movement, he had close ties of friendship with its leading ideologists: Rosario Garibaldi Bosco, Enrico La Loggia, Giuseppe De Felice Giuffrida and Francesco De Luca.

=== Higher education ===
In 1887, having definitively chosen the Department of Letters, he moved to Rome in order to continue his studies. But the encounter with the city, centre of the struggle for unification to which the families of his parents had participated with generous enthusiasm, was disappointing and nothing close to what he had expected. "When I arrived in Rome it was raining hard, it was night time and I felt like my heart was being crushed, but then I laughed like a man in the throes of desperation."

Pirandello, who was an extremely sensitive moralist, finally had a chance to see for himself the irreducible decadence of the so-called heroes of the Risorgimento in the person of his uncle Rocco, now a greying and exhausted functionary of the prefecture who provided him with temporary lodgings in Rome. The "desperate laugh", the only manifestation of revenge for the disappointment undergone, inspired the bitter verses of his first collection of poems, Mal Giocondo (1889). But not all was negative; this first visit to Rome provided him with the opportunity to assiduously visit the many theatres of the capital: Il Nazionale, Il Valle, il Manzoni. "Oh the dramatic theatre! I will conquer it. I cannot enter into one without experiencing a strange sensation, an excitement of the blood through all my veins..."

Because of a conflict with a Latin professor, he was forced to leave the University of Rome and went to Bonn with a letter of presentation from one of his other professors. The stay in Bonn, which lasted two years, was fervid with cultural life. He read the German romantics, Jean Paul, Tieck, Chamisso, Heinrich Heine and Goethe. He began translating the Roman Elegies of Goethe, composed the Elegie Boreali in imitation of the style of the Roman Elegies, and he began to meditate on the topic of humorism by way of the works of Cecco Angiolieri.

In March 1891 he received his doctorate in Romance Philology with a dissertation on the dialect of Agrigento: Sounds and Developments of Sounds in the Speech of Craperallis.

=== Marriage ===
After a brief sojourn in Sicily, during which the planned marriage with his cousin was finally called off, he returned to Rome, where he became friends with a group of writer-journalists including Ugo Fleres, Tomaso Gnoli, Giustino Ferri and Luigi Capuana. Capuana encouraged Pirandello to dedicate himself to narrative writing. In 1893 he wrote his first important work, Marta Ajala, which was published in 1901 as l'Esclusa. In 1894 he published his first collection of short stories, Amori senza Amore. He also married in 1894, choosing (on his father's suggestion) a shy, withdrawn girl of a good family of Agrigentine origin educated by the nuns of San Vincenzo: Maria Antonietta Portulano (1871–1959).

The first years of matrimony brought on in him a new fervour for his studies and writings: his encounters with his friends and the discussions on art continued, more vivacious and stimulating than ever, while his family life, despite the complete incomprehension of his wife with respect to the artistic vocation of her husband, proceeded relatively tranquilly with the birth of two sons (Stefano and Fausto) and a daughter (Rosalia "Lietta"). In the meantime, Pirandello intensified his collaborations with newspaper editors and other journalists in magazines such as La Critica and La Tavola Rotonda in which he published, in 1895, the first part of the Dialoghi tra Il Gran Me e Il Piccolo Me.

In 1897 he accepted an offer to teach Italian at the Istituto Superiore di Magistero di Roma, and in the magazine Il Marzocco he published several more pages of the Dialoghi. In 1898, with Italo Falbo and Ugo Fleres, he founded the weekly Ariel, in which he published the one-act play L'Epilogo (later changed to La Morsa) and some novellas (La Scelta, Se...). The end of the 19th century and the beginnings of the 20th were a period of extreme productivity for Pirandello. In 1900, he published in Il Marzocco some of the most celebrated of his novellas (Lumie di Sicilia, La Paura del Sonno...) and, in 1901, the collection of poems Zampogna. In 1902 he published the first series of Beffe della Morte e della Vita and his second novel, Il Turno.

=== Family disaster ===
The year 1903 was fundamental to the life of Pirandello. The flooding of the sulphur mines of Aragona, in which his father Stefano had invested not only an enormous amount of his own capital but also Antonietta's dowry, precipitated the financial collapse of the family. Antonietta, after opening and reading the letter announcing the catastrophe, entered into a state of semi-catatonia and underwent such a psychological shock that her mental balance remained profoundly and irremediably shaken.

Pirandello, who had initially harboured thoughts of suicide, attempted to remedy the situation as best he could by increasing the number of his lessons in both Italian and German and asking for compensation from the magazines to which he had freely given away his writings and collaborations. In the magazine New Anthology, directed by G. Cena, meanwhile, the novel which Pirandello had been writing while in this horrible situation (watching over his mentally ill wife at night after an entire day spent at work) began appearing in episodes. The title was Il Fu Mattia Pascal (The Late Mattia Pascal). This novel contains many autobiographical elements that have been fantastically re-elaborated. It was an immediate and resounding success. Translated into German in 1905, this novel paved the way to the notoriety and fame which allowed Pirandello to publish with the more important firms such as Treves, with whom he published, in 1906, another collection of novellas Erma Bifronte. In 1908 he published a volume of essays entitled Arte e Scienza and the important essay L'Umorismo, in which he initiated the legendary debate with Benedetto Croce that would continue with increasing bitterness and venom on both sides for many years.

In 1905 he took his wife to stay in Chianciano Terme together with their children where they stayed for two months in what the writer described as "the village nestled on the windy hill just opposite the Collegiata". Two short stories contained in the book Short Stories for a Year are set in this town: "Bitter Water" and "Pallino and Mimì".

In 1909 the first part of I Vecchi e I Giovani was published in episodes. This novel retraces the history of the failure and repression of the Fasci Siciliani in the period from 1893 to 1894. When the novel came out in 1913 Pirandello sent a copy of it to his parents for their fiftieth wedding anniversary along with a dedication which said that "their names, Stefano and Caterina, live heroically." However, while the mother is transfigured in the novel into the otherworldly figure of Caterina Laurentano, the father, represented by the husband of Caterina, Stefano Auriti, appears only in memories and flashbacks, since, as was observed by Leonardo Sciascia, "he died censured in a Freudian sense by his son who, in the bottom of his soul, is his enemy." Also in 1909, Pirandello began his collaboration with the prestigious journal Corriere della Sera in which he published the novellas Mondo di Carta (World of Paper), La Giara, and, in 1910, Non è una cosa seria and Pensaci, Giacomino! (Think it over, Giacomino!). At this point Pirandello's fame as a writer was continually increasing. His private life, however, was poisoned by the suspicion and obsessive jealousy of Antonietta who began turning physically violent.

In 1911, while the publication of novellas and short stories continued, Pirandello finished his fourth novel, Suo Marito, republished posthumously (1941), and completely revised in the first four chapters, with the title Giustino Roncella nato Boggiòlo. During his life the author never republished this novel for reasons of discretion (within are implicit references to the writer Grazia Deledda). But the work which absorbed most of his energies at this time was the collection of stories La vendetta del cane, Quando s'è capito il giuoco, Il treno ha fischiato, Filo d'aria and Berecche e la guerra. They were all published from 1913 to 1914 and are all now considered classics of Italian literature.

=== First World War ===
As Italy entered the First World War, Pirandello's son Stefano volunteered for service and was taken prisoner by the Austro-Hungarians. In 1916 the actor Angelo Musco successfully recited the three-act comedy that the writer had extracted from the novella Pensaci, Giacomino! and the pastoral comedy Liolà.

In 1917 the collection of novellas E domani Lunedì (And Tomorrow, Monday...) was published, but the year was mostly marked by important theatrical representations: Così è (se vi pare) (Right you are (if you think so)), A birrita cu' i ciancianeddi and Il Piacere dell'onestà (The Pleasure Of Honesty). A year later, Ma non è una cosa seria (But It's Nothing Serious) and Il Gioco delle Parti (The Game of Roles) were all produced on stage. Pirandello's son Stefano returned home when the war ended.

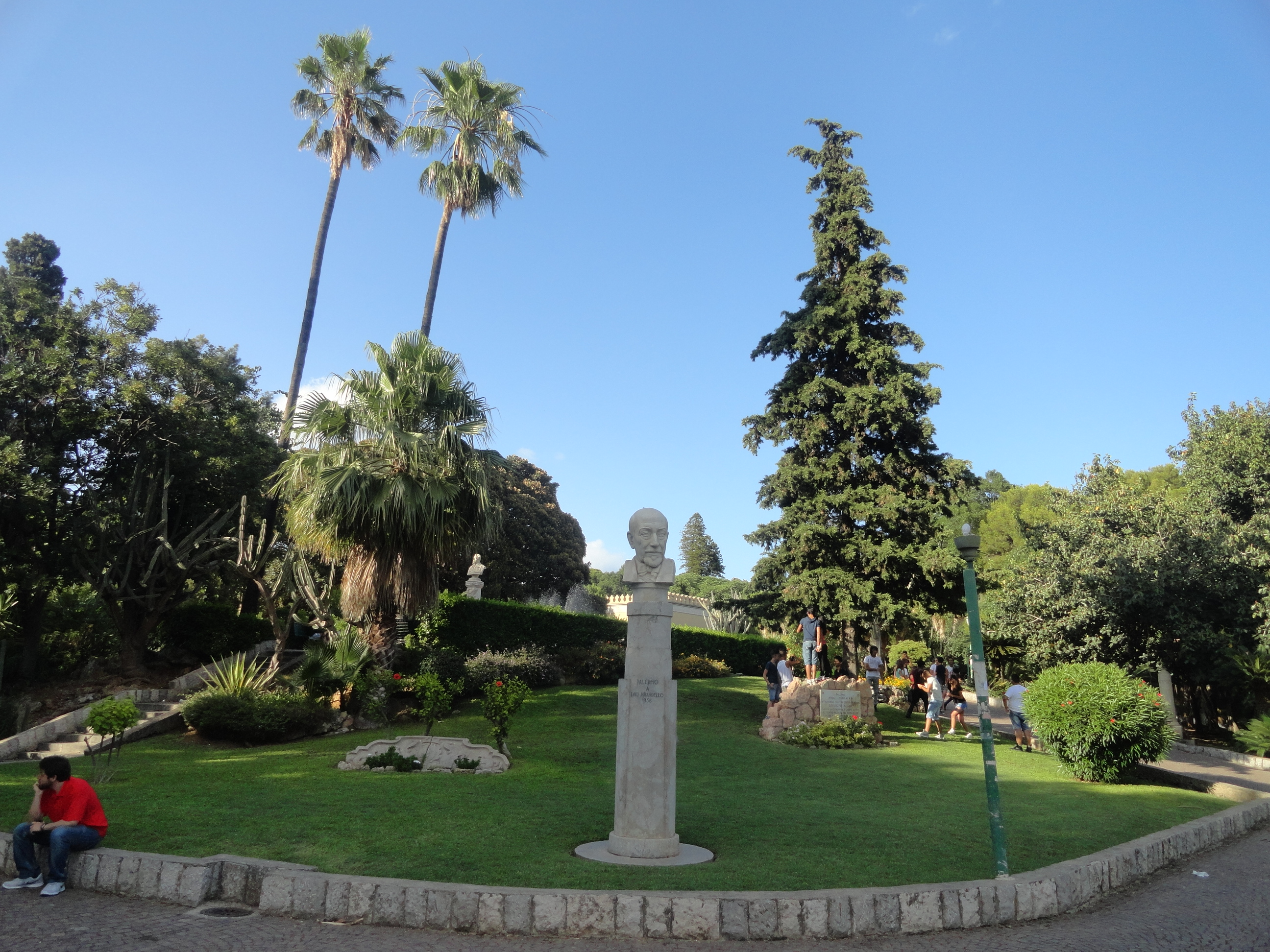
Bust of Pirandello in the Giardino Inglese park in Palermo

In 1919 Pirandello had his wife placed in an asylum. The separation from his wife, despite her morbid jealousies and hallucinations, caused great suffering for Pirandello who, even as late as 1924, believed he could still properly care for her at home. She never left the asylum.

1920 was the year of comedies such as Tutto per bene, Come prima meglio di prima, and La Signora Morli. In 1921, the Compagnia di Dario Niccodemi staged, at the Valle di Roma, the play, Sei Personaggi in Cerca d'Autore, Six Characters in Search of an Author. It was a clamorous failure. The public divided into supporters and adversaries, the latter of whom shouted, "Asylum, Asylum!" The author, who was present at the performance with his daughter Lietta, left through a side exit to avoid the crowd of enemies. The same drama, however, was a great success when presented in Milan. In 1922 in Milan, Enrico IV was performed for the first time and was acclaimed universally as a success. Pirandello's international reputation was developing as well. The Sei personaggi was performed in London and New York.

=== Italy under the Fascists ===
Pirandello was an Italian nationalist and supported Italian fascism in a moderate way. In 1924, he wrote a letter to Benito Mussolini asking him to be accepted as a member of the National Fascist Party. In 1925 Pirandello, with the help of Mussolini, assumed the artistic direction and ownership of the Teatro d'Arte di Roma, founded by the Gruppo degli Undici. He described himself as "a Fascist because I am Italian." For his devotion to Mussolini, the satirical magazine Il Becco Giallo used to call him P. Randello (randello in Italian means cudgel).

He expressed publicly apolitical belief, saying "I'm apolitical, I'm only a man in the world." During these years, he had continuous conflicts with fascist leaders. In 1927 he tore his fascist membership card to pieces in front of the startled secretary-general of the Fascist Party. For the remainder of his life, Pirandello was always under close surveillance by the secret fascist police OVRA.

His play, I Giganti della Montagna (The Giants of the Mountain), has been interpreted as evidence of his realization that the fascists were hostile to culture; yet, during a later appearance in New York, Pirandello distributed a statement announcing his support of Italy's annexation of Abyssinia. He then gave his Nobel Prize medal to the Fascist government to be melted down as part of the 1935 Oro alla Patria (Gold to the Fatherland) campaign during the Second Italo-Ethiopian War.

Pirandello's conception of the theatre underwent a significant change at this point. The idea of the actor as an inevitable betrayer of the text, as in the Sei Personaggi, gave way to the identification of the actor with the character that they play. The company took their act throughout the major cities of Europe, and the Pirandellian repertoire became increasingly well known. Between 1925 and 1926 Pirandello's last and perhaps greatest novel, Uno, Nessuno e Centomila (One, No one and One Hundred Thousand), was published serially in the magazine La Fiera Letteraria. He was one of the contributors of the nationalist women's magazine, Lidel, and the Fascist daily Il Tevere.

== Legacy ==
On 14 July 1930, a version of his short play The Man with the Flower in His Mouth, adapted and produced by Lance Sieveking, co-produced with John Logie Baird's company and starring Val Gielgud and Lionel Millard, became the first drama broadcast in both picture and sound when the British Broadcasting Corporation showed it for London audiences.

Pirandello was nominated Academic of Italy in 1929, and in 1934 he was awarded the Nobel Prize for Literature after he had been nominated by Guglielmo Marconi, member of the Royal Academy of Italy. He was the last Italian playwright to be chosen for the award until Dario Fo won on 9 October 1997.

Pirandello died alone in his home at Via Bosio, Rome, on 10 December 1936. He refused a State funeral offered by Mussolini and only in 1947 were his cremated remains buried in Sicily.

In the context of playwriting during the early and mid-1900s, Pirandello's impact is notable. Pirandello inspired playwrights such as Samuel Beckett and Harold Pinter to write plays that echo the themes of existential exploration and metaphysical questioning that he focused on in his works. His influence goes beyond playwrights; French philosopher Jean-Paul Sartre was also inspired by Pirandello's ideas to explore one of the main pillars of his philosophy: existentialism. The playwright's portrayal of fractured identities and the ambiguity of existence in his plays served as inspiration for Sartre's concepts of freedom, authenticity, and existential angst. Pirandello's character narratives and metaphysical themes not only aligned with but also enriched Sartre's philosophical discourses, creating a link between existential thought in theater and philosophy, where each medium deepened and reflected upon the complexities and theories of the other. The dialogues between self and other, freedom and responsibility, authenticity and bad faith, found meaning in the intersection of their respective domains. His legacy pushes further reflection into the complexities of characters, human consciousness, and identity.

== Selected works ==
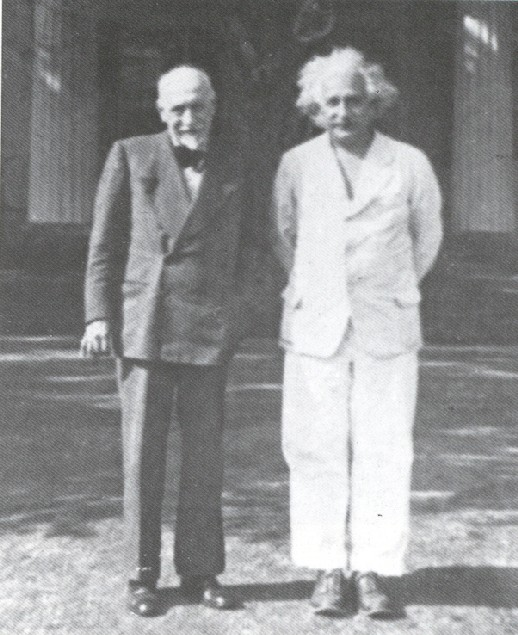
Pirandello with his friend Albert Einstein in 1935

=== Major plays ===
- 1916: Liolà
- 1917: Così è (se vi pare) (So It Is (If You Think So))
- 1917: Il piacere dell'onestà (The Pleasure of Honesty)
- 1918: Il gioco delle parti (The Rules of the Game)
- 1919: L'uomo, la bestia e la virtù (Man, Beast and Virtue)
- 1921: Sei personaggi in cerca d'autore (Six Characters in Search of an Author)
- 1922: Enrico IV (Henry IV)
- 1922: L'imbecille (The Imbecile)
- 1922: Vestire gli ignudi (To Clothe the Naked)
- 1923: L'uomo dal fiore in bocca (The Man with the Flower in His Mouth)
- 1923: L'altro figlio (The Other Son)
- 1923: La vita che ti diedi (The Life I Gave You)
- 1924: Ciascuno a suo modo (Each in His Own Way)
- 1924: Sagra del Signore della Nave (The Rite of the Lord of the Ship)
- 1926: L'Amica delle Mogli (The Friend of the Wives)
- 1926: Bellavita (Bellavita)
- 1927: Diana e la Tuda (Diana and Tuda)
- 1929: O di Uno o di Nessuno (Either of One or of None)
- 1929: Come Tu Mi Vuoi (How You Love Me)
- 1930: Questa sera si recita a soggetto (Tonight We Improvise)

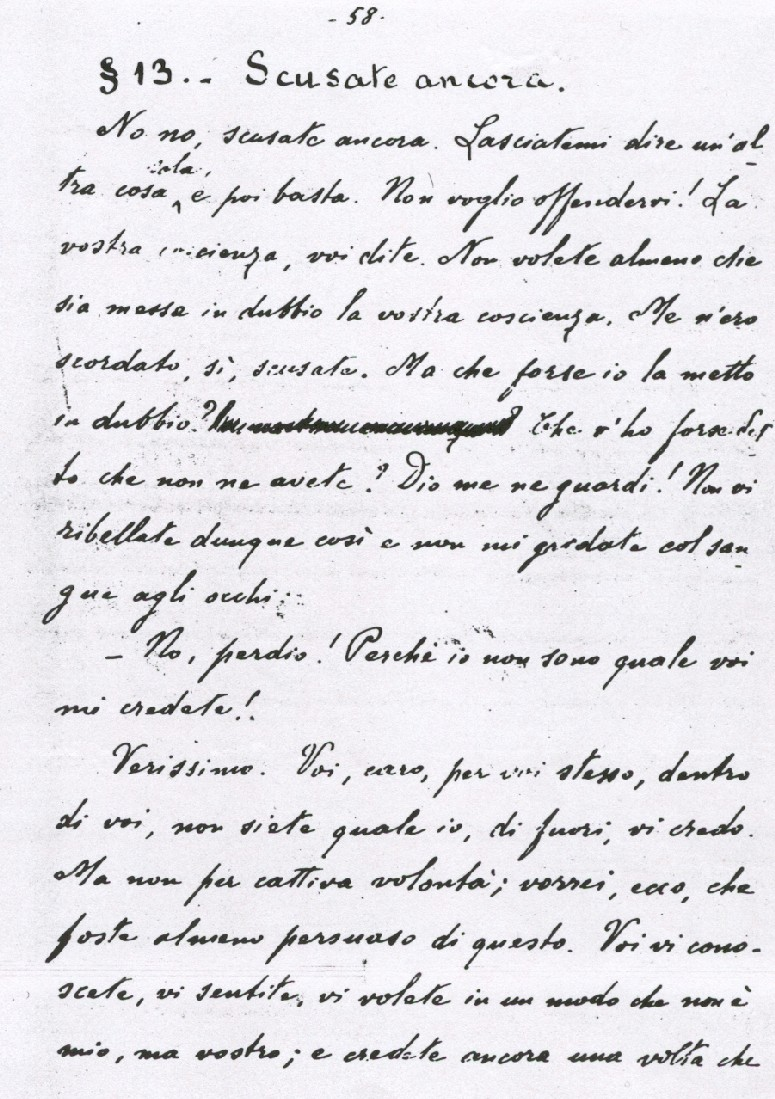
Original text of the most famous novel of Pirandello (One, No One and One Hundred Thousand)

=== Novels ===
- 1902: The Turn (original title: Il turno)
- 1904: The Late Mattia Pascal (original title: Il fu Mattia Pascal)
- 1908: The Outcast (original title L'esclusa)
- 1911: Suo marito (Her Husband)
- 1913: I vecchi e i giovani (The Old and the Young)
- 1915: Si Gira, Quaderni di Serafino Gubbio (Shoot!, The Notebooks of Serafino Gubbio, Cinematograph Operator, 1926 English translation by C. K. Scott Moncrieff)
- 1926: One, No One and One Hundred Thousand (original title: Uno, nessuno e centomila)

=== Short stories ===
- 1922–37: Novelle per un anno (Short Stories for a Year), 15 volumes. A selection of thirty stories was translated by Virginia Jewiss as Stories for the Years (Yale, 2021).

=== Poetry ===
- 1889: Mal giocondo (Playful Evil)
- 1891: Pasqua di Gea (Easter of Gea)
- 1894: Pier Gudrò, 1809–1892
- 1895: Elegie renane, 1889–90 (Rheinland Elegies)
- 1901: Zampogna (The Bagpipe)
- 1909: Scamandro
- 1912: Fuori di chiave (Out of Tune)

=== English translations ===
Nearly all of Pirandello's plays were translated into English by the actor Robert Rietti. Pirandello's poetry was translated for the first time in 2016 by George Hochfield. William Weaver is a noted translator of Luigi Pirandello. Frederick May translated a number of Pirandello's plays and short stories in editions published by Oxford University Press and Penguin Books.

== Filmography ==
- Il crollo, directed by Mario Gargiulo (Italy, 1920, based on the play Lumie di Sicilia)
- Il lume dell'altra casa, directed by Ugo Gracci (Italy, 1920, based on the short story Il lume dell'altra casa)
- Lo scaldino, directed by Augusto Genina (Italy, 1920, based on the short story Lo scaldino)
- But It Isn't Serious, directed by Augusto Camerini (Italy, 1921, based on the play Ma non è una cosa seria)
- La rosa, directed by Arnaldo Frateili (Italy, 1921, based on the short story La rosa)
- The Voyage, directed by Gennaro Righelli (Italy, 1921, based on the short story Il viaggio)
- Feu Mathias Pascal, directed by Marcel L'Herbier (France, 1925, based on the novel Il fu Mattia Pascal)
- The Flight in the Night, directed by Amleto Palermi (Germany, 1926, based on the play Enrico IV)
- The Song of Love, directed by Gennaro Righelli (Italy, 1930, based on the short story In silenzio)
  - La Dernière berceuse, directed by Gennaro Righelli and Jean Cassagne (France, 1931, based on the short story In silenzio)
  - Liebeslied, directed by Constantin J. David (Germany, 1931, based on the short story In silenzio)
- As You Desire Me, directed by George Fitzmaurice (1932, based on the play Come tu mi vuoi)
- Steel, directed by Walter Ruttmann (Italy, 1933, based on the story Giuoca, Pietro!)
- Pensaci, Giacomino!, directed by Gennaro Righelli (Italy, 1936, based on the play Pensaci, Giacomino!)
- But It's Nothing Serious, directed by Mario Camerini (Italy, 1936, based on the play Ma non è una cosa seria)
  - The Man Who Couldn't Say No, directed by Mario Camerini (Germany, 1938, based on the play Ma non è una cosa seria)
- The Man from Nowhere, directed by Pierre Chenal (France, 1937, based on the novel Il fu Mattia Pascal)
  - The Former Mattia Pascal, directed by Pierre Chenal (Italy, 1937, based on the novel Il fu Mattia Pascal)
- No Man's Land, directed by Mario Baffico (Italy, 1939, based on two short stories)
- Enrico IV, directed by Giorgio Pastina (Italy, 1943, based on the play Enrico IV)
- This Love of Ours, directed by William Dieterle (1945, based on the play Come prima, meglio di prima)
- Man, Beast and Virtue, directed by Steno (Italy, 1953, based on the play L'uomo, la bestia e la virtù)
- Of Life and Love, directed by Aldo Fabrizi, Giorgio Pastina, Mario Soldati and Luigi Zampa (Italy, 1954, based on four short stories)
- Vestire gli ignudi, directed by Marcello Pagliero (Italy, 1954, based on the play Vestire gli ignudi)
- Never Say Goodbye, directed by Jerry Hopper (1956, based on the play Come prima, meglio di prima)
- Todo sea para bien, directed by Carlos Rinaldi (Argentina, 1957, based on the play Tutto per bene)
- Liolà, directed by Alessandro Blasetti (Italy, 1963, based on the play Liolà)
- The Voyage, directed by Vittorio De Sica (Italy, 1974, based on the short story Il viaggio)
- Il turno, directed by Tonino Cervi (Italy, 1981, based on the novel Il turno)
- Henry IV, directed by Marco Bellocchio (Italy, 1984, based on the play Enrico IV)
- Kaos, directed by Paolo and Vittorio Taviani (Italy, 1984, based on four short stories)
- Wir, directed by Henryk Jacek Schoen (Poland, 1984, based on two short stories)
- The Two Lives of Mattia Pascal, directed by Mario Monicelli (Italy, 1985, based on the novel Il fu Mattia Pascal)
- You Laugh, directed by Paolo and Vittorio Taviani (Italy, 1998, based on two short stories)
- The Nanny, directed by Marco Bellocchio (Italy, 1999, based on the short story La balia)
- The Choice, directed by Michele Placido (Italy, 2015, based on the play L'innesto)
- The Wait, directed by Piero Messina (Italy, 2015, based on the play La vita che ti diedi)
- A Respectable Woman, directed by Bernard Émond (Canada, 2023, based on the short story "Pena di vivere cosi")
