= Stefano Pirandello =

Italian playwright and writer (1895–1972)

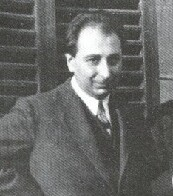
- Pirandello in 1931
- Born: 14 June 1895; Rome, Kingdom of Italy
- Died: 5 February 1972 (aged 76); Rome, Italy
- Other name: Stefano Landi
- Father: Luigi Pirandello
- Relatives: Fausto Pirandello (brother)

Stefano Pirandello (14 June 1895 – 5 February 1972) was an Italian playwright and writer, also known under the pen name Stefano Landi.

== Life and career ==
Born in Rome, the son of the Nobel Prize winner Luigi, Pirandello enrolled in the Faculty of Letters at the Sapienza University, but left his studies in 1915 to enlist as a volunteer in the World War I. Almost immediately captured by the Austrian army, he remained imprisoned between Mauthausen and Planá until the end of the war. After the war, he started collaborating with various publications as a journalist and a short story author, using the pseudonym Stefano Landi, and also served as secretary, administrator, literary agent, collaborator and sometimes co-author of his father. In 1923 he made his debut as a dramatist with the one-act play I bambini, followed from his best-known drama, the autobiographical La casa a due piani ("The two-storey house"), first staged at the Teatro Argentina by Dario Niccodemi's theatre company.

In 1933 Pirandello wrote the short story Giuoca, Pietro!, later credited to his father and used as basis for the film Steel. In 1935 he released his debut novel Il muro di casa ("The wall of the house"), which was awarded the Viareggio Prize. After the death of his father in 1936, Pirandello reconstructed and finalised his father's unfinished drama play I giganti della montagna, which was staged the same year by Renato Simoni. In the following years Pirandello went on an intense activity as playwright, alternating dramas and comedies, in particular having critical success with the drama Un gradino più giù ("One step behind"), which dealt with a family facing the mental handicap of a child. After World War II Pirandello slowed his activities, with the failure of the Ardeatine massacre-inspired tragedy Sacrilegio massimo ("Maximum sacrilege"), staged in 1953 by Giorgio Strehler at the Piccolo Teatro in Milan, leaving him profoundly disappointed and deluded. In his later years he wrote a series of monologues for Paola Borboni, authored some radio dramas, wrote some short stories and revisited some of his early works.

He married the musician Maria Olinda Labroca in 1922. Pirandello had three children (Maria Antonietta, Andrea Luigi and Giorgio). He died on 5 February 1972, at the age of 76.
