= Giovanni Prini =

Italian sculptor

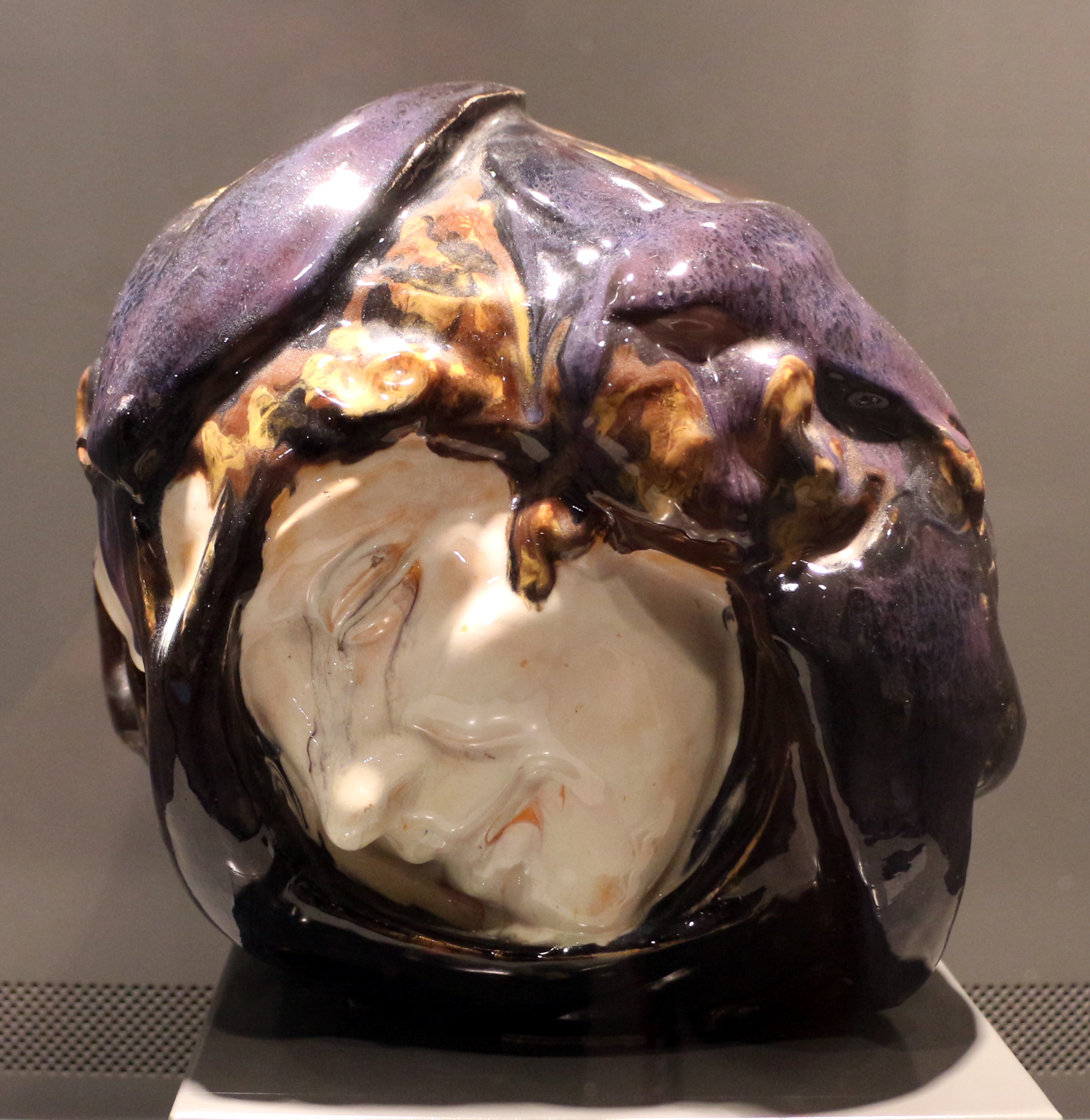
Giovanni prini, primavera (rondine), in maiolica dipinta, 1921

Giovanni Prini (1877) was an Italian sculptor.

== Early life ==
Prini trained at the Academy of Fine Arts in Genoa.

== Career ==
He made his debut in Turin, in 1898, presenting the sculptural group Le spose del Ligure.

He moved to Rome in 1900 and in 1902 he was among the artists who announced themselves in the guidelines of the magazine "Novissima".

Prini, a sensitive interpreter of the child's soul, sculpted groups of children who expressed great melancholy; images of a sad childhood that seemed burdened by a cruel fate. In this period he started the collaboration with Manifattura di Signa, for the production of ceramic sculptures, with children.

In 1905 he exhibited, in a personal room of the Society of Amateurs and Cultori of Rome, sketches for the monuments of Dante and Wagner, charcoal drawings, bronzes with figures of children and oil on paper Innamorati on a bench.

He later opened up to social themes, influenced by Giovanni Cena. He tackled work themes and illustrated covers for the weekly "Avanti della Domenica". His bronze of 1907, entitled The Blacksmith, entered the Quirinale collections.

He was a popular and recognized artist when he created, in 1911, the bas-relief The artist and the artistic battles which is in Rome, in front of the National Gallery of Modern and Contemporary Art. It evokes the grandeur of Michelangelo, with suggestions of classical Greek art. For an exhibition in Castel Sant'Angelo, Prini rebuilt in a plastic form historical parades, drawn from ancient engravings.

Prini carved commissioned monuments, friezes of public buildings, portals, sepulchral chapels, statues, fountains. He created the bronze group of the baptismal font in the church of Sant'Eugenio, in Rome, and the "Pietà" that is in the crypt of Church of the Divine Wisdom, of the University of Rome "La Sapienza". In Sanremo he carved a luminous fountain dedicated to Mussolini, later destroyed.

In 1923, he exhibited in Monza statues to decorate fountains, terracotta, colored statues and, with Vittorio Grassi, furnished the Music Room. At the Venice Biennale of 1930 he exhibited bronze statuettes in the jewellery section later n the hall of the Quadrennial of Rome, of 1948. His sculpture Ritratto di bimba is at the National Gallery of Modern Art in Rome. At the Vatican Museums (Collection of modern religious art) is preserved Anna , a bronze of 1939.

== Personal life ==
He married Orazia Belsito, poet and painter, who opened Prini's home-studio, on Via Nomentana, to a select group of friends, intellectuals and artists, including Umberto Boccioni, the writer Sibilla Aleramo, the journalist/writer Giovanni Cena, Gino Severini, Duilio Cambellotti, the sculptor Ettore Ximenes and symbolist poet Sergio Corazzini.
