= Fausto Pirandello =

Italian painter (1899–1975)

Fausto Calogero Pirandello
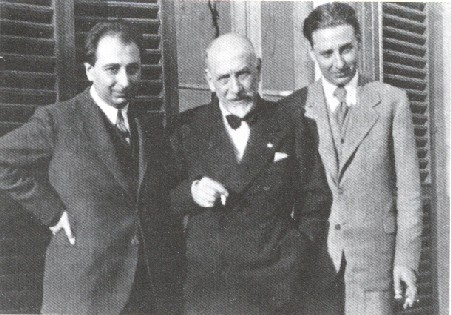
- Fausto Pirandello (right) with his father Luigi (in the center) and his brother Stefano (left) in 1931
- Born: 17 June 1899; Rome, Italy
- Died: 30 November 1975 (aged 76); Rome, Italy
- Known for: Painting
- Notable work: Composizione con nudi e pantofole gialle 1923 Donne con salamandra 1930; La Scala 1933; Il bagno 1934; La pioggia d'oro 1934; Crocifissione laica 1935 Spiaggia affollata 1939

Fausto Calogero Pirandello (17 June 1899 – 30 November 1975) was an Italian painter belonging to the modern movement of the Scuola romana (Roman School). He was the son of Nobel laureate Luigi Pirandello.

== Biography ==
After a short experience in Paris, where he met the most important artistic personalities of the time between 1920 and 1930, Pirandello entered the movement of Scuola Romana, distinguishing himself for originality and solitary exploration. His painting tends towards a quotidian realism manifested at times in the more unpleasant and pitiless aspects of life, expressed through a dense and thorny pictorial matter. His vision is an intellectualist one, which however translates even the most brutal naturalist datum into a sort of magic realism with an archaic and metaphysical taste.

Pirandello's style goes from cubism, to tonalism, to realist-expressionist forms: Important in this period was his participation to the activities of literary magazine "Corrente di Vita". Pirandello's work became an impressive testimony of a poet who interpreted in painting the analysing and psychological spirit of his father Luigi.

Pirandello changed his style around the 1950s, re-absorbing influences from the cubists (i.e., Georges Braque and Pablo Picasso), and thus living the troubled and difficult phase affecting the whole Italian painting art, between "realism" and "neocubism", yet achieving through the deformations of an expressionist approach, original formal solutions in between abstraction and figuration His paintwork sought a new definition, with a strong reference to a cubist syntax in the colour tassellations and in those compositions where the narrative datum gradually loses importance.

He exhibited widely, during the whole course of his artistic life, with displays at the various Biennales at the Roman Quadriennales, and personal expos at the Galleria della Cometa, Galleria del Secolo, Gallery of Rome. Among those after World War II, noticeable were his anthological exhibition at Ente Premi Roma in 1951, the persona of 1955 at the Catherine Viviano Gallery of New York City and the personal at "Nuova Pesa " of Rome in 1968.

== See also ==
- Scuola Romana
- Novecento Italiano
- Magic realism
- Metaphysical art

== Bibliography ==
- Fausto Pirandello 1899–1975, catalogue by G. Appella e G. Giuffrè, Macerata 1990 (with bibliography)
- C. Gian Ferrari, Fausto Pirandello, Rome 1991
- Guttuso, Pirandello, Ziveri, Realismo a Rome 1938–1943, catalogue by F. D'Amico, critical notes by F.R. Morelli, Rome 1995
- Fausto Pirandello, catalogue by G. Gian Ferrari, with essays by M. Fagiolo, F. Matitti, F. Gualdoni, M. Quesada, Milan 1995
- M. Fagiolo Dell'Arco, Scuola romana: pittura e scultura a Roma dal 1919 al 1943, Rome 1986
- M. Fagiolo Dell'Arco, Valerio Rivosecchi, Emily Braun, Scuola romana. Artisti tra le due guerre, Milan 1988
- Scuola romana, catalogue by M.Fagiolo and V.Rivosecchi, with ed. by F.R. Morelli, Milan 1988
- G. Castelfranco, D. Durbe, La Scuola romana dal 1930 al 1945, Rome 1960
- Roma sotto le stelle (Rome under the stars), catalogue by N. Vespignani, M. Fagiolo, V. Rivosecchi, ed. by I. Montesi, Rome 1994
- General Catalogue of Galleria comunale d'arte moderna e contemporanea, ed. by G. Bonasegale, Rome 1995
