= Galleria Il Milione =

The Galleria il Milione is an art gallery in Italy currently located at Via Maroncelli 7 in Milan, Italy.

== Founding and Early History ==
The art gallery was founded in November 1930 in Milan, Italy by Peppino Ghiringhelli after the space was vacated by Pier Maria Bardi when he moved to Rome. The space was near the Pinacoteca di Brera at Via Bigli 2 in Milan. For the first few months of the gallery's opening, the director was art critic Edoardo Persico. After Presico's short tenure, Peppino appointed his brother and painter Virginio (Gino) Ghiringhelli to serve as director. Their other brother Livio Ghiringhelli was brought on to help with the administration of the gallery.

This was a contemporary art gallery which exhibited young artists like Mario Sironi, Giorgio Morandi, Giorgio De Chirico, Fausto Melotti, Lucio Fontana, Osvaldo Licini, and the so-called Il gruppo degli Astrattisti ("Group of Abstractionists") including Atanasio Soldati, Manlio Rho, Mario Radice, Mauro Reggiani, Oreste Bogliardi e Gino Ghiringelli. For many of these abstract artists, they were influenced by the writing of Carlo Belli in his famed "Kn" text. Many of these artists were abstractionists or experimenting with abstraction at the time, but they also showed figurative work in the gallery (including artists associated with the Novecento group). There were a number of important shows of abstractionists, including one in 1934 that included Reggiani, Bogliardi, Ghiringhelli, Fontana, Licini, Melotti, Munari, Radice, Soldati, and Luigi Veronesi.

The gallery quickly became a hub for the larger European art scene, especially among artists interested in abstraction. Soldati, for example, met the French artist Fernand Léger at il Milione "who led him to confront Cubism and to develop a language that starts precisely from geometric shapes, with vivid and non-nuanced colors, characterized by exact limits." From the Cubism of Léger to the abstraction of Wassily Kandinsky and Josef Albers, the gallery connected artists across the content who were interested in new styles and way so thinking.

== Il Milione during the Fascist Regime ==
The Ghiringhelli brothers were well connected both at home and abroad. When Margaret Scolari Barr, wife of MoMA Director Alfred H. Barr, Jr., traveled through Milan in 1933, she stopped by their gallery and they helped her gain access to the Triennale di Architettura before it opened. She published an early exhibition review for this Triennale for The New York Times.

In 1943, the building that held the gallery was hit by the Allied bombing raids. A number of artworks, books, and documents were lost in the ensuing fires.

The Ghiringhelli's were at least passive supporters of the Fascist Regime before and during WWII. They seemed to have been enthusiastic by the end of the war. Though they were eventually cleared of any wrongdoing, they were charged with helping the Nazi occupiers identify artists and intellectuals to deport to concentration camps during the period of the Salò Republic.

== Il Milione After WWII ==
Since their main gallery was damaged in WWII, they re-opened after the war at a location on Via Manzoni before moving to Via S. Andrea and finally back to their original Via Bigli location in Brera.

In the immediate post war years, the Ghiringhelli brothers worked as part of the Milanese group Circolo delle Arte ("Circle of Art" headed gallerist Angelo Toninelli) with Alfred H. Barr, Jr. and James Thrall Soby to help the American curators source artworks for the later 1949 MoMA exhibition Twentieth Century Italian Art.

In 1949, Gino's curated an important exhibition of the work of Pablo Picasso that followed a show of Wols, which introduced a new generation to the French artist.

== Il Milione Today ==
After Gino's death, his grandson Graziano Ghiringhelli took over the gallery in 1964, until the 1990s when his children Francesca Ghiringhelli and Luca Ghiringhelli took over direction.

In the 1990s, the gallery moved from its location on the Via Bigli (in the Brera neighborhood) to the current location on Via Maroncelli (in the Porta Garibaldi neighborhood).
