= Renato Zveteremich =

Italian advertising director and publicist (1893–1951)

Renato Zveteremich (Trieste, Italy, 1893 – Milan, Italy, 1951) was an Italian advertising director and publicist. He is known for heading the Sales Development and Advertising Dept. of the Olivetti company in the 1930s.

He joined Olivetti in 1931, at a crucial moment in the expansion plan conceived by Adriano Olivetti, and was appointed art director of the Advertising Services. Under his guidance, the Milan offices acquired a revered status. An early advocate of modern design, Zveteremich adopted a 'humanistic' approach that will have a long-lasting influence on the style of Olivetti's communication. His campaigns were characterized by a modern, multidisciplinary approach. Influenced by rationalist architecture and modern art, Zveteremich hired young commercial designers with an avant-garde edge: Bruno Munari, Riccardo Ricas, Xanti Schawinsky, Erberto Carboni, Luigi Veronesi, Giovanni Pintori, Costantino Nivola, the architects Luigi Figini and Gino Pollini; and worked closely with typographer and art critic Guido Modiano. The different style and contributions of each designer conflated into a 'collective' visual culture, in opposition to the fragmented marketing approach common in advertising at the time.

He considered himself a pioneer of modern architecture, having participated in the debate on Italian rationalism alongside Persico and Pagano.

After leaving Olivetti in 1938, he worked primarily as advertising consultant for companies in the chemical and pharmaceutical sectors, such as Farmitalia, Roche, Montecatini, collaborating with designers such as Bruno Munari and Remo Muratore.

Between 1941 and 1943 he undertook an important activity as a publicist for Domus and Casabella magazine, where he expressed his views on the world of advertising, analysing its links with art and with political propaganda. His personal vision of corporate communication in which aspirations of commercial promotion and social responsibility were fused into one was way ahead of the times, and would characterize Italian advertising in the years of the economic boom in the 1950s: advertising [will have] writers and poets, painters, designers, artists, photographers, graphic designers at its service..

In 1938 Zveteremich was succeeded at Olivetti by the poet engineer Leonardo Sinisgalli. His stint at Olivetti will have a long-lasting influence on the company's graphic style durably, which extended to the post-war period. His premature death in 1951 will prevent him from being recognized as one of the most original intellectuals operating within industry – like Sinisgalli, Giovanni Villani, Arrigo Castellani.
