= Giovanni Pintori =

Italian painter and designer (1912–1999)

- Born: July 14, 1912; Tresnuraghes, Sardinia
- Died: November 15, 1999 (aged 87); Milan, Italy
- Occupation: Graphic Designer
- Years active: 1936–1999

Giovanni Pintori (14 July 1912 – 15 November 1999) was an Italian graphic designer known mostly for his advertising work with Olivetti. He is known for his use of geometric shapes and minimalist style in his advertising posters, specifically his posters for the Lettera 22 and the Olivetti logo.

== Early life and education ==
Born July 14, 1912 in Tresnuraghes, Sardinia, he was the fifth child out of six born to a dairy worker father and homemaker mother. Until 1930, Pintori lived in Sardinia and found work as a typist starting in 1927. It was during his time as a typist that he frequented a gallery owned by photographer Piero Pirari. Pirari suggested Pintori apply for a scholarship to the Higher Institute for Artistic Industries (ISIA), which he began to attend in 1930 after receiving the scholarship. Pintori won the scholarship along with Salvatore Fancello and Costantino Nivola. During his time at ISIA, Pintori studied under Elio Palazzo, director of ISIA and professor of descriptive geometry. His other influential professors included Marcello Nizzoli, Giuseppe Pagano and Edoardo Persico. While at ISIA, Pintori started to work on a project for the town-planning scheme for the Aosta Valley, and through this project he met Olivetti's Renato Zveteremich. In 1940 in collaboration with the engineer and poet Leonardo Sinisgalli he designed an exhibition for the VIIth Milan Triennial; which was awarded the Grand Prize for exhibition design.

== Work with Olivetti ==
Upon graduation in 1936 Pintori went to work for Olivetti, an Italian typewriter company founded in 1908. He worked in the advertising department before he became the art director in 1950.

In addition to designing Olivetti's advertisements and posters, Pintori was also responsible for designing the Olivetti calendars (from 1951 to 1969): every year he selected a collection of twelve paintings. The first calendar was dedicated to Henri Rousseau, and the last one focused on Nanban art. Pintori gained international acclaim after the exhibition "Olivetti: design in industry" held in the Museum of Modern Art in October–November 1952. The New York Times referred to this exhibition as "Industry's new approach to art".

Giovanni Pintori was the recipient of many awards while working at Olivetti:

- The Gold Medal for advertising by the Federazione Italiana pubblicità (1950);
- The Certificate of Excellence in the Graphic Arts by the American Institute for Graphic Arts (1955);
- The Gold Medal by the Milan Trade Fair and the First Prize Diploma by Linea Grafica (1956);
- The Grand Prize at the XIth Triennial in Milan (1957);
- The Typographic Excellence Award from the New York Directors Club (1962);
- The Certificate of Merit from the New York Art Directors Club (1964).

== Later work ==
Pintori decided to leave Olivetti in 1967, 7 years after the death of Adriano Olivetti, due to differences with the new management of the company.

In 1967, he had his solo exhibition in the Design Committee Gallery in Tokyo. After leaving Olivetti, Pintori began working as a freelance designer out of Milan, opening his own studio. He continued to do freelance work for Olivetti, but also worked with numerous other companies in the Milan area. His work included designs for magazines and books (e.g., the magazine Successo, a book cover for Bigiaretti's I racconti (Stories), and the 1980 campaign for the company Merzario S.p.A., which would be his last advertising job before his death. His clients included Ambrosetti, SIRTI, Ufficio Moderno, Gabbianelli among others.

He would work in design until his finished the Merzario campaign, when he began to paint exclusively. While his paintings have appeared in some of his design projects for advertising agencies throughout his career, he stopped using graphic design in his work, and incorporated many images of perpetual motion into his work, however many of Pintori's later paintings are little known since he kept his work rather private. Pintori had only one public showing of paintings, in 1981 in Milan.

He would remain in Milan until his death on November 15, 1999, at the age of 87.

== Style ==
Pintori's style is most commonly recognized for its use of color and geometric shapes, along with minimalistic style. Pintori developed his own vocabulary of signs: for example, a bird, flower, ship, letters and numbers. Many of his designs revolved around simplified objects rather than a direct reproduction of an object. This meant he was able to clearly represent products in his advertising with strong imagery and basic coloring.

As pointed out by M. Sironi, Giovanni Pintori "succeed in fostering the perception of lightness and transportability through images of pure suggestion – from the flight of a bird to a sailing ship composed of letters, numbers and punctuation marks – and subsequently suggesting swift ocean crossings, or the association of the typewriter with the lightness of a feather."

Pintori commented on his design approach: "I do not attempt to speak on behalf of the machines. Instead, I have tried to make them speak for themselves, through the graphic presentation of their elements, their operations and their use."

== Literature ==
- Musina, Massimiliano: Giovanni Pintori. The Stark Tension Between Flair and Discretion. Fausto Lupetti Editore, Bologna 2014 (eBook in English)
- Musina, Massimiliano: Giovanni Pintori, la severa tensione tra riserbo ed estro. Fausto Lupetti Editore, Bologna 2014 (paperback in Italian)
- Sironi, Marta. Pintori. Moleskine, S.p.A. 2015 (paperback in English)
