= Julia Peyton-Jones =

British curator and gallery director

Dame Julia Peyton-Jones DBE (born 18 February 1952) is a British curator and gallery director, currently Senior Global Director at Galerie Thaddaeus Ropac in London, Paris and Salzburg. She formerly worked as Co-Director of the Serpentine Gallery in London.

== Early life/career ==
Peyton-Jones was educated at Tudor Hall School, a boarding and day independent school for girls, between the village of Bloxham and the market town of Banbury, in Oxfordshire. She left the school in 1970.

After leaving school, Peyton-Jones studied painting at the Royal College of Art, between the years 1975–1978, but did not continue a career as a professional artist. Two of her works still hang in the Bank of England. After her education, she was briefly an art lecturer at the Edinburgh College of Art. In 1988 she became a curator at the Hayward Gallery.

== Serpentine Galleries ==
In 1991, Peyton-Jones became the director of the Serpentine Galleries. In 1998, she oversaw a major refurbishment of the gallery. In 2000 she inaugurated the annual Serpentine Gallery Pavilion, a project that invites an architect who has previously never been commissioned to work in the United Kingdom to create a temporary structure at the Gallery. The first pavilion was designed by Dame Zaha Hadid. Subsequent pavilions have been designed by Ai Weiwei, Jean Nouvel, and Oscar Niemeyer.

In 2013, she oversaw the expansion of the Serpentine into a second building, the Serpentine Sackler Gallery. The Serpentine Sackler Gallery is located in a Grade II listed building, which was originally used for gunpowder storage, and has an extension by the architect Zaha Hadid. Following the scandal involving the Sackler family in the opioid epidemic in the USA, Serpentine renamed the gallery Serpentine North Gallery. In October 2015, Peyton-Jones announced her departure from her role at the Serpentine Galleries in summer 2016.

== New Projects ==
Peyton-Jones announced she was stepping down from her post in the Serpentine in October 2015, planning to work independently in contemporary art and architecture, and embark on new projects. “I felt after 25 years this was a good time to hand over the reins to someone new” she said.

In 2017, she co-curated a show with Sharon Hecker on Italian sculptor Medardo Rosso at the Galerie Thaddaeus Ropac called Medardo Rosso: Sight Unseen and His Encounters with London. During this time, Peyton-Jones was already the Senior Global Director of Galerie Thaddaeus Ropac.

At age 64, in January 2017, the birth of Peyton-Jones's first child, a daughter, Pia was announced. Peyton-Jones declined to discuss the circumstances of the child's conception or gestation.

== Recognition ==
Peyton-Jones was appointed Officer of the Order of the British Empire (OBE) in the 2003 Birthday Honours for services to art and elevated to Dame Commander of the Order of the British Empire (DBE) in the 2016 Birthday Honours for services to the arts.
