= Gruppo del Cenobio =

Italian painter

Gruppo del Cenobio (Cenobio Group) was a collective formed in Milan in 1962 by five young artists - Agostino Ferrari, Ugo La Pietra, Ettore Sordini, Angelo Verga and Arturo Vermi - and the poet Alberto Lùcia.

They took their name from the Galleria Il Cenobio, Milan, where they held a series of exhibitions in 1962. These were followed by exhibitions at La Saletta del Premio del Fiorino in Florence, L’Indice in Milan, and Galleria Cavallino in Venice.

They were brought together by a rejection of the nihilistic and hypercritical reactions to painting and the invasion of the American culture with Pop Art.

A major retrospective exhibition titled "Nel segno del segno" was held at Palazzo Stelline, Milan, in March 2013 to mark the fiftieth anniversary of the group's first exhibition.

== Bibliography ==
- Alberto Lùcia, Il Cenobio alla Saletta del Fiorino, exhibition catalogue, Florence 1963
- Maurizio Vitta, Milano e Mitologia: I poli della ricerca visiva 1958-1964, Bellora, Milan 1989
- Carlo Pirovano, La Pittura in Italia. Il Novecento/2 1945-1990, Milan, Electa, 1993
- Vincenzo Accame and Angela Vettese, Il gruppo del Cenobio, in Arte Italiana. Segno e scrittura, ed. Banca Commerciale Italiana, Milan, 1996
- Luciano Caramel, Nel Segno del segno - dopo l'Informale - Il gruppo del cenobio, Fondazione Gruppo Credito Valtellinese, 2013
