= Victoria Barr =

Victoria Barr may refer to:

- Vicki Barr (athlete) (born 1982), British sprinter
- Victoria Barr (painter) (born 1937), American artist, painter, and set designer
- Victoria Barr (feral child) (born 1988), American feral child from Austin/Texas
