= Sharon Hecker =

American-Italian art historian

Sharon Hecker (born 1966) is an American-Italian art historian, critic, curator, and art consultant.

== Education ==
In 1988, Hecker received her BA in Renaissance Studies and then a Masters of Arts in the History of Art (1994) at Yale University. Later in 1999, she completed her Ph.D. in the History of Art at University of California at Berkeley.

== Career ==
Hecker started out in the early 1990s at the Peggy Guggenheim Collection in Venice and the US Pavilion for the Venice Biennale. Over the course of that decade, she held positions at the Gallery Christian Stein in Milan and University of California, Berkeley (as a lecturer). In 2006, she began working for the IES Abroad program with the Università Cattolica del Sacro Cuore in Milan, Italy. Then, in 2018 she began teaching in the Masters program at Università Cattolica del Sacro Cuore in Arts Management, at the Università degli Studi di Milano, and at the Harvard University, Summer Institute for Technical Studies in Art (SITSA).

Hecker is the series editor for the Visual Cultures and Italian Contexts series for Bloomsbury Visual Arts.

Hecker runs workshops and offers private consulting on evidence-based art historical research for which she has copyrighted The Hecker Standard. Some of the organizations she has worked with are: the ADR Camera Arbitrale di Milano, Associazione Italiana Family Office (AIFO) Università Cattolica Master's in Arts Management, 24Ore Business School Master Economia e Management dell’Arte e dei Beni Culturali, the Master's in Art Law at the University of Milan, the University of Pavia Master's in Gestione Innovativa dell’arte and the Luiss Guido Carli Art Law Master's Program and at the SDA Università Bocconi Master's Concentration in Art Markets and Finance. She was interviewed about her method for Art Law in 2021, by ArteConcas in 2020, and spoke about this method at the Catalogue Raisonné Scholars Association in 2018 as part of a two-day conference titled The Afterlife of Sculptures: Posthumous Casts in Scholarship, the Market, and the Law.

== Academic research ==
Much of Hecker's academic research has been on the Italian sculptor Medardo Rosso. She began publishing on her research on Rosso in the 1990s.

Hecker published her 2017 book on Rosso. From the University of California Press, A Moment’s Monument. Medardo Rosso and the International Origins of Modern Sculpture was translated into Italian for an edition from Johan & Levi Editore. This book had a number of positive reviews: Caroline Levitt in CAA Reviews, Rosalind McKever in The Burlington Magazine, and Jennifer Griffiths in Italian Art Society Newsletter.

Her scholarly work also looks to later in the twentieth century to artists Lucio Fontana, Luciano Fabro, Francesco Lo Savio, Giuseppe Penone, and Marisa Merz. This also includes translating Italian primary sources into English.

Hecker has also published on The Hecker Standard and related topics, including a chapter in the book Conversazioni in arte e diritto (Giappichelli 2021), a chapter in the volue Le opere d'arte e le collezioni Acquisto, gestione, trasferimento (in Italian, 2020), in the magazine WeWealth (in Italian), and in the Art & Cultural Haritage Law Newsletter published by the Art & Cultural Heritage Law Committee (Summer 2021). Her most recent addition to this related research is her co-edited volume Posthumous Art, Law and the Art Market: The Afterlife of Art (Routledge, 2022).

== Curatorial projects ==
Hecker's first curatorial project was the show Medardo Rosso: Second Impressions in 2003-2004 that went to Harvard University Art Museums, Cambridge MA; Nasher Sculpture Center, Dallas; Saint Louis Art Museum, St. Louis. The show was curated by Hecker in conjunction with the Fogg Art Museum Curator of Modern Art, Harry Cooper. The show was reviewed in the New York Times by Holland Cotter.

In 2014, Hecker curated Medardo Rosso. Bambino ebreo for Peter Freeman, Inc. in New York. Before the show opened the gallery held a two-day "technical examination" of Rosso's work, which highlighted the procedures she uses in The Hecker Standard.

In 2016, she curated another show of Rosso's work with Tamara S. Schenkenberg for the Pulitzer Arts Foundation, St. Louis, MO. This show titled Medardo Rosso: Experiments in Light and Form was named one of the "Best Art of 2017" by The Wall Street Journal, where author Karen Wilkin writes "Overshadowed in his day by his admirer Rodin, Rosso is still little known. Let's hope this fine retrospective corrects that." As part of the publicity for this show, co-curators Hecker and Schenkenberg were guests on The Modern Art Notes Podcast. The exhibition was widely reviewed and universally praised: by Lilly Wei in Sculpture Magazine, Susan Waller in Nineteenth Century Art Worldwide, Eric Gibson in The Wall Street Journal, Martina Droth in The Burlington Magazine, Devon Van Houten Maldonado in Hyperallergic, Karen Wilkin in The New Criterion and Rosalind McKever in The Burlington Magazine.

In 2017, Hecker co-curated another show on Rosso with Julia Peyton-Jones at the Galerie Thaddaeus Ropac called Medardo Rosso: Sight Unseen and His Encounters with London. A video preview of the show can still be seen on YouTube. This exhibition was widely reviewed: Devon Van Houten Maldonado in HYPERALLERGIC, Ara Merjian in Art in America, Louisa Buck in The Telegraph, Rachel Spence in The Financial Times, Rosalind McKever in Apollo Magazine, Margaret Carrigan in The Observer, and Rosalind McKever The Burlington Magazine.

Hecker curated a show on Fontana for the Peggy Gugghenheim Museum, which opened in October 2025. Around the opening date, Hecker gave an interview with Petra Schaefer for Art Frame.

== Selected publications ==
=== Monographs ===
- 2017 A Moment’s Monument. Medardo Rosso and the International Origins of Modern Sculpture (University of California Press) [Italian Edition from Johan & Levi Editore 2017 ]

=== Edited volumes ===
- 2019 Postwar Italian Art History Today Untying 'the Knot' Editors Sharon Hecker, Marin R. Sullivan (Bloomsbury)
- 2021 Finding Lost Wax: The Disappearance and Recovery of an Ancient Casting Technique and the Experiments of Medardo Rosso, Editor Sharon Hecker (Brill)
- 2021 Lead in Modern and Contemporary Art Editors: Sharon Hecker, Silvia Bottinelli (Bloomsbury)
- 2022 Posthumous Art, Law and the Art Market The Afterlife of Art Edited By Sharon Hecker, Peter J. Karol (Routledge)
- 2022 Curating Fascism: Exhibitions and Memory from the Fall of Mussolini to Today Editors Sharon Hecker, Raffaele Bedarida (Bloomsbury)
- 2023 Female Cultural Production in Modern Italy Literature, Art and Intellectual History Editors Sharon Hecker, Catherine Ramsey-Portolano (Palgrave Macmillan)
- 2024 Apollo and Daphne: Luciano Fabro and the Feminine Sharon Hecker (Artusa Press)
- 2025 Disguising Disease in Italian Political and Visual Culture From Post-Unification to COVID-19 Edited By Sharon Hecker, Arianna Arisi Rota (Routledge)
- 2025 Art and Intimacy in Modern Italy Entangled Lives Edited by Sharon Hecker and Teresa Kittler (Bloomsbury)

=== Articles/essays ===
- 1996 "Medardo Rosso's first commission," The Burlington Magazine, vol 138:1125 (December 1996) 817–822
- 1998 “L’esordio milanese di Medardo Rosso.” Bolletino dell’Accademia degli Euteleti, December 1998, vol. 65, pp. 185–201.
- 2000 “Medardo Rosso: a Milano sognando Parigi,” in Milano. Venticinque secoli di storia attraverso i suoi personaggi (Milan: Celip, 2000).
- 2000 “Ambivalent Bodies: Medardo Rosso’s Brera Petition.” The Burlington Magazine vol. 142:1173 (December 2000): 773–777.
- 2002 “Medardo Rosso: Ecce Puer, 1906,” in Leggere l’arte, S. Fugazza, ed., (Piacenza, Galleria Ricci-Oddi, 2002): 79–88.
- 2003 “Medardo Rosso,” in Winds of Change: The Milanese Avant-Garde 1860-1900, exhibition catalogue, ed. F. Licht (Naples, FL: The Gilgore Collection, 2003): 84–103.
- 2008 “Fleeting Revelations: The Demise of Duration in Medardo Rosso’s Wax Sculpture,” in Ephemeral Bodies: Wax Sculpture and the Human Figure, R. Panzanelli, ed., Getty Research Institute Issues and Debates Book Series (Los Angeles: J.P. Getty Trust, 2008): 131–153.
- 2010 “Shattering the Mould: Medardo Rosso and the Poetics of Plaster,” in Plaster Casts: Making, Collecting and Displaying from Classical Antiquity to the Present, R. Frederiksen and E. Marchand, eds. (Berlin: Walter de Gruyter, 2010): 319–330.
- 2011 "Art is Glimpsed: Luciano Fabro's "Penelope" (1972)" in Contemporary Art, Classical Myth (Routledge), 2011
- 2012 “Servant of Two Masters: Lucio Fontana’s 1948 Sculptures in Milan’s Cinema Arlecchino.” Oxford Art Journal vol. 35:3 (December 2012): 337–361
- 2013 “Sealed Between Us. The Role of Wax in Luciano Fabro’s Tuˆ.” Oxford Art Journal vol. 36:1 (March 2013): 13–38.
- 2013 “If the Boot Fits…Luciano Fabro’s Italie.” In G. Gazzola, guest ed., Italy from Without. Forum Italicum vol. 47: 2 (August 2013): 431–462
- 2017 "The afterlife of sculptures: posthumous casts and the case of Medardo Rosso (1858–1928)." Journal of Art Historiography (2017)
- 2018 "Born on a train: the impact of Medardo Rosso's internationalism on his legacy." Sculpture Journal (2018)
- 2019 "Chapter 8 The Modern Italian Sculptor as International Entrepreneur: The Case of Medardo Rosso (1858–1928)" in Art Crossing Borders: The Internationalisation of the Art Market in the Age of Nation States, 1750-1914 Editors: Jan Dirk Baetens and Dries Lyna. (Brill) 256–299
- 2020 “An Italian Sculptor-Emigré in Paris: The Case of Medardo Rosso” in Sculpting Abroad Nationality and Mobility of Sculptors in the Nineteenth Century in M. Sterckx, T. Verschaffel (eds.) (Turnhout, Belgium: Brepols, 2020).
- 2021 "Remo Bianco, plastic and the trauma of the post-war Italian artist" Sculpture Journal, Volume 33, Number 4, 2021
- 2021 “When the eye tired of observing rests”: Diffuse Attention in the Art and Writing of Medardo Rosso”, Odradek (Studies in Philosophy of Literature, Aesthetics and new Media Theories), University of Pisa, Vol 7 No 2 (2021): “Patterns of Attention”, ed. Alberto Frigo.
- 2024 “Collecting modern Italian sculpture in Britain: Charles Meek and Medardo Rosso:” The Burlington Magazine, November 2024, Vol. 166, No. 1460.
