= Luigi Veronesi =

Italian painter

- Born: 28 May 1908; Milan, Italy
- Died: 25 February 1998 (aged 89); Milan, Italy
- Occupations: Photographer painter film director

Luigi Veronesi (28 May 1908 – 25 February 1998) was an Italian photographer, painter, scenographer and film director born in Milan.

== Early career ==
Luigi Veronesi trained as textile designer in the 1920s and by practised photography. He was introduced by Raffaelle Giolli to a group of Italian intellectuals associated with the review Poligono. At the age of 20, he became interested in painting and took lessons with the Neapolitan painter Carmelo Violante, then professor at the Accademia Carrara of Bergamo (Italy). In 1932 he travelled to Paris and met Fernand Léger.

== Abstraction ==
Veronesi's first works presented in the Gallery Il Milione in Milan were still figurative, though he moved later in the direction of abstract art. Influenced by Constructivist theories (and politically aligned with Communism), Veronesi used the cyanotype photogram after 1932 as a means of revealing metaphysical qualities in objects. In 1934, he exhibited xylographic works with the German artist Josef Albers in the Gallery Il Milione. In the same year he joined the photographic group Abstraction-Création in Paris, experimented in constructivism, and adhered to the Bauhaus method. On 4 March 1935, he participated to the first collective exhibition of abstract art of Italy in the atelier of the painters Felice Casorati and Enrico Paolucci in Turin together with the artists Oreste Bogliardi, Cristoforo De Amicis, Ezio D'Errico, Lucio Fontana, Virginio Ghiringhelli, Osvaldo Licini, Fausto Melotti, Mauro Reggiani and Atanasio Soldati, who signed the Manifest of the first collective exhibition of Italian abstract art.

In 1936, Veronesi was the illustrator of a geometry book of Leonardo Sinisgalli and he participated to the triennal of Milan. In that year he also participated to an exhibition of abstract art in the city of Como (Italy) with the artists Lucio Fontana, Virginio Ghiringhelli, Osvaldo Licini, Alberto Magnelli, Fausto Melotti, Enrico Prampolini, Mario Radice, Mauro Reggiani, Manlio Rho and Atanasio Soldati.

Experimenting with the photogram Veronesi combined the photographic image with oil on canvas in large-scale colour images by preparing a light-sensitive canvas on which he placed objects in the dark for exposure and then fixing. The shapes became the matrix for an abstract painting to which he applied colour and added drawn geometric lines to enhance the dynamics, exhibiting them in a solo show at the Galerie L’Équipe in Paris in 1938–1939.

Veronesi's interest in music continued, creating a polydimensionality in his art intended as an overall theme, and his research into the mathematical relationships of musical notes intensified as he translated musical notes into tonal relationships of colour. He thus created numerous chromatic transpositions of musical scores. In the late 1990s, the musician Sergio Maltagliati expanded on Veronesi's research.

After World War II, he was the co-founder of the photographic group La Bussola. He participated to the exhibition Arte astratta arte concreta in the Royal Palace of Milan (Palazzo Reale) in 1947 and adhered to the Movimento Arte Concreta (M.A.C.) in Milan in 1949. He worked several years as graphic designer.

== Theatre and cinema ==
Veronesi was also active in theatre and cinema with nine experimental and abstract films made between 1938 and 1980, seven of which were destroyed during bombing in World War II. He participated to the national exhibition of scenography in Rome in 1938. In 1942, he made the scenography of the opera Minnie la candida of Riccardo Malipiero. From the 1940s, he worked as scenographer with Giorgio Strehler, the founder of the Piccolo Teatro of Milan, in particular in works of Luigi Pirandello, and later built several sets for the Scala Theater of Milan until the end of the 1980s.

== Teaching ==
From 1963 to 1979, Veronesi taught graphic arts at the graduate course of industrial design in Venice and later was professor of colour science at the Brera Academy (Milan).

== Late career ==
In the 1980s, he participated in the exhibition on Italian abstract art in the framework of the 33rd Biennale di Venezia; he staged a personal exhibition in Bolzano in 1980 and another in Pordenone (Italy) in 1984; and he was the coauthor, with Giancarlo Pauletto, of a book on the Italian artist Genesio De Gottardo published in 1989.

Luigi Veronesi was a polyvalent and eclectic artist who managed to synthesise the avant-garde movements of various regions of Europe. He died in Milan in 1998.

== Retrospective exhibitions ==
- Royal Palace of Milan (Palazzo Reale di Milano)
- Institut Matildenhöhe, Darmstadt
- Sprengel Museum, Hannover
- Stiftung für konstruktive und konkrete Kunst, Zurich
