= Ettore Sordini =

Italian painter (1934–2012)

Ettore Sordini (Milan, Kingdom of Italy, 24 August 1934 - Fossombrone, Italian Republic, 27 October 2012) was an Italian artist, a disciple of Lucio Fontana, a friend and collaborator of Piero Manzoni and a member of the Gruppo del Cenobio.

== Biography ==
=== Early years ===
He studied at the Brera Academy where his first experiences were abstract. His first major exhibition was at the Triennale di Milano in 1954. During the second half of the 1950s he came to know Lucio Fontana, Corrado Cagli and Giulio Turcato. During this period he developed a parasurreal style reminiscent of his contemporary Piero Manzoni.

=== Manifestos ===
In 1956, together with Piero Manzoni, Giuseppe Zecca and Camillo Corvi-Mora, he published a manifesto entitled Per la scoperta di una zona di immagini (Looking for a zone of images) where they declared: "the picture is our idea of freedom; in its space we set out on a journey of discovery and creation of images". Between 1956 and 1957 he was involved in the publication of further manifestos:

- L’arte non è vera creazione (Art is not true creation) (May 1957) with Manzoni, Verga, Biasi and Colucci, where they declared it was necessary to get rid of the cultural and emotional background that pollutes present-day art. This was published for the three-man exhibition of works by Sordini, Manzoni and Verga at the Galleria Pater in Milan, along with a presentation by Lucio Fontana;
- Oggi il concetto di quadro... (The concept of the picture today...) (with Manzoni and Verga);
- Per una pittura organica (Towards organic painting) (June 1957) (with Manzoni, Verga, Biasi and Colucci) in which they declare their support for the Nuclear Art movement;
- Il manifesto di Albissola Marina (with the same artists);
- Contro lo stile (Against style), which declared their rejection of Abstract Art as well as Arte Informale (signed by twenty-four international artists);
- Il manifesto d'Arte Interplanetaria (with Verga and Enrico Baj, Lucio Del Pezzo, Bruno di Bello and others);
- Il manifesto di Napoli (signed also by Edoardo Sanguineti).

In October 1957, Sordini took part in a group exhibition called "Arte Nuclear 1957" at Galleria San Fedele, Milan, with Piero Manzoni, Angelo Verga, Enrico Baj, Yves Klein, Franco Bemporad, Asger Jorn, Arnaldo and Giò Pomodoro, Mario Rossello and Serge Vandercam.

By 1959 Sordini and Verga began to move away from Manzoni, and Sordini developed his interest in graphic expression.

=== Gruppo del Cenobio ===
In 1962, Sordini and Verga joined Agostino Ferrari, Arturo Vermi and Ugo La Pietra, as well as the poet Alberto Lùcia to form the Gruppo del Cenobio in an attempt to combat the nihilistic and hypercritical trends in painting as well as the invasion of the American art culture with the success of Pop Art and, in the following years, produced a series of personal and group exhibitions at the Galleria il Cenobio in Milan as well as at the Saletta del Premio del Fiorino in Florence, the Galleria L’Indice in Milan and the Galleria Cavallino in Venice.

A major retrospective exhibition titled "Nel segno del segno" was held at Palazzo Stellina, Milan, in March 2013 to mark the fiftieth anniversary of the group's first exhibition.

=== Later years ===
After the Venice Biennale in 1966, Sordini established himself in Rome. As well as personal exhibitions in Rome at the Galleria l'Oca, Galleria Romera and Galleria La Salita, and throughout Italy, he took part in major national exhibitions including Linee della ricerca artistica italiana at the Palazzo delle Esposizioni in 1981 and the Quadriennale di Roma in 1986.

== Bibliography ==
- A. Lùcia, Ettore Sordini, catalogue of personal exhibition, Galleria Cenobio, Milan 6–9 March 1963.
- A. Lùcia, Il Cenobio alla Saletta del Fiorino, exhibition catalogue, Florence 1963
- E. Villa, Ettore Sordini: L’Epigrafia Maggiore, 1974
- E. Sordini, Il compagno di strada, catalogue for exhibition of drawings by Piero Manzoni, Rome, 1986
- F. Abbate, Ettore Sordini, exhibition catalogue Galleria San Carlo, Milan, 12 May 1988
- M. Vitta, Milano et Mitologia: I poli della ricerca visiva 1958-1964, Bellora, Milan 1989
- La Pittura in Italia. Il Novecento/2 1945-1990, edited by Carlo Pirovano, Milan, Electa, 1993
- V. Accame and A. Vettese, Il gruppo del Cenobio, in Arte Italiana. Segno e scrittura, ed. Banca Commerciale Italiana, Milan, 1996
- L. Caramel, Nel Segno del segno - dopo l'Informale - Il gruppo del cenobio, Fondazione Gruppo Credito Valtellinese, 2013
