= Manifesto Blanco =

The Manifiesto Blanco, or White Manifesto, was written in 1946 by artists and students in Buenos Aires, Argentina, under the direction of Lucio Fontana.

The manifesto emphasized the importance of new technologies as they pertained to the arts and the pursuit of integrating art and science.

"This idea of synthesis is grounded in the concept that certain scientific and philosophical developments have transformed the human psyche to such an extent that traditional 'static' art forms and the differentiation of artistic disciplines have become obsolete. A new, synthetic art is advocated that will involve the dynamic principle of movement through time and space."
