= Margaret Scolari Barr =

American art historian

Barr in Venice in 1948

Margaret Scolari Barr (1901–1987) was an art historian, art critic, educator, translator, and curator.

== Life ==
Margaret Scolari Barr was born in 1901 in Rome to the Italian antiquities dealer, Virgilio Scolari and his Irish wife Mary Fitzmaurice Scolari. She attended the University of Rome from 1919 to 1922 before moving to the United States in 1925. She taught Italian at Vassar College until 1929, where she also started her MA in art history in 1927. During this time, she started working at the American embassy in the office of the naval attache (from 1922-24). At Vassar College, she was introduced to the young art historian Alfred H. Barr, Jr. by her colleague Henry-Russell Hitchcock. At this time, she was offered a position at the Smith College Art Museum, but turned it down to move closer to Barr. In 1929, she moved to NYC where she started taking classes at New York University in art history. She married the art historian and curator Alfred Barr on 8 May 1930 in Paris. She and Barr had one daughter, Victoria Barr who was a painter. Scolari Barr died of colon cancer in New York in 1987.

== Work ==
Scolari Barr taught Italian at Vassar College (1925–29). After moving to New York, she taught art history at the Spence School (1943–73), where she became friends of other art historians like Erwin Panofsky and Bernard Berenson. Throughout her marriage with Barr, she collaborated with him on a number of projects with everything from translations and research, to writing and editing. She was fluent in French, Italian, Spanish and German. She was integral to a number of Barr's projects at his workplace, MoMA, including the 1936–37, exhibition Fantastic Art, Dada, Surrealism. She translated the essay in the exhibition's catalogue by George Hugnet.

In 1933, she published a review of the most recent Triennale di Milano in The New York Times. This Triennale was the first to be held it its new building, funded by the Italian Fascist regime. Scolari Barr was allowed into the Triennale early, before its public opening, because of her connections to the Ghiringhelli brothers, the owners of the important Milanese Galleria del Milione. When war came to Europe, Scolari Barr and her husband worked within the Museum of Modern Art to help bring artists being persecuted by the National Socialist regime to safety in the US. Their friend, the collector and curator Peggy Guggenheim, also helped bring her soon-to-be-husband Max Ernst to the USA. Guggenheim, Ernst, and the Barrs were close friends in New York.

She continued teaching at the Spence School and researching and writing throughout her life. Scolari Barr was brought on by McGraw-Hill Publishing Company as a translation editor in 1957 (till 1959). She published the first English-language monograph on the Italian modernist sculptor Medardo Rosso in 1963, which was published to coincide with a retrospective of Rosso's work at MoMA. She was very involved in educational avenues, which have supported other women with guided research. The same year as the monograph, she published an article on Rosso and his Dutch collector Etha Fles. In the 1960s, Scolari Barr also lectured on topics of contemporary art at Milton Academy, where her daughter had attended as a child. In 1974, she gave an oral history interview for the Archives of American Art detailing her and her husband's work. In 1978, she added the Forward to an interview between Barr and Jere Abbott for October. Her most comprehensive recounting of her and Barr's work in the inter-war and post-war period came in an article for The New Criterion in 1987. In 2010, her contribution to MoMA was highlighted in the exhibition and its accompanying catalogue Modern Women: Women Artists at the Museum of Modern Art. In 2015, her work at MoMA was made public in their archives.
