= Spatialism =

Art movement

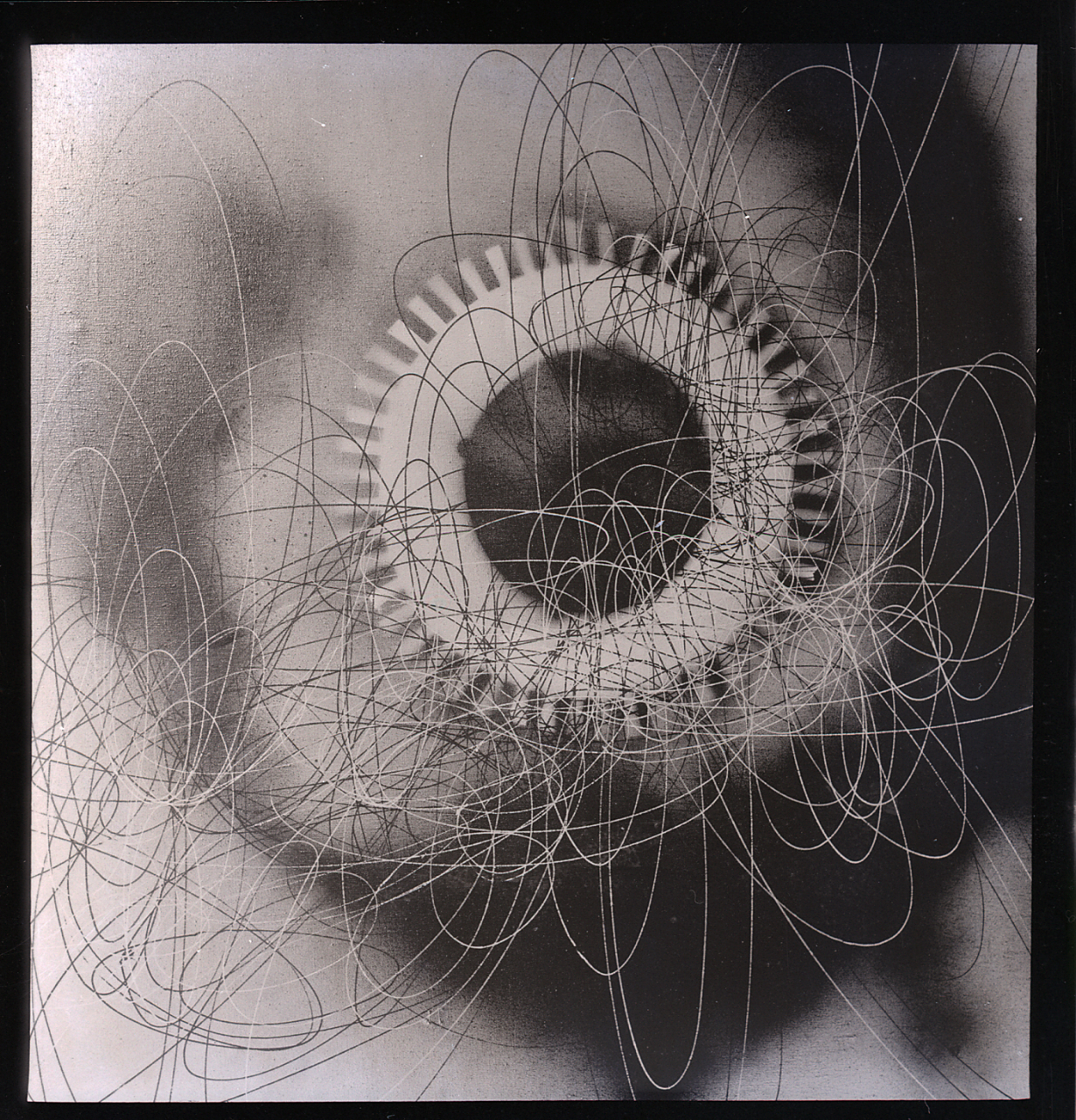
Roberto Crippa, Spiralis. Photo by Paolo Monti, 1953 (Fondo Paolo Monti, BEIC).

Spatialism (Italian: Spazialismo) is an art movement founded by Argentine-Italian artist Lucio Fontana in Milan in 1947 in which he proposed to synthesize colour, sound, space, movement, and time into a new type of art.

== Overview ==
The main ideas of the movement were anticipated in his Manifiesto blanco (White Manifesto) published in Buenos Aires in 1946. In it he spoke of a new "spatial" art in keeping with the spirit of the post-war age. It repudiated the illusory or "virtual" space of traditional easel painting and sought to unite art and science to project colour and form into real space by the use of up-to-date techniques such as neon lighting and television. Five more manifestos followed; they were more specific in their negative than their positive aspects, and carried the concept of Spatialism little further than the statement that its essence consisted in "plastic emotions and emotions of colour projected upon space". In 1947 Fontana created a "Black Spatial Environment", a room painted black, which was considered to have foreshadowed Environment art. His stabbed and slashed canvases (beginning in 1949 and 1959 respectively) are also considered to embody Spatialism. An example of the slashed type (the slash made with a razor blade) is Spatial Concept Waiting (1960, Tate, London). Although Fontana's ideas were vague, his outlook was influential, for he was one of the first, certainly the first Latin American and European artist to truly promote the idea of art as gesture or performance, rather than as the creation of an enduring physical work.

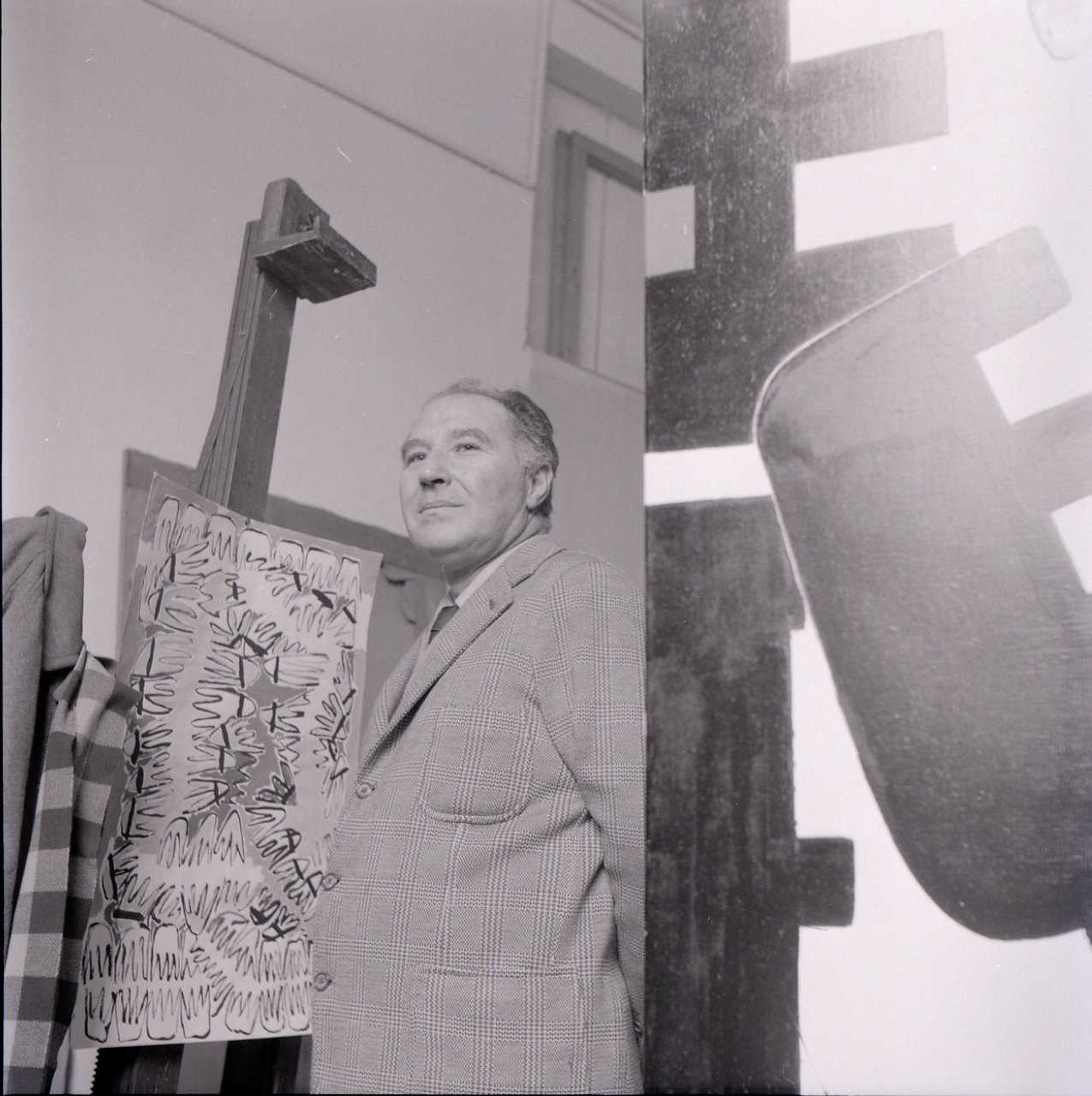
Giuseppe Capogrossi. Photo by Paolo Monti, 1972.

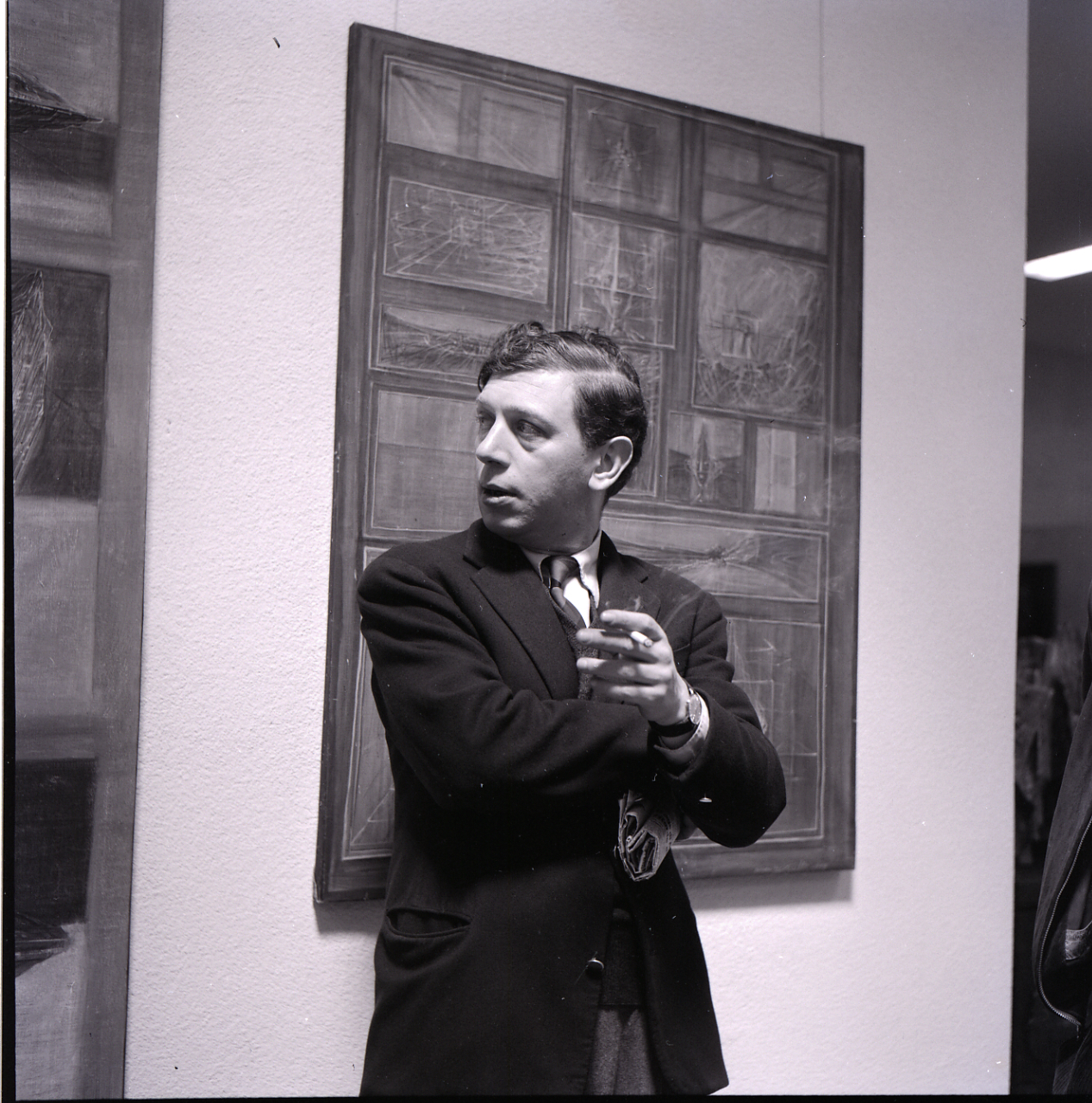
Cesare Peverelli. Photo by Paolo Monti.

== Cyber-Spatialism ==
In 2005, the Franco-German artist couple Cécile Colle and Ralf Nuhn produced a series of canvases with computer connectors inserted into them, entitled "Cyber-Spatialism." The project was heavily influenced by Fontana's work. According to the artists, "by substituting Fontana's slashes with computer connectors, Cyber-Spatialism implies an extension of the canvas into cyberspace, and thus attempts to address the notion, that in today's (globalized) culture, real space is increasingly being replaced by virtual space."
