= Victoria Barr (painter) =

American painter (1937–2025)

Victoria Barr (September 25, 1937 – March 28, 2025) was an American artist, painter and set designer.

== Life and career ==
Victoria Barr was born in New York City on September 25, 1937, to art historian Margaret Scolari Barr, and Alfred H. Barr Jr., inaugural director of the Museum of Modern Art. As a child, she spent summers in Greensboro, Vermont, with her parents, and attended residential camps focusing on the arts. Barr often traveled to Europe with her parents from the age of 14 onwards, meeting influential artists like Pablo Picasso, Henri Matisse, and Marc Chagall and collectors such as Peggy Guggenheim. Barr attended Milton Academy in Milton, Massachusetts, before briefly attending Radcliffe College (1955–1956). Barr then studied at the Parsons School of Design, focusing on graphics and advertising. There Barr took classes in art history from Leo Steinberg and in color theory from Sewell Sillman, who was Josef Albers' studio assistant at Yale. Afterward meeting Sillman, Barr decided to attend the Yale Art School, graduating in 1961. Barr began studying commercial design in graphics then began taking painting classes with Neil Welliver, then with Albers, another one of his assistants Cy Twombly, as well as Bernard Chaet and William Bailey. She received her BFA from Yale in 1961. Barr lived and worked in Aspen for some time in the early 1960s. Back in New York, she worked for a time as a secretary to the art dealer Steven Spector

Barr traveled to Paris, France on a Fulbright scholarship, along with fellow artist and Fulbright scholars Nancy Graces, who would later marry Richard Serra who joined their group in Paris, and Philip Glass. After two years in Paris, Barr returned to the US in 1966 and began working at the Museum of Natural History in the exhibition's department for a year. Barr later taught courses at Hunter College and at Barnard.

Her obituary notes that "she joined the women's movement, leading meetings of consciousness raising which focused on the problems women faced within the art world, and participated in anti-Vietnam War activism."

Barr lived in New York City, for the rest of her life. She died in Manhattan on March 28, 2025, at the age of 87.

== Artwork ==
Barr is best known for her abstract landscapes, which come out of a tradition of post-war American Abstract Expressionism, Lyrical Abstraction, and Color Field painting. She referred to her early work as "stained paintings." She also connected her work to an interest in landscape to Chinese landscape painting in terms of different layers of gradation. Her work often deals with her interest in understanding the world, outside of the European Christianity. Her extensive travels throughout Europe, South and East Asia, South America, and the Pacific were part of this research project.

In 1970, Barr's work was shown at the John B Meyer's Gallery with work in acrylic and watercolor and a series of "stained paintings" at Larry Aldrich. In 1981, she had a show at the Haber Theodore gallery in New York. She has works in a number of important collections, including Surfacing (1971) in the Whitney Museum collection and the University of North Dakota's collection.
