= Luciano Caramel =

Italian art critic, curator and historian (1935–2022)

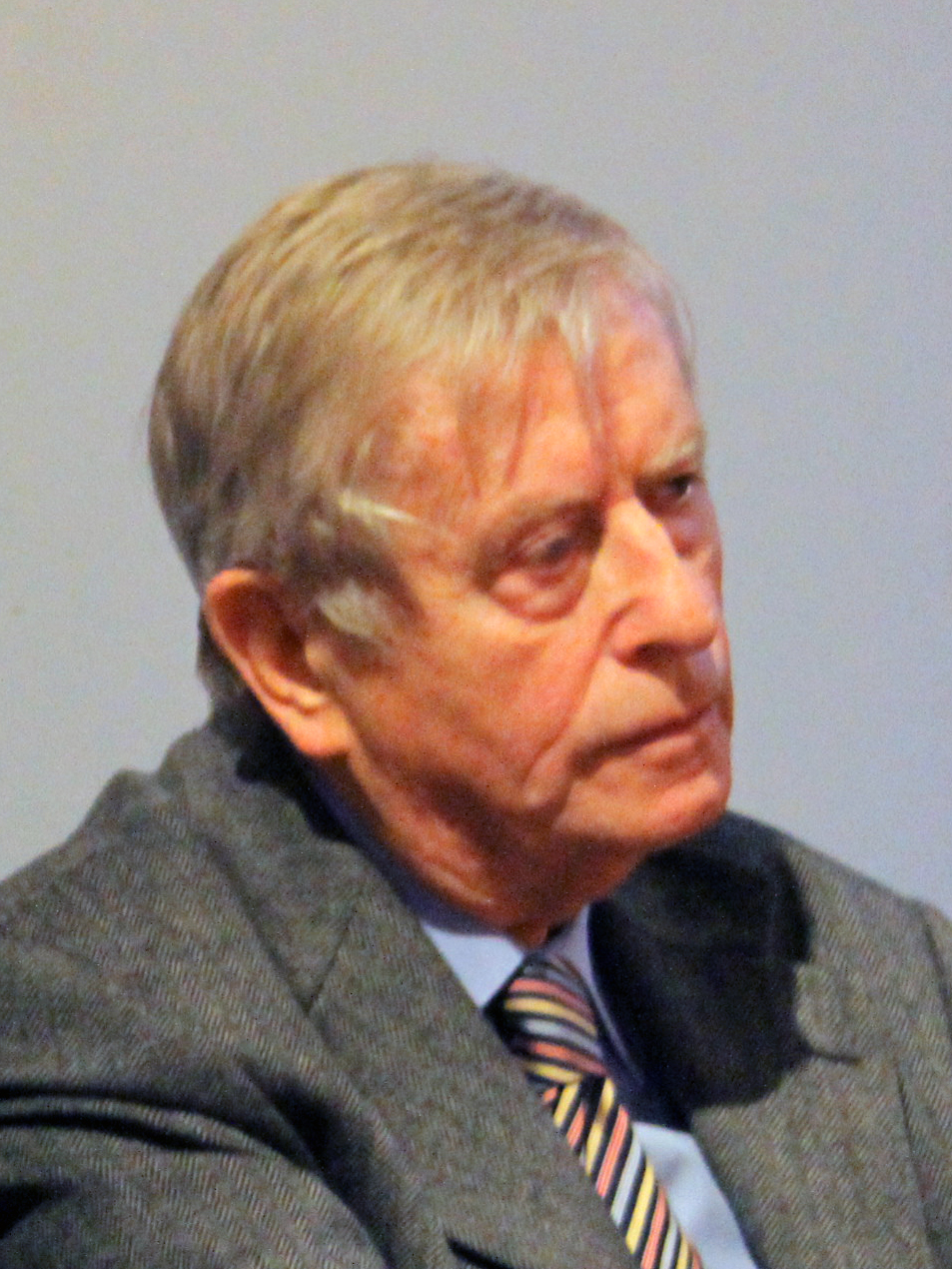
- Caramel in 2013
- Born: 13 December 1935; Como, Italy
- Died: November 2022 (aged 86)
- Occupations: Art critic, art historian

Luciano Caramel (13 December 1935 – November 2022) was an Italian art critic, curator, and art historian. In the 1980s he was Deputy Director of the Accademia di Belle Arti di Brera in Milan. He taught contemporary art at the Università Cattolica del Sacro Cuore in Milan and at Accademia Albertina in Turin. He was an expert on the work of Medardo Rosso. His publications include Arte in Italia 1945-1960, a university textbook.

In 2002, he co-curated with Carlo Chenis the 10th edition of The Sacred Art Biennial in Teramo.

A festschrift dedicated to him, Il presente si fa storia, scritti in onore di Luciano Caramel, was published in 2008.

Caramel died in November 2022, at the age of 86.
