= Edoardo Persico =

Italian art critic and designer (1900–1936)

Edoardo Persico (Naples, 8 February 1900 – Milan, 10 January 1936) was an Italian architecture and art critic, designer and essayist.

== Early years ==
Persico was born in Naples, where he attended high school. In 1920, he moved to Paris to study law. The following year he abandoned his studies to focus on his interest in art, literature and publishing. In 1923 his first philosophical essay, "The City and the People of Today" was published by Quattrini in Florence. After contributing to magazines such as The Liberal Revolution and Il Baretti, in 1926 he moved to Turin, where he supported himself by working as a mechanic assembler for Fiat.

== Writing ==
After a brief attempt to found his own publishing house, in 1929 Persico moved to Milan, where he worked at Pier Maria Bardi's magazine Belvedere. In 1931 Persico started contributing to Casabella. In 1935 he was appointed co-editor of the magazine with Giuseppe Pagano. Persico was one of the first art journalists to cover the works of Francesco De Rocchi extensively. He was also a fervent supporter of a group of artists in Turin later to be known as the Gruppo dei Sei.

== Galleria Il Milione ==
In 1930, together with Peppino and Gino Ghiringhelli, he co-founded the Galleria Il Milione. Initially focused on Italian art, with particular attention to artists such as Giorgio Morandi, Giorgio de Chirico, Lucio Fontana and Mario Sironi, the gallery quickly earned a solid reputation for introducing to the Italian art scene artists such as Paul Klee, Wassily Kandinsky, Hans Arp and Juan Gris.

== Design ==
During his time at Galleria Il Milione Persico developed an interest in installation design. Influenced by the Rationalist movement, in 1934 he started designing furniture and interiors for exhibition spaces. His most important works were made in collaboration with artist Marcello Nizzoli, and include the Gold Medallion Room at the Aeronautics Exhibition (1934) and the Hall of Honour for the 1936 Milan Triennale, which was completed after his death. For a brief time he also lectured at ISIA (Istituto superiore per le industrie artistiche) in Monza.

Persico was found dead in his home in January 1936 at 35 years old.
