= Alfred H. Barr Jr. =

American art historian (1902–1981)

- Born: Alfred Hamilton Barr Jr. January 28, 1902
- Died: August 15, 1981 (aged 79)
- Education: Boys' Latin School of Maryland; Princeton University (BA, MA); Harvard University (PhD)
- Occupation: Art historian
- Spouse: Margaret Scolari (m. 1930)
- Children: Victoria

Alfred Hamilton Barr Jr. (January 28, 1902 – August 15, 1981) was an American art historian and the first director of the Museum of Modern Art in New York City. From that position, he was one of the most influential forces in the development of popular attitudes toward modern art; for example, his arranging of the blockbuster Van Gogh exhibition of 1935, in the words of author Bernice Kert, was "a precursor to the hold Van Gogh has to this day on the contemporary imagination."

== Life and education ==
Barr's life and work are the subject of Hugh Eakins's 2022 book about efforts by Barr and others to bring Picasso's work, already celebrated in Europe, to the United States. Barr graduated from the Boys' Latin School of Maryland. Barr received his B.A. in 1923 and his M.A. in 1924 from Princeton University, where he studied art history with Frank Jewett Mather and Charles Rufus Morey. In 1924, he began doctoral work at Harvard, but left after completing PhD course requirements to pursue teaching. He was not awarded his PhD until 1946. He married the art historian Margaret Scolari on May 8, 1930, in Paris. They had one daughter, Victoria Barr, who is a painter.

== Career ==
Barr was hired as an associate professor to teach art history at Wellesley College in 1926, where in the same year he offered the first-ever undergraduate course on modern art, "Tradition and Revolt in Modern Painting." This course was notable not only for the novelty of its subject-matter but also for its unconventional pedagogy: Barr referred to all nine students in the class as "faculty", making them each responsible for mastering and teaching some of the course content. Although, per its title, the course ostensibly focused on painting, Barr thought a broad understanding of culture was necessary to understand any individual artistic discipline, and accordingly, the class also studied design, architecture, film, sculpture, and photography. There was no required reading aside from Vanity Fair, The New Yorker, and The New Masses, and the numerous class trips were not to typical locations of art-historical interest. For example, on a trip to Cambridge, the class passed over the wealth of Harvard's museums to experience the "exquisite structural virtuosity", in Barr's words, of the Necco candy factory.

In 1929, Barr was awarded a Carnegie Fellowship, which he intended to use to complete the requirements for his PhD by writing a dissertation during the following academic year on modern art and Cubism at New York University. But greater ambitions obliged him to shelve that intention when Anson Conger Goodyear, acting on the recommendation of Paul J. Sachs, offered Barr the directorship of the newly founded Museum of Modern Art. Assuming the post in August 1929 aged only twenty-seven, Barr's achievements in it accumulated quickly; the Museum held its first loan exhibition in November, on the Post-Impressionists Vincent Van Gogh, Cézanne, Gauguin, and Seurat. Perhaps Barr's most memorable and enduring accomplishment in his directorial capacity was the Picasso retrospective of 1939–1940, which caused a reinterpretation of the artist's work and established the model for all future retrospectives at the Museum. When Barr put Picasso's "Demoiselles" on display in New York in 1939, and declared it 'the beginning of a new period in the history of art', he was also shaping the formalist approach to art. As a formalist he advocated for technical radicalism and the potential of art's formal aspect.

In 1930, Barr married Margaret Scolari, whom he met at the inaugural exhibition of MoMA in 1929.

According to Sybil Gordon Kantor in her book Alfred H. Barr Jr. and the Intellectual Origins of the Museum of Modern Art, Frank Crowninshield art critic, journalist and editor of Vanity Fair, was one of Barr's mentors and one of the founding trustee members of the Museum of Modern Art along with several others.

In 1937 Barr showed Leo Frobenius's collection of drawings and paintings showcasing prehistorical African engravings and stone paintings to great success.

In 1941, in collaboration with his wife and Varian Fry, he helped many artists escape from France, occupied by the Nazis, one of them being Marc Chagall. Barr helped secure American visas as well as the sponsorship of 3000 dollars requested to get the visa. Barr also helped the art dealers Curt Valentin and Otto Kallir to gain entry into America. Both supplied the MoMA with modern works of art. Some of these were subsequently the object of claims for restitutions from the heirs of Jewish collectors that had been looted by the Nazis.

In 1943, Museum of Modern Art president Stephen Carlton Clark dismissed Barr as director of the Museum, though he was allowed to stay on as an advisory director (working with his successor Rene d'Harnoncourt) in part because of the efforts of James Thrall Soby; later Barr was given the title Director of Collections. By the time Barr left MoMA in 1968, modern art would be considered as legitimate an art-historical field of study as earlier eras such as the Renaissance. He was elected a Fellow of the American Academy of Arts and Sciences in 1952.

In recognition of Barr's legacy as an art historian and first director of MoMA, the College Art Association established the Alfred H. Barr Jr. Award for museum scholarship in 1980. The award is given annually to the author of an outstanding catalogue produced through a museum, library, or public or private collection.

== Selected works ==
=== Barr's diagram ===
In 1936 Barr had drawn the "now famous" diagram, originally published on the dust jacket of the MoMA catalog of the exhibition Cubism and Abstract Art. The chart depicted the history of abstract art from 1890s to 1930s. Barr apparently was working on diagrams as early as 1927 while teaching at the Wellesley College.

The vertical (time) axis starts at the top with diverse influences like Japanese prints, synthetism, neo-impressionism, Van Gogh and Cézanne. At the bottom (1935) Barr shows two branches of abstract art that he termed "non-geometrical abstract art" (descending from surrealism and expressionism) and "geometrical abstract art" flowing from suprematism, constructivism, De Stijl, neoplasticism, and machine aesthetic.

=== Books ===
- Picasso: Fifty Years of His Art (1946)
- Matisse, His Art and His Public (1951)
- Cubism and Abstract Art Cambridge: Belknap Press (1986). ISBN 0-674-17935-8
- Art in America in Modern Times (1934)
- Vincent van Gogh, with an introduction and notes selected from the letters of the artist (1935)

=== Essays ===
- "Chronicles." Painting and Sculpture in The Museum of Modern Art 1929–1967. New York: Museum of Modern Art, 1977, 619–650.
