= Etha Fles =

Dutch artist

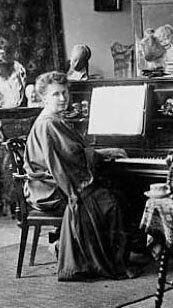
- Etha Fles in her studio in Rome, c. 1911
- Born: Margaretha Tekla Johanna Fles; 1 May 1857; Utrecht, Netherlands
- Died: 31 January 1948 (aged 90); Bergen, Netherlands
- Known for: Painting, Printmaking, Writing

Margaretha "Etha" Tekla Johanna Fles (1857-1948) was a Dutch artist and art critic.

== Biography ==
Fles was born on 1 May 1857 in Utrecht. She attended the Rijksakademie van beeldende kunsten (State Academy of Fine Arts) in Amsterdam. She studied with August Allebé, Adrianus van Everdingen, and Anton Mauve. She was one of the first women admitted to the Academy along with J.H. Derkinderen-Besier, Grada Hermina Marius, and Wally Moes. Fles was a member of Arti et Amicitiae, Nederlandsche Etsclub, the Pulchri Studio, and Vereeniging Voor de Kunst Utrecht.

After leaving Rijksakademie van beeldende kunsten Fles became interested in Impressionism along with the contemporary criticism of William Morris and John Ruskin. She traveled to Paris in 1900 to represent Arti et Amicitiae at the Exposition Universelle. In Paris she met Medardo Rosso (1858-1928) an Italian sculptor with whom she maintained a friendship until his death. She was a patron and mentor, moving to Rome in 1909 to set up her own studio. She returned to the Netherlands for a few years from 1915 to 1917, returning to Italy where she stayed until 1934.

She settled in Bergen where she had previously built a villa. She lived in the villa until 1943 when it was confiscated by the Germans during World War II. She then lived in a monastery in Limburg until the Liberation in 1945 when she returned to Bergen. She died there on 31 January 1948.

Her work is in the collection of the Kröller-Müller Museum, the Rijksmuseum and the Drents Museum.

== Gallery ==
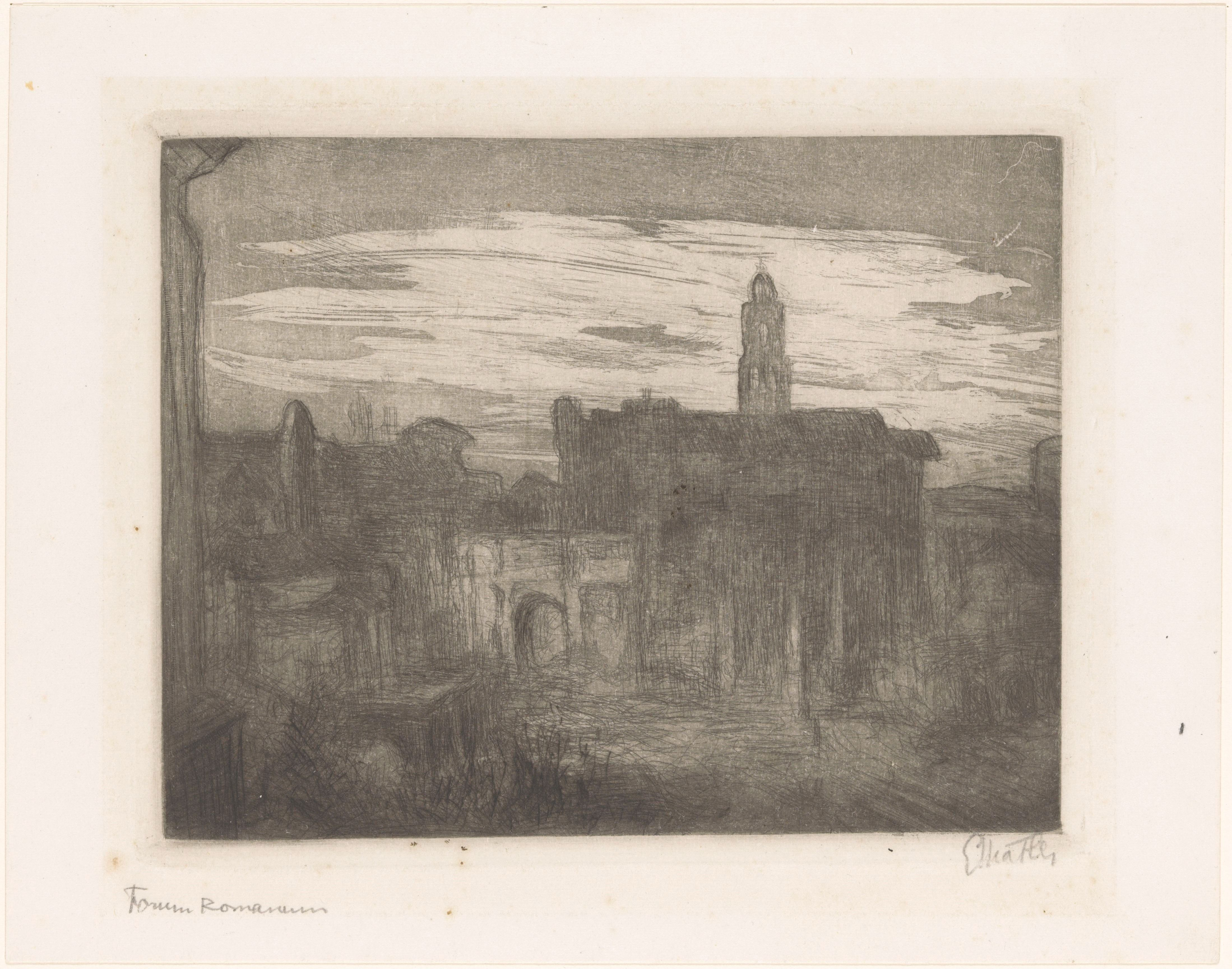
Forum Romanum

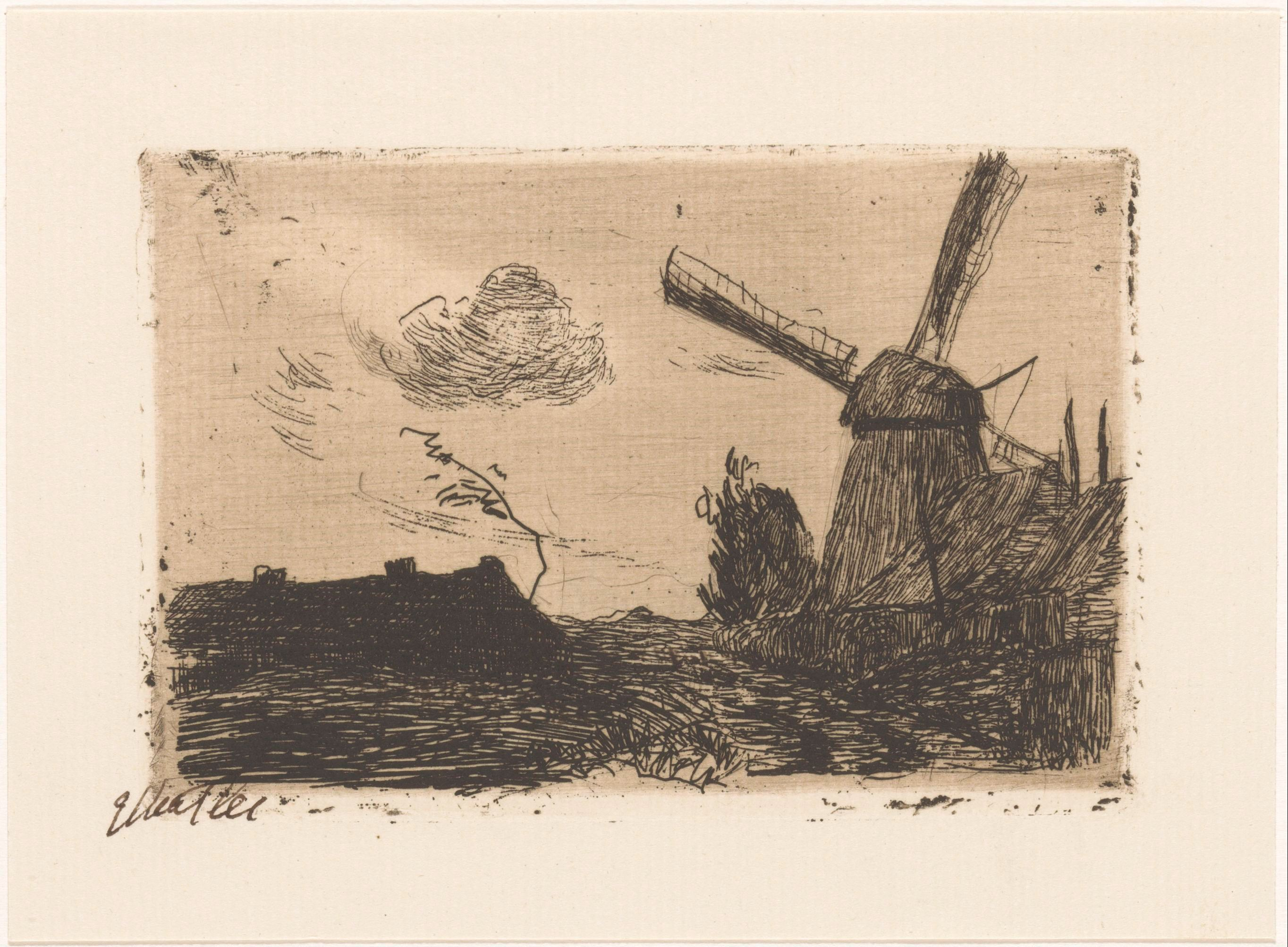
Molen bij een boerderij

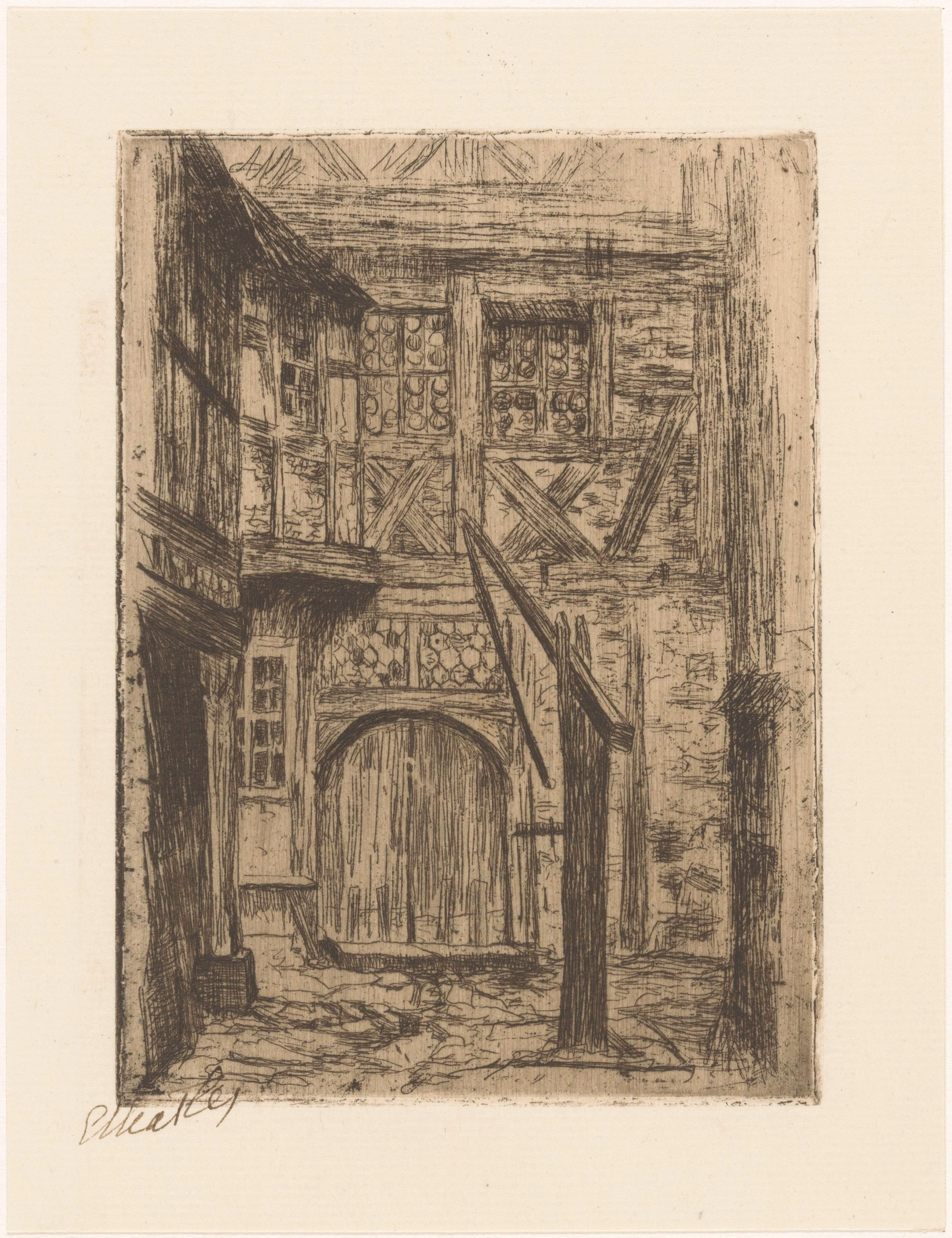
Rothenburg
