= Medardo Rosso =

Italian sculptor

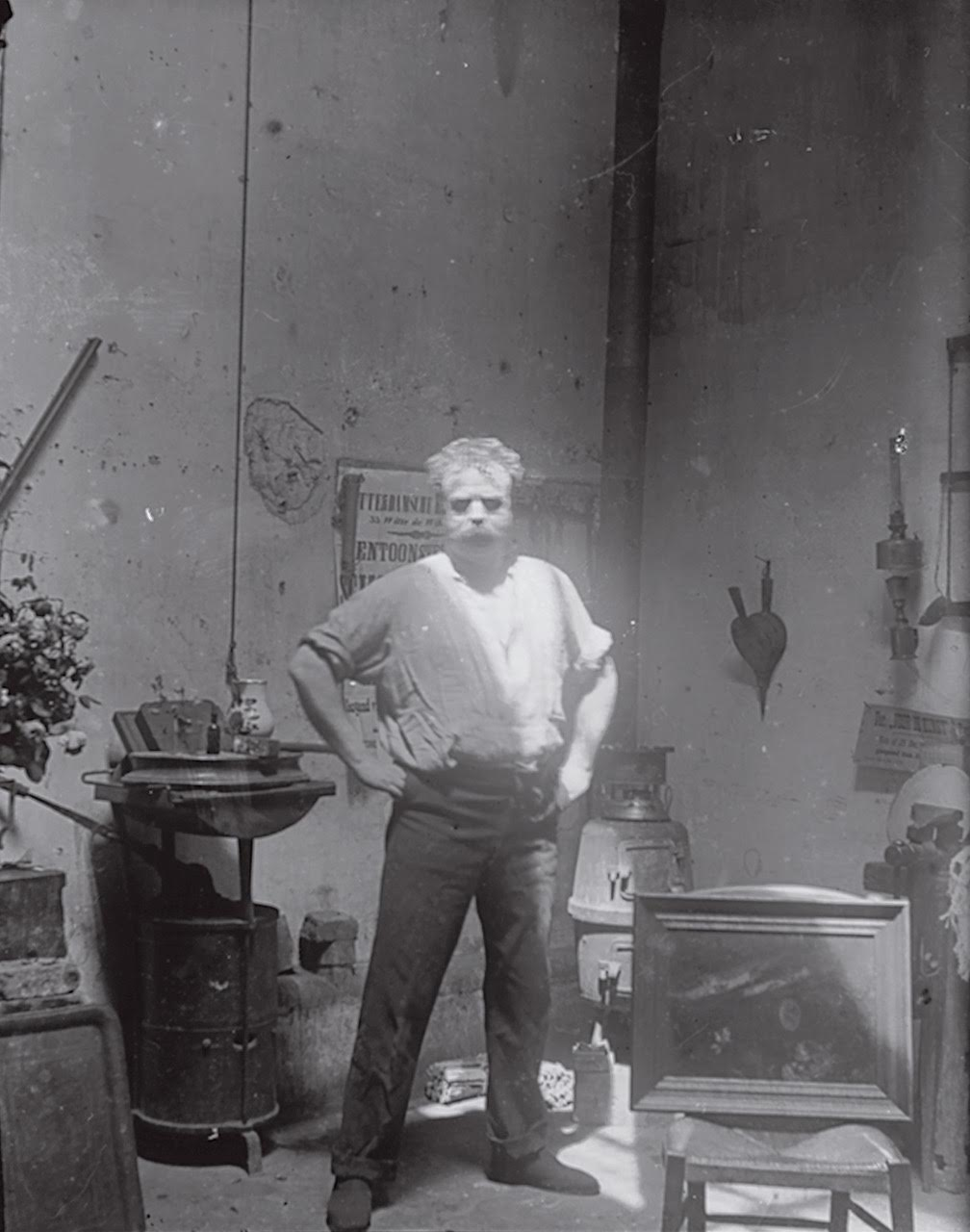
- Self-Portrait in the Studio on the Boulevard des Batignolles, post 1901
- Born: 21 June 1858; Turin, Italy
- Died: 31 March 1928 (aged 69); Milan, Italy
- Known for: Sculpture, Photography
- Patrons: Henri Rouart, Etha Fles

Medardo Rosso (Italian: [meˈdardo ˈrosso]; 21 June 1858 – 31 March 1928) was an Italian sculptor. He is considered, like his contemporary and admirer Auguste Rodin, to have been an artist working in a post-Impressionist style.

== Biography and works ==
Rosso was born in Turin, where his father worked as a railway station inspector, and the family moved to Milan when Rosso was twelve. At the age of 24, after a spell in the army, Rosso enrolled at the Brera Academy, from which he would soon be expelled after punching a student who refused to sign a petition that Rosso had circulated demanding that live models and body parts be used for the drawing classes, which was standard practice in Italian academies at the time. In his 1889 almanac of living artists, Angelo de Gubernatis offered a romanticized portrait of Rosso's early years as an artist:

(He) rebelled at each school, with each method, with each Academy, abhorring anything that smacked of trade, of artifice, and soon found himself alone, without support, without a master, without counsellors, and with a bunch of captive and envious colleagues who tripped him when he tried his way and to demonstrate his abilities, his ingenuity. But the Biblical saying "Go alone!" did not frighten him; even in those long daily vigils struggling with a whole system which for many years had triumphed, despite the strong supporters of this and that opponent, he felt his strength increase, developed his talent, he conceived a vast new artistic horizon never before seen, and began to work and hold it to the test.

Starting in 1881 in Milan, Rosso began producing bronze busts and figures that reflected largely Realist influences, with works such as The Hooligan (1882) and Kiss Under the Lamppost (1882). Rosso's style began to change after 1882, possibly due to the discovery of Impressionism, and some of his first works during this period, including Portinaia (Concierge) (1883–84) and Carne altrui (Flesh of Others) (1883–84), begin to "suggest a loss of detail in favour of sketchy modelling, flattened planes, and gently modulated surfaces to soften the play of light and shadow." Rosso never made preparatory drawings for his sculptures, opting instead to work directly with the clay from which he would then make a working model in plaster, which was then used to create the negative mould into which he would cast in bronze using the cire perdue method; he also cast works in plaster, and, much later, wax with a plaster interior. Some art historians have suggested that Rosso travelled to Paris in 1884 and worked in the studio of sculptor Jules Dalou, but no historical record has corroborated this. In Milan, Rosso continued to cast small-scale works throughout the mid-1880s, in addition to a series of entries for public monuments, such as a funeral monument to the critic Filippo Filippi.

Rosso relocated to Paris in 1889, where he would live and work until after World War I. While in Paris, he met and impressed a number of influential personalities, including writer Emile Zola, whom Rosso convinced to say that he owned a cast of Birichino, thereby elevating the artist's stature, as well as the engineer and patron of the Impressionists Henri Rouart, of whom Rosso cast a portrait in bronze by 1890. During his Parisian period, Rosso also began to experiment with photography in his studio, and he photographed the works under a variety of lighting conditions, foci, and compositions in order to capture different impressions of these three-dimensional works, often further manipulating the printing process and cropping, folding, scratching, or painting the photographic prints to create focused glimpses of the sculptural subjects.

As a sculptor, one of Rosso's principal concerns was to subject the physical mass of sculpture to the transient and ephemeral effects of light. So by means of rough, spontaneous modelling, he would then cast in bronze, plaster, or wax. Rosso maintained a studio in Paris in which he created his own foundry, at a time when most sculptors sent their moulds away to professional foundries to be cast. This freedom afforded Rosso the opportunity to manipulate the surfaces of his works in highly unorthodox ways, often retaining what others would have regarded as "casting errors" and electing not to clean away the plaster investment that would be left upon a bronze work after casting. To Rosso, these interventions were designed to create visual or optical effects by which the materiality of sculpture, as central as it was to his practice, was subordinate to the impression of the viewer:

Light being of the very essence of our existence, a work of art that is not concerned with light has no right to exist. Without light it must lack unity and spaciousness — it is bound to be small, paltry, wrongly conceived, based necessarily upon matter.... A work of sculpture is not made to be touched, but to be seen at such or such a distance, according to the effect intended by the artist. Our hand does not permit us to bring to our consciousness the values, the bones, the colours—in a word, the life of the thing. For seizing the inner significance of a work of art, we should rely entirely on the visual impression and on the sympathetic echoes it awakens in our memory and consciousness, and not on the touch of our fingers.

Rosso maintained his studio in Paris, where he exhibited his sculptures and sold works to major collectors and museums. He established a friendship with Auguste Rodin, and the two artists exchanged works, although their relationship dissolved when, following a debate about artistic influence in the press, an embittered Rosso felt Rodin had failed to acknowledge his debt to him. In 1906, Rosso realized his last original subject with the work Ecce puer (Behold the Child); following series of unsuccessful attempts to create a portrait of a five-year-old Alfred William Mond, Rosso happened to glimpse him standing later behind a drawn curtain, inspiring the impression conveyed by the finished work. In the last twenty years of his life, he created no new original subjects but focused on recasting previous works in different ways. Toward the end of his life, he suffered from diabetes and died in Milan, aged 70, after the amputation of the affected leg in 1928.

== Scholarship and Posthumous Exhibitions ==
From 2 October to 23 November 1963, The Museum of Modern Art in New York presented Medardo Rosso, 1858-1928, the first major museum exhibition of the artist's work in the United States. In the exhibition catalogue, curator Margaret Scolari Barr wrote that "Rosso's art is complex, ambiguous, his vision poetic as much as objective." Margaret Scholar Barr's was the first English-language monograph on the Italian modernist sculptor.

From 17 October 2014 to 27 June 2015, the Center for Italian Modern Art presented an installation of sculpture, drawing, and experimental photography by the modernist artist, which revealed the range of an artist known primarily for his three-dimensional work. From 11 November 2016 to 13 May 2017, the Pulitzer Arts Foundation in St. Louis is presenting Medardo Rosso: Experiments in Light and Form, the largest exhibition of the artist's work in a US museum since the 1963 MoMA show. This show was curated by Sharon Hecker and Tamara S. Schenkenberg.

== List of key works ==
- Portinaia (Concierge), 1883
- Carne altrui (Flesh of Others), 1883–84
- Impressione d'omnibus (Impression of an Omnibus), 1884–87 (Destroyed)
- Aetas aurea (Golden Age), late 1885–86
- Enfant au sein (Child at the Breast), late 1889-90
- Bambino ebreo (Jewish Boy), 1892
- Bookmaker, 1893–95
- Enfant malade (Sick Child), 1893–95
- Yvette Guilbert, 1895
- Madame X, 1896
- Ecce puer, 1906

== Select sculptures ==
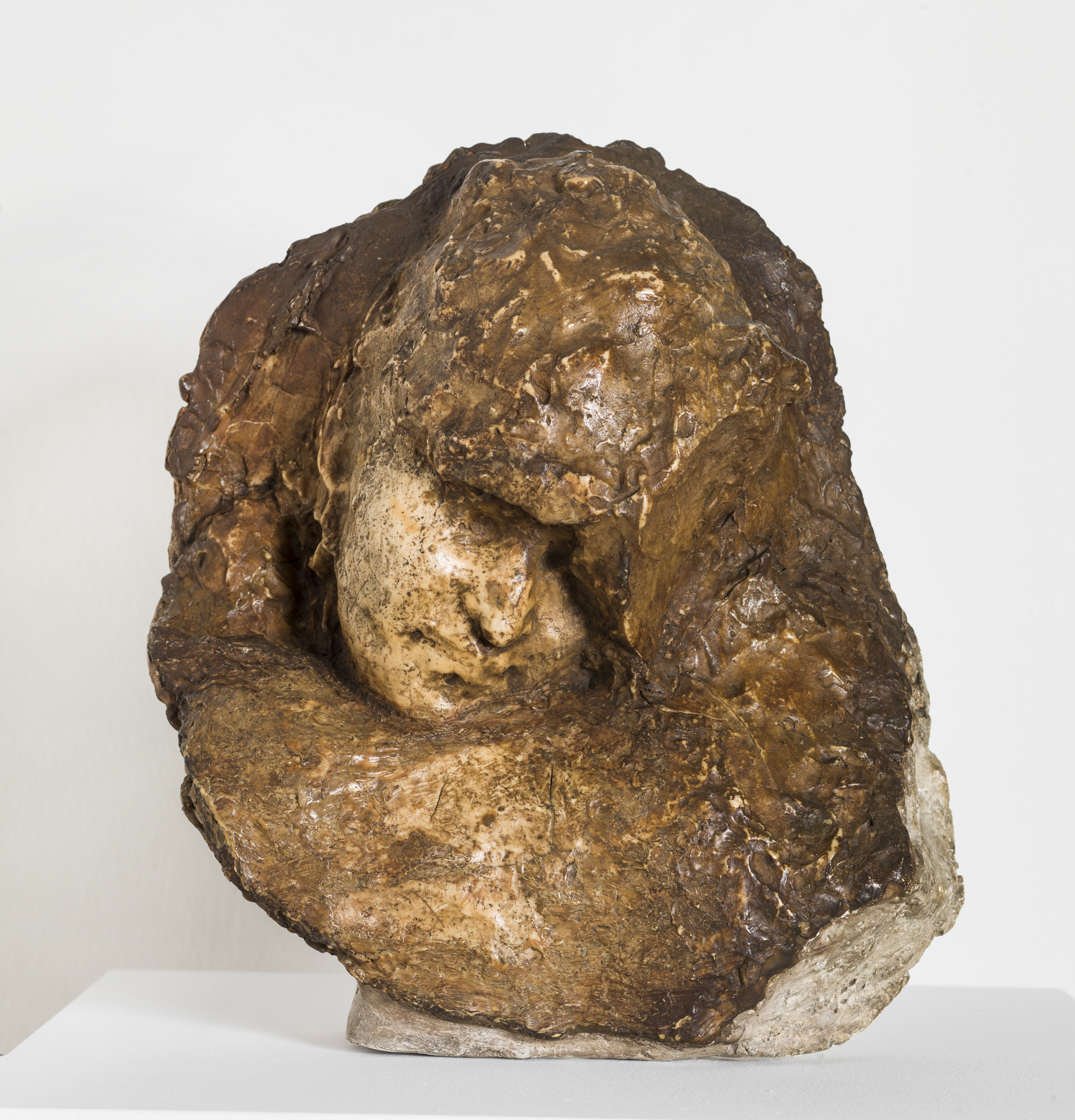
Carne altrui (Flesh of Others), 1883–84

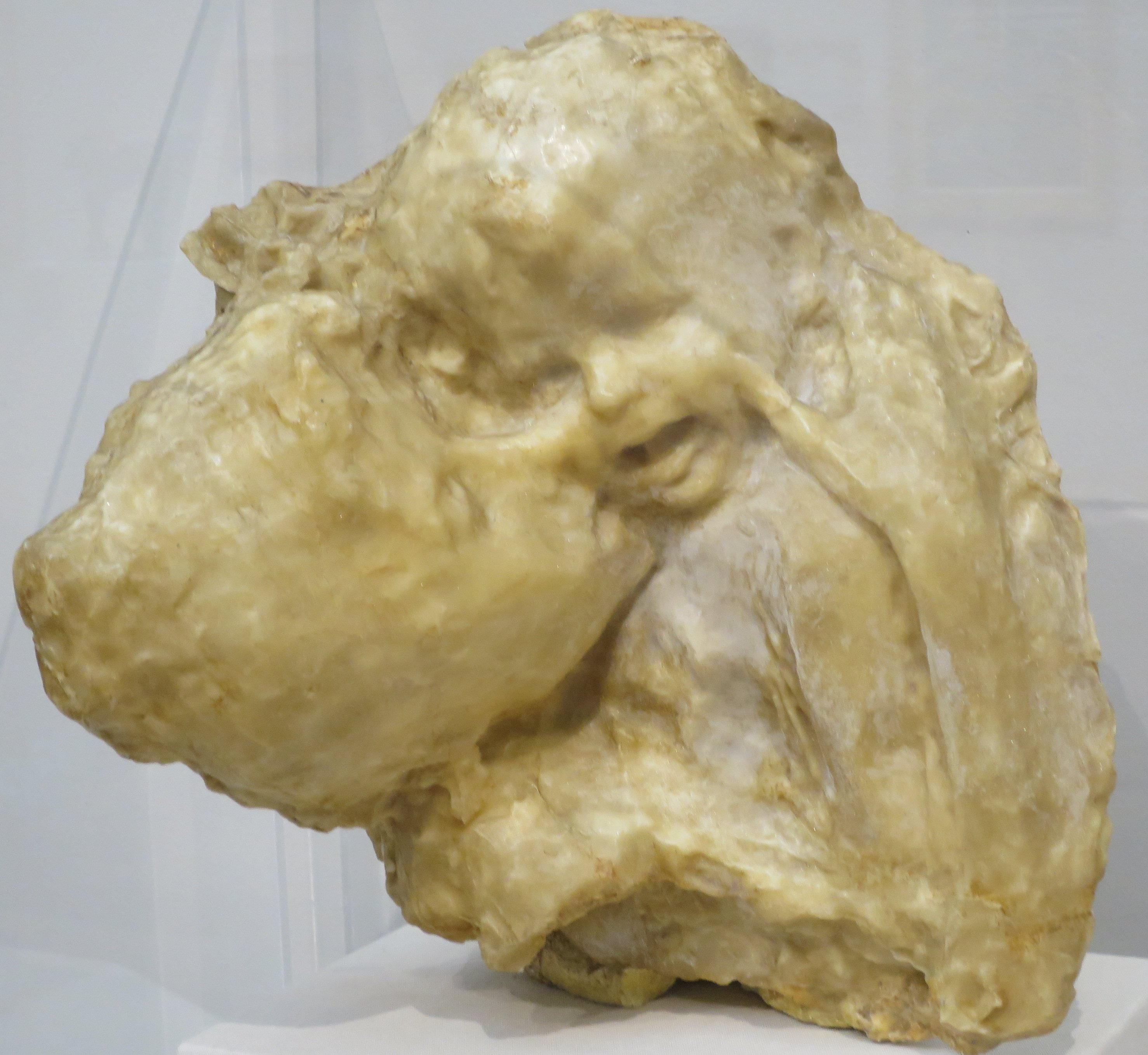
Aetas aurea (Golden Age), late 1885-86

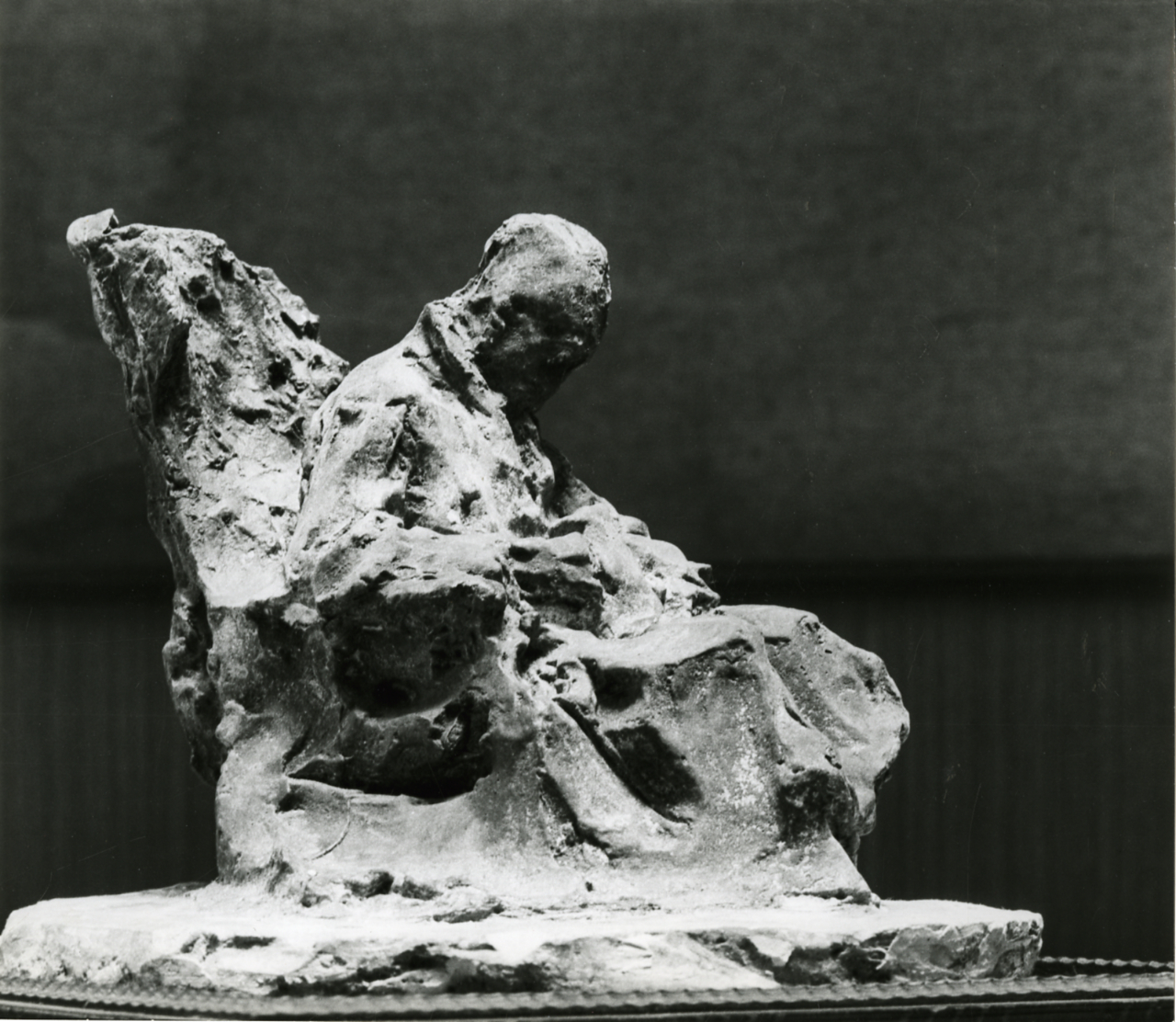
Malato all'ospedale, 1889

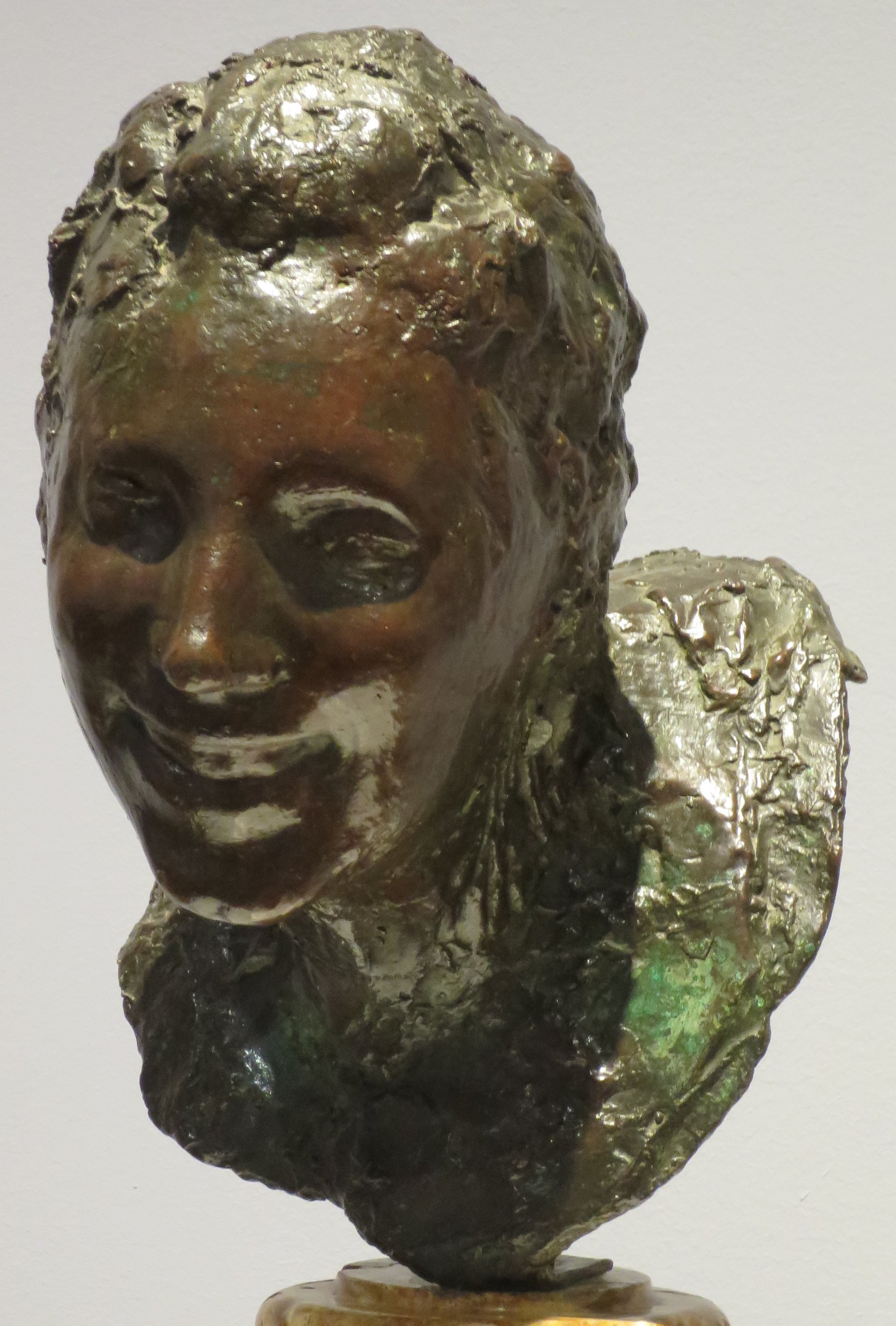
Petite femme riant, 1890

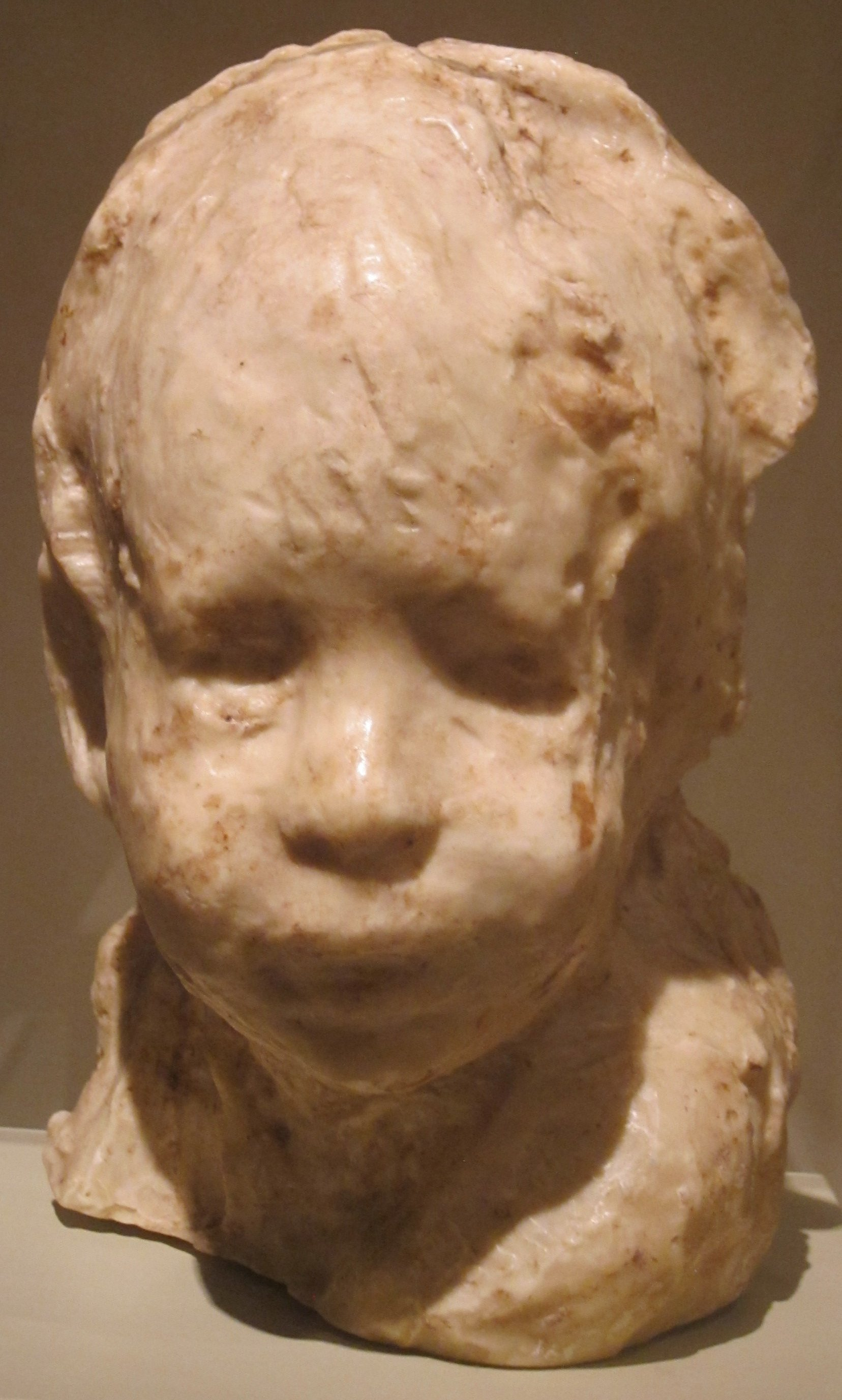
Bambino ebreo (Jewish Boy), 1892–94

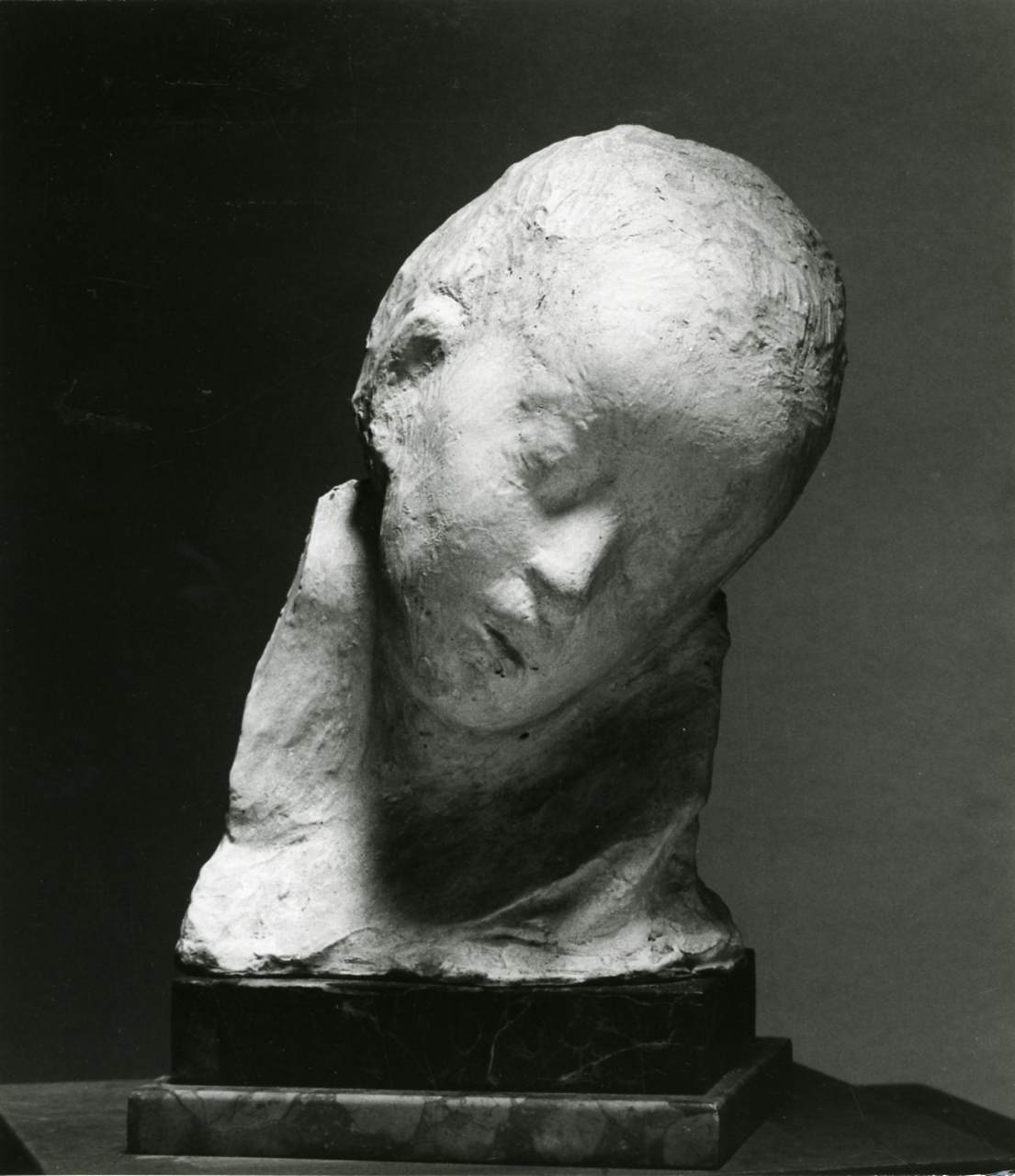
Enfant malade (Sick Child), 1893–94

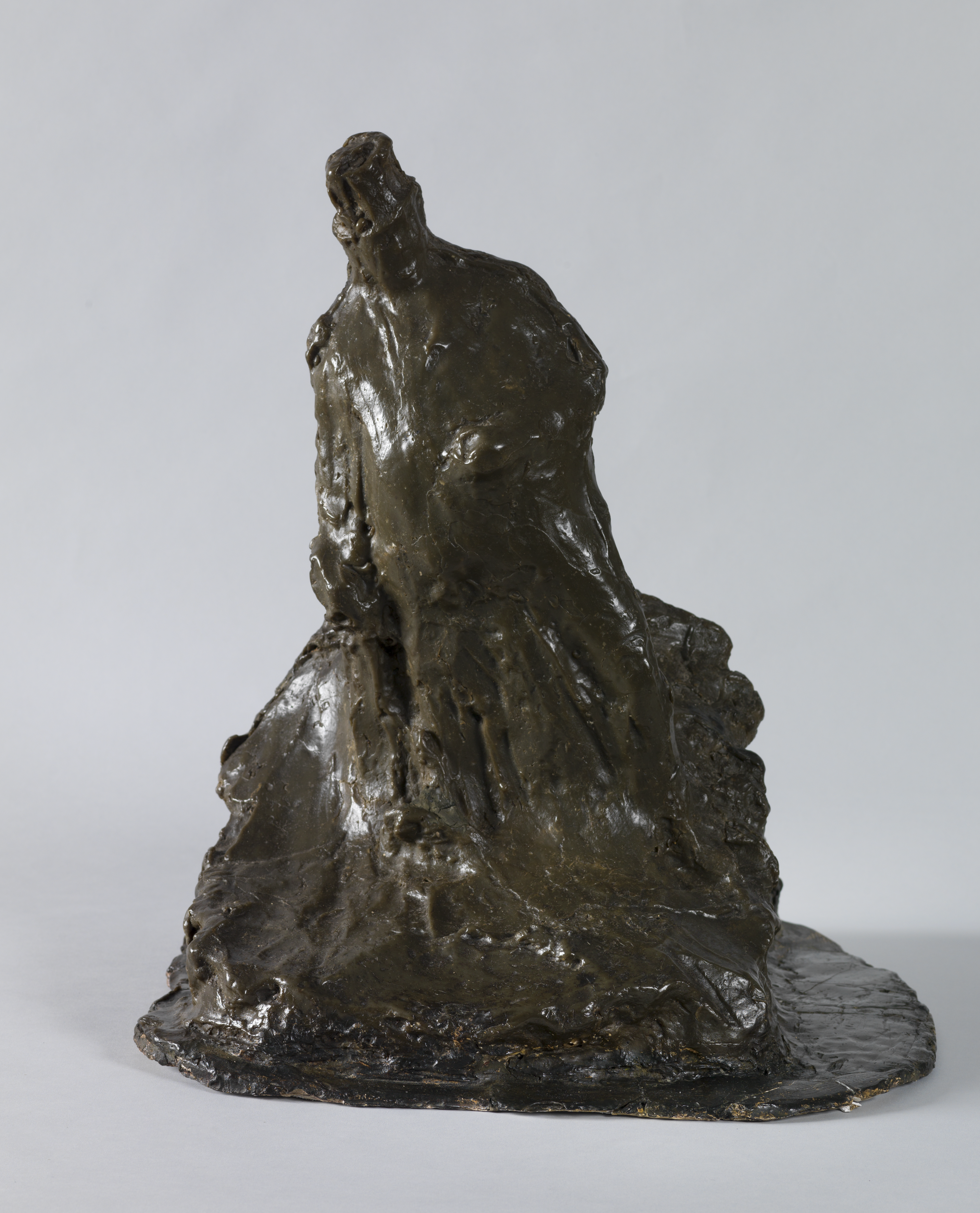
Bookmaker, 1893–95

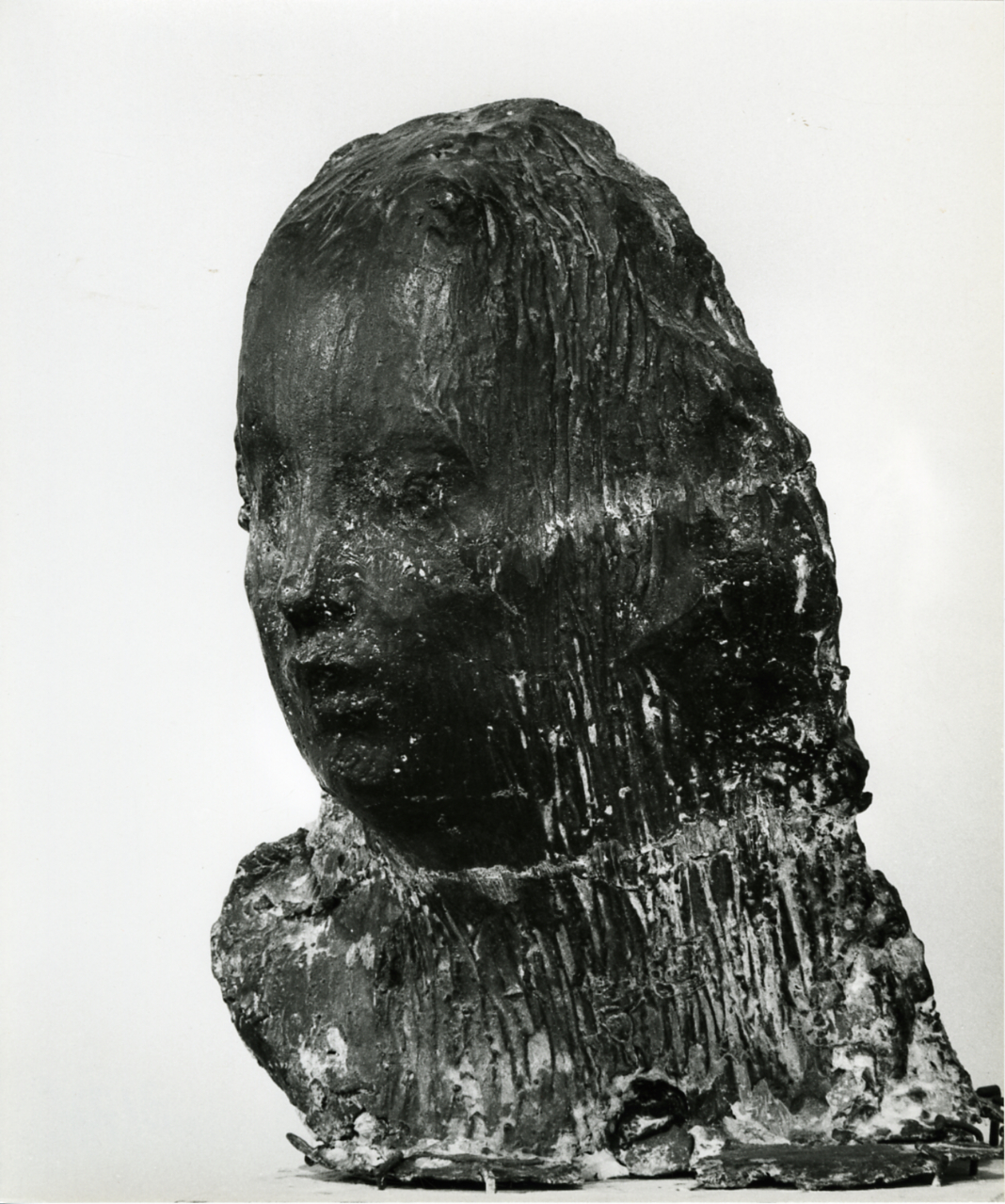
Ecce Puer, 1906

== Bibliography ==
- Mino Borghi, Medardo Rosso, Edizioni del Milione, 1950
- Nino Barbantini, Medardo Rosso, N. Pozza, 1950
- Margaret Scolari Barr, Medardo Rosso, Museum of Modern Art, 1963
- Alis Levi, Souvenirs d’une enfant de la Belle Époque. Roma, De Luca Editori, 1970
- Medardo Rosso, and Luciano Caramel. Medardo Rosso: Impressions in Wax and Bronze, 1882-1906. New York: Kent Fine Art, 1988.
- Sharon Hecker, "Medardo Rosso's first commission." The Burlington Magazine 138:1125 (1996): 817-822.
- Sharon Hecker, "L’esordio milanese di Medardo Rosso." Bolletino dell’Accademia degli Euteleti, 65 (1998): 185-201.
- Sharon Hecker, "Ambivalent Bodies: Medardo Rosso's Brera Petition." The Burlington Magazine 142:1173 (2000): 773-777.
- Sharon Hecker, "Medardo Rosso," s.v., The Encyclopedia of Sculpture, Vol. 3, P-Z, Ed. Antonia Boström. New York and London: Routledge, 2000. 1470-1473.
- Giovanni Lista, Cristina Maiocchi, "Medardo Rosso: Scultura e Fotografia", 5 Continents, 2003
- Sharon Hecker, "Reflections on Repetition in the Sculpture of Medardo Rosso." Medardo Rosso: Second Impressions. (exh. cat., Harvard Art Museums). Harry Cooper and Sharon Hecker. New Haven and London: Yale University Press, 2003.
- Sharon Hecker, "Fleeting Revelations: The Demise of Duration in Medardo Rosso's Wax Sculpture." Ephemeral Bodies: Wax Sculpture and the Human Figure. Ed. R. Panzanelli. Getty Research Institute Issues and Debates Book Series. Los Angeles: J.P. Getty Trust, 2008. 131-153.
- Medardo Rosso. Catalogo ragionato della scultura a cura di Paola Mola, Fabio Vittucci, Skira, 2009
- Sharon Hecker, "An Enfant Malade by Medardo Rosso from the Collection of Louis Vauxcelles," The Burlington Magazine 152:1292 (2010): 727-735.
