= James Thrall Soby =

- Born: December 14, 1906; Hartford, Connecticut, U.S.
- Died: January 29, 1979 (aged 72); Norwalk, Connecticut, U.S.
- Education: Kingswood School; Taft School; Williams College
- Occupations: Art historian; Curator; Art collector
- Known for: Director and Chairman of Painting and Sculpture at the Museum of Modern Art
- Spouses: Elmina Allyn Nettleton Underwood (m. 1927); Eleanor Howland (m. 1938); Melissa Wadley (m. 1952)
- Children: 1 (adopted)

James Thrall Soby (1906–1979) was an American art historian, curator, and collector.

== Life & education ==
James Thrall Soby was born in Hartford, CT on December 14, 1906. His parents were Charles Soby (died 1921) and Anna Juliet Hazelwood Soby (1877–1956). He had one older brother, Ralph Soby (1903–1956). His father was in the cigar business and was an early investor in pay telephone, which afforded them a comfortable life. Soby received his early education at two prestigious private schools in Connecticut: Kingswood and Taft. After graduating from Taft in 1924, he attended Williams College in Massachusetts.

In 1926, as a sophomore at Williams, he left school to pursue his own interests. His obituary for the New York Times states that "he left college and took up the life of independent connoisseurship, for which an abundant private income ideally equipped him." Returning to Connecticut from Paris, he lived and worked in that state before moving to New York in 1940. However, he kept a house in CT. From 1935 to ca. 1954, he owned the "Hooker House" in Farmington, CT. This historic house was built in 1811. Soby hired Henry-Russell Hitchcock to design an addition to the home to serve as an international style gallery.

Soby had three marriages. He married Elmina Allyn Nettleton Underwood in 1927, Eleanor “Nellie” Howland in 1938, and Melissa Wadley in 1952. His second wife, Eleanor, was also an art collector. The two adopted a son, Peter Allyn.

Soby was at the center of artistic and intellectual circles on the East Coast. In addition to his collecting and professional work, he was often sought out to support artists with their own collections. For instance, Soby was friends with Kay Sage and, after her passing, helped her estate executor and gallerist Pierre Matisse find a home for her large collection of work by herself and her husband Yves Tanguy.

The manuscript of Soby's unpublished memoir is currently held in the MoMA archives. This is part of his larger collection of papers held there. Another collection of his papers are held at the Getty Research Institute in California. In 1970, Soby was interviewed for the Archives of American Art oral history project.

Soby died in hospital in Norwalk, CT on January 29, 1979.

== Career ==
After leaving Williams, Soby traveled to Paris for two years collecting contemporary art. Upon his return in 1928, he began working under A. Everett ("Chick") Austin at the Wadsworth Atheneum. He worked there for a decade. In 1931, Soby curated an exhibition of Surrealism, and in 1934, he curated a show on Picasso. The work from this latter exhibition was published in the book After Picasso in 1935.

After his time at the Wadsworth, he started his career at the Museum of Modern Art. In 1940, he served on the Acquisitions and Photography committee. In 1942, he became a Trustee of the museum. In 1943, he became the Director of the Department of Painting and Sculpture, after Barr's dismissal. Soby had worked with Barr and recognized his work. Scholar Sybill Gordon Kantor wrote that Soby "was incensed that Barr had been asked to step down" and that, after persuading members of the Board of Trustees, "managed to keep Barr in the Museum." Soby continued working in this position until 1945, after which he became chairman of that department on an interim basis until 1957. In 1957, Soby was appointed Chairman of the Department of Painting and Sculpture officially.

Over the course of his career, he also was an amateur photographer. Some of his works are now in the collection of the Art Institute of Chicago.

== Collection ==
He started collecting art as a young man, buying his first work in 1925. He focused on contemporary European artists like Pablo Picasso (he purchased his first in 1931, the 1927 Seated Woman, now at MoMA), Henri Matisse, André Derain, Joan Miró (his Still Life with Old Shoe was given to MoMA by Soby), Juan Gris, Paul Klee, Giorgio Di Chirico, and more. In his early life, after returning from Paris, he worked with collector Valentine Dudensing's Valentine Gallery to acquire new European works.

He was also a collector of contemporary American art. He one of the early patrons of important American artist Alexander Calder, whom Soby commissioned a large sculpture for his home (the Hooker House) in 1935.

In 1961, Vogue published an article by Allene Talmey titled "James Thrall Soby: A Venturous Collector of 20th Century Works of Art who lives in a Victorian House."

A large portion of his collection was bequeathed to the Museum of Modern Art, for which they held an exhibition in 1979.

== Exhibitions curated ==
He oversaw, curated, or co-curated at least fourteen exhibitions over the course of his career.

=== Exhibitions curated at the Museum of Modern Art ===
- 1941-42 - Salvador Dalí
- 1942 - Tchelitchew: Paintings and Drawings
- 1944 - Romantic Painting in America (co-curated with Dorothy Miller)
- 1945 - Georges Rouault
- 1947 - Twentieth Century Italian Art (co-curated with Alfred H. Barr Jr.)
- 1947-48 - Ben Shahn
- 1951 - Modigliani
- 1955 - Yves Tanguy
- 1956-57 - Balthus
- 1958 - Jean Arp: A Retrospective
- 1958 - Juan Gris
- 1959 - Joan Miró
- 1964 - Bonnard and His Environment
- 1966 - René Magritte

== Publications ==
Soby was a prolific writer. He wrote a monthly art column for The Saturday Review of Literature as well as his various books and exhibition catalogues on art.

=== Books and exhibition catalogues ===
- 1935 - After Picasso
- 1941 (revised 1946) - Dali
- 1941 - Giorgio Di Chirico
- 1942 - Tchelitchew
- 1945 (revised 1947) - Romantic Painting in America (with Dorothy Miller)
- 1945 - George Rouault: Painting and Prints
- 1945 - Ben Shahn
- 1946 - The Prints of Paul Klee
- 1948 - Twentieth Century Italian Art (with Alfred H. Barr Jr.)
- 1948 - Contemporary Painters
- 1951 - Modigliani
- 1955 - Yves Tanguy
- 1955 - Giorgio Di Chirico
- 1956-57 - Balthus
- 1957 - Modern Art and the New Past
- 1957 - New art in America : fifty painters of the 20th century (with John I H Baur, Lloyd Goodrich, Dorothy Canning Miller, and Frederick S Wight)
- 1958 - Arp
- 1958 - Gris
- 1959 -Miró
