= Mario Radice =

Italian painter

Mario Radice (10 August 1898 – 26 July 1987) was an Italian painter born in Como. He is considered to be an important Italian abstract artist.

== Life and work ==
Mario Radice, together with Manlio Rho, Aldo Galli, Carla Badiali and others, belonged to the art group named "astrattisti comaschi", a reference to early European experiences of abstract art.

He was fascinated by rationalist architecture and was one of the first Italian artists to break from figurative art to join the abstract movement flourishing across Europe at the time.

Radice worked closely with the most important Italian rationalist architects (Terragni, Lingeri, Sartoris and Cattaneo), reaching international popularity with abstract frescoes done between 1933 and 1936 for the famous Casa del Fascio of Como, a masterpiece municipal building by Giuseppe Terragni for the National Fascist Party. Eventually the frescoes were destroyed at the end of World War II but photographic documentation still exists.

His works were shown in nine Venice Biennale from 1940 to 1979, in which he was exhibited in a personal room on three occasions. Recently (2007) some of his works were included in two big exhibits held in Milan's Royal Palace: Camera con vista and Kandinskji and Italian abstract art.

Like the works of the other founder of the Italian abstractist school, Manlio Rho, Radice's art is recognizable for pure and harmonic geometric shapes in warm colors.

Radice's works can be found in the permanent collections of many modern art museums, including those of Milan, Trento, Rovereto, Turin and Rome.

== See also ==
- Abstract art
- Manlio Rho

== Sources ==
- This article draws from the corresponding article in the Italian Wikipedia.
