= Manlio Rho =

Italian painter (1901–1957)

- Born: 1901; Como, Lombardy, Italy
- Died: 1957 (aged 55–56)
- Occupation: Artist
- Known for: Abstract art

Manlio Rho (1901 – 1957) was a painter born in Como, Italy. He is considered one of the most important abstract artists in Italy.

== Life and work ==
In the late 1920s, Rho was deeply involved in Como's engagement with the European abstract movement led by Wassily Kandinsky and Kazimir Malevich. Together with the architects Giuseppe Terragni, Alberto Sartoris, and the painter Mario Radice, he created the astrattisti comaschi, a group of artists that later included Aldo Galli, Carla Prina, and Carla Badiali. This event is widely regarded by critics as a pivotal moment in the history of Italian art of the 20th century.

Having worked initially in a figurative manner, he began abstract works in the early 1930s, showing a consistent preference for colour and the harmony of shapes.

Rho's art is marked by a balance between strict geometry, similar to the "cold" abstractism of Russian suprematism, and a warmth considered typically North Italian. His works comprise flat geometric shapes glowing with lukewarm colours in a palette of greens, browns and orange.

In 1940, he signed the futurist manifesto Futuristi Primordiali Antonio Sant'Elia.

== Shows ==
In 1935, he had his first important exhibition in the Milan art gallery Il Milione. His works have been shown at nine separate Venice Biennale from 1940 to 1986, and in numerous exhibitions around the world. In 2007, some of his works were included in two large exhibitions held in Milan's Royal Palace: Camera con vista and Kandinskji and Italian Abstract Art.

Rho's works can be found in the permanent collections of many modern art museums, including Milan, Trento and Rovereto, Trieste and Rome.

== Sources ==
- This article draws from the corresponding article in the Italian Wikipedia.
