= Lucio Fontana =

Italian painter

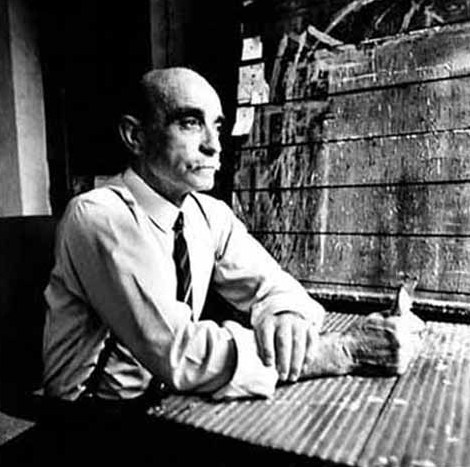
- Fontana in a photograph by Lothar Wolleh
- Born: 19 February 1899; Rosario, Santa Fe, Argentina
- Died: 7 September 1968 (aged 69); Comabbio, Varese, Italy
- Education: Brera Academy, Milan
- Known for: Painting, sculpture
- Movement: Spatialism

Lucio Fontana (Italian: [ˈluːtʃo fonˈtaːna]; 19 February 1899 – 7 September 1968) was an Argentine-Italian sculptor, painter, and theorist. He is known as the founder of Spatialism and exponent of abstraction. Some of these ideas can be seen in his slashed canvases and his use of neon as a media, like his Milan Triennale piece (now at the Museo del Novecento in Milan).

== Early life ==
Born in Rosario, Santa Fe, Argentina, to Italian immigrant parents, he was the son of the sculptor Luigi Fontana (1865–1946). Fontana spent the first years of his life in Argentina and then was sent to Italy in 1905, where he stayed until 1922, working as a sculptor with his father, and then on his own. Already in 1926, he participated in the first exhibition of Nexus, a group of young Argentine artists working in Rosario de Santa Fé.

== Work ==
Fontana joined the Fascist movement at an early stage and is documented as a member of the Fasci di Combattimento as early as 1920.

From 1922 onwards, he again lived for several years in Argentina, where he worked in his father’s sculpture studio and was employed briefly as an engineer and for a longer period as a sculptor. In 1927 Fontana returned to Italy and studied alongside Fausto Melotti under the sculptor Adolfo Wildt, at Accademia di Brera from 1928 to 1930. It was there he presented his first exhibition in 1930, organized by the Milan art gallery Il Milione.

He also participated in the 17. Biennale di Venezia. with the sculpture Vittoria fascista (“Fascist Victory”). Fontana created his first bust of Benito Mussolini in 1930. In 1933, this was followed by the bust Expectation, depicting a nude youthful hero wearing the neckerchief of the Fascist Party’s youth organization, and the statue Victorious Woman for the Air Force, although the latter declined to acquire it in 1934.

In 1936, Fontana’s Victory Group was exhibited in the Hall of Honour at the Milan Triennale, which, on the occasion of the Fascist invasion of Ethiopia, had been renamed the “Hall of Triumph.” A bust by Fontana intended for Addis Ababa and commissioned by the Ministry of Propaganda was ultimately never realized. In 1936, the newly built headquarters of the Federazione dei Fasci Milanesi received Italy’s largest bas-relief. Across the ceiling, five armed winged Victories fly overhead, laden with spoils of war. This so-called “Shrine of the Fascist Martyrs” was converted into a Carabinieri station after the Second World War.

In 1935 he joined the association Abstraction-Création in Paris and from 1936 to 1949 made expressionist sculptures in ceramic and bronze. In 1939, he joined the Corrente, a Milan group of expressionist artists.

In 1940 he returned to Argentina. In Buenos Aires (1946) he founded the Altamira academy together with some of his students, and made public the White Manifesto, which states: "Matter, colour and sound in motion are the phenomena whose simultaneous development makes up the new art". In the text, which Fontana did not sign but to which he actively contributed, he began to formulate the theories that he was to expand as Spazialismo, or Spatialism, in five manifestos from 1947 to 1952. Upon his return from Argentina in 1947, he supported, along with writers and philosophers, the first manifesto of spatialism (Spazialismo)**. Fontana's studio and works were completely destroyed in the Allied bombings of Milan, but he soon resumed his ceramics works in Albisola. In Milan, he collaborated with noted Milanese architects to decorate several new buildings that were part of the effort to reconstruct the city after the war.

Following his return to Italy in 1948 Fontana exhibited his first Ambiente spaziale a luce nera ('Spatial environment') (1949) at the Galleria del Naviglio in Milan, a temporary installation consisting of a giant amoeba-like shape suspended in the void in a darkened room and lit by neon light. From 1949 on he started the so-called Spatial Concept or slash series, consisting in holes or slashes on the surface of monochrome paintings, drawing a sign of what he named "an art for the Space Age". He devised the generic title Concetto spaziale ('spatial concept') for these works and used it for almost all his later paintings. These can be divided into broad categories: the Buchi ('holes'), beginning in 1949, and the Tagli ('slashes'), which he instituted in the mid-1950s.

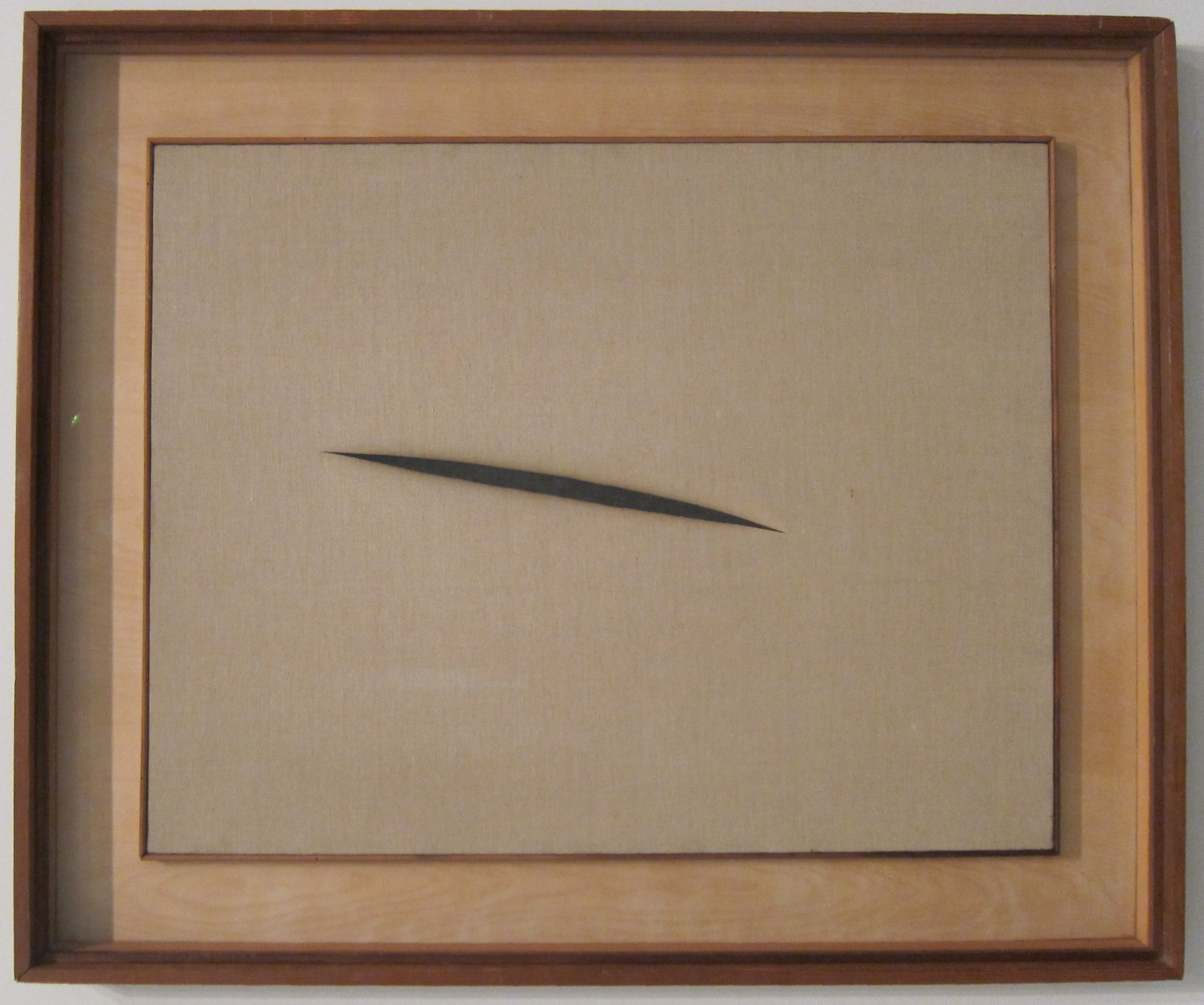
Spatial Concept "Waiting", Lucio Fontana, 1960

Fontana often lined the reverse of his canvases with black gauze so that the darkness would shimmer behind the open cuts and create a mysterious sense of illusion and depth. He then created an elaborate neon ceiling called "Luce spaziale" in 1951 for the Triennale in Milan. In his important series of Concetto spaziale, La Fine di Dio (1963–64), Fontana uses the egg shape. With his Pietre (stones) series, begun in 1952, Fontana fused the sculptural with painting by encrusting the surfaces of his canvases with heavy impasto and colored glass. In his Buchi (holes) cycle, begun in 1949–50, he punctured the surface of his canvases, breaking the membrane of two-dimensionality in order to highlight the space behind the picture. From 1958 he purified his paintings by creating matte, monochrome surfaces, thus focusing the viewer's attention on the slices that rend the skin of the canvas. In 1959 Fontana exhibited cut-off paintings with multiple combinable elements (he named the sets quanta), and began Nature, a series of sculptures made by cutting a gash across a sphere of terracotta clay, which he subsequently cast in bronze.

Fontana engaged in many collaborative projects with important architects of the day, particularly Luciano Baldessari, who shared and supported his research for Spatial Light – Structure in Neon (1951) at the 9th Triennale and, among other things, commissioned him to design the ceiling of the cinema in the Sidercomit Pavilion at the 21st Milan Fair in 1953.

Around 1960, Fontana began to reinvent the cuts and punctures that had characterized his highly personal style up to that point, covering canvases with layers of thick oil paint applied by hand and brush and using a scalpel or utility knife to create great fissures in their surface. In 1961, following an invitation to participate along with artists Jean Dubuffet, Mark Rothko, Sam Francis, and others in an exhibition of contemporary painting entitled "Art and Contemplation", held at Palazzo Grassi in Venice, he created a series of 22 works dedicated to the lagoon city. He manipulated the paint with his fingers and various instruments to make furrows, sometimes including scattered fragments of Murano glass. Fontana was subsequently invited by Michel Tapié to exhibit the works at the Martha Jackson Gallery in New York. As a consequence of his first visit to New York in 1961, he created a series of metal works, done between 1961 and 1965. The works consisted of large sheets of shiny and scratched copper, pierced and gouged, cut through by dramatic vertical gestures that recall the force of New York construction and the metal and glass of the buildings.

Among Fontana's last works are a series of Teatrini (‘little theatres’), in which he returned to an essentially flat idiom by using backcloths enclosed within wings resembling a frame; the reference to theatre emphasizes the act of looking, while in the foreground a series of irregular spheres or oscillating, wavy silhouettes creates a lively shadow play. Another work from that time, Trinità (Trinity) (1966), consists of three large white canvases punctuated by lines of holes, embraced in a theatrical setting made from ultramarine plastic sheets vaguely resembling wings.

In the last years of his career, Fontana became increasingly interested in the staging of his work in the many exhibitions that honored him worldwide, as well as in the idea of purity achieved in his last white canvases. These concerns were prominent at the 1966 Venice Biennale, for which he designed the environment for his work. At Documenta IV in Kassel in 1968, he positioned a large, plaster slash as the centre of a totally white labyrinth, including ceiling and floor (Ambiente spaziale bianco).

Shortly before his death he was present at the "Destruction Art, Destroy to Create" demonstration at the Finch College Museum of New York. Then he left his home in Milano and went to Comabbio (in the province of Varese, Italy), his family's hometown, where he died in 1968.

Fontana created a prolific amount of graphic work with abstract motifs as well as figures, little-known in the art world, at the same time as he was producing his abstract perforated works. He was also the sculptor of the bust of Ovidio Lagos, founder of the La Capital newspaper, in Carrara marble.

== Exhibitions ==
Fontana had his first solo exhibition at Galleria del Milione, Milan, in 1931. In 1961, Michel Tapié organized his first show in the U.S., an exhibition of the Venice series, at the Martha Jackson Gallery, New York. His first solo exhibition at an American museum was held at the Walker Art Center, Minneapolis, in 1966. He participated in the Bienal de São Paulo and in numerous exhibitions around the world. Among others, major retrospectives have been organized by the Peggy Guggenheim Collection, Venice (2006), Hayward Gallery, London (1999), Fondazione Lucio Fontana (1999), and the Centre Pompidou (1987; traveled to La Fundación 'la Caixa' Barcelona; Stedelijk Museum Amsterdam; Whitechapel Gallery, London). Since 1930 Fontana's work had been exhibited regularly at the Venice Biennale, and he represented Argentina various times; he was awarded the Grand Prize for Painting at the Venice Biennale of 1966. In 2014, the Musée d'Art moderne de Paris dedicated a retrospective to the artist. Tornabuoni Art held a parallel show in its Avenue Matignon, Paris, gallery space. The first major American retrospective since the artist's death came in 2019 at the Met Breuer.

From 23 January − 14 April 2019, the Metropolitan Museum of Art and Met Breuer displayed Lucio Fontana: On the Threshold displaying his both paintings and sculptures. It was then exhibited from 17 May 2019 – 29 September 2019 at the Guggenheim Bilbao, exhibiting Lucio Fontana: On the Threshold. The exhibition catalog was edited by Iria Candela. ISBN 978-1-588-39682-2

The most recent solo exhibition of Fontan's work was at the Peggy Guggenheim Museum in Venice. A catalogue was produced for this show.

== Collections ==
Fontana's works can be found in the permanent collections of more than one hundred museums around the world. In particular, examples from the Pietre series are housed in the Stedelijk Museum, Amsterdam, the Centre Pompidou, Paris, the Museum of Modern Art in New York, the Galleria Nazionale d'Arte Moderna in Rome, the Museum of Contemporary Art Villa Croce in Genoa and the van Abbemuseum, Eindhoven. Fontana's jewellery is included in the permanent collection of the Museum of Fine Arts, Boston.

== Art market ==
Italian scholar Enrico Crispolti edited a two-volume catalogue raisonné of Fontana's paintings, sculptures and environments in 2006. In 2013, Luca Massimo Barbero, Nina Ardemagni Laurini and Silvia Ardemagni published a three-volume catalogue raisonné of Fontana's works on paper, including more than 5,500 works in chronological order.

A rare, large crimson work with a single slash, which Fontana dedicated to his wife and which has always been known as the Teresita, fetched £6.7 million ($11.6 million) at Christie's London in 2008, then an auction record for the artist. Fontana's Concetto Spaziale, Attese (1965), from the collection of Anna-Stina Malmborg Hoglund and Gunnar Hoglund, set a new record for a slash painting at £8.4 million at Sotheby's London in 2015. Even more popular are Fontana's oval canvases. Sotheby's sold a work titled Concetto spaziale, la fine di dio (1963) for £10.32 million in 2008. Part of Fontana's Venice circle, Festival on the Grand Canal was sold at Christie's in New York for $7 million in 2008.

In November 2015, Concetto spaziale, la fine di dio (1964), was sold by Christie's for $29 million, setting an auction record for the artist's work.
