= Joseph Pace (artist) =

Italian painter and sculptor (born 1959)

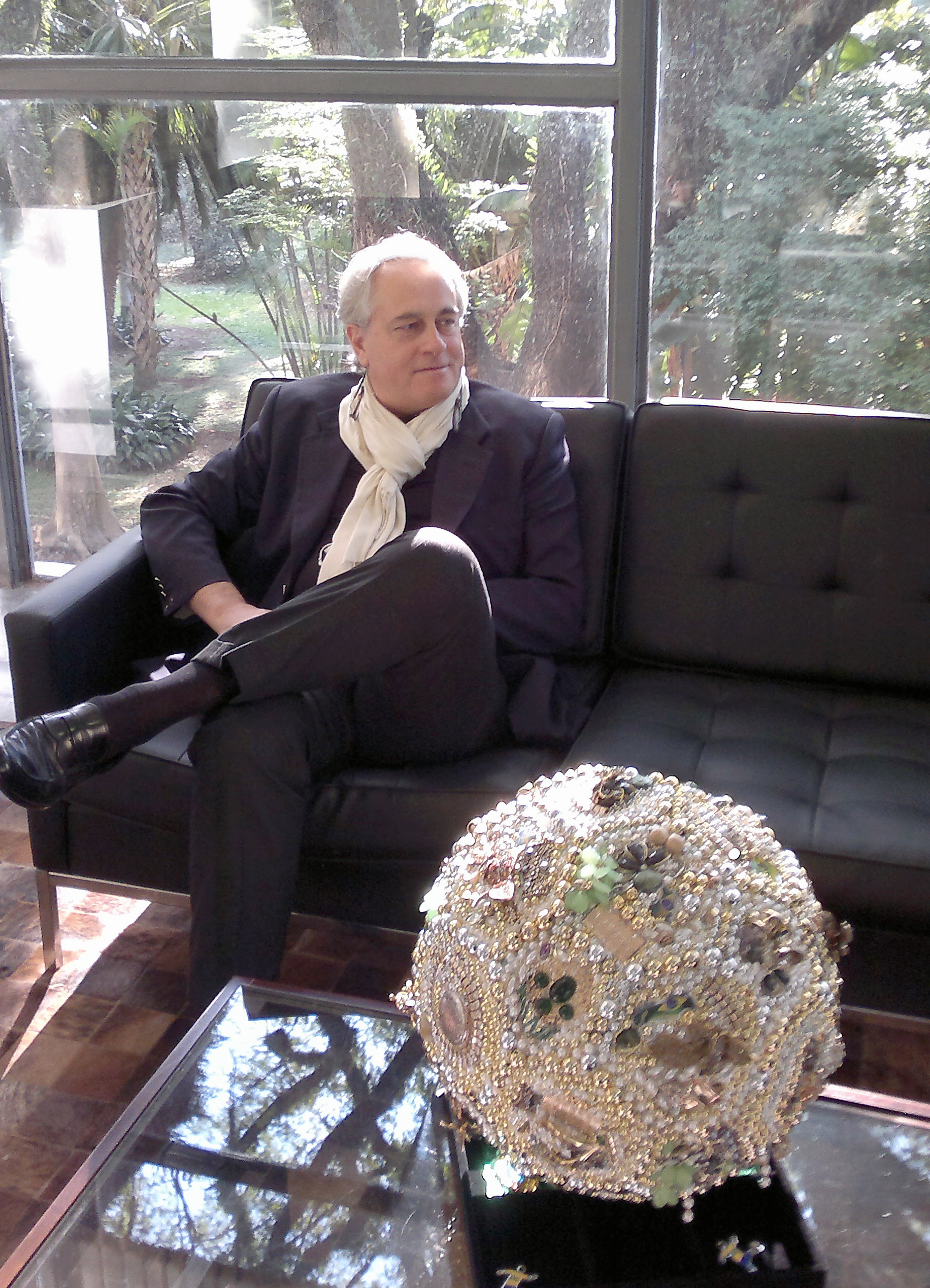
- Born: 18 November 1959 (age 66); Morbegno (Lombardy); Italy
- Known for: Painting, sculpture, assemblage, printmaking
- Movement: Contemporary art

Joseph Pace (born 18 November 1959) is an Italian painter and sculptor.

== Early life and education ==
Joseph Pace was born in Morbegno (Lombardy) and raised in Congo-Kinshasa (Africa). Grandson of Camillo Pace, he was introduced to the visual arts by his uncle Antonio Cardile. He also has followed legal, literary, social and psychoanalytical studies at the Paris-Sorbonne University, at the Sapienza University of Rome and at the Roma Tre University.

== Work ==
In the 1980s Pace worked in Rome and Paris where, in the mid-1980s, he founded "Le Filtranisme" a neo-existencialist philosophical and artistic current witch has an optic close to Renaissance and an anthropocosmic vision.

Inspired by sources as diverse as fashion, history, electronic music and decorative arts, Pace uses different techniques (such as painting, assemblage, sculpture, electronic engravings, photography) influenced by the iconography of mass society, philosophy and psychoanalysis.

Also assembling objects such as costume jewellery or recycled materials such as wood, metals or frosted glass of refrigerators shelves, Pace above all uses painting as his favorite medium.

During the 1980s Parisian period, he befriends the Brazilian artist Sergio Valle Duarte. and the bilingual writer Albert Russo. In the summer of 1990 meaningful is the encounter between the sociologist Kurt Heinrich Wolff about the epistemological "surrender-and-catch" concepts that changed the Pace work from figurative painting to the abstract expressionism. His work gives an artistic and intellectual pathway with which Pace reinterprets many psychic realities.

After the figurative period (1977–1990), the abstract period (1990–) is first characterized by the "Periodo dei Legni" (Woods's period 1990–1996) and the "Factor C" studies (1997) and subsequently by the still in progress series, "IDM" (Unshakableness of the Memory, 2000–) and "ATONS" (dedicated to the techno and electronic music, 2005–). Pace is also working on "ENGRAVING" (printmakings elaborate with computer) and "MIDAS", the sculptures/assemblages of jewellery.

From 1996 to 2008, Pace worked as a university teaching assistant of Sociology of knowledge and Art, and History of sociology at the Faculty of Sociology of the Sapienza University of Rome.

== Exhibitions (selection) ==
His solo shows includes the Museum of Art of the Parliament of São Paulo (2010), CRC in São Paulo (2010), Theatro Municipal of Jaguariúna (2011), Forte Sangallo in Nettuno (2011), Museum Boncompagni Ludovisi, National Gallery of Modern and Contemporary Art of Rome (2014), Museum Venanzo Crocetti in Rome (2015), Câmara Municipal de Itapevi (2018), Pantheon, Rome, Basilica of Santa Maria ad Martyres, Polo Museale del Lazio (2018), Biblioteca Storica Nazionale dell'Agricoltura, Ministry of Agricultural, Food and Forestry Policies, Rome (2019), Câmara Municipal de Itapevi (2020), CRC in São Paulo (2020), Pantheon, Basilica of Santa Maria ad Martyres, Direzione Musei Statali di Roma, Ministry of Culture, Rome (2021) - Travelling exhibition, Basilica of St. Lawrence in Lucina, Rome (2021), Museo Archeologico Nazionale di Civitavecchia, Polo Museale del Lazio, Ministry of culture (2022), Boncompagni Ludovisi Decorative Art Museum, Ministry of Culture, Direzione dei Musei Statali della Città di Roma (2022).

His group exhibitions includes the Diocesan Museum of Amalfi (2012), Forte Sangallo in Nettuno (2012), Italian Embassy in Brasília (2013), Museum Venanzo Crocetti in Rome (2014), Museum Afro Brasil in São Paulo (2014), Florence Biennale (2015), Castello Normanno-Svevo in Bari, Polo Museale della Puglia, Ministry of Cultural Heritage (2019), Copertino Castle, Lecce, Polo Museale della Puglia, Ministry of Cultural Heritage (2019–2020), Boncompagni Ludovisi Decorative Art Museum, Ministry of Culture, Direzione dei Musei Statali della Città di Roma (2021), Basilica of St. Lawrence in Lucina (2022).
