= Angelo Savelli =

Italian painter (1911–1995)

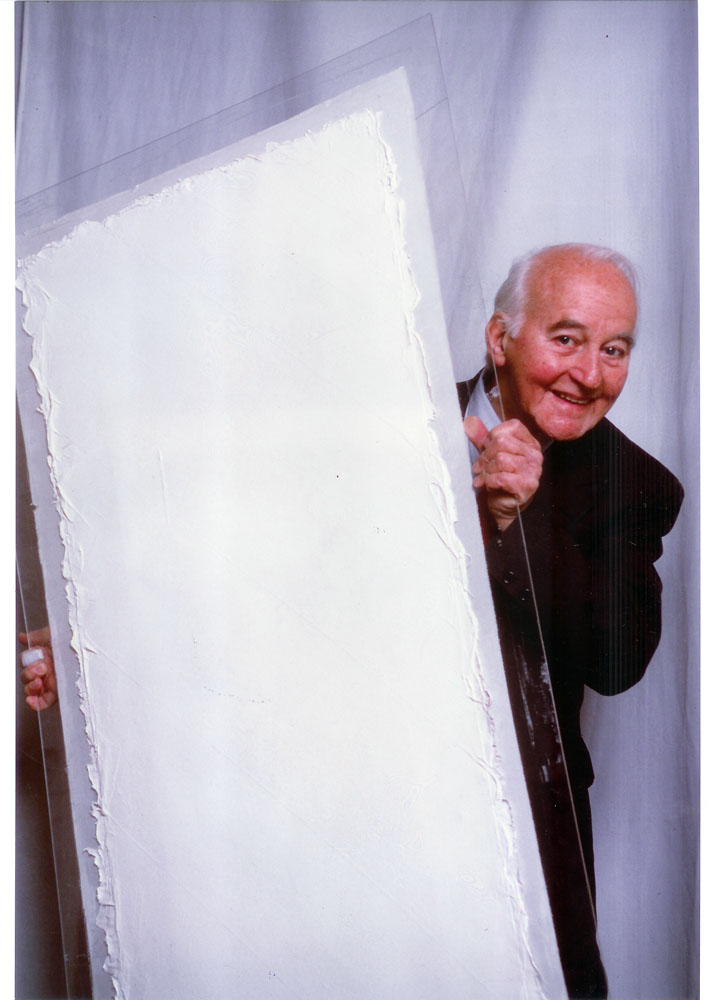
- Savelli in 1995
- Born: 30 October 1911; Pizzo, Calabria, Italy
- Died: 28 April 1995 (aged 83); Boldeniga, Italy
- Occupation: Painter
- Website: angelosavelli.com

Angelo Savelli (30 October 1911 – 28 April 1995) was an Italian painter. His work was part of the painting event in the art competition at the 1948 Summer Olympics.

Savelli has work in the Whitney Museum and the Smithsonian American Art Museum.

== Biography ==
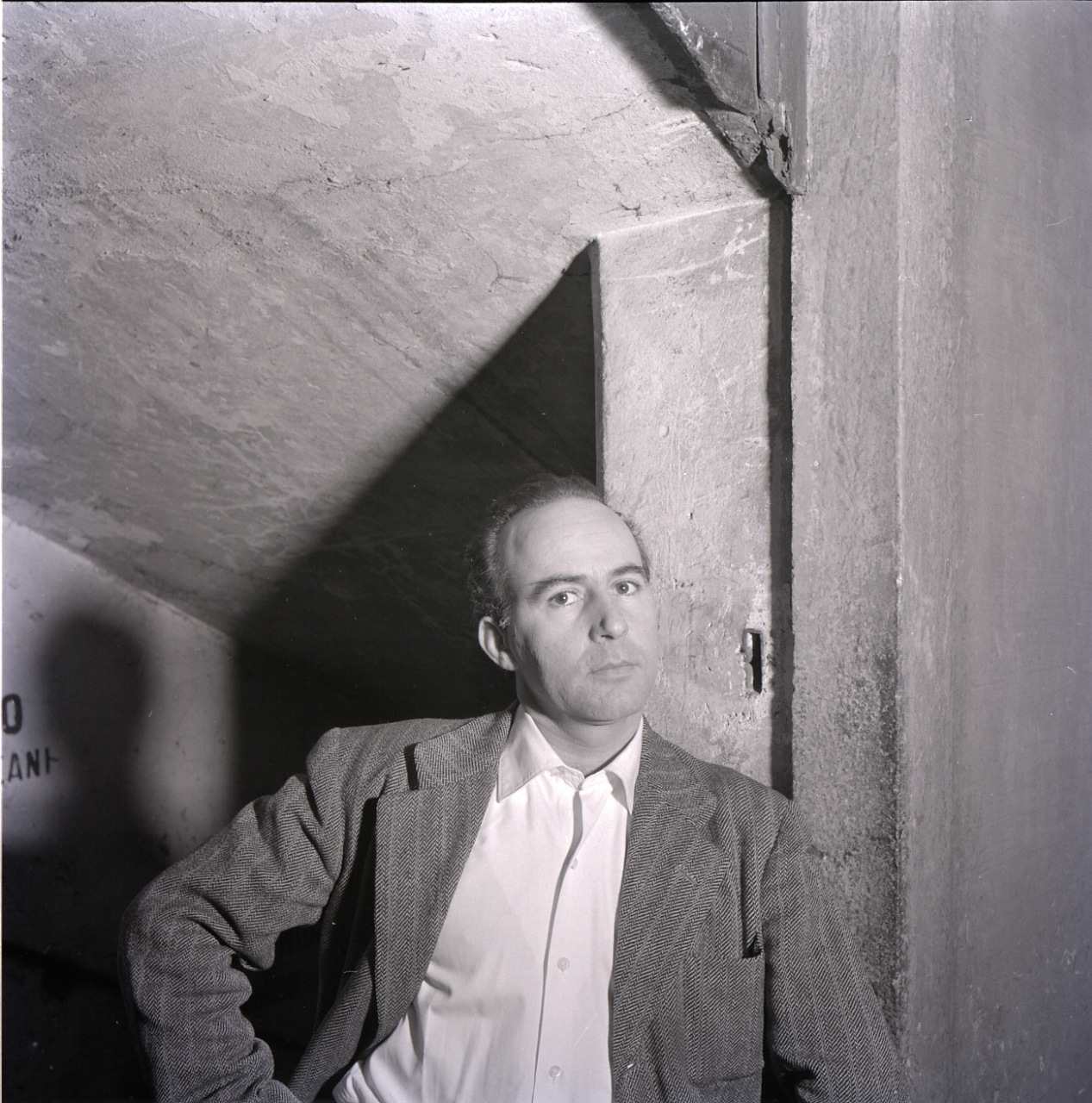
Angelo Savelli fotografato nel suo studio da Paolo Monti

=== Education and Artistic Career ===
Angelo Savelli was born on 30 October 1911, in Pizzo (Vibo Valentia). He approached art at a young age, inspired by his self-taught painter uncle, Alfonso Barone. In 1930, after attending classical studies at the Filangieri High School in Vibo Valentia, Calabria, his father Giorgio, a pharmacist, encouraged him to further develop his artistic talent. Savelli moved to Rome, where he attended art school and later the Academy of Fine Arts. In 1935, he received the "Mattia Preti" prize and subsequently the "Balestra" prize in a competition organized by the Academy of San Luca in Rome. In 1936, he graduated from the Academy of Fine Arts, studying under Ferruccio Ferrazzi. He frescoed the chapel of Villa Boimond in Sora (Frosinone) and was awarded at the Regional Exhibition of Calabria. In 1937, he left for military service.

In 1940, he began teaching at the Academy of Fine Arts in Rome, which did not prevent him from maintaining an active artistic career. He established himself at Via Margutta 49, a street known for its high concentration of artists, including Guttuso, Franchina, Jarema, Fazzini, Severini, and others. He was awarded at the Regional Exhibition of Lazio.

In 1941, he received one of the four supplementary prizes of 2,500 lire at the III Premio Bergamo, and the following year, a 5,000-lire prize at the IV Premio Bergamo. He was recalled to military service in 1943. After the war, he returned to Rome and joined the Futurist circle. He also became part of the Art Club, an Independent International Art Association that included Jarema, Severini, Fazzini, Guzzi, Montanarini, and Tamburi, and later Dorazio, Mafai, Corpora, Perilli, Consagra, and Turcato. During this period, he met Alberto Burri.

=== First Appearances of White ===
In 1946–1947, his first works incorporating white appeared. In several crucifixions, Christ and Magdalene were painted in white. This was a period when Savelli felt a need for new emotions. The Roman School had become limiting for him; instead, Futurism and Prampolini's experiments encouraged him to explore new techniques.

In 1947, he spent several months in Venice, where he began practicing yoga and meditation. He received the "Colli Euganei" prize in Abano.

=== The Change ===
In 1948, he won a one-month scholarship to Paris, which he extended to a year. The Parisian experience was a revelation. He would later say, "I realized that I had to free myself from my divine Italian tradition." During this time, he produced many ink and watercolor drawings.

After the expressionism of his Roman years, he returned from Paris in 1949 with a vision of modern art that none of his friends in Italy could understand. In Rome, he met Theodoros Stamos.

In 1950, with two works titled Beyond the Restless, he began his first abstract works and participated in the XXV Venice Biennale.

=== New York City ===
In 1953, he married journalist Elisabeth Fischer and moved to New York. He joined the 10th Street Art Club and met artists from the New York School, including Philip Pavia and Jack Tworkov, who offered him his studio at 10th Street and 4th Avenue.

In 1954, he created Oval Skin. The following year, he began a series of screen prints and collages at Chelsea Workshop.

In 1956, he created White on White, a monochrome screen print, marking his first entirely white painting.

In 1957, he had a solo exhibition at the D'Amecourt Gallery in Washington.

In 1958, he exhibited at the Leo Castelli Gallery on 77th Street and the Galleria del Cavallino in Venice. The same year, he was awarded at the "Battistoni" international industrial design competition.

In 1959, he was appointed director of the "La Guardia Memorial House" art school.

=== White as the sole colour ===
In 1959, he further explored white through embossed prints, establishing it as his only color. He developed a monochromatic art style, producing works with extreme minimalism and formal purity.

In 1960, he was invited to teach at the American Art Workshop in Positano (Naples) and to participate in a printing techniques seminar in Milan.

In 1962, the University of Pennsylvania invited him to reorganize the Department of Fine Arts, in collaboration with Piero Dorazio, course director. Savelli accepted and moved to Pennsylvania, where he lived in Springtown for ten years without abandoning his New York studio.

He won the Lissone Prize in 1961.

In 1962, he created his first works with rope and produced eleven embossed lithographs, white on white, introduced by Giulio Carlo Argan (Grattacielo, Milan, 1962).

Ten Poems by Ten American Poets, with lithographs by Savelli, was published (Romero, Rome, 1963).

In 1964, he received the Grand Prix for Graphics at the XXXIII Venice Biennale for twenty-seven embossed white-on-white works.

Between 1965 and 1970, he created the first meditation room, named Paradise, in his studio at 186 Bowery Street, New York.

In 1966, he taught at Columbia University in New York.

Between 1969 and 1970, he completed Paradise II at the Corcoran Gallery of Art, Washington, and Dante's Inferno at the Peale Galleries of Pennsylvania, at the Academy of Fine Arts in Philadelphia.

From 1970 to 1973, he was a Guest Artist at the University of WI-STOUT in Wisconsin.

In 1971, he created Illumine One, exhibited in 1972 at a solo exhibition at the Everson Museum in Syracuse, New York; the catalog was introduced by Louis Kahn.

In 1973, his sculpture Empedocles was installed at the Lincoln Center in Syracuse.

In 1974, he taught at Cornell University in Ithaca, New York.

In 1975, he taught for two years as a Visiting Artist at Pennsylvania State University, where he created Wall to Wall, exhibited in a show at the same university. That same year, he was also invited to teach at the Academy of Fine Arts in Philadelphia.

In 1976, he produced his first unframed canvases, directly applied to the wall, and painted the On the Quantity of the Surface series.

In 1977, he made a series of forty white-on-white prints and accepted a position as visiting professor at the University of Texas, Arlington.

In 1978, he created the installation Tree with 84 Tree Trunks, exhibited at the Max Hutchinson Gallery in New York.

In 1980, he received the Guggenheim Fellowship from the Guggenheim Museum in New York, which allowed him to live in Europe and hold solo exhibitions in Milan, Zurich, and Rome.

In 1981, he created the sculpture Aglaophon, installed at the Aubodon Art Center in New York.

=== The Death of His Wife Betty and a Period of Solitude ===
In 1982, his wife Elisabeth Fischer died, marking the beginning of a long period of solitude for him. The municipality of Pizzo Calabro awarded him a gold medal for artistic merit. Angelo Savelli, Opera grafica 1932–1981 by Giuseppe Appella was published by Scheiwiller.

In 1983, he was awarded by the American Academy of Arts and Letters.

In 1984, the PAC – Civic Pavilion of Contemporary Art in Milan held a solo exhibition coordinated by Luigi Sansone.

In 1984, he created a remarkable piece dedicated to his wife, Glory of a Broken Wing, to Elisabeth Fischer, extending 1,650 cm in length.

In 1986, Libro Bianco, with engravings by Savelli and poems by Lucini, was published by Scheiwiller.

In 1988, he moved to his final studio at 257 Water Street, Pier 17, New York. The same year, Rai Corporation in New York made a documentary on his life, directed by Luigi Ballerini.

=== Encounters ===
In 1989, at Rai Corporation in New York, he met Susanna Argenterio, whom he loved as a daughter.

In 1991, the Angelo Savelli Center for Contemporary Art opened in Lamezia Terme, Calabria.

In 1993, he began creating a room in the L'Atelier sul Mare hotel in Castel di Tusa, Sicily, which he could not complete.

In 1994, Patrizio Bertelli and his wife Miuccia Prada visited his studio in New York and fell in love with his work, initiating a collaboration with the Prada Foundation.

=== Return to Italy ===
On 30 November 1994, the Venice Biennale invited Savelli to participate with a personal room in the Italian section of the 46th Biennale.

On 14 February 1995, the "Luigi Pecci" Museum of Contemporary Art in Prato invited Savelli to create a retrospective exhibition scheduled from June to September of that year.

On 10 March 1995, Savelli left New York and arrived in Milan to personally oversee the realization of both exhibitions.

=== Final Days ===
On 17 April 1995, he felt unwell and was admitted to San Orsola Hospital in Brescia by the Argenterio family, who were hosting him.

Savelli died at the Boldeniga Castle in Dello on 27 April 1995, at the age of eighty-three.

== Exhibitions and prizes ==
1935

- Mostra Regionale Calabrese, Catanzaro (collective).
- He wins the "Mattia Preti" and the "Balestra" prize.

1936

- He paints in fresco the chapel of Villa Boimond in Sora.
- Mostra Missionaria Cattolica, Vatican (collective).
- He wins the prize by the Esposizione Regionale Calabrese.

1940

- He wins the prize by the Mostra Regionale del Lazio.

1941

- He wins the prize by the Terzo Premio Bergamo (exhibition of: Nel mio studio, Fine di una speranza, I fiori di Annabella, Sian Lee)
- Premio Bergamo, Bergamo (collective)
- Palazzo dell'Arte, Milan (collective)
- Galleria in Roma,(first personal exhibition)

1943

- IV Quadriennale di Roma, Rome (collective)
- Galleria il Babbuino, Rome (collective)
- Galleria il Ritrovo, Rome (personal)
- Galleria San Marco, Rome (personal)

1945

- Art Club, Il Cairo (collective)
- Art Club, Alexandria, Egypt (collective).
- Art Club, Buenos Aires (collective)
- Galleria il Fiore, Florence (collective)
- Biennale di Reggio Calabria, Reggio Calabria (collective)
- Galleria agli Schiavi, Rome (collective)
- Illustrazione del Libro Francese, Rome, Lion, Paris (collective)
- Galleria San Marco (exhibition of the Art Club), Rome (personal)
- Galleria il Ritrovo, Rome (personal).

1946

- Gruppo Romano, Washington D.C, New York (collective).
- Galleria Cronache, Bologna (personal).
- Galleria Oblù (exhibition of the Art Club)
- Capri (personal)

1947

- He wins the "Colli Euganei" prize, Abano
- Pittura Italiana Moderna, la Shaux de Fonds, Lugano (collective)
- Mostra d'Arte Italiana, Kunsthalle, Berne (collective)
- Galleria 2A+C, Palermo (collective)
- 53th Mostra dell'Art Club, Rome (collective)
- Galleria del Naviglio, Milan (personal)
- Galleria Sandri, Venice (personal)
- Galleria d'Arte Michelazzi, Trieste (personal)
- Galleria dell'Obelisco, Rome (personal)
- Galleria del Secolo, Rome (personal)

1948

- Art club, Johannesburg, Città del Capo, Pretoria (collective)

1949

- Mostra d'Arte Italiana, Vienna, Salisburgo (collective)
- Castello Murat, Pizzo Calabro (Catanzaro), (personal)

1950

- XXV Biennale di Venezia, Venice (exhibition of: Scoperta inquietante, Attualità vivente, Gli elementi provocati) (collective)
- Biennale di Reggio Calabria, Reggio Calabria (collective)
- Centre Art Italienne, Paris (collective)
- Bar Strega di Via Veneto, Rome (collective)

1951

- Art Club, Rome, Stockholm, Helsinki, Goteborg, Oslo, Copenhagen (collective)
- Il Mostra d'Arte, Alatri (collective)
- Premio Roma, Rome (collective)
- Arte astratta e concreta in Italia, (organized by the Art Club), Galleria Nazionale d'Arte Moderna, Rome (collective)
- Galleria San Marco, Rome (personal)

1952

- VI Mostra Annuale dell'Art Club, Galleria Nazionale d'Arte Moderna, Rome (exhibition of: Oltre l'inquieto, città distrutta, Messaggio)
- XXVI Biennale di Venezia, Venice (exhibition of: Nello Spazio, Travolgente, Il sole penetra dentro la terra, Noi alla conquista dello spazio, Realtà dinamica dello Spazio) (collective)
- Galleria il Camino, Rome (collective)
- Bottega d'Arte, Terni (collective)
- III Mostra Marsicana di Arti Figurative (collective)
- Gallerie du centre d'Art Italien, Paris (personal)

1953

- VII Mostra annuale dell'Art Club, Galleria Nazionale d'arte Moderna, Rome (exhibition of: Inquietante, Inquieto, Oltre l'Inquieto) (collective).
- Galleria Chiuriazzi, Rome (collective).

1954

- XXVII Biennale di Venezia, Venice (exhibition of: Apparizioni all'Alba, Natura ribelle, Il polline sui fiori, Turbolenza benefica della natura, Flusso vitale) (collective)
- Galleria Numero, Florence (personal)
- Galleria del Naviglio, Milan (personal)
- Palazzo della Prefettura, Catanzaro (personal)

1956

- International Collage, Rose Friend, New York (collective)
- Graphics Wardsworth Atheneum, Hartford, Connecticut (personal)
- D'Amercourt Gallery, Washington D.C. (personal)

1957

- Leo Castelli Gallery, New York (collective)
- Piondexter Gallery, New York (collective)
- Brooklyn Museum, New York (collective)
- Collage in America (collective)
- American Painting, itinerant exhibition in Canada (collective)
- Graphic Outlook, The Contemporaries Gallery, New York (collective)
- La Guardia Memorial House, New York (collective)

1955

- Annual Exhibit, Stable Gallery, New York (collective)
- The contemporaries Gallery, Washington D.C. (personal)

1958

- New tendencies in Italian Art, Rome, New York (collective).
- Leo Castelli Gallery, New York (personal)
- Galleria del Cavallino, Venice (personal)

1959

- 17th National Exhibition of Prints, library of congress, Washington D.C. (collective)
- Pratt- Contemporaries Workshop, River Side Museum, New York (collective)
- College Area Gallery New York (collective)
- VII Quadriennale d'Arte di Roma, Rome (collective)
- Modern Drawings – European and American, Bertha Schaefer Gallery, New York (collective)
- Galleria d'Arte Selecta, Roma (personal)
- Ellison Gallery, Fort Worth, Texas (personal)
- HCE Gallery, Provincetown (personal)
- Bertha Schaefer Gallery, New York (personal)

1960

- 8th Annual Exhibition, Art Workshop, Positano (collective)
- 12th National Print Exhibition, Brooklyn Museum, New York (collective)
- Tweed Museum of Art, Duluth, Minnesota (personal)

1961

- He wins the "Lissone" prize
- IV Biennale del Mediterraneo (organized by Biennale di Venezia), Cairo (collective)
- Galleria George Lester, Rome (collective)
- Galleria del Grattacielo, Legnano (personal)
- Galleria del Naviglio, Milan (personal)
- Galleria Art Workshop, Positano (personal)

1962

- Galleria del Grattacielo, Milan (personal)
- Brooklyn Museum, New York (collective)
- Premio Marzotto, Roma (collective)
- Galerie XX Siecle, Paris (collective)
- Valdagno (collective)
- Baden-Baden (collective)
- Pittori Italiani residenti all'estero. Galleria Stendhal, Milan (collective)
- Premio Sicilia Industria, Palermo (collective)
- Peter Deitsch Gallery, New York (personal)
- Galleria Quadrante, Florence (personal)

1963

- Whitechapel Gallery, London (collective)
- Musèe des Artes Decoratifs, Paris (collective)
- University of Pennsylvania, Philadelphia (collective)
- 19th National Exhibition of Prints, Library of congress, Washington D.C. (collective)
- Biennale Internazionale della Grafica, Ljubljana (collective)
- Joseph Grippi Gallery, New York (collective)
- D'Arci Gallery, New York (personal)
- Art Alliance, Philadelphia (personal)

1964

- He wins the "Gran Premio per la Grafica" by the XXXII Biennale di Venezia
- Eastern Illinois University, Charleston (collective)
- The Classic Spirit in 20th Century Art, Sydney Janis Gallery, New York (collective)
- Graphic Arts U.S.A., Moscow, Erevan, Leningrad (collective)
- 14th National Print Exhibition, Brooklyn Museum, New York.
- 4th International Biennal Exhibition of Prints, Tokyo (collective)
- XXXII Biennale di Venezia, Venice (personal)
- Eastern Illinois University, Charleston (personal)

1965

- Convergenze, Galleria dell'Arte della Casa do Brasil, Rome (collective)
- Galleria Ferrari, Verona (collective)
- Graphic Arts U.S.A., Costanza Ploesti, Bucarest, Prague, Cracow, Warsaw, Szczecin, Ljubljana, Belgrade (collective)
- Prints, State University College, Potsdam, New York State (collective)
- IX Quadriennale d'Arte di Roma, Rome (collective)

1966

- Galleria dell'Obelisco, Rome (collective)
- 20th National Exhibition of Prints, Library of Congress, Washington D.C. (collective)
- 15th National Prints Exhibition, Brooklyn Museum of American Art, New York (collective)
- Contemporary painter and sculptor as printmakers, Museum of Modern Art, New York (collective)
- 47th Annual Exhibition of the Society of American Graphic Artists, Pepsi Cola Gallery, New York (collective)
- Graphics '67: Italy, University of Kentucky Art Gallery, Lexington, Kentucky (collective)
- Contemporary Prints and Drawings, Chicago, Illinois (personal)

1967

- Stampe di due mondi, Tyler School of Arts, Rome (collective)
- Whitney museum of American Art, New York (collective)
- Vancouver Print International, The Vancouver Art Gallery, Vancouver, Canada (collective)

1968

- Phoenix Art Museum, Maremont Collection, Phoenix, Arizona (collective)
- Pennsylvania Academy of Fine Arts, Philadelphia (collective)
- Galerie Rive Gauche, Roma (collective)
- American Prints Today, Museum of Art Muson Williams, Proctor Institute, Utica, New York (collective)

1969-1970

- Peale Galleries of Pennsylvania Academy of Arts, Philadelphia (personal)
- Corcoran Gallery of Art, Washington D.C.(personal)
- 31st Biennial Exhibition of Contemporary American Painting, The Corcoran Gallery of Art, Washington D.C. (collective)
- Two decades of American Prints 1947–1968, The Brooklyn Museum, New York (collective)
- Salon de Mai, Paris (collective)
- Henry Gallery, Washington D.C. (personal)
- Savelli-Inner Space, The Concoran Gallery of Art, Washington D.C. (personal)

1971

- Library of Congress, Washington D.C. (collective)
- White of White, Museum of Contemporary Art Chicago (collective)

1972

- Gallery Rive Gauche, Rome (collective)
- Enviro-Vision, New York State Fair (collective)
- Everson museum of Art, Syracuse, New York State (personal)

1973

- Everson Museum of Art, Syracuse, New York State (collective)
- Allentown Museum, Allentown, Pennsylvania (collective)
- University of Wisconsin, Art Center Gallery, Menomonie, Wisconsin (collective)
- South Art Gallery, Menomonie, Wisconsin (personal)

1974

- Herbert F.Johnson Museum, Ithaca, New York State (collective)
- Tweed Museum of Art, University of Minnesota, Duluth (personal)

1975

- Zoller Gallery, Pennsylvania State University

1976

- Sculptor's Drawings, Fine Arts Building, New York (collective)
- Zoller Gallery, Pennsylvania State University (personal)

1977

- Collection in progress, Moore College of Art Gallery (collective)

1978

- Weintraud Gallery (collective)
- Project Spaces, Muhlenberg College Center for the Arts, Allentown, Pennsylvania (collective)
- Max Hutchinson Gallery, New York (personal)
- Sculpture Now Inc., New York (personal)
- Parson-Dreyfuss, New York (personal)

1979-1980

- He receives the "Guggenheim Fellowship" from the Guggenheim Museum of New York (collective)
- University of Saint Thomas, Houston, Texas (collective)
- Allenitown Museum, Allentown, Pennsylvania (collective)
- R.H. Osterom Gallery, New York (collective)
- Disegni del XX Secolo, Istituto Nazionale per la Grafica, Rome (collective)

1981

- American Academy and Institute of Arts and Letters, New York (collective)
- Art Gallery Aubudon Terrace, New York (collective)
- Galleria Lorenzelli, Milan (personal)
- Gimpel-Hannover e Emmerich Gallery, Zurich (personal)
- L'Arco Studio Internazionale d'Arte Grafica, Rome (personal)
- Galleria Editalia, Rome (personal)

1982

- The commune of Pizzo Calabro gives him a golden medal for his artistic merits.

1983

- He is awarded by the American Academy of Arts and Letters.

1984

- Civico d'Arte Contemporanea, Milan (personal)

1985

- Guttuso a Genova nel nome della Ragione, Ville Croce, Genoa (collective)

1986

- The commune of Pizzo Calabro gives him a golden medal for his artistic merits.
- New Liberty Monuments, snug Harbor Cultural Center, State Island, New York (collective)
- Structured Art and Architecture, Branchville Soho Gallery, Ridgefield, Connecticut (collective)
- Roma 1934, Galleria Civica di Modena e Pallazzo Braschi di Roma (collective)

1987

- La città della Magna Grecia, Rossano (collective)
- IV Rassegna della Stampa d'Arte Leonardo Castellani, Urbino (collective)
- XXX Biennale Nazionale d'Arte Città di Milano, Palazzo della Permanente, Milan (collective)
- Le Città della Magna Grecia, Rossano (collective)
- "Amore d'autore", D'Ars Studio, Milan (collective)
- Studio Renato Brazzani, Turin (personal)
- Studio D'Ars, Milan (personal)

1988

- Le muse irrequiete di Leonardo Sinisgalli, Palazzo Ricci, Macerata (collective)
- Galleria il Salotto, Como (personal)
- Wichita art Museum, Wichita, Kansas (personal)
- Balestrini, Centro Cultura e Arte Contemporanea, Albisola Mare (personal)

1989

- Riceve una targa d'argento per i meriti artistici al Premio di Pittura Cassano Sibari, Cassano Ionio
- Pro Loco, Vibo Valentia (personal)

1990

- La Madonna nell'Arte Italiana del Novecento, Castrovillari, Chiesa di San Giuliano (collective)
- Arte per un territorio, Pernocari (collective)
- Allentown Art Museum, Pennsylvania (personal)
- Casa del Mantegna, Mantua (personal)

1991

- Nel più ampio cerchio, Centro Museo Grafico, Taverna (collective)
- Biennale d'Arte Calabrese, Monterosso (collective)
- Questa Calabria è Arte, Civico Museo, nicotera (collective)
- Art Cologne, Galleria d'Arte Niccoli, Colonia (collective)
- La più bella Galleria d'Italia, Fortezza da Basso, Florence (collective)
- Galleria d'Arte Niccoli, Parma (personal)
- Galleria Elleni, Bergamo (personal)

1992-1993

- Kodama Gallery, Osaka (personal)
- Elevazioni, Centro Angelo Savelli, Lamezia Terme (personal)

1994

- Galleria d'Arte Prati, Palermo (personal)
- Savelli, Friscia, Centro Angelo Savelli, Lamezia Terme

== Posthumous exhibitions ==
- 1995 Savelli prima del bianco, Galleria EdiEuropa-Qui Arte contemporanea, Rome (personal)
- 1996 Omaggio ad Angelo Savelli, 27 aprile 1996, Castello di Boldeniga, Dello
- 2005 Le dinamiche del gesto, Balestrini Centro Cultura Arte Contemporanea, Albissola Marina (SV), (collective)
- 2006 Angelo Savelli e Roma, Museo Pericle Fazzini – Palazzo del Capitano del Perdono, Assisi, (personal)
- 2007 Angelo Savelli – La poetica del bianco, Solaria Arte, Piacenza, (personale)
- 2008 Pittura italiana aniconica (1968-2007) - Percorsi tra arte e critica in Italia, Casa del Mantegna, Mantua (collective)
- 2012 Angelo Savelli. Il maestro del bianco, Museo delle arti di Catanzaro (MARCA) - Catanzaro (personal)
- 2016 Angelo Savelli - Basically White, M&L Fine Art - London (personal)
- 2021 Angelo Savelli - L'artista del bianco, Fondazione Biscozzi Rimbaud, Lecce, retrospective curated by Paolo Bolpagni).
- 2023 "Greetings" - Galerie Hussenot, Paris (collective)
- 2024 "Carte" - Paula Seegy Gallery, Milano (collective)

== Angelo Savelli in museums ==
- Fondazione Biscozzi Rimbaud, Lecce
- MARCA (Museo delle arti di Catanzaro), Catanzaro
- Fondazione Prada, Milan
- Galleria Nazionale d'Arte Moderna di Roma
- GAM, Galleria Civica d'Arte Moderna e Contemporanea, Turin
- Casa Museo Remo Brindisi - Arte e Design del Novecento, Lido di Spina, Comacchio, Ferrara
- MOMA, Museum of Modern Art, New York
- Philadelphia Museum of Art, Philadelphia
- Everson Museum of Art, Syracuse, New York
- Norfolk Museum of Art and Sciences- Chrysler Museum, Norfolk, Virginia
- National Gallery of Art, Rosenwald Collection, Washington
- Kalamazoo Institute of Art, Kalamazoo, Michigan
- Wichita Art Museum, Wichita, Kansas
- Cincinnati Art Museum, Cincinnati
- The Brooklyn Art Museum, New York
- Chase Manhattan Bank Collection, New York
- New York Public Library: The Art & Architecture Collection, New York
- National Collection of Fine Arts, Smithsonian Institution, Washington D.C.
- Victoria and Albert Museum, London
- Stedelijk Museum, Amsterdam

== Bibliography ==
- Marnicola G., Savelli, Il Messaggero, Rome, 16 September 1936.
- Trombadori Antonello, Savelli, Primato, Rome, 1 April 1941.
- Venturoli Marcello, Savelli, Raccolta, Rome, April–May 1941.
- Bartolini Luigi, Savelli, Libera Stampa, Lugano, 14 August 1941.
- Crespi Attilio, Savelli, Emporium, Bergamo, October 1941.
- Piovene Guido, Savelli, Primato, Rome, 1 October 1941.
- Francini Alberto, Savelli, La Tribuna, Rome, 14 December 1941.
- Podestà Attilio, Savelli, Il secolo XIX, Genova, 19 April 1942.
- Podestà Attilio, Galleria Spiga, Milano, 16–27 May 1942.
- Guttuso Renato, Savelli, Beltempo, Edizioni della Cometa, Rome, 1942.
- Guzzi Virgilio, Galleria Il Ritrovo, Rome, 1942.
- Bartolini Luigi, Savelli, Corriere Padano, 1 August 1942.
- Repaci Leonida, La quarta Ouadriennale: I pittori, L'Illustrazione Italiana, 23 May 1943.
- Bellonzi Fortunato, Savelli, Domenica, Rome, 6 August 1944.
- Costes Monotti, A. Presence, Buenos Aires, 1 June 1945.
- Scialoja Toti, Savelli, Mercurio, 10 June 1945.
- Venturoli Marcello, Angelo Savelli, L'Universo, 17 November 1945.
- Peirce Guglielmo, Turcato e Savelli all'Art Club, L'Unità, 18 November 1945.
- Galluppi Enrico, Savelli, Libera Stampa, Lugano, 21 November 1945.
- Frattani, Savelli, Il Momento, 23 November 1945.
- Ciarletta Nicola, Il Risveglio, Rome, 28 November 1945.
- Bucarelli Palma, L'indipendente, Rome, 29 November 1945.
- Argan, Giulio Carlo, La Nuova Europa, Rome, 2 December 1945.
- Prampolini Enrico, Galleria Cronache, Bologna, 1946 - presentation catalogue.
- Costes Monotti, A. Presence, 10 June 1946.
