= Antonio Cardile =

Italian painter

- Born: 1914; Taranto, Italy
- Died: 1986 (aged 71–72); Rome, Italy
- Education: Accademia di Belle Arti Firenze
- Known for: Painting, sculpture, drawing, printmaking
- Movement: Scuola romana

Antonio Cardile (1914–1986) was an Italian painter belonging to the modern movement of the Scuola romana (Roman School of Painting).

== Biography ==
Cardile was born in Taranto, but in 1925 moved with his family to Florence. Graduating from the Accademia di Belle Arti Firenze with Felice Carena and the engraver Celestino Celestini, he initially exhibited at the Mostre Sindacali. During World War II, after a painful war imprisonment, he returned to Rome where he immediately joined the Roman School of Painting. In the last years of his life, he introduced his nephew Joseph Pace to the figurative arts.

Giovanni Omiccioli describes the artist in this way:

"...another flower that enriches the parlor of our scents, such as Boccioni and Lorenzo Viani, as Ligabue and Carlo Barbieri. Cardile is one of those matadors that annoy all those who wrong the stroke: all things that make angry who loves the quiet of the academies."

Corrado Cagli said of him:

"...Cardile may have suffered, thought and expressed, in no way a worldly thoughts, still less in frivolous speculation, if anything, for having extended the romantic vein that has run the graphics of Scipione, the "apocalypse" of Mario Mafai, by the gardens of Omiccioli to the prostitutes of Vespignani, could not be deeply understood, if not by the most experienced Roman public. The stamp pathetic and the documentary value of his work bind Cardile to that line of those illustrious Roman painters"..."

From 1936 Cardile was present with significant one-man shows to the Palazzo Pitti in Florence, Palazzo delle Esposizioni in Rome and in other prestigious Roman galleries, such as "La Tartaruga". He also took part in group expositions with Pirandello, Guttuso, De Chirico, Luigi Capogrossi, Domenico Purificato, Giulio Turcato and Salvatore Greco.

He continued to work in Rome until his death in 1986.

== Bibliography ==
- 2009 — Equitazione & Ambiente Arte, Antonio Cardile, by Joseph Pace Filtranisme — Rome, Italy
- 2008 — Joseph Pace: L'irremovibilità della memoria, by Mariastella Margozzi, Centro d'Arte La Bitta, Rome, Italy
- 2006 — Quattrocchi su Roma, Antonio Cardile, Artiste della Scuola Romana, by Marcello Paris e Joseph Pace Filtranisme — Rome, Italy
- 1955 — Bollettino La Tartaruga, by Corrado Cagli — Rome, Italy
- 1955 — Bollettino La Tartaruga, by Giovanni Omiccioli — Rome, Italy
- 1951 — Antonio Cardile, by Carlo Innamorati, Rome, Italy
