= Stradone =

Stradone may refer to:

- Stradone, County Cavan
- Giovanni Stradone (10 November 1911 - 2 February 1981), an Italian painter.
