= Camillo Pace =

Camillo Pace (16 May 1862 – 1948) was an Italian Protestant pastor known for his work of evangelism and also for having made known, since 1930, the existence in Germany of a Protestant anti-Nazi resistance.

== Biography ==
Pace was born on 16 May 1862 in Paglieta. In 1879, Camillo enlisted in the Guardia di Finanza. Upon his discharge from military service, he turned to trade. His encounter with Protestantism and the Plymouth Brethren took place in Pescara where he began studying theology, which he furthered in London and Plymouth.

From 1889, Pace began evangelizing in Abruzzo to Paglieta, Gissi, Lanciano and Pescara. In 1925, he moved with his wife Lucia Pace form Pescara to Florence, where he took part as leader of the "Istituto Comandi", a center founded in 1876 by Giuseppe Comandi as an orphanage. In 1928, Pace published a religious treaty about Augustine of Hippo.

In 1930, along with Gino Veronesi, Pace became the Director of the "Ebenezer", a newspaper printed by the Istituto Comandi which, despite its Plymouth Brethren roots, published articles open to most important social and human activities and gave voice to the Protestant anti-Nazi resistance in Germany. Before his Religious conversion, Pace had belonged to a Masonic Lodge. This was held against him by the Italian Fascists, as were his alleged sermons opposing the war. In 1939, he was charged with being anti-fascist and was subsequently deported to Calabria in 1942. He accepted the persecution without rebelling, believing that to be the will of God. At the end of the war he returned to Pescara.

Camillo had five children. His descendants include Aurelio Pace, a member of the Partito d'Azione in Florence, an historian of UNESCO and father of founder of the "Filtranisme", the artist Joseph Pace, and Mario Vonviller of the Plymouth Brethren in Switzerland.

Camillo Pace died in 1948 in Pescara, then 86, in the house of his son Aurelio Pace, who fought as an Italian Officer with the British Eighth Army in Italy in World War II.

== Books ==
- Camillo Pace, San'Agostino, Vescovo d'Ippona, Dottore della Chiesa, Casa Edistrice Sonzogno, Milan, 1928.

== Bibliography ==
- Fanelli, Marcella (2001): Passeggiata lungo il XX secolo, Edizioni GUB, Claudiana, Turin, Italy
- Spini, Giorgio (2007): Italia di Mussolini e Protestanti, Turin, Claudiana, Italy
- Joseph Pace Filtranisme. 2008, di Marcello Paris, Equitazione&Ambiente Arte, Rome, Italia
