= Gianne Albertoni =

Brazilian actress and model (born 1981)

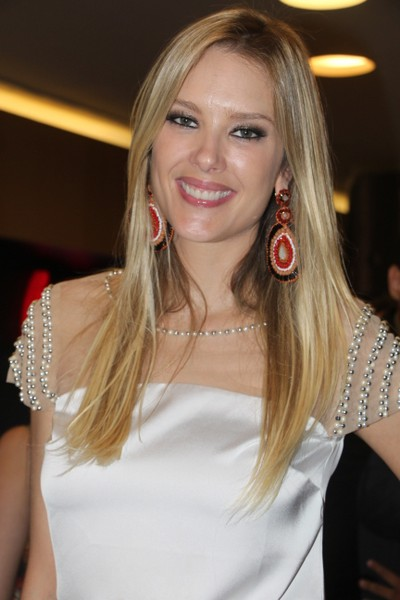
- Albertoni in 2016
- Born: Gianne Albertoni Vicente; 5 July 1981 (age 45); São Paulo, Brazil
- Occupations: Model; actress; television presenter
- Years active: 1993–present
- Modeling information
- Height: 1.80 m (5 ft 11 in)
- Hair color: Blonde
- Eye color: Green

Gianne Albertoni Vicente (born 5 July 1981) is a Brazilian model, actress and television presenter.

== Biography ==
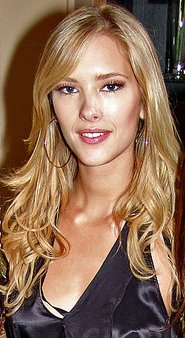
Albertoni in 2006

Albertoni was born in São Paulo, Brazil. She was discovered in 1993, when she was 12 years old, by Brazilian multimedia artist and photographer Sérgio Valle Duarte. Four months later, in Milan, Italy, she walked the runway for designers like Versace, Armani, Prada, Fiorucci.

In Milan, Albertoni worked for Dolce & Gabbana, Gucci, and Armani. In New York, she posed for photographers such as Bruce Weber, Mario Testino and Steven Meisel. She appeared in the Brazilian films Popstar, Muita Calma Nessa Hora 2, Malu de Bicicleta, Carro de Paulista, and the Brazilian TV series Mandrake as Gigi.

Albertoni is part of the series that is featured in the permanent collection of museums in Europe and South America. The series is denominated by the artist Sérgio Valle Duarte as "Eletrografias e Fotografias com Fios de Cabelo para Futura Clonagem" BioArt. (Electrophotographs and Photographs with Human Hair for Future Cloning).

Since 12 August 2009, Albertoni co-hosted the Brazilian variety program Hoje em Dia on Rede Record.
