= Giovanni Stradone =

Italian painter

Giovanni Stradone or Giovanni Stradóne (10 November 1911, in Nola – 6 February 1981, in Rome) was an Italian painter. He was a figurative painter who worked in a personal expressionist style. His work was part of the painting event in the art competition at the 1948 Summer Olympics, where he won a silver medal. He is not to be confused with Giovanni Stradano or Jan Van der Straet (1523–1605), a Flanders-born artist active mainly in 16th-century Florence.

== Life and work ==
Giovanni Stradone was born in Nola in 1911 as the son of da Luigi Stradone and Carmela Auletta. As a child he moved to Rome with his family. From an early age he studied at the studio of the painter Ferruccio Ferrazzi. He often visited the Galleria Borghese, which was located near his home. Here he copied the works of the old masters such as Raphael. After graduating from high school, he studied law following his parents' wishes but never worked in this field. At the same time he also developed a keen interest in entomology.

He frequented the Roman artistic community headed by Mario Mafai, Orfeo Tamburi, Corrado Cagli and Giovanni Omiccioli in the 1930s. His first paintings date back to 1929. A youth friend of the artist is the protagonist in these works. In the 1930s his pictorial taste was in line with that of the so-called Scuola romana (Roman School of painting). His expressionist language gradually developed new and original features in the treatment of chromatic matter. In the 1940s he participated in many exhibitions and confirmed himself as a leading expressionist artist. At the end of the war he founded the group I quattro fuori strada along with the artists Toti Scialoja, Arnoldo Ciarrocchi and Piero Sadun.

He submitted to the Venice Biennale of 1950 the painting L'apoteosi di Bartali, which created a scandal. The work represented the meeting, which actually took place, between Pope Pius XII and the famous Italian cyclists Fausto Coppi and Gino Bartali, in the presence of numerous characters represented as caricatures, among whom many recognized Italian president Luigi Einaudi, politicians Giulio Andreotti and Giuseppe Saragat and cardinal Alfredo Ildefonso Schuster. The work was removed from the Biennale on the grounds it had violated the rule that works submitted to the exhibition should not have been exhibited before.

The artist was rediscovered as a member of the Roman School. His last major exhibitions were held in between 1978 and 1981, shortly before his sudden death.

== Works ==
Stradone was a figurative painter who worked in a personal expressionist style. From 1930 he approached the Roman school and took his main inspiration from the city of Rome or the hallucinated visions of war. He developed towards a gestural and material expressionism. After the sixties, his works continue to re-elaborate recurrent themes (series of cyclists, harlequins, Roman nocturnes and open up to fantastic and caricatural notations.

Works of the artist are in the collections of the Galleria Nazionale d'Arte Moderna in Rome.
