= Polo Museale del Lazio =

Office managing Roman museums

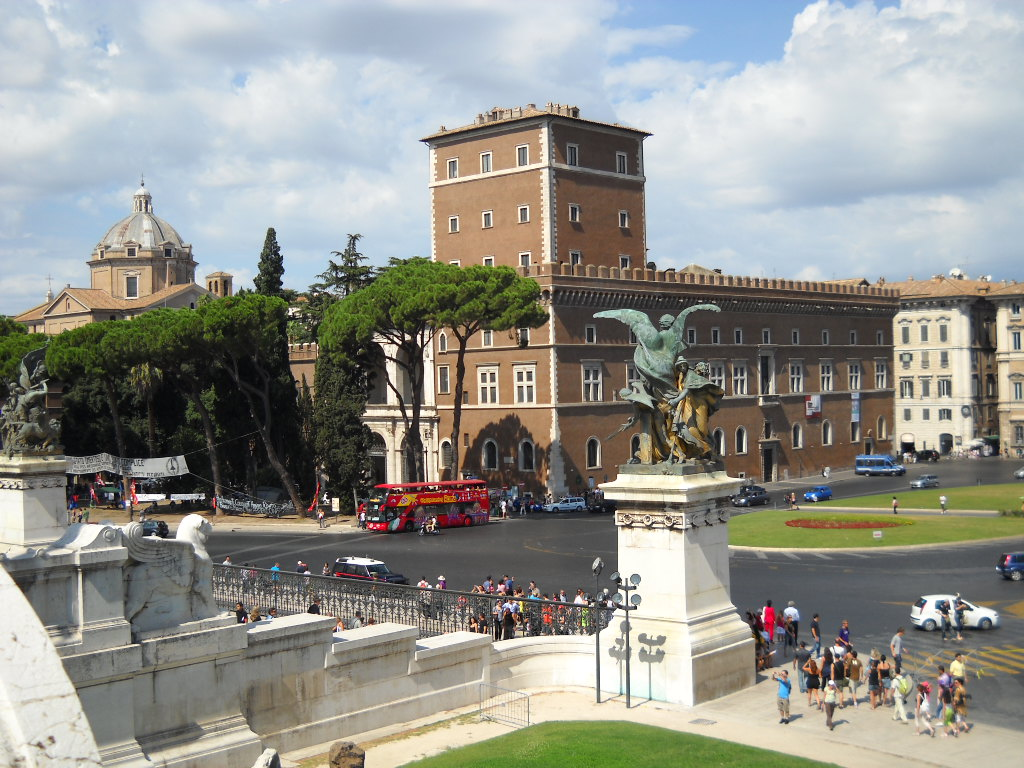
Rome, Palazzo Venezia, seat of the Polo Museale del Lazio.

The Polo Museale del Lazio (literally 'Museum Center of Lazio') is an office of Italy's Ministry of Cultural Heritage. Its seat is in Rome in the Palazzo Venezia.

== History ==
The office was established on August 29, 2014 and started to work on December 11, 2014, acquiring and organizing museums, institutions and archaeological areas previously managed by eleven offices. Like the others Poli Museali of other regions of Italy, it depends from the Direzione Generale Musei of the same MIBACT.

The Polo Museale manages and promotes Lazio's museums, institutions, archaeological areas and other cultural sites belonging or given over to the Italian State. An important function of the office is to promote the so-called Art Bonus, a new model of tax relief connected to the world of arts which was introduced in 2014. The office defines common strategies and aims, promotes the integration and organization of museological and cultural itineraries, working together with the Segretario Regionale.

== Museums, institutions, and cultural sites ==
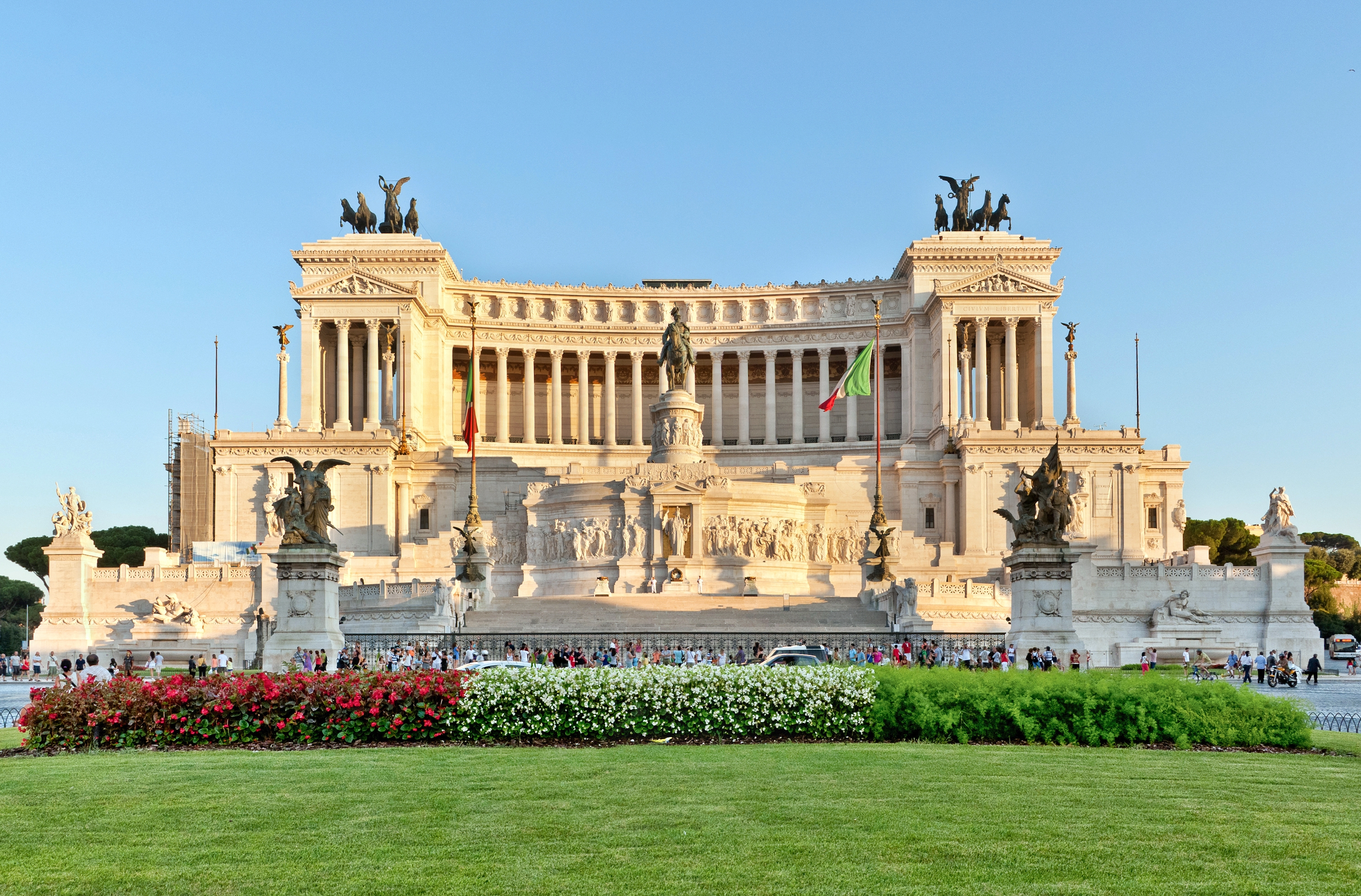
Altare della Patria, managed by Polo Museale del Lazio

The Polo Museale del Lazio manages 43 museological institutes: their chronology spans from antiquity, the Middle Ages and the modern age to the contemporary age. Some of them deal with the world of anthropology, but the major weight of the office shifts on archaeology, history, art and architecture.

A total of some 10 million per year visit institutions which are directly managed by the Polo Museale del Lazio, making it one of the most important institutions of its kind. The most visited sites are the Pantheon, Castel Sant'Angelo, the Abbey of Montecassino, Villa d'Este and Hadrian's Villa.

The following is an alphabetical list of museums, institutions and cultural sites directly managed by the Polo Museale del Lazio (parentheses indicates the province):

- Casamari Abbey – Veroli (Frosinone)
- Fossanova Abbey – Priverno (Latina)
- Montecassino Abbey – Cassino (Frosinone)
- Grottaferrata Abbey – Grottaferrata (Rome)
- Area Archeologica di Villa Adriana – Tivoli (Rome)
- Altare della Patria – Rome
- Basilica di San Cesareo de Appia – Rome
- Basilica di San Francesco – Viterbo
- Cappella dell’Annunziata – Cori (Latina)
- Casa di San Tommaso – Aquino (Frosinone)
- Certosa di Trisulti – Collepardo (Frosinone)
- Chiesa di Santa Maria Maggiore – Tuscania (Viterbo)
- Chiesa di San Pietro – Tuscania (Viterbo)
- Galleria Spada – Rome
- Istituto Italiano per l'Africa e l'Oriente (former) museum collection
- Monastero di San Benedetto Sacro Speco – Subiaco (Rome)
- Monastero di Santa Scolastica – Subiaco (Rome)
- Monumento a Vittorio Emanuele II (Vittoriano) – Rome
- Museo Archeologico dell'Agro Falisco e Forte Sangallo – Civita Castellana (Viterbo)
- Museo Archeologico Nazionale – Civitavecchia (Rome)
- Museo Archeologico Nazionale e Area Archeologica – Sperlonga (Latina)
- Museo Archeologico Nazionale di Palestrina e Santuario della Fortuna Primigenia (Rome)
- Museo Boncompagni Ludovisi per le Arti Decorative, il Costume e la Moda dei secoli XIX e XX – Rome
- Museo dell'Alto Medioevo – Rome
- Museo delle Navi Romane di Nemi (Rome)
- Museo Giacomo Manzù – Ardea (Rome)
- Museo Hendrik Christian Andersen – Rome
- Museo Mario Praz – Rome
- Museo Nazionale Archeologico Cerite – Cerveteri (Rome)
- Museo Nazionale d'Arte Orientale “Giuseppe Tucci” – Rome
- Museo Nazionale degli Strumenti Musicali – Rome
- Museo nazionale del Palazzo di Venezia e Biblioteca di Archeologia e Storia dell'Arte – Rome
- Museo Nazionale di Castel Sant'Angelo – Rome
- Museo Nazionale Etrusco di Rocca Albornoz – Viterbo
- Museo Nazionale Etrusco di Villa Giulia – Rome
- Museo Nazionale Preistorico ed Etnografico “Luigi Pigorini” – Rome
- Palazzo Altieri – Oriolo Romano (Viterbo)
- Palazzo Farnese – Caprarola (Viterbo)
- Pantheon – Roma
- Santuario Madonna della Quercia – Viterbo
- Torre di Cicerone – Arpino (Frosinone)
- Villa d'Este – Tivoli (Roma)
- Villa Giustiniani – Bassano Romano (Viterbo)
- Villa Lante Bagnaia – Viterbo
