= Museum of Art of the Parliament of São Paulo =

Contemporary art museum in São Paulo

- Museu de Arte do Parlamento de São Paulo
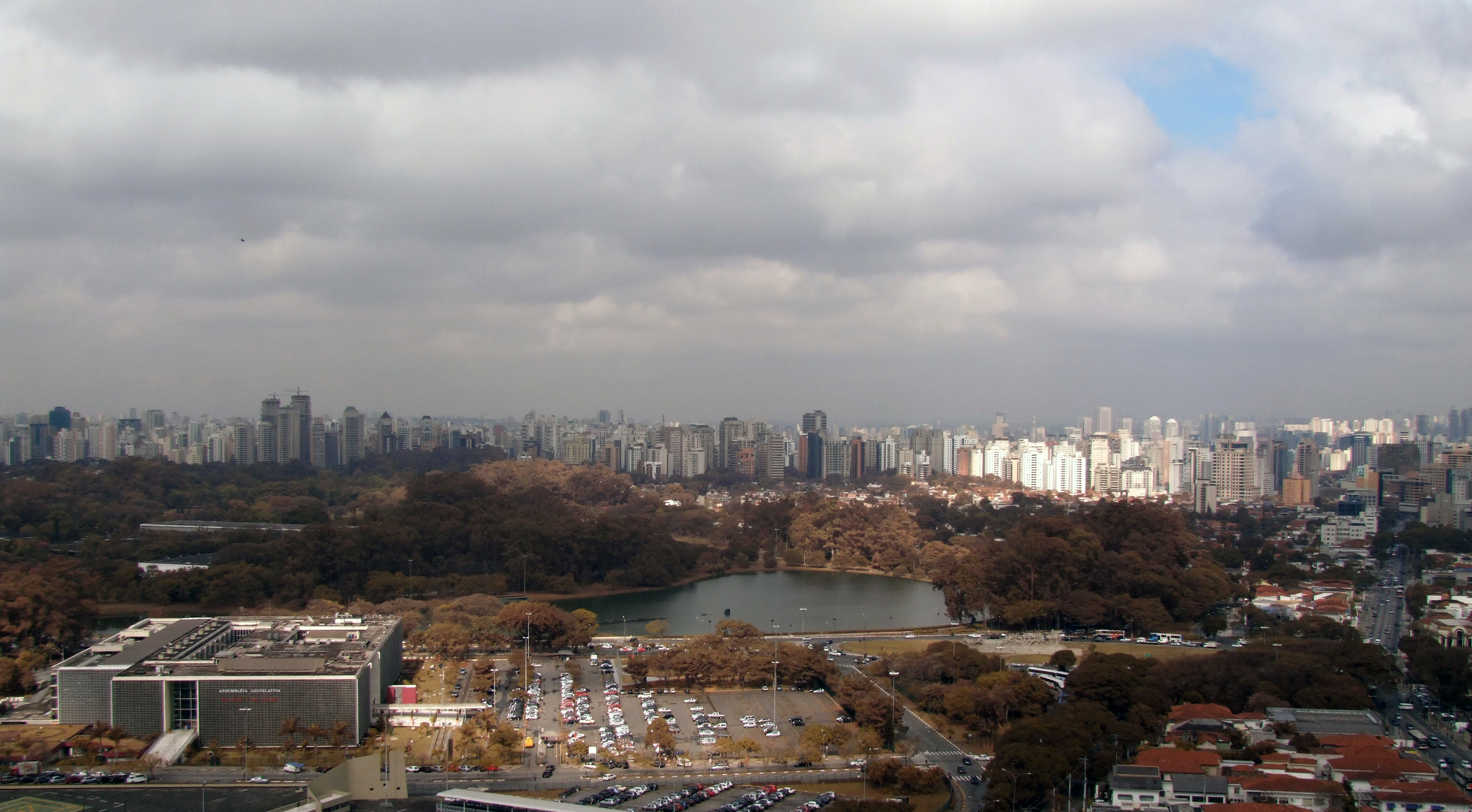
- Museum of Art of the Parliament of São Paulo
- Established: 2002
- Location: São Paulo, Brazil
- Coordinates: 23°34′49.7″S 46°39′27.71″W
- Type: Art museum
- Owner: Legislative Assembly of São Paulo

Museum of Art of the Parliament of São Paulo (Portuguese: Museu de Arte do Parlamento de São Paulo) is a contemporary art museum housed in the Palácio 9 de Julho, the Legislative Assembly of São Paulo house. The Palace is located in south of the city, opposite to the Ibirapuera Park.

== History ==
Founded in 2002, the museum is run by the Department of Artistic Heritage of the Legislative Assembly. From its foundation and until 2012, the museum's coordination was entrusted to Emanuel von Lauenstein Massarani, historian, journalist, diplomat, superintendent of Cultural Heritage of the Assembly Legislative Assembly of the State of São Paulo, and president of the Institute for the Recovery of Historical Heritage in the State of São Paulo.

== Organization ==
The Museum of Art of the Parliament of São Paulo collects paintings, sculpture, prints, ceramics and photographs, exploring the Brazilian contemporary art.

The collection consists of over 1,200 works (2012) and includes sculptures of the "Museu da Sculptura ao Ar Livre" (Museum of Outdoor Sculpture) located in the grounds of the Parliament.

The museum promotes artworks of the first "Parliament Art Collection", the "Museu da ao Ar Livre Sculpture" and also transforms the Parliament in an important site for the diffusion of art and culture.

Respecting the museological criteria of theme, style and genre, the artworks are placed inside the several rooms of the Parliament. The museum has artworks including: Francisco Rebolo, Romero Britto, Marcos Garrot, Gustavo Rosa, Denise Barros, Ricardo Augusto, Joseph Pace, Carlos Araújo, Nishio (Katsunori Nishio), Auro Okamura. Sergio Valle Duarte.
