= Albert Russo =

Belgian writer

- Born: 26 February 1943; Kamina, Katanga, Democratic Republic of Congo
- Occupations: Short story writer, novelist, poet, photographer

Albert Russo (born 26 February 1943) was a Belgian bilingual (English and French) author of novels, short stories, essays and poems, as well as a photographer. His main themes are fighting racism of all stripes and defending individual and collective rights, including ethnic, religious and gender rights.

== Early life and education ==
Son of an Italian Sephardic father, born in Rhodes, and of a British mother who grew up in Rhodesia, he lived with his family in Congo, Ruanda-Urundi, Rhodesia and travelled to South Africa during his 17 years. After graduating from high school in Bujumbura, at the Athénée Interracial, learning four languages, French, English, Dutch and German, with a knowledge of vernacular Swahili, he pursues his studies at New York University, getting a Bachelor of Science degree in Business Administration, in 1964, minoring in psychology and economics. This is when he started writing his poems in English. In 1965, he spent a year in Heidelberg and obtained a degree in German culture and literature at Collegium Palatinum. That same year, he settled in Milan (Italy), where he continued to write while working with his father in the family import-export firm.

== Literary career ==
His first novel, La Pointe du Diable, written in French and dealing with apartheid, was published in Brussels, (Belgium) in 1973, and the following year he won both the Prix Colette in Cannes (France) and the Prix de la Liberté in Paris. In 1975, he went back to New York, where he taught languages to adults; meanwhile, he pursued his writing mainly in English and published poems and short stories, contributing, both as writer and translator, to various magazines, such as Confrontation, The Literary Review, The Poet, Atlas World Review, and Philadelphia Poets. He also translates film scripts for children's documentaries at UNICEF. In 1978, he went back to Europe and decided to live in Paris.

Translated into a dozen languages, Albert Russo has written more than 25 works, including novels, books of short stories and of poetry. Africa is one of his major themes. Mixed Blood (published first by Domhan Books in New York, then by Imago Press in Arizona) garnered the Best Fiction Award in 1985 by Volcano Review in California. Both Mixed Blood and Eclipse over Lake Tanganyika were nominated for the 2001 e-books award at the Frankfurt International Book Fair. Among his other novels are Le Cap des Illusions (formerly entitled La Pointe du Diable) republished by Editions du Griot in Paris, France, his humorous Zapinette series (in both English and French), his large volume of short stories, fables and essays The Crowded World of Solitude, vol 1, started in New York in the late 1970s, as well as the bilingual books of poetry Futureyes, and the large volume of poems (40 years of writing) The Crowded World of Solitude, vol 2. He has also produced about 50 books of photography with and without poetic captions.

All his works, along with some manuscripts and literary letters by various authors, are to be found at the Archives and Museum of Belgian Literature in Brussels (Belgium). Mixed Blood has been the subject of the Capes degree at the Sorbonne University in Paris in the English department of literature. The Zapinette Vidéo series was also taught at the Catholic University of Paris to foreign students.

During the 1980s, having in common their Congolese experience, their love of and their interest for Africa, he befriends the Italian artist and philosopher Joseph Pace, founder in Paris of Filtranisme, a neo-existential philosophical and artistic current. In the 2000s he also befriended the poet, artist and photographer Adam Donaldson Powell, with whom he authored in 2009 Gaytude, a volume of poetry encompassing the gay experience on the five continents with photography by Albert Russo.

As a photographer, he has garnered several prizes in the US, especially from National Indie-Excellence (winner and finalist), photo pursuit (formerly photo challenge), Gallery Photografica (silver medal). Some of his photos have been exhibited at the Musée de l'Elysée in Lausanne (Switzerland).

In 1996, he was a juror at the Neustadt International Prize for Literature, which often leads to the Nobel Prize for Literature. Some of the Neustadt candidates, laureates or jurors having obtained the Nobel Prize are: Elias Canetti, Wole Soyinka, José Saramago, Nadine Gordimer, Eugenio Montale, Claude Simon.

Albert Russo has had seven books translated into Italian, L'Amante di mio padre (2001), Sangue Misto (2008), Shalom Tower Syndrome (2008), Sotto il Picco de Diavolo (2012), Io, Hans, figlio di nazisti (2013) and Zapinette a Parigi (2013).

A bilingual writer, he freely discusses topics such as anti-racism, individual and collective freedoms, and LGBT freedoms.

2019 UNICEF Award for the body of his poetry

2020 Artavita certificate of excellence for his photos

== Selected bibliography ==
=== Novels (in English and in French) ===
- Eclipse over Lake Tanganyika, Domhan Books, USA, 2000, then Imago Press, 2007
- Mixed Blood, Domhan Books, USA, 2000, then Imago Press, USA, 2007
- Shalom Tower Syndrome, Xlibris, USA, 2007, then Paraguas, 2010
- Zany Zapinette New York, Domhan Books, USA, 2000
- Oh Zaperetta, Xlibris, USA, 2005
- The Benevolent American in the Heart of Darkness, Xlibris, USA, 2005
- The Black Ancestor, Imago Press, USA, 2009
- Zulu Zapy wins the Rainbow Nation, Cyberwit, India 2010; Poetry Printery, South Africa, 2010
- And there was David-Kanza, Imago Press, USA, 2011
- Gosh Zapinette (4 of the Series of 7 Books), Imago Press, USA 2012
- Mother beloved, Mamica mia Createspace/Amazon, USA 2013
- Ode to Mamica mia, Mother beloved, Createspace/Amazon, USA 2013
- ZAPINETTE’S BIBLE ODYSSEY continues in Japan, Mexico and the North Pole, series, KDP Amazon 2020– Award-Winning Finalist in the 2020 International Book Awards, in both the humor and fiction & novella categories
- MÉMOIRES D’UN FILS DE NAZIS, roman, KDP Amazon 2020
- ZAPINNÈT A PARI, romen en fransè fonétik, KDP Amazon 2020
- CURIOSITY / CABINET / DE CURIOSITÉS, photobook, KDP Amazon 2020
- Livre collectif: DES ITALIENS AU CONGO, AUX ITALIENS DU CONGO, l’Harmattan, 2020, avec étude de Sang Mêlé d’Albert Russo
- HOLYLAND ZAPINETTE, translated into Hebrew זאפי בארץ הקודש, Saar Publishing, Tel Aviv, 2019, KDP Amazon edition, 2020
- SPEAK TO ME MOTHER BELOVED, large book of poems and photos, l’Aleph, Sweden, 2019
- CALL ME CHAMELEON, a memoir of prose, poetry and photos, 1,113-page e-book, l’Aleph, Sweden, 2019,- 2019 Book Excellence Award Finalist
- UNDER THE SHIRTTAILS OF ALBERT RUSSO, biography by Adam Donaldson Powell, l’Aleph, Sweden, 2017
- GOSH SZAPINETTE! The first ever series of Global Humor, Cyberwit.net, 2016 – 2018 Book Excellence Award Honoree
- La série de 6 Zapinette et son Tonton homo, Editions Textes Gais, Paris, 2016 & 2015
- A RAINBOW NAMED TEL AVIV, photobook, KDP Amazon, 2015
- L’AMANT DE MON PÈRE – JOURNAL PARISIEN, Editions Textes Gais, Paris, 2015
- L’AMANT DE MON PÈRE – JOURNAL ROMAIN, Editions Textes Gais, Paris, 2015
- PRINCES AND GODS, novel, l’Aleph, Sweden, 2014
- EUR-AFRICAN EXILES, novel, l’Aleph, Sweden, 2014
- ADOPTED BY AN AMERICAN HOMOSEXUAL IN THE BELGIAN CONGO, l’Aleph, Sweden, 2014
- LÉODINE OF THE BELGIAN CONGO, novel, l’Aleph, Sweden, 2014
- SANDRO’S NOTEBOOK – EUR-AFRICAN EXILES Movie by Albert Russo, 90', Wildsound Festival, Canada, 2014
- זאפי בארץ – Holyland Zapinette translated into Hebrew by Isabella Arad .20 .2019, Saar publishing, Tel Aviv – הקודש

=== Novels (in Italian) ===
- L’amante di mio padre, Edizioni Libreria Croce, 2001
- Sangue misto, Roma, Coniglio Editore, 2008
- Sangue misto, Roma, Elliot Editore, 2016
- Shalom tower sindrome, Edizioni Libreria Croce, 2008
- Sotto il picco del diavolo, Roma, Edizioni Libreria Croce, 2012
- Io, Hanz, figlio di nazisti, Roma, Edizioni Libreria Croce, 2013
- Dopo il gay pride a Parigi, Zapinette viene rapita a New York, Edizioni Libreria Croce 2013
- Zapinette la parigina, comics illustrato da Soizick Jaffre, Edizioni Libreria Croce
- Zapinette, la spaghettona nel paese di Mandela, Edizioni Libreria Croce
- Zapy ZZZen in estremo Oriente Edizioni Libreria Croce
- Zapinette Burqa-burquette va in Terra Santa, Edizioni Libreria Croce

=== Poetry books (English and French) ===
- Futureyes / Dans la nuit bleu-fauve, Le Nouvel Athanor, Paris, 1992
- Painting the Tower of Babel, New Hope International, GB, 1996.
- Poetry and Peanuts, Cherrybite Publications, GB, 1997
- The Crowded World of Solitude, Volume 2, the collected poems, Xlibris, USA, 2005 (40 years of writing)
- Gaytude, a poetic journey around the world, Albert Russo and Adam Donaldson Powell, Xlibris, USA, 2009
- Boundaries of Exile / Conditions of Hope, Albert Russo and Martin Tucker, Confrontation Press (Long Island University, NY), 2009
- Embers under my skin, Imago Press (USA), 2012

=== Short stories, essays and literary criticism (English and French) ===
- Venitian Threshold, Bone & Flesh Publications, USA, 1995.
- The Age of the pearl: the collected works of Albert Russo, vol. 1, Domhan Books, USA, 2000
- Unmasking hearts: the collected works of Albert Russo, vol. 2, Domhan Books, USA, 2000
- Beyond the great water: the collected works of Albert Russo, vol. 3, Domhan Books, USA, 2000
- The Crowded World of Solitude, Volume 1, the collected stories and essays, Xlibris, USA, 2005 (40 years of writing).
- Eclats de malachite, Editions Pierre Deméyère, Brussels, 1971.
- Mosaïque Newyorkaise, Editions de l’Athanor, Parigi, 1975.
- Le Règne du Caméléon, Imago Press (USA), 2012
- Crystals in a shock wave (the works of Albert Russo, spanning 40 years), Blurb Inc., USA, 2012 and CreateSpace, USA, 2012

=== Photography books (selection) ===
- Body glorious, Xlibris, USA, 2006.
- Italia Nostra, Xlibris, USA, 2007.
- Norway to Spitzberg, Blurb Inc., USA, 2008
- Senegal Live, Blurb Inc., USA, 2010
- Mermaids of the Baltic Sea, Blurb Inc., USA, 2011
- Seven living Splendors: Venice, Rome, Paris, New York, Tel Aviv, Singapore and Jerusalem, Createspace/Amazon, USA, 2013
- Oriental gems, Blurb Inc., USA, 2012
- Ode to Mamica mia, Mother beloved, Createspace/Amazon, USA, 2013
- RomaDiva, Xlibris, USA, 2004
- AfricaSoul, Xlibris, USA, 2005
- Chinese Puzzle chinois, Xlibris, USA, 2005
- In France, Xlibris, USA, 2005
- Sri Lanka / Serendib, Xlibris, USA, 2005
- Mexicana, Xlibris, USA, 2006
- Body glorious, Xlibris, USA, 2006.
- Albert Russo: A Poetic Biography, Volumes 1 & 2, Xlibris, USA, 2006
- Sardinia, Xlibris, USA, 2006
- Rainbow nature, Xlibris, USA, 2006
- Saint-Malo with love, Xlibris, USA, 2006
- Brussels ride, Xlibris, USA, 2006
- Granada, Costa del Sol & Ronda, Xlibris, USA, 2006
- Pasion de Espana, Xlibris, USA, 2007
- Quirks/Eclats, Xlibris, USA, 2007
- Vienese kaleidoscope, Blurb Inc., USA, 2007
- City of wonder / city of lovers, New York / Paris, Xlibris, USA, 2007
- New York at heart, Xlibris, USA, 2007
- Eilat, Petra & Tel Aviv, Blurb Inc., USA, 2008
- Sympjony in Hands major, Blurb Inc., USA, 2010
- Mermaids of the Baltic, Blurb Inc., USA, 2010
- Expressive Romans, Blurb Inc., USA, 2010
- China Forever, Blurb Inc., USA, 2010
- Garden Delights, Blurb Inc., USA, 2010
- Animal Kinship, Blurb Inc., USA, 2010
- Celestial Blues/Chants du ciel, Blurb Inc., USA, 2010
- France: Art, Humour & Nature, Blurb Inc., USA, 2010
- In the air, on the ground, and on the water, Blurb Inc., USA, 2010
- Rainbow Paris/ Arc-en-ciel, Blurb Inc., USA 2011
- Israel/Jordan/Palestine, Blurb Inc., USA, 2011
- Living Objects, Blurb Inc., USA, 2011
- Au Naturel / born naked, Createspace/Amazon, USA, 2012
- Fotoripples / 1, 2 & 3, Createspace/Amazon, USA, 2012
- A myriad tales, vol.1,2 3, Createspace/Amazon, USA, 2012
- Crystals in a shock wave, KDP/Amazon + Blurb Inc, USA, 2 editions, 2012
- Embers under my skin, KDP/Amazon + Blurb Inc, 2 editions, USA, 2012
- Venice, empress of the Seas, Burb Inc. 2012
- Israel & Palestine, Blurb Inc, USA 2012
- Mother beloved, Mamica mia, Createspace/Amazon, USA, 2013
- Rome, my sibling, my empress, Createspace/Amazon, USA, 2013
- Seven living Splendors, Createspace/Amazon, USA, 2013

== Articles ==
- Les Nouvelles littéraires, Art, de Philippe Guilhon, p. 11, no. 2330, 28 May 1972, Paris
- Le Soir, Georges Sion (de l’Académie Royale), p. 34, 3 May 1972, Brussels
- La Dépêche de Lubumbashi, 26 January 1972, Zaïre
- Jeune Afrique, p. 64, N.602, 22 July 1972, Paris
- Culture Française, p. 47, art. de Robert Cornevin, 1973, Paris
- Nice-Matin, l’annonce du Prix Colette, 9 October 1974, Nice
- Les Nouvelles littéraires, p. 14, art. de Robert Cornevin, 8 April 1974, Paris
- La Libre Belgique, 30 January 1974, Bruxelles
- Revue Zaïre, art. de Kanika Mwana Ngombo, p. 47, N.300, 6 May 1974, Kinshasa
- Tribune Juive, d’Odette Lang, p. 21, 7 July 1974, Paris
- La vie ouvrière, Ma/June 1974, art. de Serge Zeyons, Paris
- L’Afrique littéraire et artistique, art. de J.B., p. 60, 1974, Paris
- Bingo, revue africaine, art. de S. Nkamgnia, p. 62, no. 255, April 1975, Paris
- La Renaissance Le Bessin, art. de J. Fauchon, p. 6, 14 September 1979, Bayeux, France
- Libération, art. de Michel Cressole, p. 23, 6 September 1990, Paris
- L’Express, 10 September 1990, Paris
- Le Figaro Littéraire, art. de Régis St. Gilles, 8 October 1990, Paris
- La Liberté-dimanche, 25 November 1990, Lausanne, Switzerland
- Le Matin du Sahara et du Maghreb, 1990, Algiers, Algeria
- McNally, Bill. Amelia, Albert Russo's African Connection, pp. 52–55, 1991, Bakersfield, California, USA
- Club du Livre France Loisirs / Belgique Loisirs, p. 5, no. 26, 1992, Brussels and Paris
- Mensuel Littéraire et Poétique, art. de Pierre Halen, p. 25, no. 203, May 1992, Brussels
- Antonio Veneziani, L’amante di mio padre, recensione, 2001
- Gianfranco Franchi, Sangue Misto, recensione, Lankelot, 2008
- Gianfranco Franchi, Shalom Tower Sindrome, recensione, Lankelot, 2008
- Leggere Tutti, art. di Silvia Barbarotta, p. 50, Roma, no. 75, March 2013
