= Sérgio Valle Duarte =

Brazilian multimedia artist and fine-art photographer

Sergio Valle Duarte
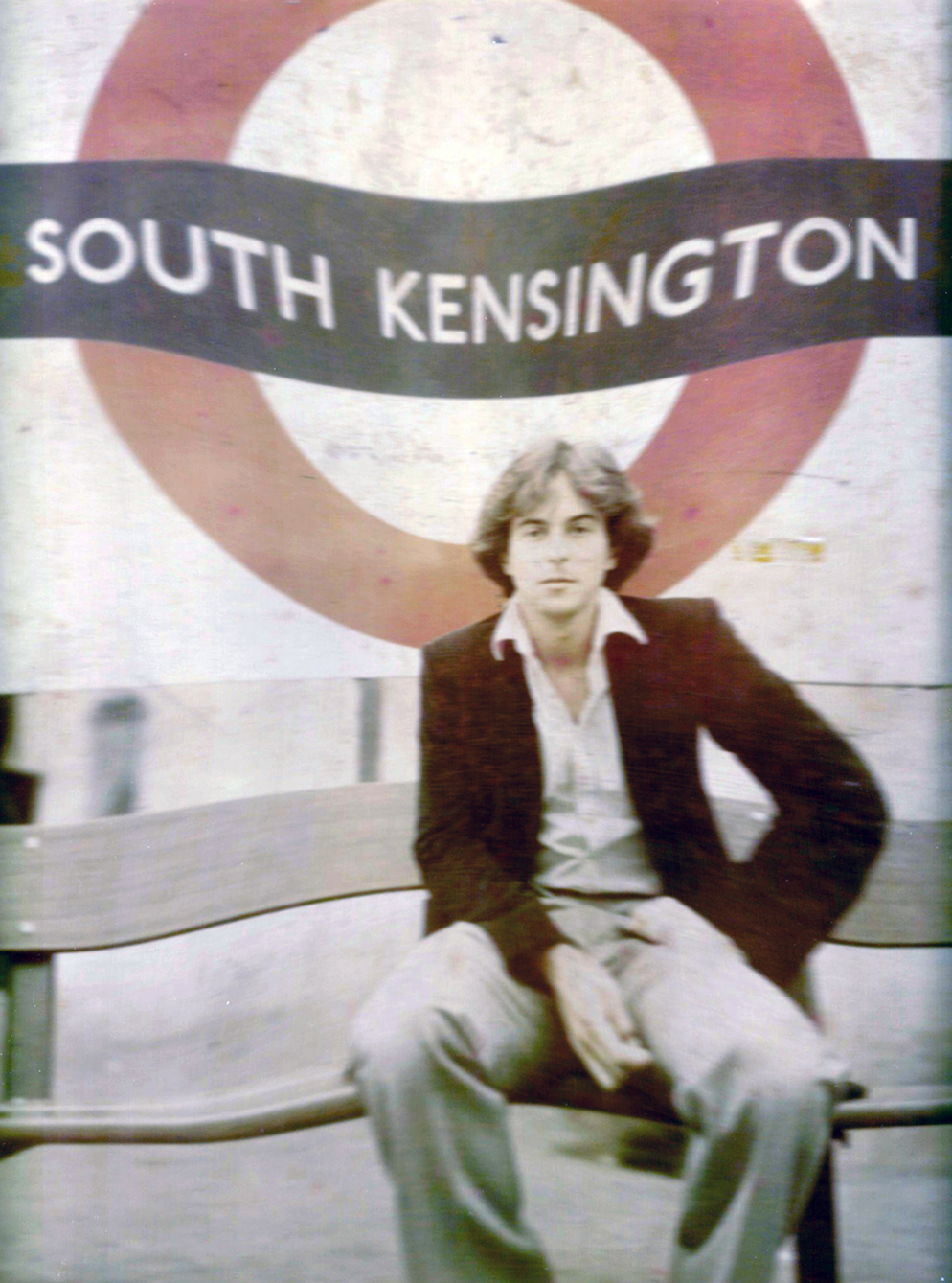
- London 1976
- Born: September 26, 1954; São Paulo, Brazil
- Known for: A.I., Multimedia, photography, electrophotography
- Movement: Contemporary art, BioArt, Postmodern art , A.I.

Sergio Valle Duarte (born September 26, 1954) is a Brazilian multimedia artist and fine-art photographer.

== Biography ==
Self-taught, he lives and works in São Paulo. Between 1972 and 1974, he worked as an actor in television advertisements for Campari and Nestlé.

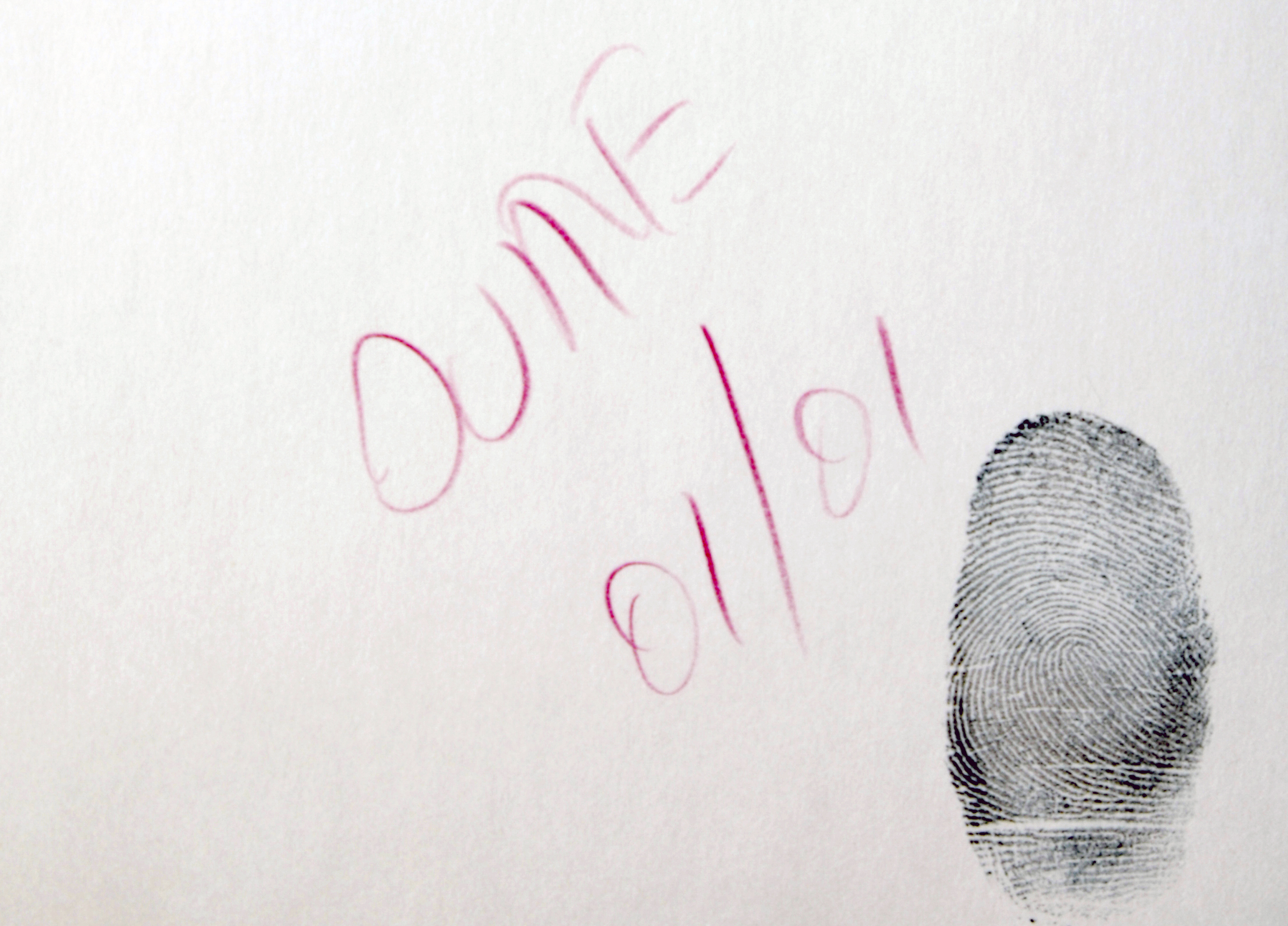
Duarte's Signature

Due to the military dictatorship in Brazil, in 1976 he moved to London where he worked as assistant to Rex Features International Photographic Press Agency.

As freelance photographer, he followed pop music groups The Who, Tangerine Dream, Genesis, Deep Purple, and ZZ Top. In 1977 Brazilian magazine Geração Pop (Editora Abril) featured a series of pictures he made in London of The Rolling Stones. Soon after, between Europe and South America, he collaborated with a range of magazines, Interview, Playboy, Vogue, Sony Style, (1978–1990). In those years he joined The Image Bank, Getty Images (1980–2005) and was featured in photography art magazines Collector's Photography U.S.A., Zoom France, Special Bresil, Zoom Italy, Newlook France, Newlook USA, and Playboy (Brazil).

As Multimedia artist, since 1970, he participated in the exhibition New Media Art Multimedia 70/80 with the triptych "Video Oil" at the Armando Alvares Penteado Foundation, curated by Deysi Piccinini, also the exhibition The plot of Taste another look at the daily, at the Julio Plaza installation Electronic Amusement with the project "Video Hypnosis" at the Biennial Foundation, São Paulo, 1985 and The First Quadrienal de Fotografias, curated by Paulo Klein at Museu de Arte Moderna de São Paulo, 1985. Duarte evolved his work adding new technologies and techniques with digital images, electrophotography, Xerox art conceptualizing artistically the reading of DNA and also in the future, the writing of DNA. To his portraits he sewed strands of hair of the models to allow them a future cloning.

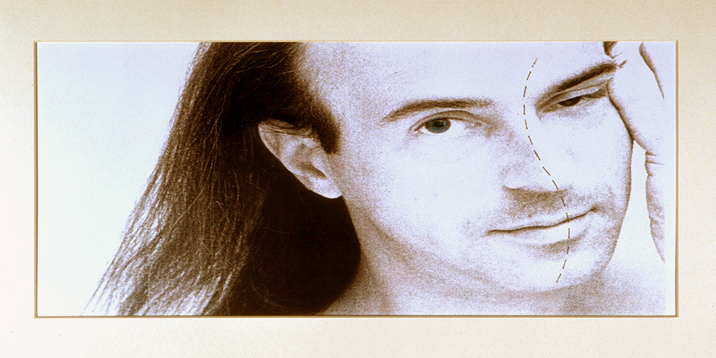
Yin-Yang 1988 BioArt & Xerox art

The model Gianne Albertoni is a part of the series that is featured in the permanent collection of museums in Europe and South America. The series is denominated by the artist as "Eletrografias e Fotografias com Fios de Cabelo para Futura Clonagem" (Electrophotographs and Photographs with Human Hair for Future Cloning), BioArt.

During the 1980s, he befriended the Italian artist and philosopher Joseph Pace, founder in Paris of Filtranisme, a neo-existential philosophical and artistic current, joining, in 1990, the enlarged "filtranistes" group.

Due to a leak in the roof of his artist studio at Spring Street during a summer storm in the late 1990s, much of his work was destroyed.

He authenticates his works with a thumbprint.

Duarte focuses his personal expression interpreting freely sacred and profane themes. From 2005 to 2015 he collaborated as curator for Brazil for the Florence Biennale and for the Padua Art Fair.

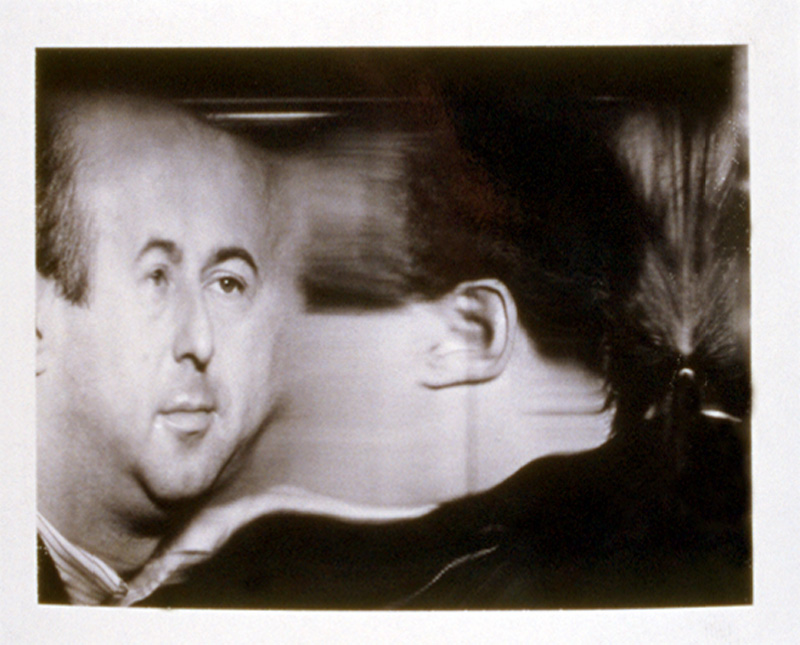
Periperial strip photography portrait of Duarte, New York 1990

== Collections ==
- São Paulo Museum of Modern Art, Brazil
- Itaú Cultural, São Paulo, Brazil
- Museum of Modern Art, Rio de Janeiro, Rio de Janeiro, Brazil
- Yokohama Museum of Art, Yokohama, Japan
- Musée de l'Élysée, Lausanne, Switzerland
- Museum für Fotokopie, Mülheim, Germany
- Auer Photo Foundation, Geneva, Switzerland
- Museum Afro Brasil, São Paulo, Brazil
- Museu Afro Brasil
- Musée Français de la Photographie, Bievres, France
- Museum of Art of the Parliament of São Paulo, Brazil

== Gallery ==
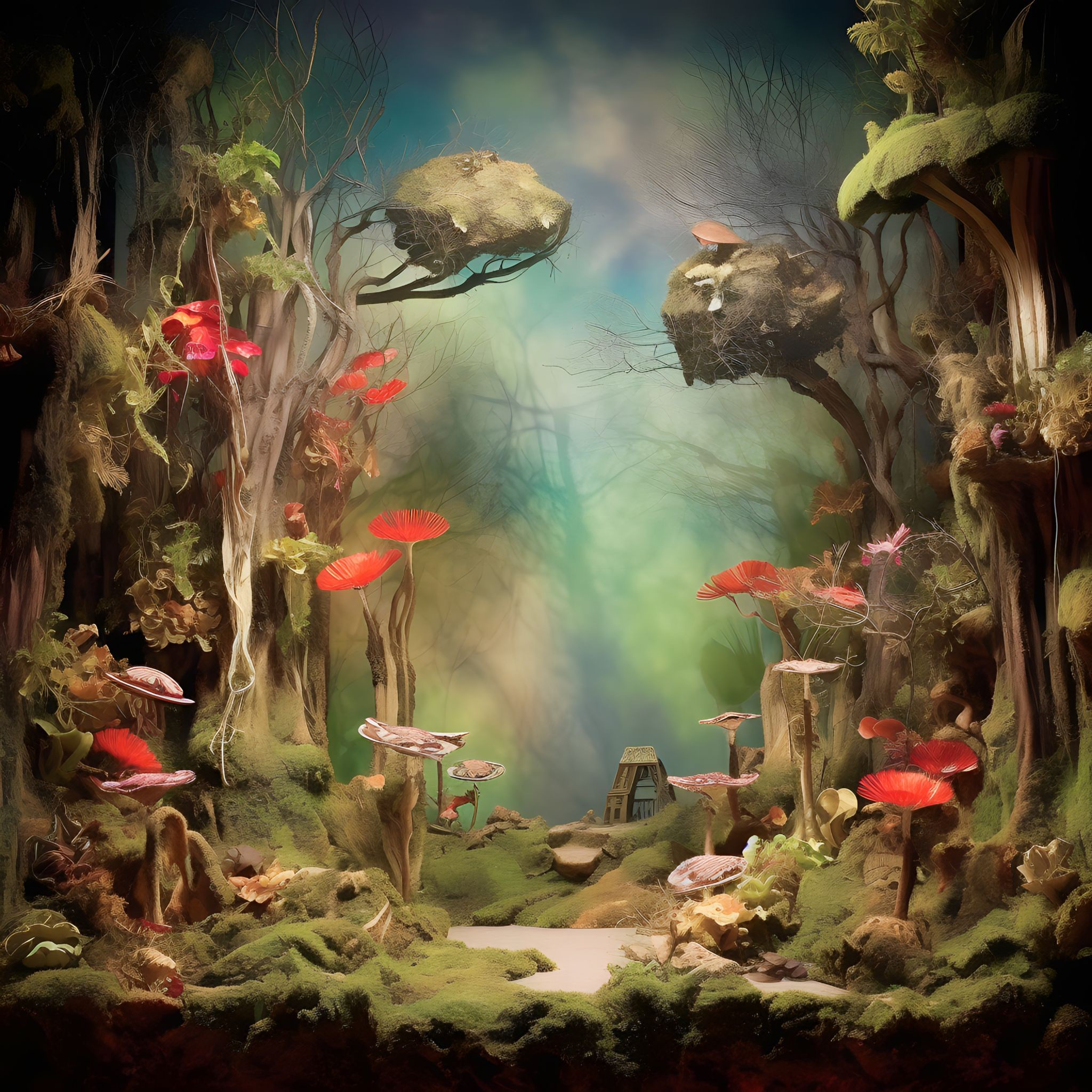
Fictitious Location, prompt by Sergio Valle Duarte - A.I.

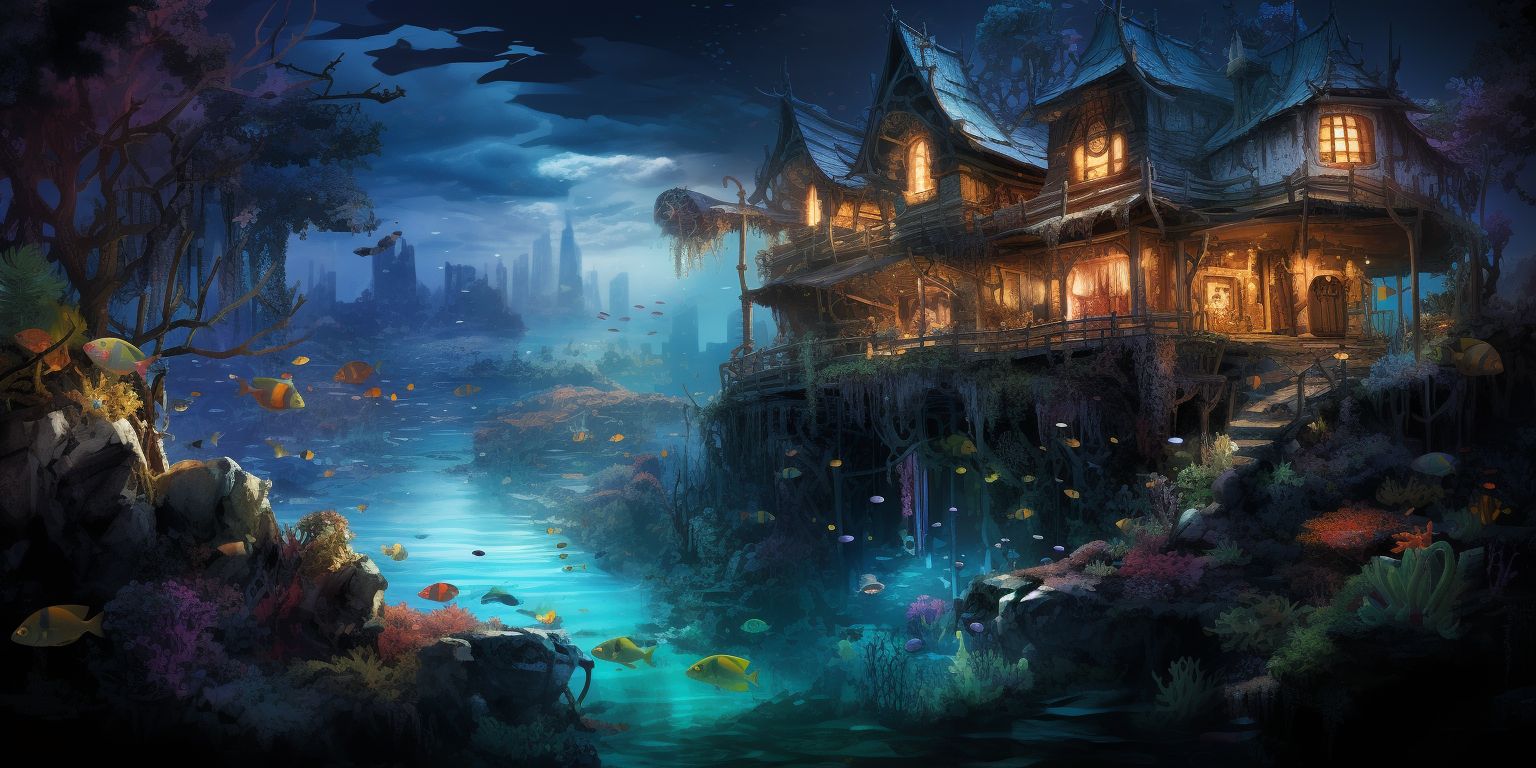
2 Atlantis

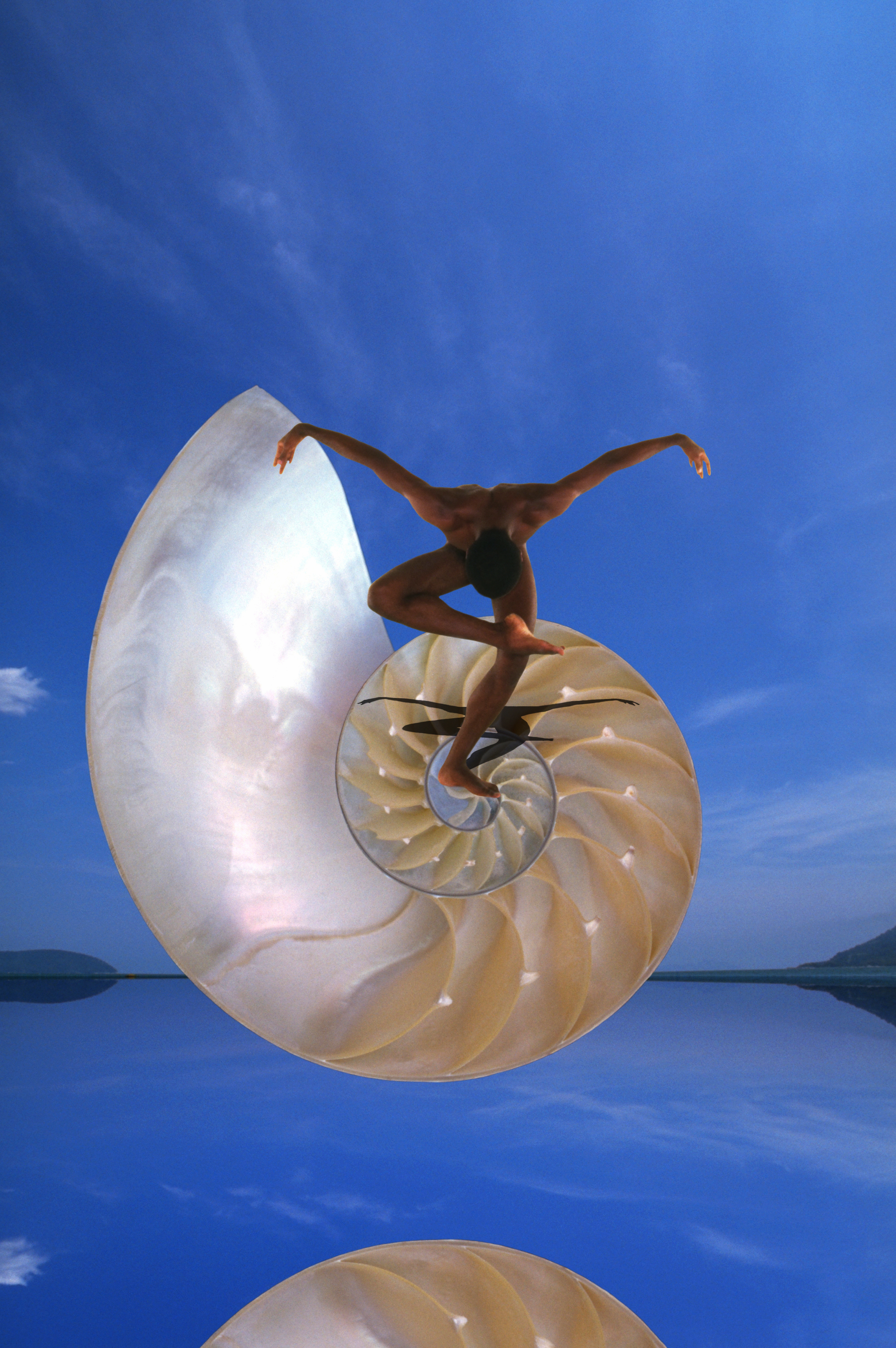
A Bowing in Art 1996

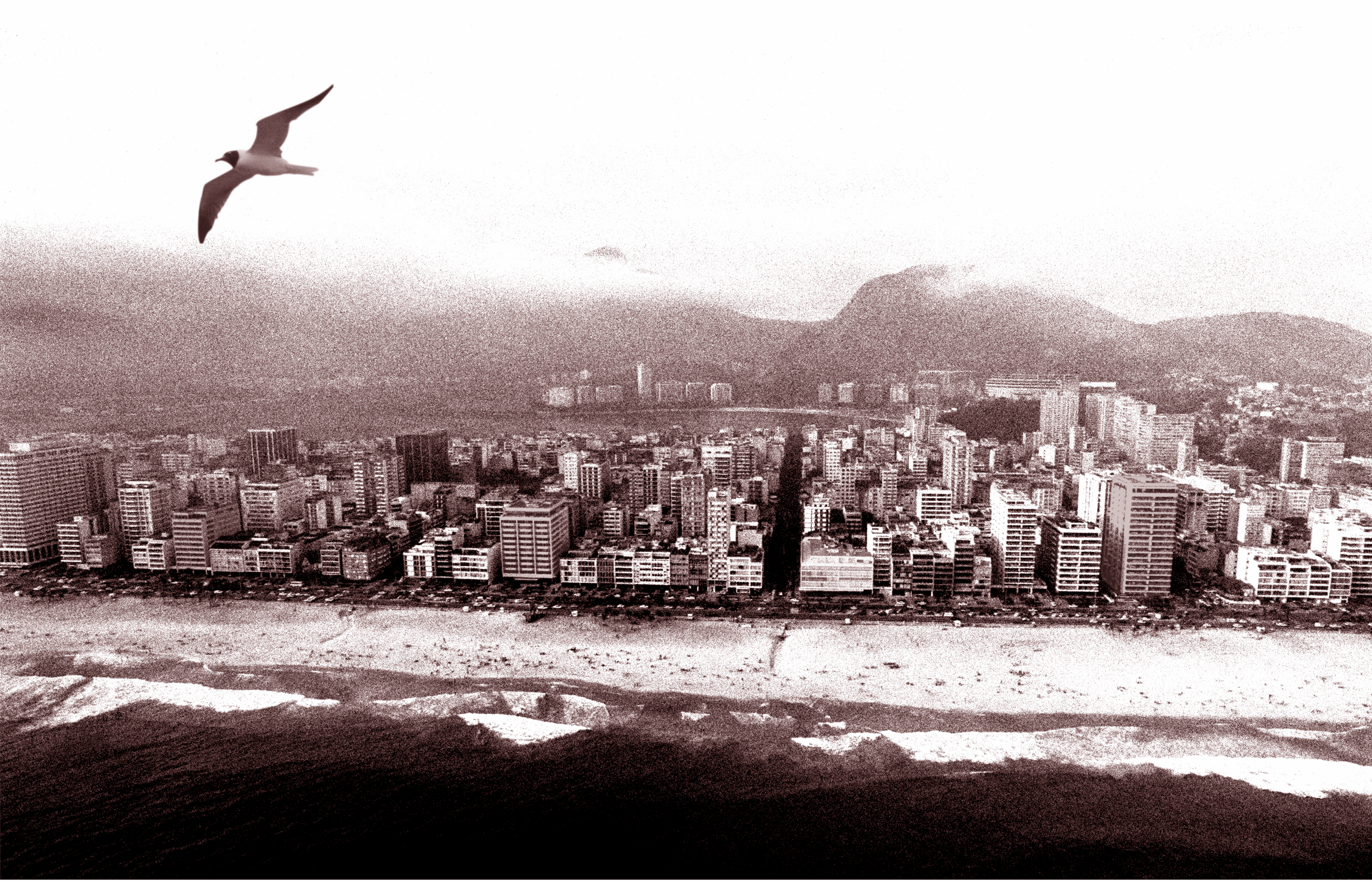
Avenida Vieira Souto, Lagoa, Rio de Janeiro, Brazil 1985

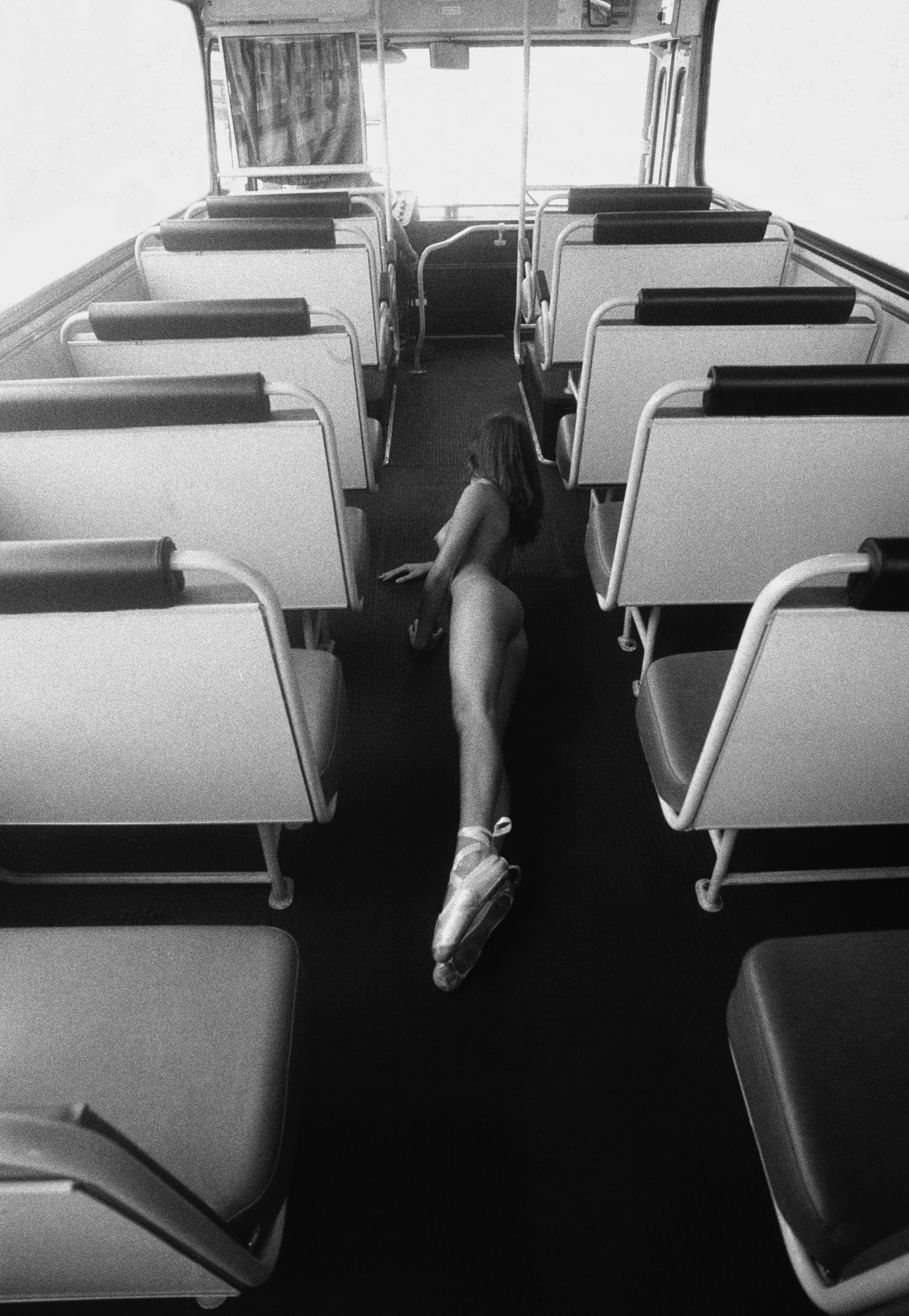
Sonho de Condutor 1985 TIF São Paulo Museum of Modern Art collection, Brazil

== Selected bibliography ==
- Robert Louit " Portifolio Revista Zoom Internacional", 1985, edição 121, pp. 26–31, France
- Daysi Peccinini – "Arte Meios Multimeios 70/80" FAAP – Projeto Video Oil,1985,(Brazil). ISBN 978-85-98864-47-1 ISBN 8598864471
- Paola Sammartano " Portifolio Revista Zoom Internacional" 1995, pp. 62–67, (Italy).
- Tadeu Chiarelli "Catalog geral do acervo do Museu de Arte Moderna de São Paulo", 2002, pp. 85–89, (Brazil).
- Coleção Joaquim Paiva, "Visões e Alumbramentos" Museum of Modern Art, Rio de Janeiro", 2002, (Brazil). ISBN 8587742248 ISBN 978-8587742247
- Eduardo Bueno "São Paulo 450 anos em 24 horas", Bueno e Bueno 2004, pp. 21–23, 197, (Brazil).
