= Kurt Heinrich Wolff =

American sociologist (1912–2003)

Kurt Heinrich Wolff (May 20, 1912 – September 14, 2003) was a German-born American sociologist. A major contributor to the sociology of knowledge and to qualitative and phenomenological approaches in sociology, he also translated from German and from French into English many important works by Georg Simmel, Emile Durkheim and Karl Mannheim. While carrying out anthropological field research in the 1940s in a small community in the southwestern United States, Wolff initially discovered, and began to articulate and to advocate, a new qualitative methodological approach for the study of human society. The approach later proved applicable in any field of inquiry or area of human endeavor. He called it "Surrender and Catch". For more than 60 years, Wolff taught and wrote about this new approach.

Karl Mannheim was Wolff's main intellectual influence, yet Wolff was certainly open to a variety of intellectual currents other than Mannheimian sociology. Wolffean thought can be traced to a number of different sources in world sociology, philosophy and anthropology. Like many Central European polymaths he was fluent in a number of languages including English, German, French, Italian and Spanish.

== Life ==
After graduating in Darmstadt, Wolff began his philosophical and sociological studies at Goethe University Frankfurt (1930–31 and 1932–33) and the Ludwig-Maximilians-Universität München (1931–32) where he studied with Karl Mannheim. As the Nazis expelled all Jews from academic positions, he and Mannheim were forced to leave. Mannheim went to London, Wolff to Italy. In Italy, Wolff learned Italian well enough in one year to be able to study at the University of Florence from 1934 to 1935 in order to obtain his Laureate (doctorate in philosophy) with a thesis titled "La Sociologia del Sapere."

Meaningful in those years was a friendship with his classmate, Aurelio Pace, the future Historian of Africa and the Joseph Pace the artist's father, who in those years helped him translate from German into Italian his doctoral thesis "Sociology of Knowledge" which Wolff discusses in 1935 with Ludovico Limentani. Until 1939 Wolff remained in Italy and with the support of his wife and his friend Pace got a job as a teacher, first in Florence and later in Camogli. Because of the fascist racial laws, Wolff and his wife Carla (née Bruck), left Italy in 1939. After a three-month stay in London, England arranged by Mannheim, Wolff immigrated to the United States. In 1945, Wolff became a United States citizen.

With financial assistance provided by the Oberlander Trust and the International Refugee Service Wolff got a position as a research assistant in sociology from 1939 to 1943 at Southern Methodist University in Texas. While there he taught an introductory course in statistics during his final year. In 1943-44 he took a Social Science Research Council Post-Doctoral Fellowship at the University of Chicago, allowing him to conduct anthropological field research in the spring and summer in New Mexico. His field work was conducted under the guidance of leading American anthropologists Robert Redfield and Sol Tax. The following year, 1944–45, he taught at Earlham College in Indiana, and in 1945 was appointed an assistant professor at Ohio State University. Wolff became an associate professor at Ohio State where he remained until 1959.

In 1959, he moved to Brandeis University where he taught until 1993. From 1964, Wolff was a Sociological Abstracts Council member and a visiting professor for one year to the University of Freiburg (1966–67). He was the first translator and divulger in English of Georg Simmel and Karl Mannheim.

From 1966 to 1972, Kurt H. Wolff was the Chairman of the Research Committee's of Sociology of Knowledge of the International Sociological Association, and from 1972 to 1979 President of the "International Society for the Sociology of Knowledge". Wolff was also an honorary member of German Society for Sociology.

In 1987, he was honored with the Medal of Johann Heinrich Merck in his hometown Darmstadt.

== Selected works ==
- A Whole, A Fragment (2002).
- What It Contains (2002).
- Soziologie in der gefährdeten Welt (1998).
- Transformation in the Writing (1995).
- Survival and Sociology (1991)
- O Loma! (1989)
- Die persönliche Geschichte eines Emigranten, in: Srubar, Ilja (Hg.), Exil, Wissenschaft, Identität. Die Emigration deutscher Sozialwissenschaftler 1933–1945, Frankfurt am Main: suhrkamp, 1988, S. 13–22 (hier auch Quelle).
- Surrender and Catch (1976).
- Trying Sociology (1974).
- Versuch zu einer Wissenssoziologie (1968).
- Hingebung und Begriff. Soziologische Essays (1968).

== Bibliography ==
- Editors (2003). "Publications of Kurt H. Wolff". Human Studies. 26: 343–352
- Maier, J. (1984). "Wolff, Kurt H.". In Bernsdorf, Wilhelm; Knospe, Horst (eds.). Internationales Soziologenlexikon. Vol. 2 (2nd ed.). Stuttgart: Enke. pp. 934f. ISBN 3-432-90702-8.
