= Theatro Municipal (Jaguariúna) =

The Teatro Municipal de Jaguariúna (Municipal Theatre), also known as Teatro Dona Zenaide, is located in the Jaguariúna's city center in the state of São Paulo, Brazil.

The building is located at Via Alfredo Bueno, 1151.

== History ==
The Municipal Theatre of Jaguariúna, since 1930, was originally the city's old cinema. After a long restoration the Theatre opened in 2008 completely renovated in a contemporary style.

== Organisation ==
The theatre has 420 seats, ramps for people with physical disabilities and a great stage and halls for contemporary art exhibitions.

The Prefecture of Jaguariuna has a free admission policy that includes art exhibitions, orchestras, choirs, ballets theater and conferences, to promote better access to and wider participation in culture.
