= Gissi =

- Comune
- Comune di Gissi
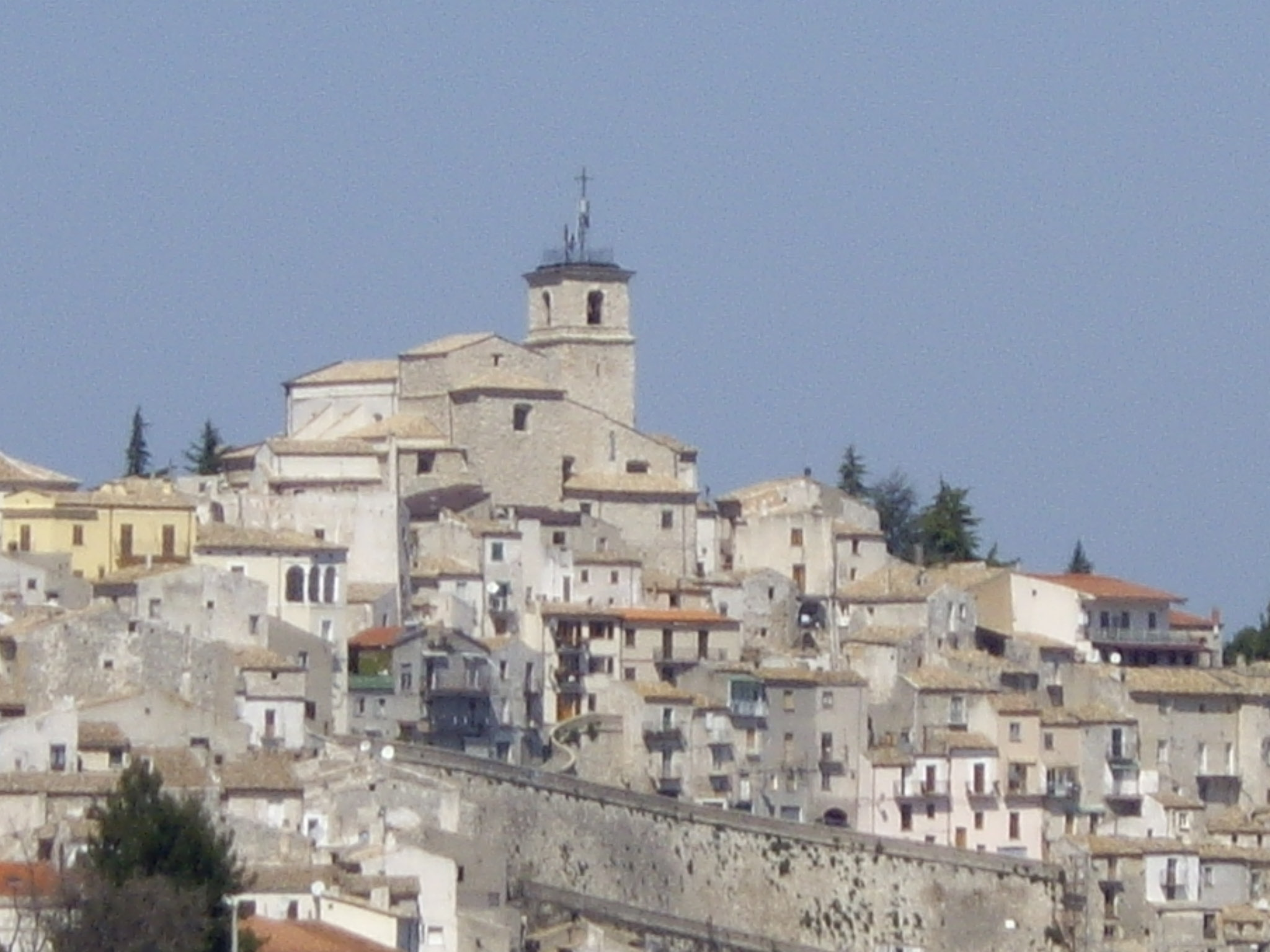

- Coat of arms

- Location within Italy Location within Abruzzo
- Coordinates: 42°1′N 14°33′E
- Country: Italy
- Region: Abruzzo
- Province: Chieti (CH)

Government
  - Mayor: Agostino Chieffo

Area
  - Total: 36 km^{2} (14 sq mi)
- Elevation: 499 m (1,637 ft)

Population (31 December 2010)
  - Total: 3,006
  - Density: 84/km^{2} (220/sq mi)
- Demonym: Gissani
- Time zone: UTC+1 (CET)
  - Summer (DST): UTC+2 (CEST)
- Postal code: 66052
- Dialing code: 0873
- Patron saint: St. Bernardino
- Saint day: 20 May
- Website: Official website

Gissi (Abruzzese: Ìsce) is a town and comune located in the Province of Chieti, Abruzzo, Italy.

It is bordered by two tributaries of the Sinello River and is surrounded by vineyards and olive groves.

== History ==
Gissi has been populated since prehistoric times. In the 12th century it was under the influence of the D'Avalos family.

== Main sights ==
The Palazzo Carunchio and the ruins of the Castle are exemplary of the town's buildings, balconies, and alleys. Built in the 19th century, the Palazzo Carunchio now serves as the Town Hall, and houses the town's administrative offices. The town has other fine examples of palazzi from the 18th and 19th centuries, adorned with fine architectural details. Also notable is that many Gissi homes are covered with gesso, a material obtained from nearby caves and hills.

The Church of Santa Maria Assunta is Gissi's oldest church, which was remodeled in 1955. Inside, it houses silver crosses from the Neapolitan School dating to the 17th and 18th centuries, a 17th-century wooden statue of Saint Pamphilus, and a wooden cross from the late 12th. Its ceiling contains a reproduction of the Annunciation attributed to Guido Reni, and its 16th century wooden organ is carved and gilded with gold. The church also has two chapels dedicated to the Immaculate Conception and Sacred Heart.

Another church is the Cappella di Santa Lucia located in La Pineta, a pine tree park which affords views of the surrounding countryside, including the Adriatic Sea.

== Culture ==
Gissi is home to a variety of feasts and festivals, many of which are religious feasts in celebration of saints. These include the 20 May feast of St. Bernardino of Siena, who is buried at L'Aquila in the cathedral dedicated in his name. Other feasts include the Feast of St. Lucy on August 20 and the Feast of St. Roch on August 19.

== People ==
- Remo Gaspari (1921–2011), a Christian Democrat politician
