= Ferruccio Ferrazzi =

Italian painter and sculptor (1891–1978)

Ferruccio Ferrazzi (15 March 1891 – 8 December 1978 in Rome) was an Italian painter and sculptor, as well as a professor at Accademia di Belle Arti of Rome.)

== Life ==
Born in Rome, Ferrazzi was the eldest son of the sculptor Stanislao Ferrazzi. In 1904, he was trained in the studio of Francesco Bergamini, a former pupil of Michele Cammarano. The following year he attended the Scuola Libera del Nudo and at the Accademia di Francia. He first exhibited at the 1907 Exhibition (LXXVII Esposizione Internazionale di Belle Arti) in Rome. In 1910, he won a scholarship to the Instituto Catel which allowed him to take up art as a career.

In 1913, he exhibited Genetrix at the First Roman Secession Exhibition (Prima Esposizione internazionale d'arte della Secessione Romana). In December, he was granted the national art pension, which gave him financial security and allowed him to set up a studio in Via Ripetta. A visit to the Louvre in Paris revealed his interest in Georges Seurat whose style was similar to his own.

During this period he alternated futurist works, such as the first draft of Family Characters, with others of Cézannian inspiration. It was at the Institute of Music between 1915 and 1916, when the time came for his first solo exhibition, hosted at the LXXXV Exhibition Society of Amateurs and Connoisseurs of Fine Arts and a summa of the different tendencies operating in the artist. In fact, we have a Michelangelo-esque Pietà, which is flanked by a figurative production attracted to childhood landscapes and portraits (including that of Matilde Festa, who would become the wife of the famous architect Marcello Piacentini), but also an early hint of hallucinatory painting, as well as futurist works to be ascribed mainly to the needs of a young author in the cultural temperament of the moment. Also appearing is the prism, that object loaded with meanings that will have an increasing weight in Ferrazzi's career.

In 1926, he became a professor at the Accademia di San Luca. The same year he was the first Italian to win the Carnegie Prize. In the spring of 1933, he was elected to the Italian Academy. After the war, he created mainly religious works, both paintings and sculptures. In the 1950s, he spent most of his time at the Casa di Santo Stefano in Monte Argentario where he created his ambient sculpture Il Teatro della Vita (The Theatre of Life).

After taking an early interest in Futurism, Ferrazzi finally moved back to Neoclassicism. He is remembered in particular for his interest in encaustic painting which he used in his murals.

Giovanni Stradone was his pupil.
