= Giovanni Omiccioli =

Italian painter

- Born: 25 February 1901; Rome, Italy
- Died: 1 March 1975 (aged 74); Rome, Italy
- Education: Scuola Romana
- Known for: Painting
- Notable work: Partita di calcio in periferia, (Soccer game in the suburbs, 1949); Pastore con capretta (Shepherd with goat)
- Movement: Contemporary
- Awards: Marzotto Prize

Giovanni Omiccioli (25 February 1901 – 1 March 1975) was an Italian painter belonging to the modern movement of the Scuola romana (Roman School), with a dynamic paintwork representing soccer games and sports scenes.

== Biography ==
Having joined the Scuola Romana movement, in 1928, Omiccioli collaborated especially with Mario Mafai and Antonietta Raphael, as well as with Scipione and Raffaele Frumenti. His pictorial activity started in 1934 and a few years afterwards, he exhibited work at the IV Mostra del Sindacato Fascista (1937) within the Fine Art circle. In the same period he held his personal expo at Apollo Gallery in Rome.

Omiccioli was also active in politics and, with Mario Mafai, Guttuso and Afro Basaldella, he created the first header of the Italian communist newspaper L’Unità in 1945, immediately after the Italian Liberazione. During the same year he exhibited at the I Mostra dell'Arte against barbarism, promoted by this newspaper at the Gallery of Rome with catalogue by Antonello Trombadori, presenting a dramatic political painting by the title La fucilazione di Bruno Buozzi (The Fusillading of Bruno Buozzi).

After winning an award at the Marzotto Prize Convention, with Il Pastore con la capretta (Shepherd with small goat), Omiccioli exhibited at many important arts centres: especially noticeable are his anthological displays at the Hermitage of Leningrad, his personal at the La Medusa Modern Gallery of Naples, and in the 1950s his participation in exhibitions at Pittsburgh, Boston, and Tokyo. He also took part in a travelling exhibition around the Scandinavian countries organised by the Italian Art Club, as well as displaying some paintings at the various Rome Quadriennales of 1955, 1959 e poi del 1966, and at the Venetian Biennales of 1952, 1954, 1956. In 1959 he also presents a religious painting on hardboard, Cristo crocifisso (Crucified Christ), at the VIII Biennale d’Arte Sacra in Bologna. During the 1960s, Omiccioli exhibits at three Figurative Arts Reviews in Rome and Lazio (1961, 1963, 1965) and at the VI Biennale of Rome in 1968. Vaporous and tender, and yet always springing from an unchangeably intense love for nature and man, his palette of colours give a soft breath of light and a suggestive atmosphere to his whole artistic production.

== Awards ==
- Marzotto Prize

== See also ==
- Scuola Romana
- Expressionism
- Soccer

== Exhibitions ==
- Acqueforti di Omiccioli, Galleria Astrolabio, Rome 1969
- Omiccioli, Palazzo Barberini, Rome, 1978
- Omiccioli, Castel Sant’Angelo Rome, 1986.

== Bibliography ==
- (in Italian) S. Favre, Civiltà Arte Sport, Città di Castello, 1969, p. 477
- (in Italian) F. Ceriotto, Omiccioli, Verona, 1971, reprs. p. 43
- (in Italian) G. Pellegrini, Omiccioli, cat. mostra, Rome, 1977, cover and pp. 55–56
- (in Italian) C. Giacomozzi, Omiccioli, cat. mostra, Rome, 1986, ripr. n.24, p. 32
