= Boncompagni Ludovisi Decorative Art Museum =

Museo Boncompagni Ludovisi per le arti decorative
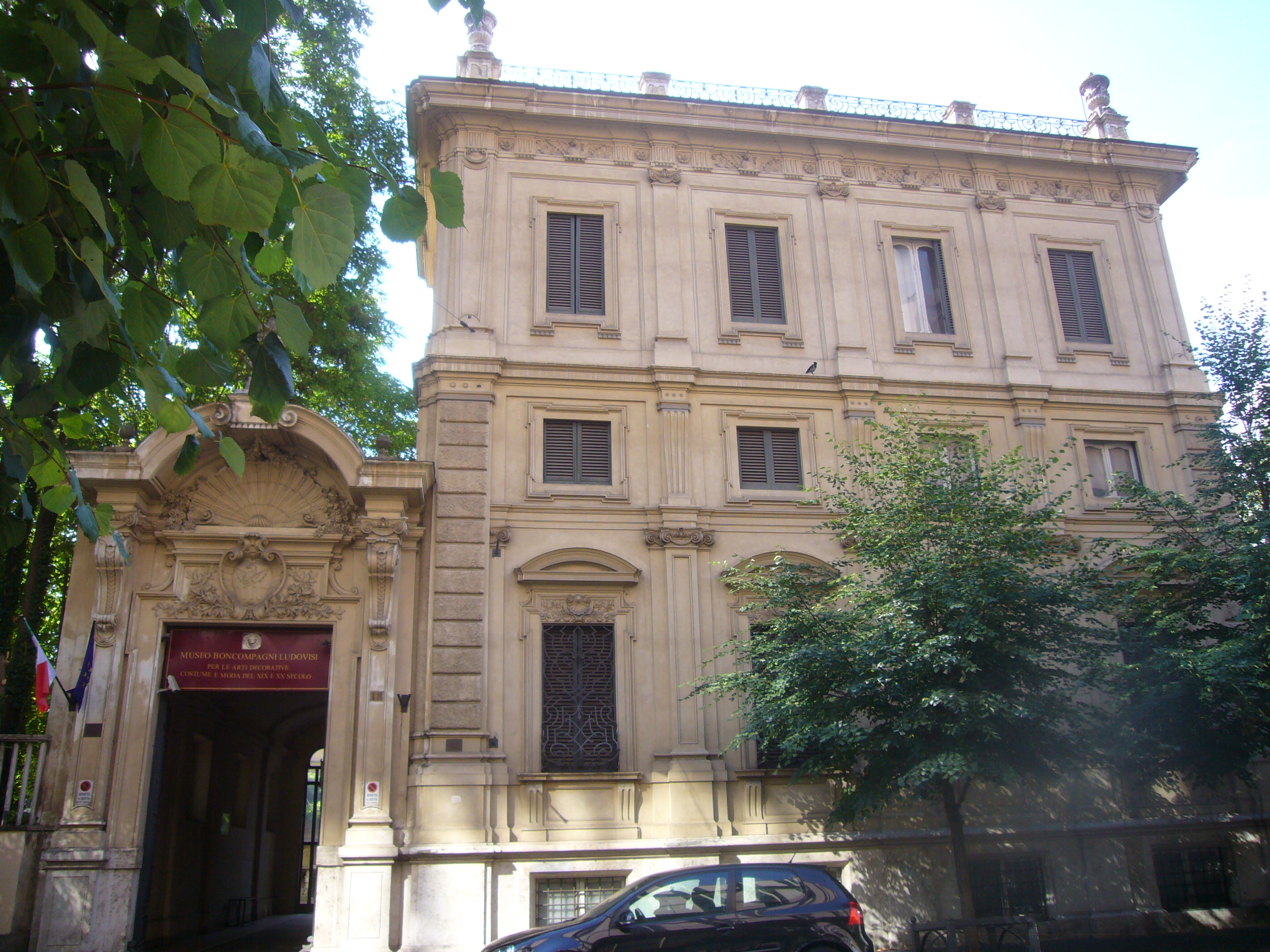
- Click on the map for a fullscreen view
- Established: 1995
- Location: Rome
- Coordinates: 41°54′31″N 12°29′43″E
- Type: museum of 19th and 20th century art
- Website: www.museoboncompagni.beniculturali.it

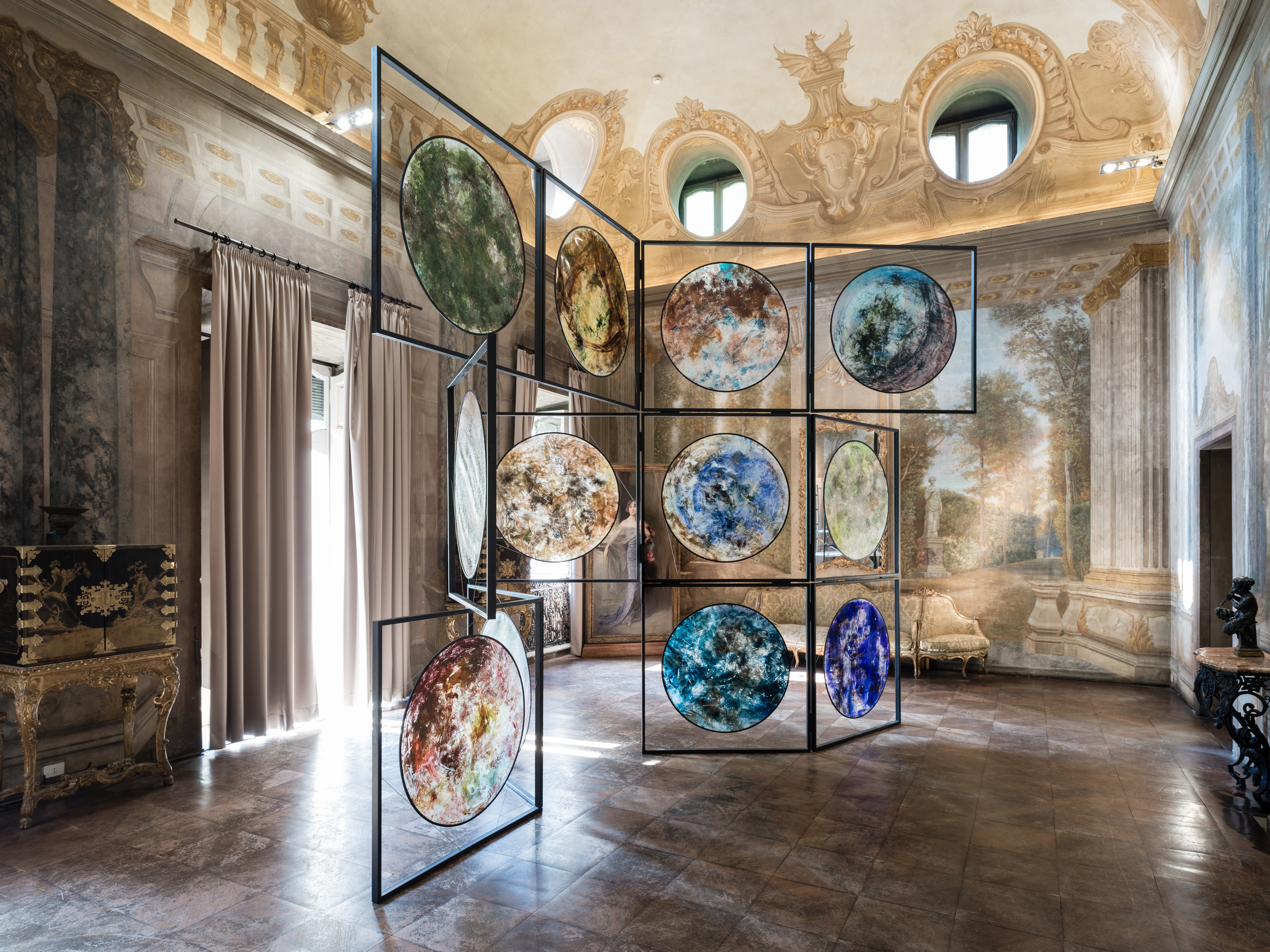
Temporary exhibition "After The Tribes" by Beverly Barkat in the ballroom of the villa (2018)

Boncompagni Ludovisi Decorative Arts Museum (Museo Boncompagni Ludovisi per le arti decorative, often abbreviated as the Museo Boncompagni), Rome, is the Decorative Arts Museum of the National Gallery of Modern Art of Rome. The Museum is located at Via Boncompagni, 18, near the elegant and historical Via Veneto.

== History ==
Opened in 1995 to promote and develop the Italian decorative arts, costume and fashion, Boncompagni Ludovisi Museum is located in the Villino Boncompagni, an Art Nouveau villa, built in the early years of the twentieth century. The “Villino Boncompagni” was donated in 1972 by the princess Blanceflor de Bildt Boncompagni to the Italian Republic to promote art and culture. After the restoration of the building, carried out in the eighties, the “Villino” was given by the Ministero dei beni e delle attività culturali e del turismo, MiBACT (Italian Ministry for Cultural Heritage) at the National Gallery of Modern and Contemporary Art of Rome.

Liberty style artists Galileo Chini (1873 – 1956) and Vittorio Zecchin (1878 – 1947) created a number of panels in 1914 for the Venice Hotel Terminus called "La Primavera" and "Mille e una notte", which were influenced by Gustav Klimt's style who exhibited at the 1910 Venice Biennale. These were later exhibited in the museum.

== Organization ==
Boncompagni Ludovisi Museum collects paintings, sculptures, ceramics and original furnishings of the “Villino Boncompagni” and works of art coming from the Galleria Nazionale d'Arte Moderna of Rome. It houses about eight hundred pieces of clothing and fashion accessories illustrating Italian fashion history and showing the debut of the Italian fashion, at the beginning of the 1900 to reach its extreme results of recent decades.

The Museum also hosts temporary cultural and contemporary art exhibitions.

== Exhibitions ==
- Tristano di Robilant. (2007)
- La danza fotografica da Luciano Usai. (2008)
- Pino Procopio, Ulisse, Scene da un viaggio. (2008)
- Arnaldo Ginna Futurista. (2009)
- Lo zoo di Pinocchio. Galleria di ritratti dei personaggi-animali. Disegni di Filippo Sassoli. (2009)
- Rolando Monti - Dal tonalismo all'astrazione lirica. (2010)
- Fernanda Gattinoni. Moda e stelle ai tempi della Hollywood sul Tevere. (2011)
- Falsi ma Belli. (2011)
- Palma Bucarelli. La Palma della bellezza. (2012)
- Zecchin - Cambellotti e Le Mille e una notte. (2013)
- Joseph Pace, L'Eva Futura. (2014)
- Lydia Predominato, Una via d'uscita per un cuore costretto. (2014)
- Libri d'Artista, L'Arte da Leggere. (2021)
- Direzione dei Musei statali di Roma. Libri d'Artista, L'Arte da Leggere. (2021)
- Il Gioiello nella Moda e nell'Arte e Libro d'artista di Joseph Pace, Flowers#2. (2022)

Preceded by Parco degli Acquedotti	Landmarks of Rome; Boncompagni Ludovisi Decorative Art Museum	Succeeded by Capitoline Museums
