= Silliness =

Ludicrous behaviour

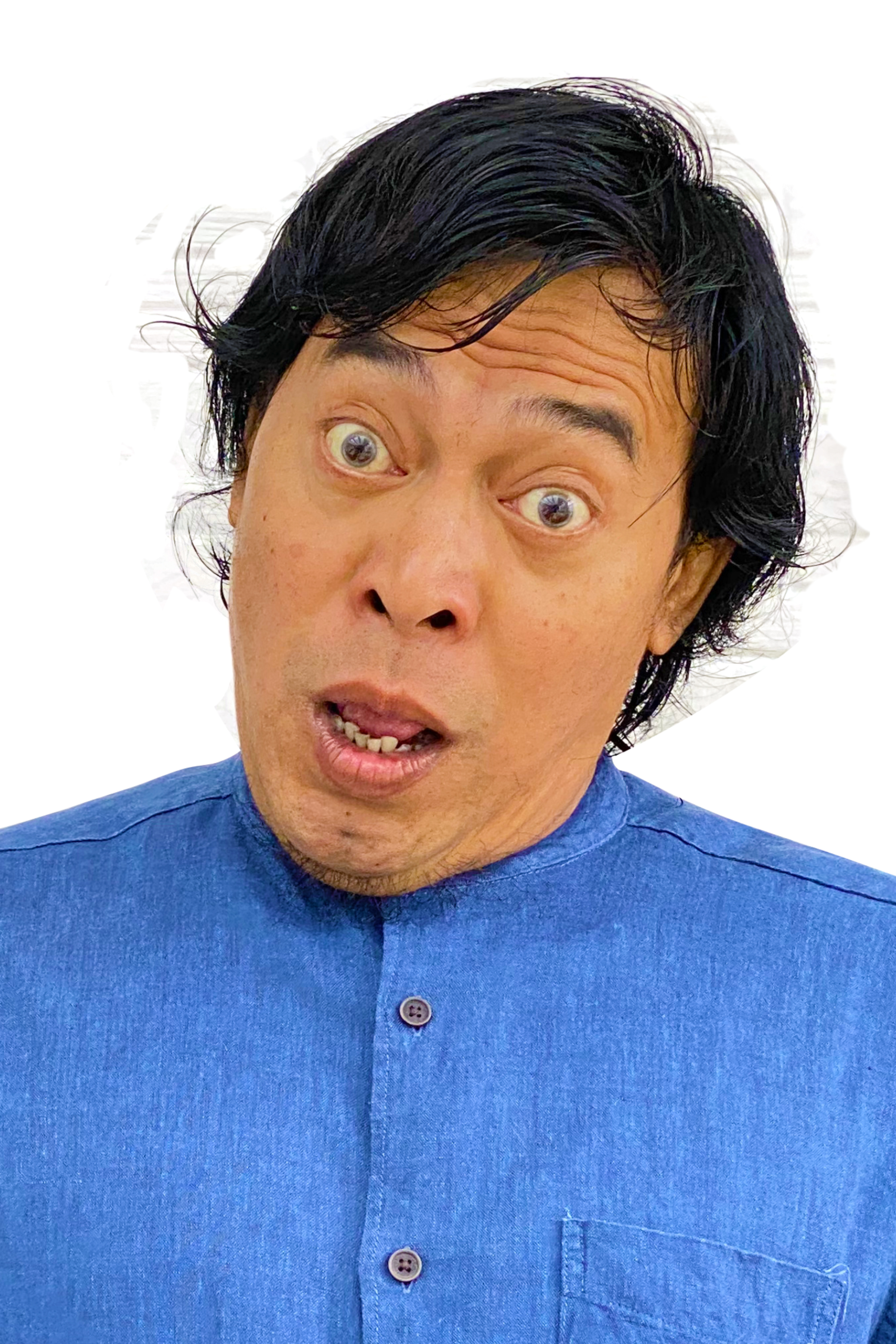
Official Indonesian regional representative candidate portrait of Komeng—who is also a comedian—featuring a silly face

Silliness is defined as engaging in "a ludicrous folly", showing a "lack of good sense or judgment", or "the condition of being frivolous, trivial, or superficial". In television, film, and the circus, portrayals of silliness such as exaggerated, funny behavior are used to amuse audiences. Portrayals of silliness, provided by clowns and jesters, are also used to lift the spirits of people in hospitals.

In "The Art of Roughhousing", Anthony DeBenedet and Larry Cohen argue that "wild play" between a child and a parent can foster "joy, love and a deeper connection"; among the actions they suggest is for the parent to be silly and pretend to fall over.

Michael Christianson from New York’s Big Apple Circus "became so interested in the healing qualities of physical comedy that he quit his job"..."to teach jesters, clowns and comedians how to connect with hospital patients through his Clown Care Unit." A doctor named Patch Adams "...leads a merry band of mirth makers on trips around the world to locations of crisis or suffering in order to serve up some levity and healing."

In the United States and Mexico, the US practical joke group Improv Everywhere has created an 'international celebration of silliness' by asking commuters to board the New York and Mexico City subways without trousers on a specific day.

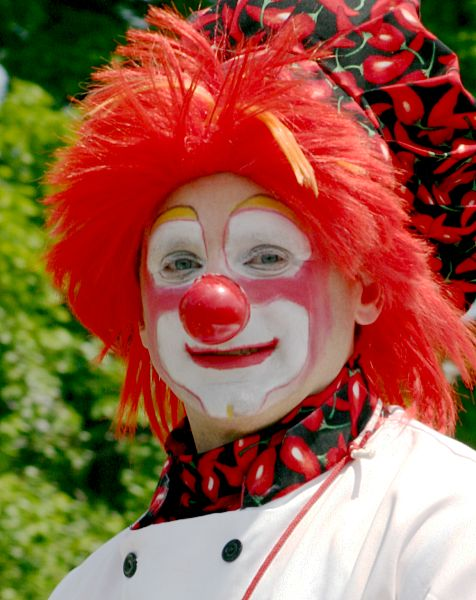
A clown with "happy face" painting

In the circus, one of the roles that clowns play is engaging in silliness. When clowning is taught, the different components of silliness include "funny ways of speaking to make people laugh", making "silly face[s] and sound[s]", engaging in "funny ways of moving, and play[ing] with extreme emotions such as pretending to laugh and cry". In Canada, the Northern Arts and Cultural Centre held a Children's Festival of Silliness in January 2012.

== See also ==
- Absurdity
- Comedy
- Foolishness
- Silly Billy – Type of clown in 19th-century England
- The Ministry of Silly Walks – Monty Python sketch
- Stupidity
