= Jester =

Medieval European entertainer

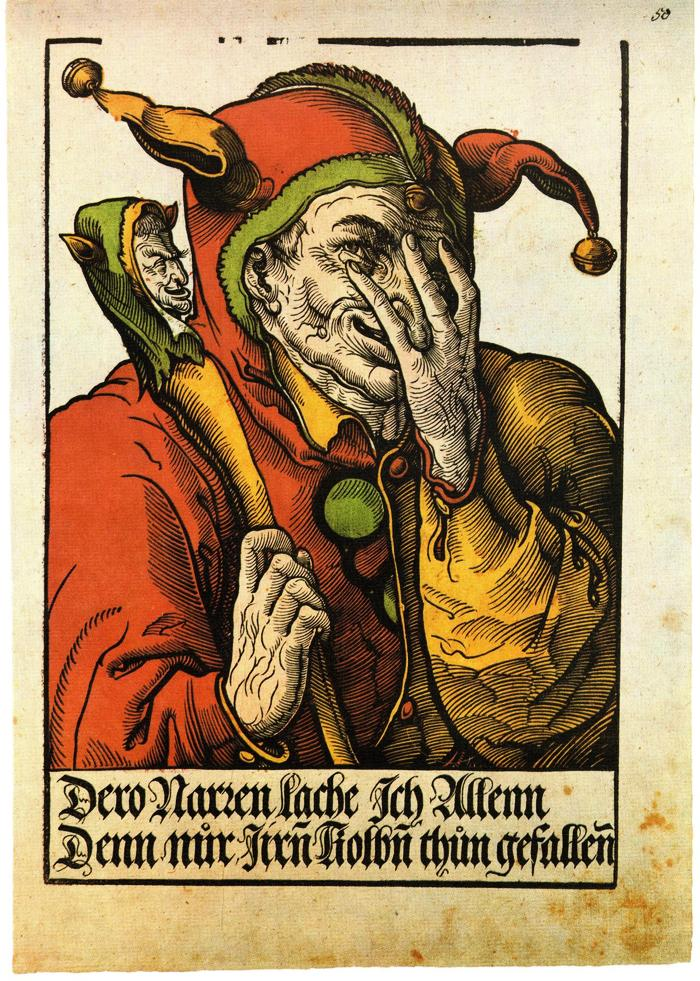
- Woodcut of a jester by Heinrich Vogtherr the Younger, c. 1540

A jester, also known as joker, court jester, or fool, was a member of the household of a nobleman or a monarch kept to entertain guests at the royal court. Jesters were also travelling performers who entertained common folk at fairs and town markets, and the discipline continues into the modern day, where jesters perform at historical-themed events. Jester-like figures were common throughout the world, including ancient Rome, China, Persia, the Aztec Empire and Medieval Europe.

During the post-classical and Renaissance eras, jesters are often thought to have worn brightly coloured clothes and eccentric hats in a motley pattern. Jesters entertained with a wide variety of skills: principal among them were song, music, and storytelling, but many also employed acrobatics, juggling, telling jokes (such as puns and imitation), and performing magic tricks. Much of the entertainment was performed in a comic style. Many jesters made contemporary jokes in word or song about people or events well known to their audiences.

== Etymology ==
The modern use of the English word jester did not come into use until the mid-16th century, during Tudor times. This modern term derives from the older form gestour, or jestour, originally from French meaning 'storyteller' or 'minstrel'. Other earlier terms included fol, disour, buffoon, and bourder. These terms described entertainers who differed in their skills and performances but who all shared many similarities in their role as comedic performers for their audiences.

== History ==
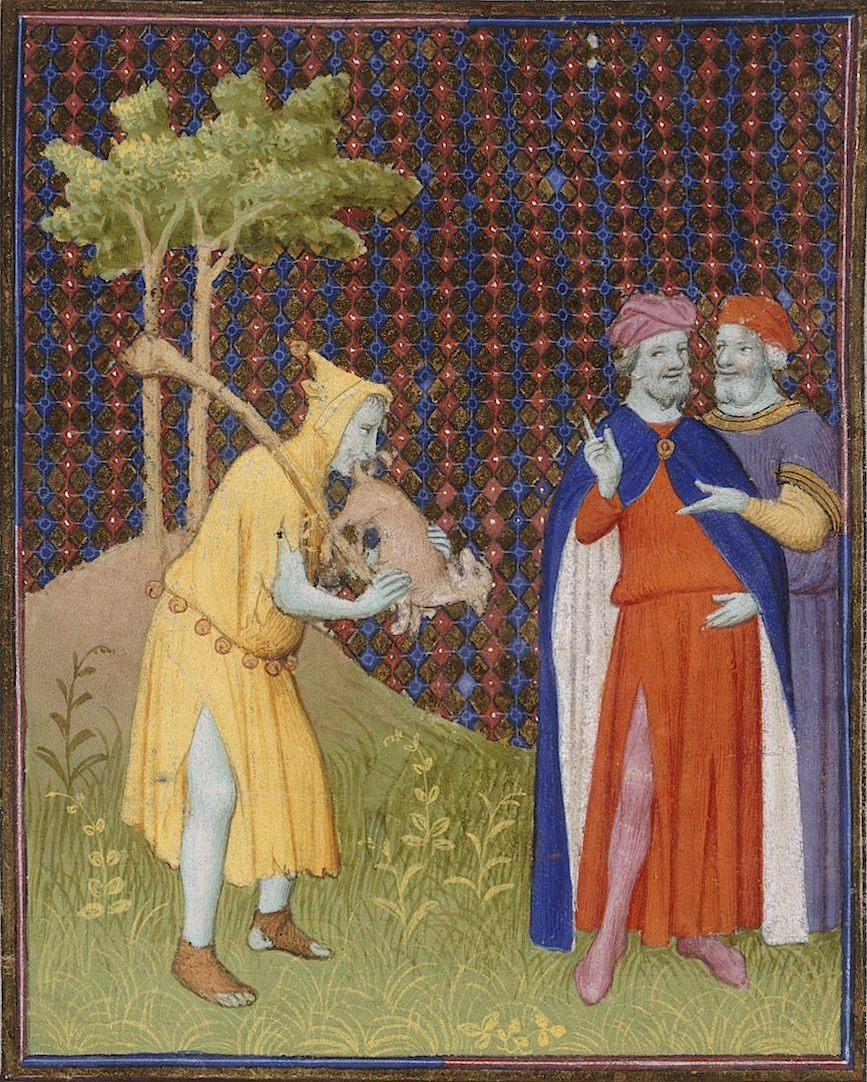
1404–1425, France. Two men smile at a jester's act, appearing to use a dog for a bagpipe.

Jester-like figures have been common throughout the world. They were known in China, Persia, India and the Aztec empire.

=== China ===
In ancient China, court entertainers known as you (優), including performers described as paiyou (俳優), served rulers through music, comic performances, impersonation and witty speech. Some used humour to offer indirect criticism of their rulers, a practice associated with fengjian (諷諫, indirect remonstrance).

An important early account appears in the Records of the Grand Historian (Shiji), compiled by Sima Qian during the Han dynasty. Its chapter 126, Huaji liezhuan (滑稽列傳), commonly translated as "Biographies of Jesters" or "Traditions of Witty Remonstrants", recounts anecdotes involving figures such as Chunyu Kun, You Meng and You Zhan. The chapter has been studied both as evidence for court entertainment in early China and as an example of humour employed in political persuasion.

One anecdote concerns You Meng, an entertainer at the court of King Zhuang of Chu. According to the Shiji, when the king intended to bury a favourite horse with the honours accorded to a high-ranking official, You Meng responded by proposing even more extravagant funeral arrangements. His exaggerated praise exposed the absurdity of the decision and persuaded the king to abandon the plan. The episode illustrates the use of comic exaggeration as a form of indirect remonstrance.

=== Balatrones ===
In ancient Rome, a balatro ([ˈba.la.troː]) was a professional jester or buffoon. Balatrones were paid for their jests, and the tables of the wealthy were generally open to them for the sake of the amusement they afforded.

There are various theories about the origin of the term. In Horace, Balatro is used as a proper name: Servilius Balatro. An old scholiast derives the common word balatro from the proper name, suggesting that buffoons were called balatrones because Servilius Balatro was a buffoon, though others have since objected to this account. Festus derives the word from blatea, and supposes buffoons to have been called balatrones because they were dirty fellows, covered with spots of mud (blateae) from walking. Another writer suggests a derivation from barathrum, because they, so to speak, carried their jesting to market, even into the very depth (barathrum) of the shambles (barathrum macelli) Balatro may be connected with balare, "to bleat like a sheep", and hence, to speak sillily. Others have suggested a connection with blatero, a busy-body.

=== English royal court jesters ===
Many royal courts throughout English royal history employed entertainers and most had professional fools, sometimes called "licensed fools". Fool Societies, or groups of nomadic entertainers, were often hired to perform acrobatics and juggling.

Jesters were also occasionally used as psychological warfare. Jesters would ride in front of their troops, provoke or mock the enemy, and even serve as messengers. They played an important part in raising their own army's spirits by singing songs and reciting stories.

Henry VIII employed a jester named Will Sommers. His daughter Mary I was entertained by Jane Foole.

During the reigns of Elizabeth I and James I, William Shakespeare wrote his plays and performed with his theatre company the Lord Chamberlain's Men (later called the King's Men). Clowns and jesters were featured in Shakespeare's plays, and the company's expert on jesting was Robert Armin, author of the book Foole upon Foole. In Shakespeare's Twelfth Night, Feste the jester is described as "wise enough to play the fool".

In Scotland, Mary, Queen of Scots, had a jester called Nichola. Her son, King James VI, employed a jester called Archibald Armstrong. During his lifetime Armstrong was given great honours at court. He was eventually thrown out of the King's employment when he over-reached and insulted too many influential people. Even after his disgrace, books telling of his jests were sold in London streets. He held some influence at court still in the reign of Charles I and estates of land in Ireland. Anne of Denmark had a Scottish jester called Tom Durie. Charles I later employed a jester called Jeffrey Hudson who was very popular and loyal. Jeffrey Hudson had the title of "Royal Dwarf" because he was short of stature. One of his jests was to be presented hidden in a giant pie from which he would leap out. Hudson fought on the Royalist side in the English Civil War. A third jester associated with Charles I was called Muckle John.

=== Jester's privilege ===
Jester's privilege is the ability and right of a jester to talk and mock freely without being punished. As an acknowledgement of this right, the court jester had symbols denoting their status and protection under the law. The crown (cap and bells) and sceptre (marotte) mirrored the royal crown and sceptre wielded by a monarch.

Martin Luther used jest in many of his criticisms against the Catholic Church. In the introduction to his To the Christian Nobility of the German Nation, he calls himself a court jester, and, later in the text, he explicitly invokes the jester's privilege when saying that monks should break their chastity vows.

== Political significance ==
Jesters could give bad news to the King that no one else would dare deliver. In 1340, when the English navy destroyed a French fleet at the Battle of Sluys, Philip VI of France's jester told him the English sailors "don't even have the guts to jump into the water like our brave French".

=== End of tradition ===
After the Restoration, Charles II did not reinstate the tradition of the court jester, but he did greatly patronise the theatre and proto-music hall entertainments, especially favouring the work of Thomas Killigrew. Though not officially a jester, Samuel Pepys records being told that Killigrew "hath a fee out of the Wardrobe for cap and bells, under the title of the King's Foole or jester".

In the 18th century, jesters had died out except in Russia, Spain, and Germany. In France and Italy, travelling groups of jesters performed plays featuring stylised characters in a form of theatre called the commedia dell'arte. A version of this passed into British folk tradition in the form of a puppet show, Punch and Judy. In France the tradition of the court jester ended with the abolition of the monarchy in the French Revolution.

In 2015, the town of Conwy in North Wales appointed Russel Erwood (aka Erwyd le Fol) as the official resident jester of the town and its people, a post that had been vacant since 1295.

=== Other countries ===
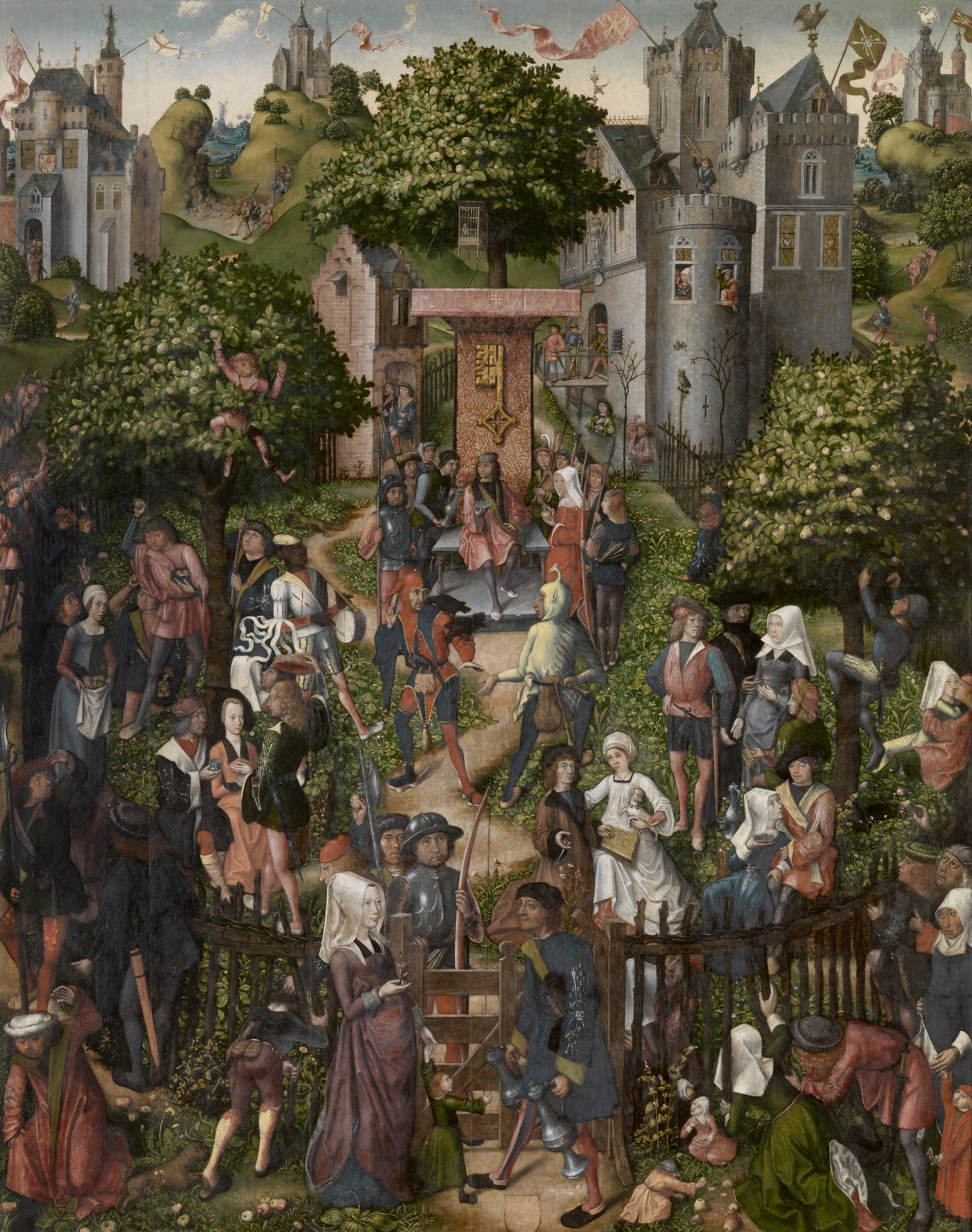
Festival of the Archers. Master of Frankfurt, 1493. Two jesters are depicted in the centre of the picture.

Poland's most famous court jester was Stańczyk (c. 1480–1560), whose jokes were usually related to political matters, and who later became a historical symbol for Poles.

In 2004 English Heritage appointed Nigel Roder ("Kester the Jester") as the State Jester for England, the first since Muckle John 355 years previously. However, following an objection by the National Guild of Jesters, English Heritage accepted they were not authorised to grant such a title. Roder was succeeded as "Heritage Jester" by Pete Cooper ("Peterkin the Fool").

In Germany, Till Eulenspiegel is a folkloric hero dating back to medieval times and ruling each year over Fasching or Carnival time, mocking politicians and public figures of power and authority with political satire like a modern-day court jester. He holds a mirror to make us aware of our times (Zeitgeist), and his sceptre, his "bauble", or marotte, is the symbol of his power.

In 17th century Spain, dwarves, often with deformities, were employed as buffoons to entertain the king and his family, especially the children. In Diego Velázquez's painting Las Meninas two dwarfs are included: Maria Bárbola, a female dwarf from Germany with hydrocephalus, and Nicolasito Portusato from Italy. Mari Bárbola can also be seen in a later portrait of princess Margarita Teresa in mourning by Juan Bautista Martinez del Mazo. There are other paintings by Velázquez that include court dwarves such as Prince Balthasar Charles with a Dwarf.

During the Renaissance Papacy, the Papal court in Rome had a court jester, similar to the secular courts of the time. Pope Pius V dismissed the court Jester, and no later Pope employed one.

In Japan from the 13th to 18th centuries, the taikomochi, a kind of male geisha, attended the feudal lords (daimyōs). They entertained mostly through dancing and storytelling, and were at times counted on for strategic advice. By the 16th century they fought alongside their lord in battle in addition to their other duties. In Akira Kurosawa's 1985 film Ran with Sengoku era setting, Kyoami is a Shakespearean fool character, the jester of Hidetora. He is inspired by the Fool in King Lear.

Tonga was the first royal court to appoint a court jester in the 20th century; Taufa'ahau Tupou IV, the King of Tonga, appointed JD Bogdanoff to that role in 1999. Bogdanoff was later embroiled in a financial scandal.

In many Sanskrit Indian texts such as the Abhijnanashakuntalam, Vidushakas are a role that may be compared to European jesters. In the Kamasutra, a Vidushaka, also known as a Vaihasaka, is defined as a beloved jester trusted by everyone. This character is somewhat skilled in the arts but is primarily known for provoking laughter. The Vidūṣaka is also detailed in the Nāṭyaśāstra. In the theatres, his character is often depicted as dwarfish, hunch-backed, having large teeth and tawny eyes. He wears makeup showing a shaven head or a crow's foot pattern imprint on his head. He is a clever confidant who observes and imitates all types of people, uses witty speech to reveal secrets that no one else dares to venture, delivers criticism to even kings through humor so that no one gets offended, maintains good relationship with women and entertains the court.

The root of the word "fool" is from the Latin follis, which means "bag of wind" or bellows or that which contains air or breath.

=== In fiction ===
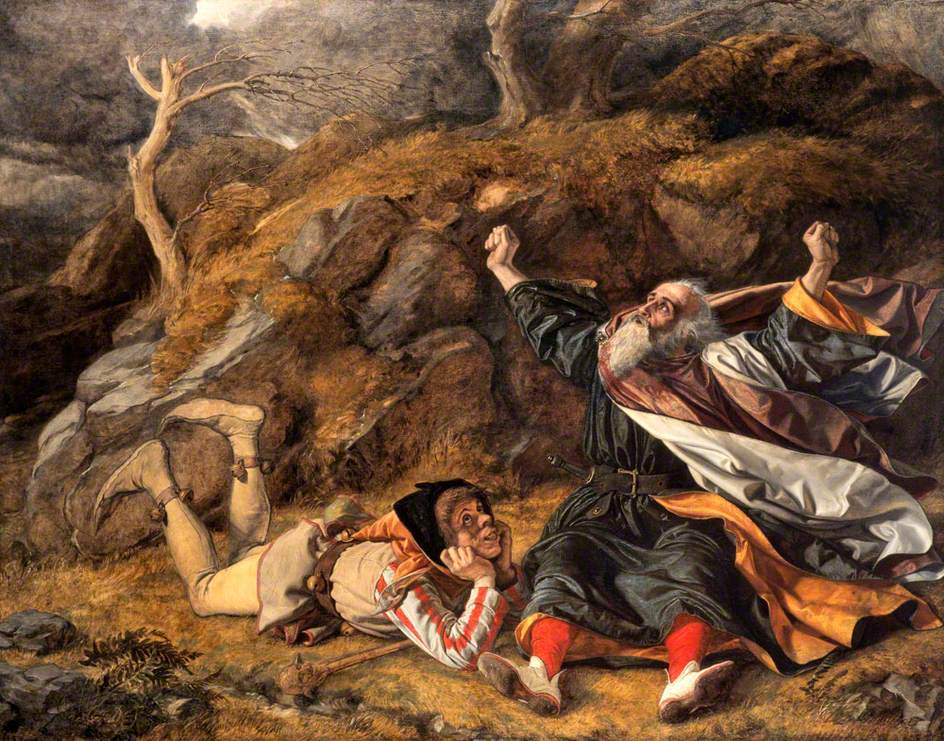
King Lear and the Fool in the Storm by William Dyce

The jester is often associated with honesty. In Shakespeare's King Lear, the court jester delivers insight and advice to the monarch. He takes advantage of his license to speak frankly, dispensing astute observations and highlighting the folly of the monarch. The irony is that a man of higher status could dispense the same advice and find himself jailed or executed; only from his position as the lowest member of the court can the jester serve as the monarch's most useful adviser.

The Shakespearean fool is a recurring character type in the works of William Shakespeare. Shakespearean fools are usually clever peasants or commoners that use their wits to outdo people of higher social standing. In this sense, they are very similar to the real fools, and jesters of the time, but their characteristics are greatly heightened for theatrical effect. The "groundlings" (theatre-goers who were too poor to pay for seats and thus stood on the 'ground' in the front by the stage) that frequented the Globe Theatre were more likely to be drawn to these Shakespearean fools. However they were also favoured by the nobility. Most notably, Queen Elizabeth I was a great admirer of the popular actor who portrayed fools, Richard Tarlton. For Shakespeare himself, however, actor Robert Armin may have proved vital to the cultivation of the fool character in his many plays.

=== In tarot ===
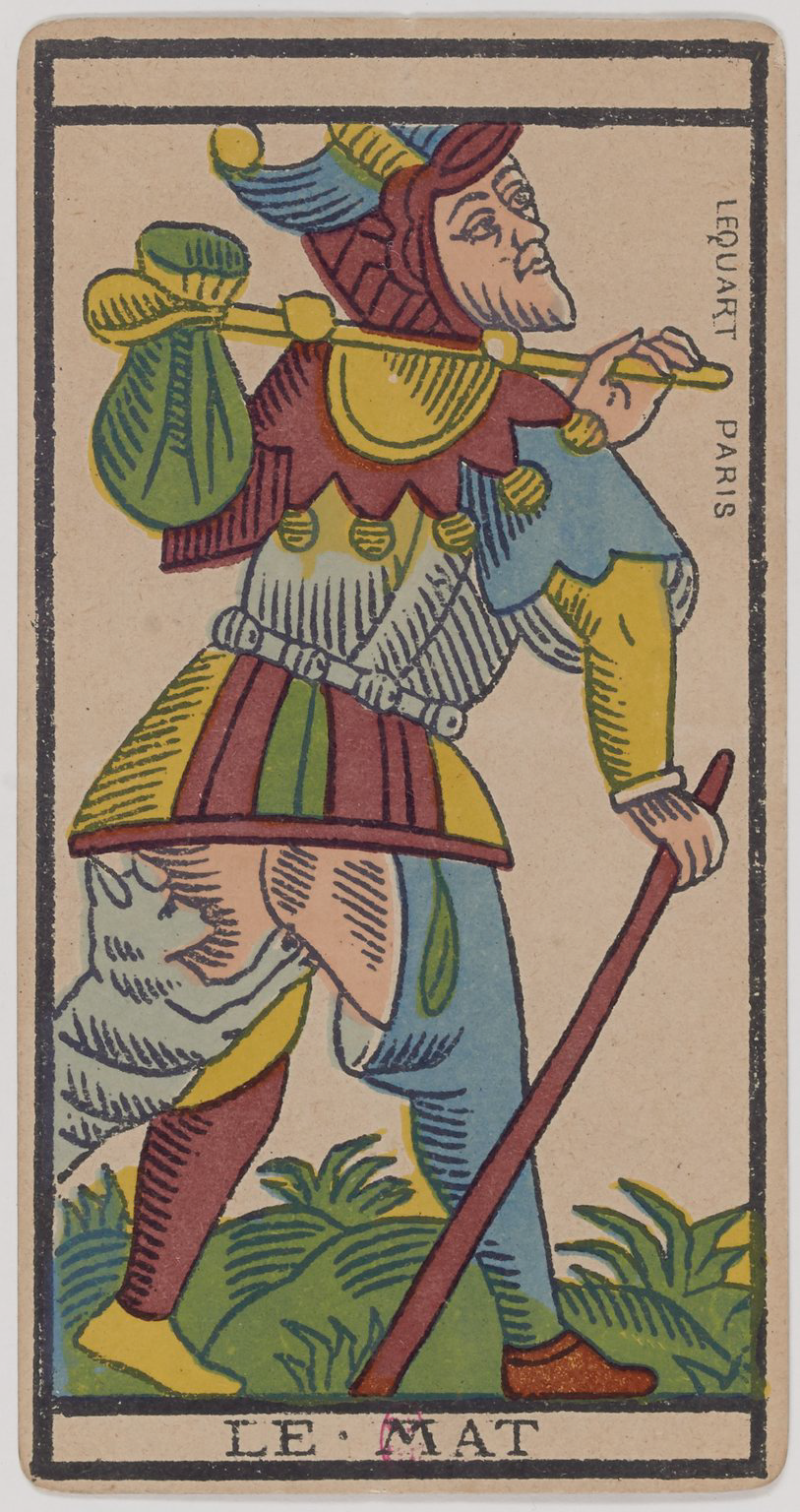
The Fool tarot card from an 1890 deck

In tarot, "The Fool" is a card of the Major Arcana. The tarot depiction of the Fool often shows a man (or less often, a woman) dressed in bright clothes and holding a white rose in one hand and a small bundle of possessions in the other, with a dog or cat at their heels. The fool is in the act of unknowingly walking off the edge of a cliff, precipice, or other high place.

== Modern usage ==
=== Buffoon ===
In a similar vein, a buffoon is someone who provides amusement through inappropriate appearance or behaviour. Originally the term was used to describe a ridiculous but amusing person. The term is now frequently used in a derogatory sense to describe someone considered foolish, or someone displaying inappropriately vulgar, bumbling or ridiculous behaviour which is a source of general amusement. The term originates from the old Italian "buffare", meaning to puff out one's cheeks that also applies to bouffon. Having swelled their cheeks they would slap them to expel the air and produce a noise which amused the spectators.

=== Carnival and medieval reenactment ===
During the Burgundian and the Rhenish carnival, cabaret performances in local dialect are held. In Brabant this person is called a "tonpraoter" or "sauwelaar", and is actually in or on a barrel. In Limburg they are named "buuttereedner" or "buutteredner" and in Zeeland they are called an "ouwoer". They all perform a cabaret speech in dialect, during which many current issues are reviewed. Often there are local situations and celebrities from local and regional politics who are mocked, ridiculed and insulted. The "Tonpraoter" or "Buuttereedner" may be considered successors of the jesters.

== Notable jesters ==
=== Historical ===
- Triboulet (1479–1536), court jester of Kings Louis XII and Francis I of France
- Stańczyk (c. 1480 – c. 1560), Polish jester
- João de Sá Panasco (fl. 1524–1567), African court jester of King John III of Portugal, eventually elevated to gentleman courtier of the Royal Household and Knight of St. James
- Henry Patenson (c. 1487–1543), natural household fool to Thomas More and his family
- Jane Foole (c. 1543–1558), natural fool of Catherine Parr and Mary I of England
- Will Sommers (died 1560), court jester of King Henry VIII of England
- Chicot (c. 1540–1591), court jester of King Henry III of France
- Mathurine de Vallois (fl. 1589 – fl. 1627), court jester of Henry III of France and Henry IV of France
- Archibald Armstrong (died 1672), jester of King James I of England
- Jeffrey Hudson (1619 – c. 1682), "court dwarf" of Henrietta Maria of France
- Jamie Fleeman (1713–1778), the Laird of Udny's Fool
- Perkeo of Heidelberg, 18th century, jester of Prince Charles III Philip, Elector Palatine
- Sebastian de Morra, (died 1649) court dwarf and jester to King Philip IV of Spain
- Don Diego de Acedo, court dwarf and jester to Philip IV of Spain
- Roulandus le Fartere, a medieval flatulist who lived in twelfth-century England

=== Modern-day jesters ===
- Jesse Bogdonoff (b. 1955), former court jester and financial advisor to King Tāufaʻāhau Tupou IV of Tonga
- Russel Erwood (b. 1981), known as Erwyd le Fol, is the 2nd official resident jester of Conwy in North Wales, succeeding the jester of 1295

=== Fictional jesters ===
- Rigoletto – eponymous jester to the Duke of Mantua in Giuseppe Verdi's 1851 opera Rigoletto
- Yorick – dead court jester in William Shakespeare's play Hamlet
- Puck – court jester to the king of the fairies, Oberon in Shakespeare's A Midsummer Night's Dream
- Jack Point – a 'strolling jester' in Gilbert and Sullivan's 1888 Savoy opera, The Yeomen of the Guard
- Giacomo – 'king of jesters and jester of kings' in the 1956 film The Court Jester, who is impersonated by the protagonist, Hubert Hawkins
- Nights – protagonist in the 1996 video game Nights into Dreams
- Dimentio – antagonist in the 2007 video game Super Paper Mario
- Jimbo – mascot in the indie game Balatro
- Jevil – secret boss in Deltarune
- Cicero – assassin jester from The Elder Scrolls V: Skyrim
- Patchface and Mushroom – court jesters from George R.R. Martin's A Song of Ice and Fire series and Fire and Blood respectively
- Pomni – protagonist in the adult animated web series The Amazing Digital Circus
- Per'kele – antagonist in Fear & Hunger 2: Termina
- The Prototype / Experiment 1006 – antagonist in indie game Poppy Playtime
- Daycare Attendant – A character with split protagonist (Sun) and antagonist (Moon) personalities that first appears in the game Five Nights at Freddy's: Security Breach
- Marx – antagonist from Kirby Super Star
- The Fool – playable character from Reverse: 1999
- Shecky - secondary antagonist from The Biskitts

== Gallery ==
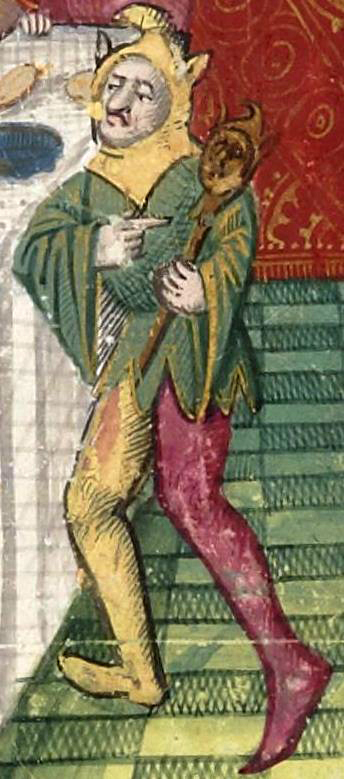
Illumination from a French Lancelot manuscript, c. 1470 (detail)

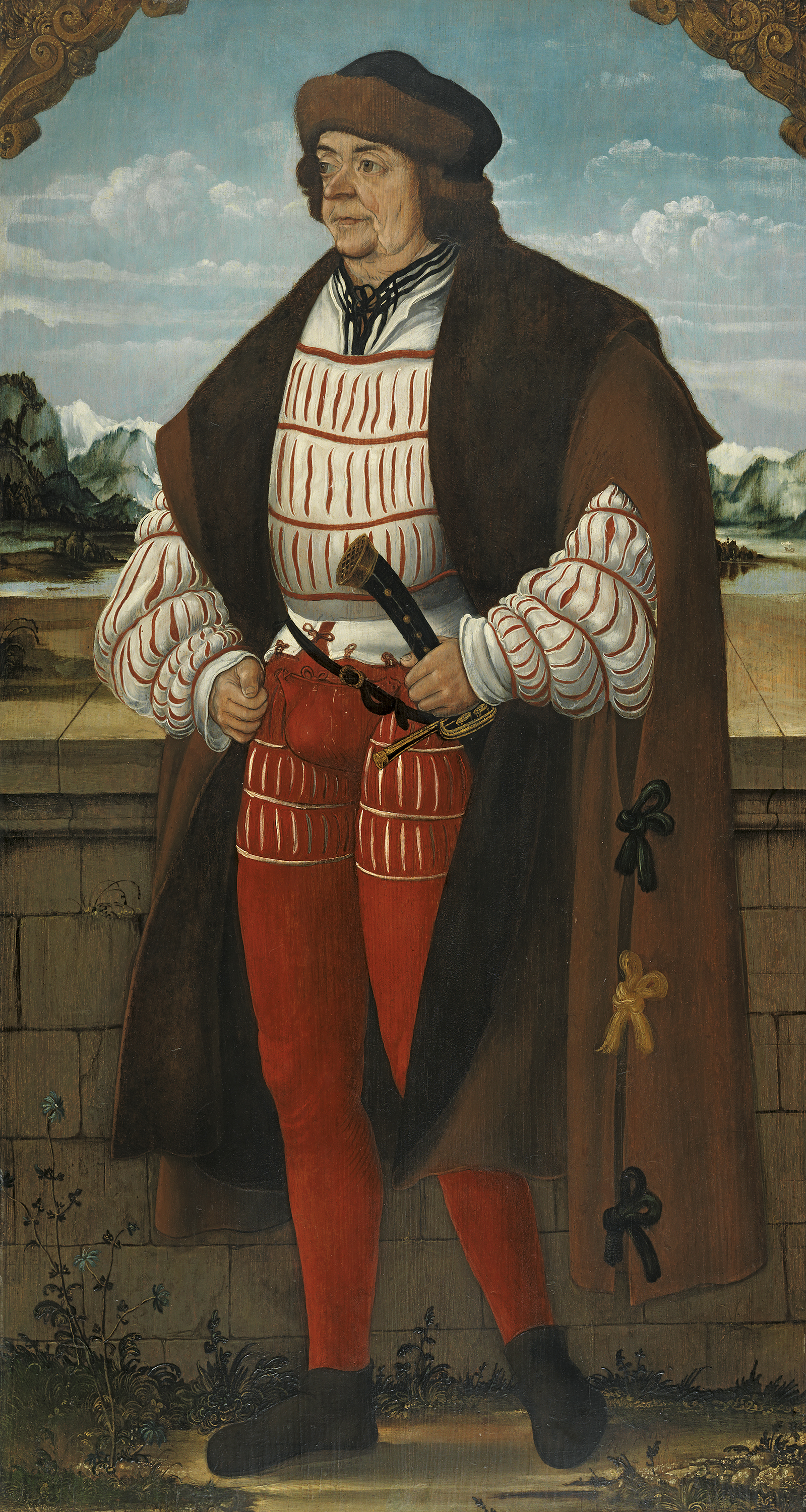
Jester Knight Christoph by Hans Wertinger, 1515 (Thyssen-Bornemisza, Madrid)

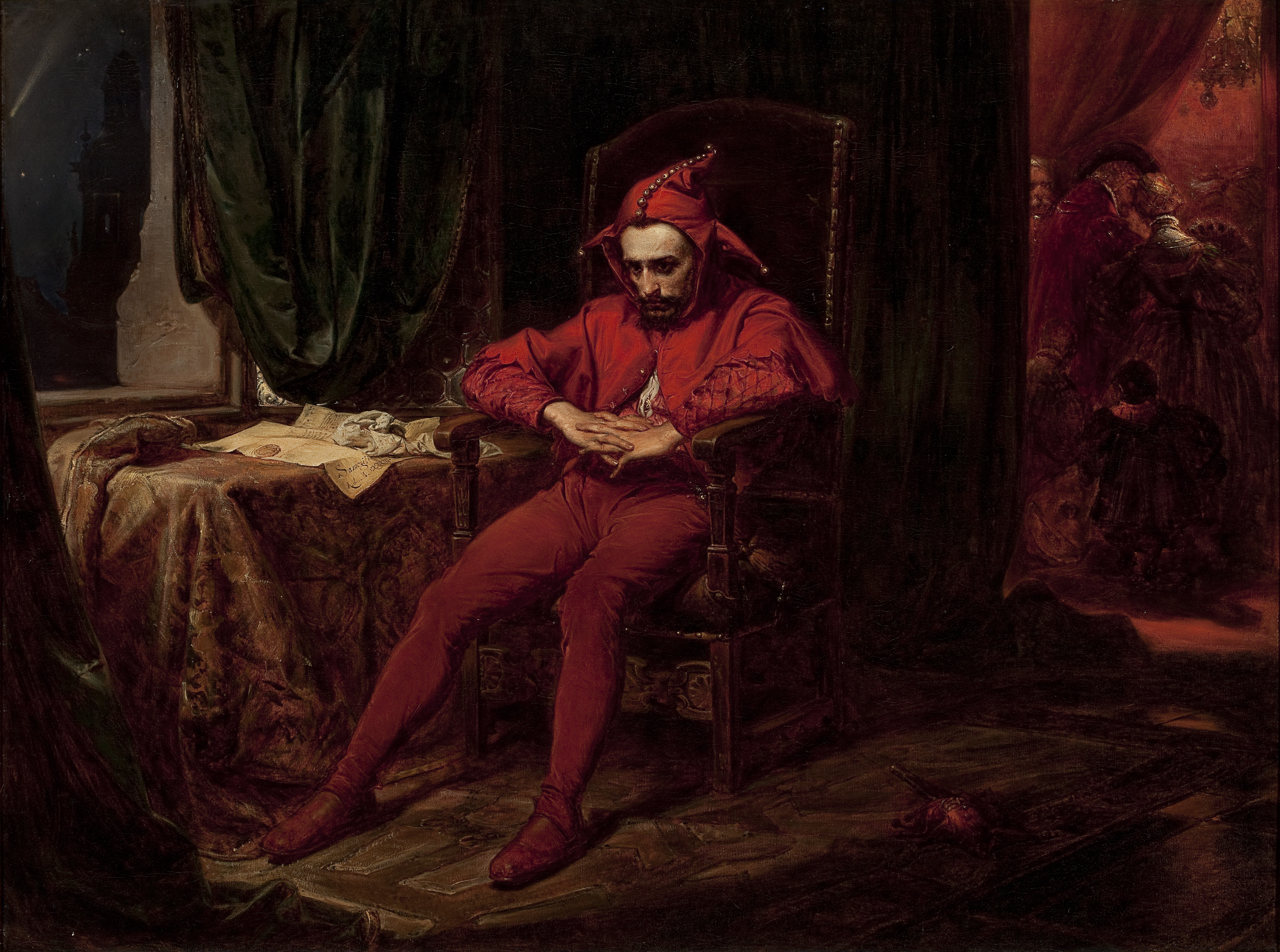
Stańczyk, Polish court jester, during the siege of Smolensk in 1514, by Jan Matejko, 1862 (National Museum, Warsaw)

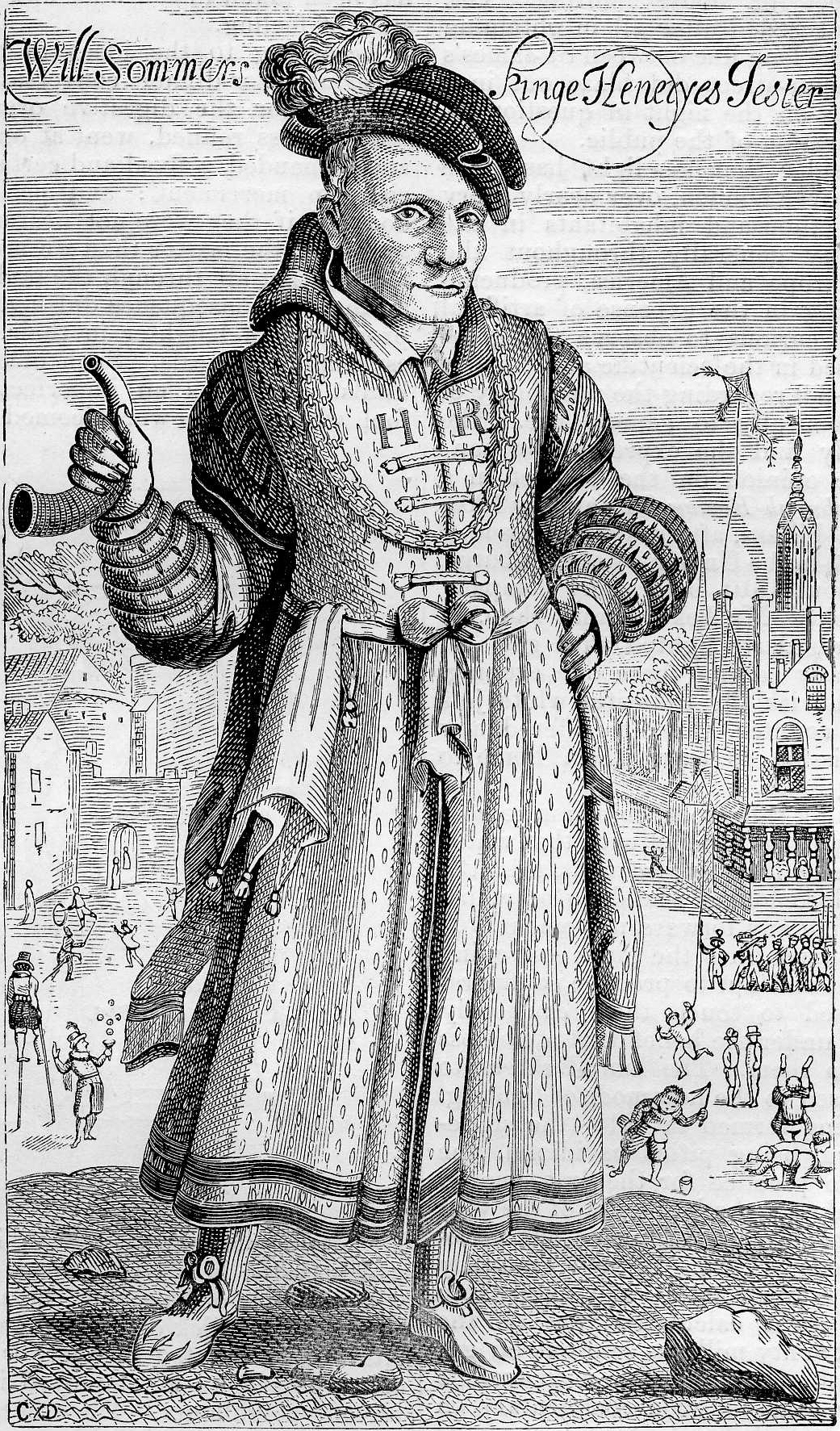
Henry VIII's jester Will Sommers, engraving by Francis Delaram, c. 1615/24

Queen Henrietta Maria with Sir Jeffrey Hudson by Van Dyck, 1633

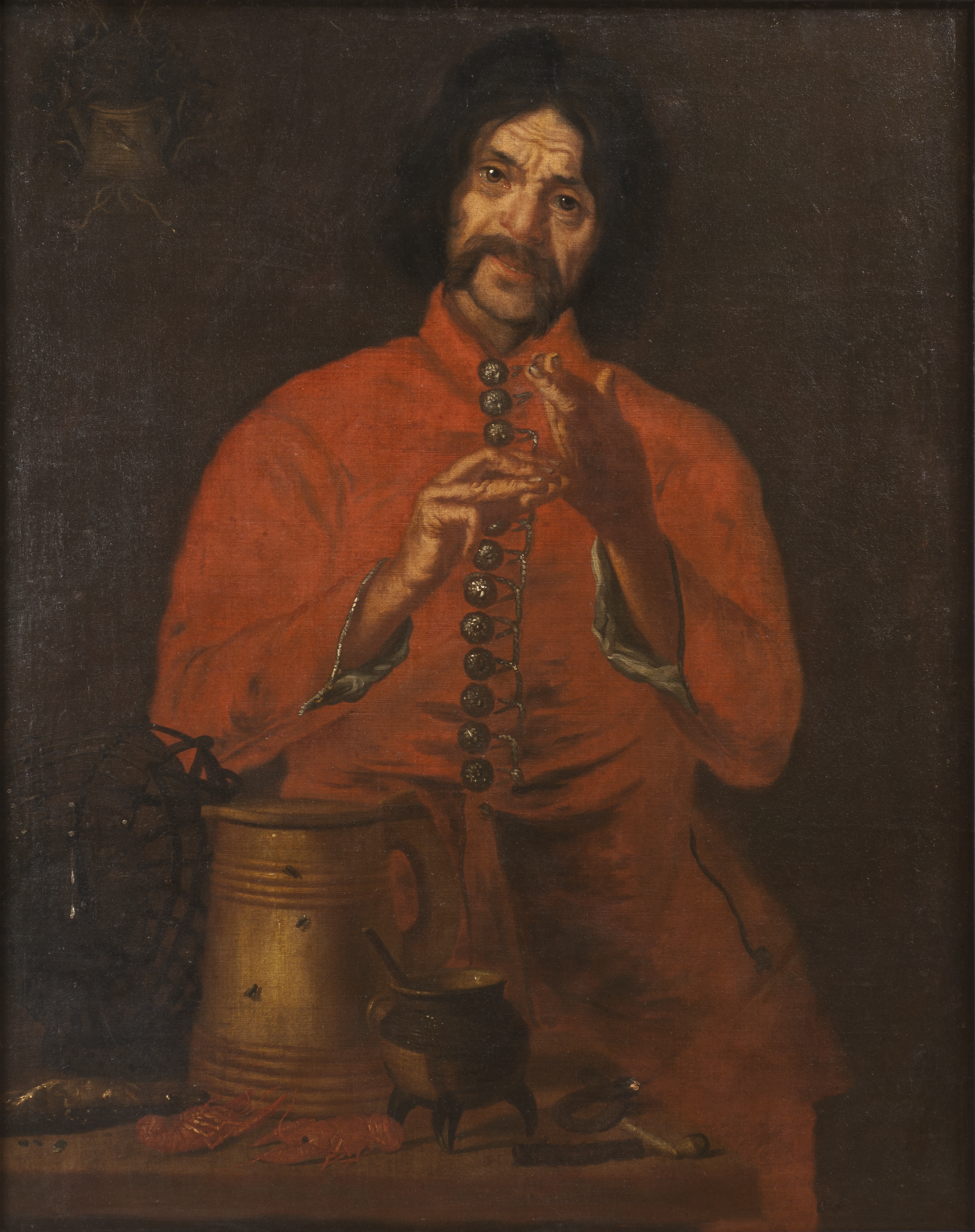
Hinric Hasenberger, the Court Jester by David Klöcker Ehrenstrahl, 1652

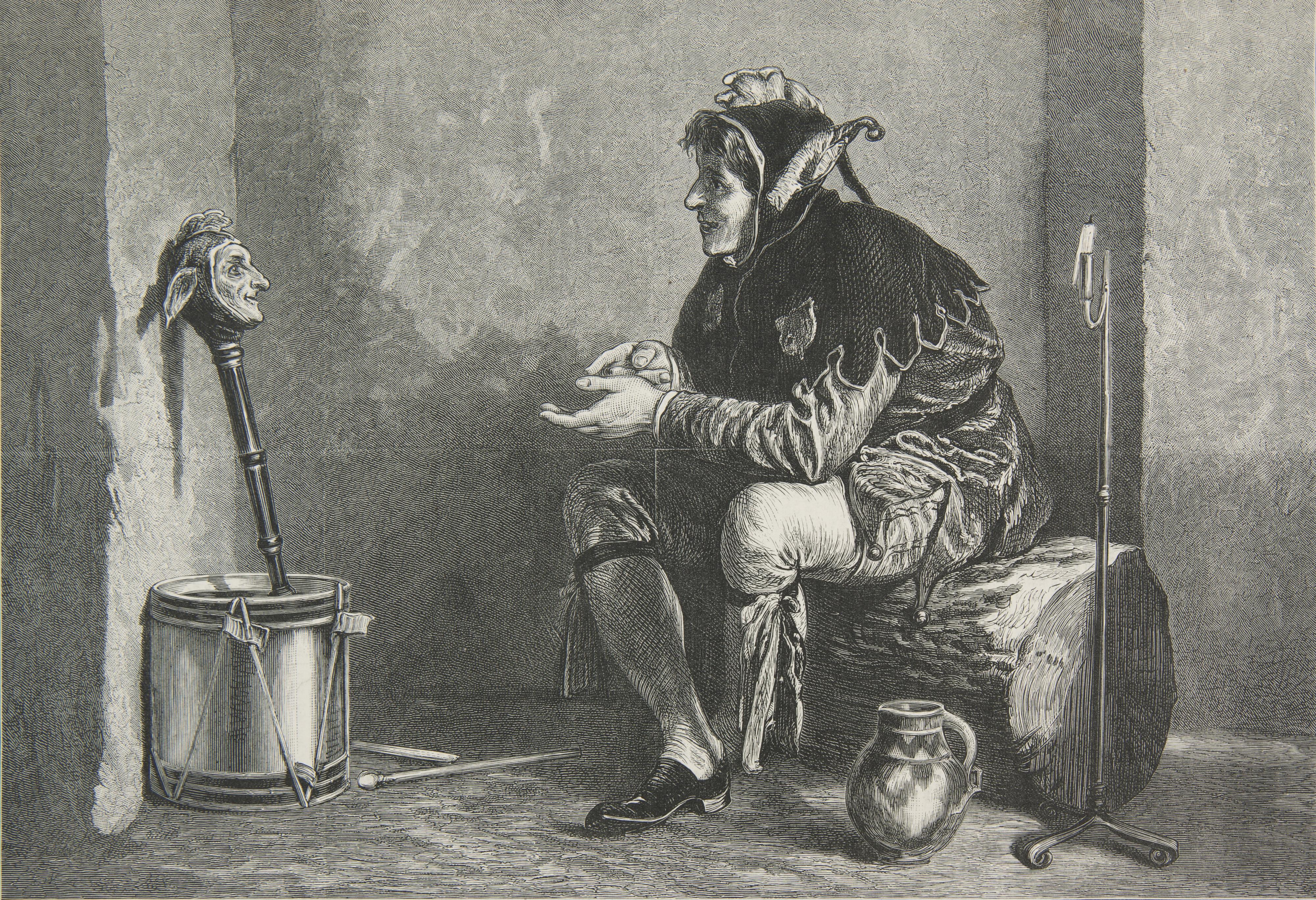
John Dawson Watson (1832–1892), Friends in Council

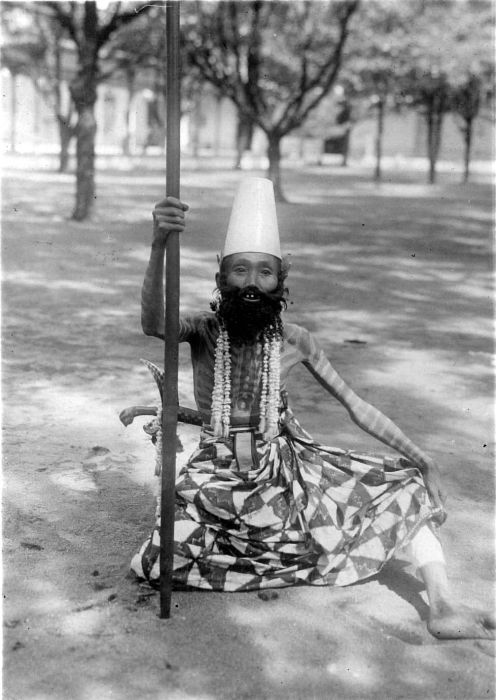
Susuhunan jester participating in the Garebeg Moeloed procession, Java (Indonesia), c. 1920s

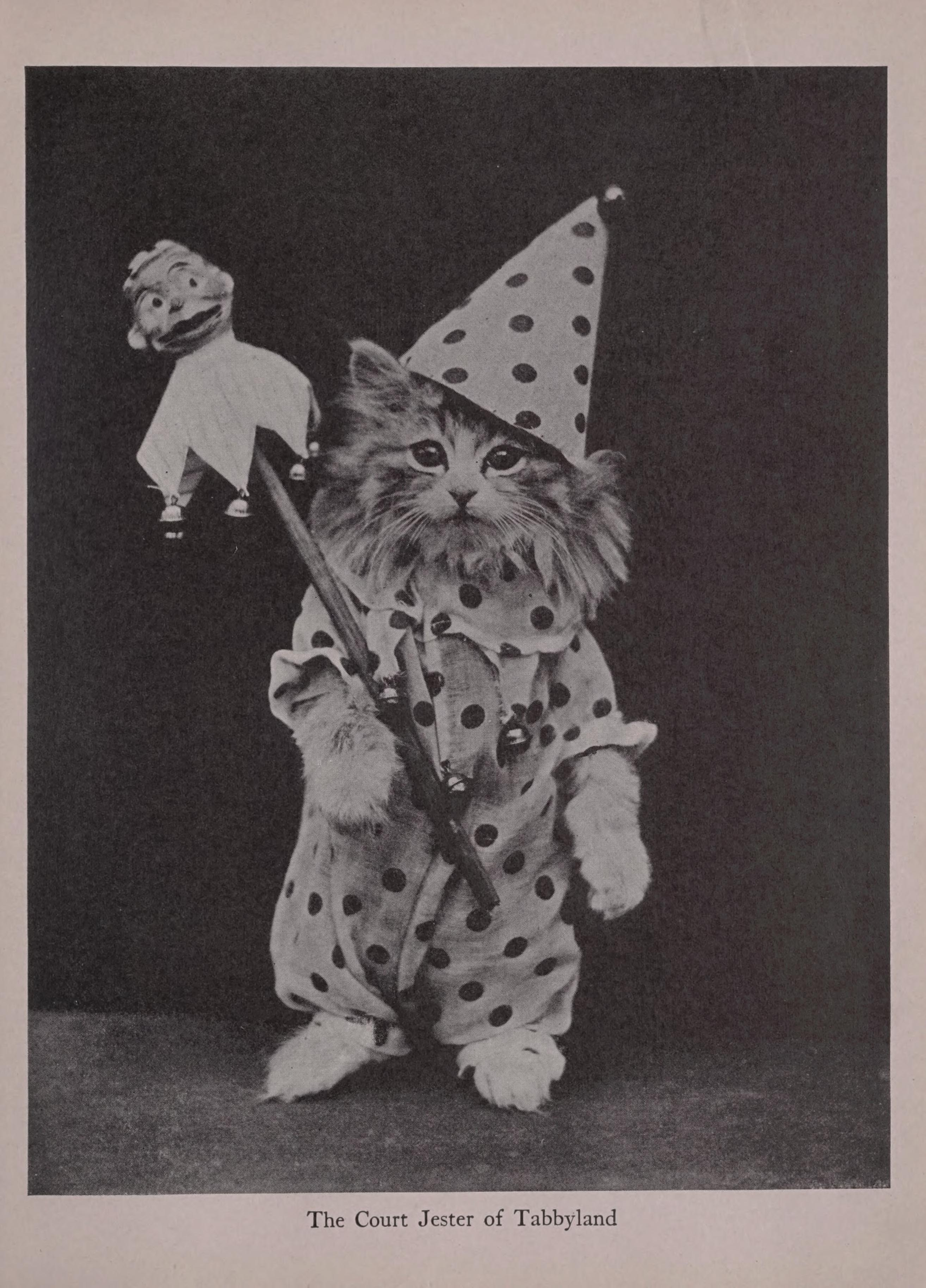
The Court Jester of Tabbyland

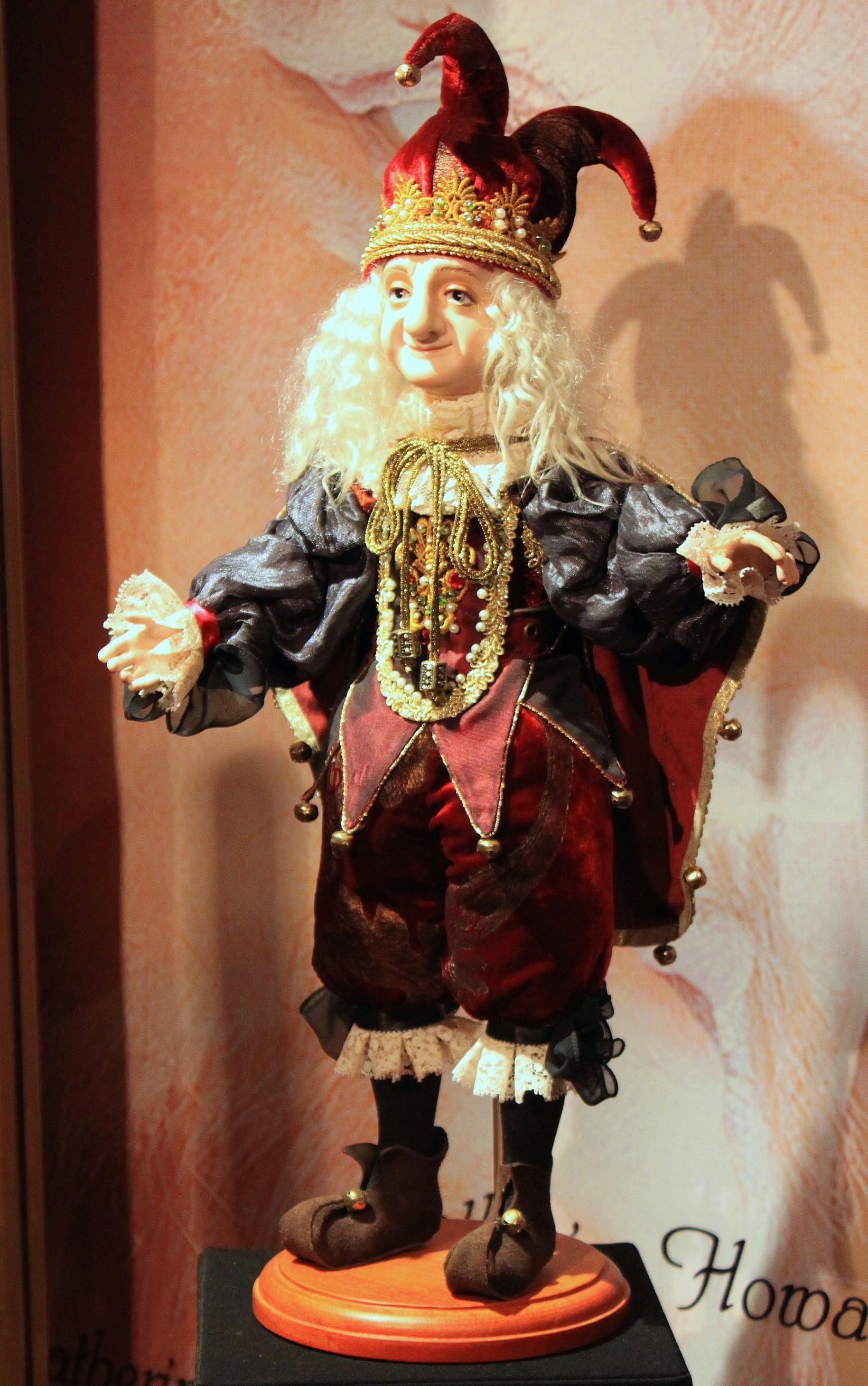
Jester-doll made by Olina Ventsel (1938–2007)

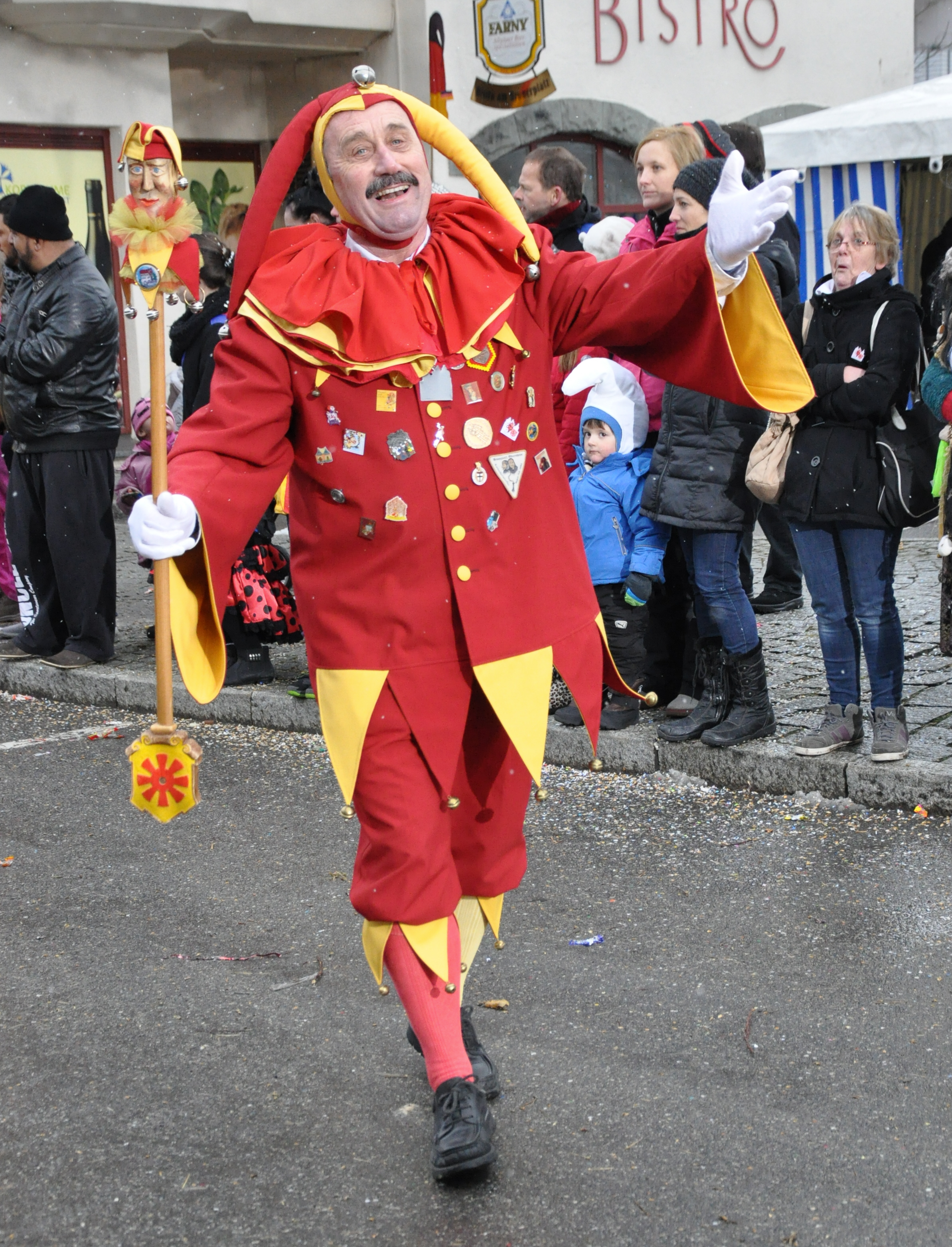
Jester in Weingarten, Germany, in 2015

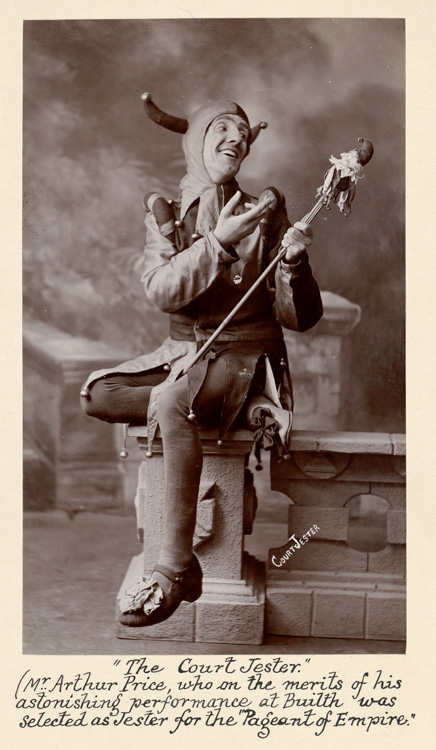
Mr. Arthur Price, selected as "The Court Jester" at the Pageant of Empire in 1909

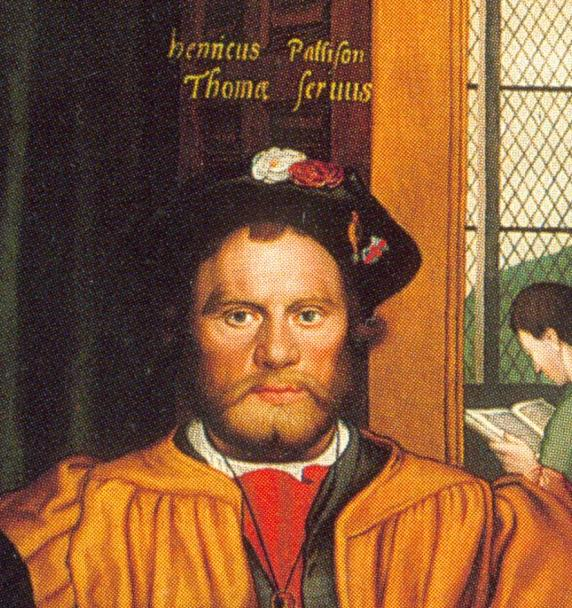
Henry Patenson, Sir Thomas More's household fool

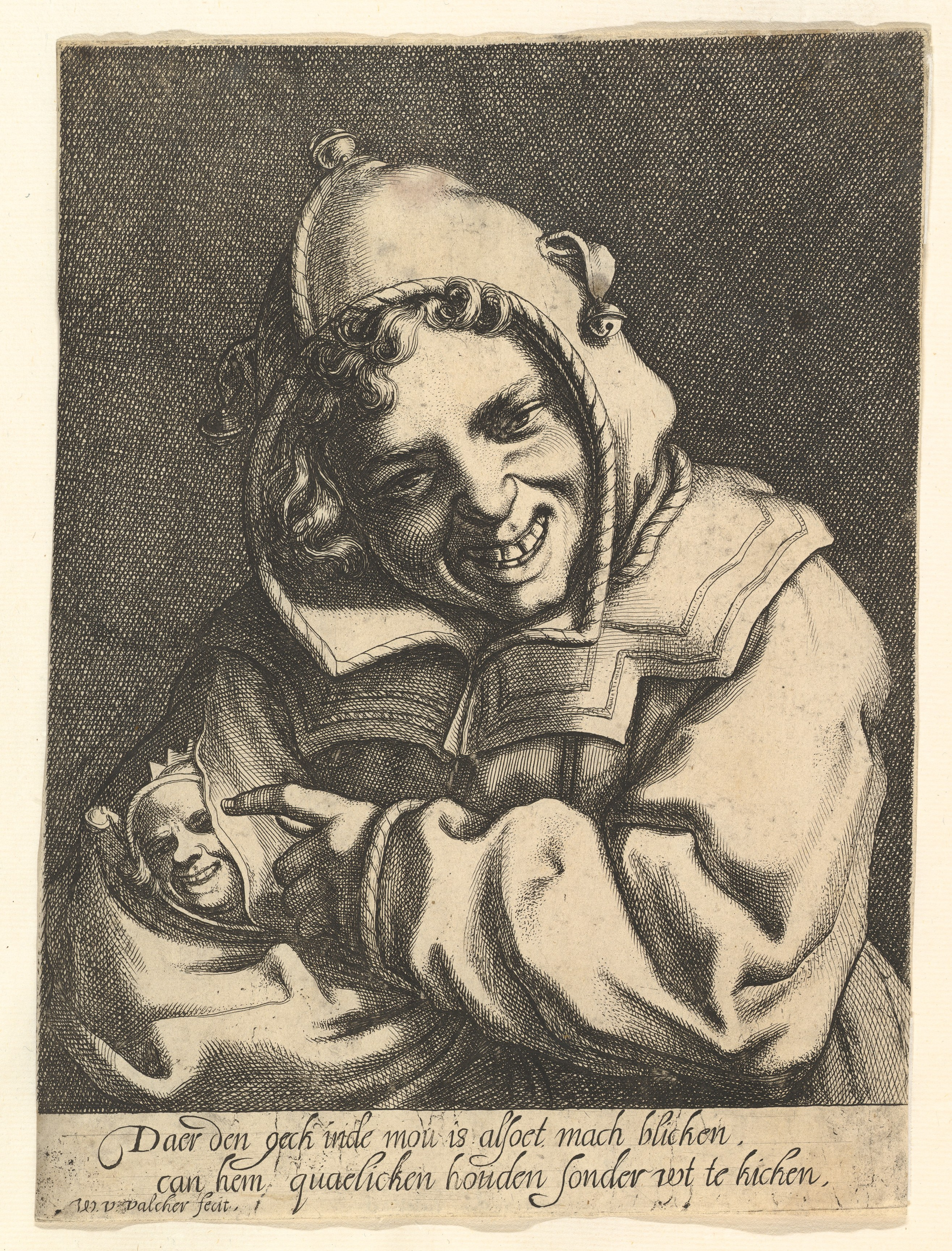
Laughing Fool by Werner van den Valckert, circa 1612

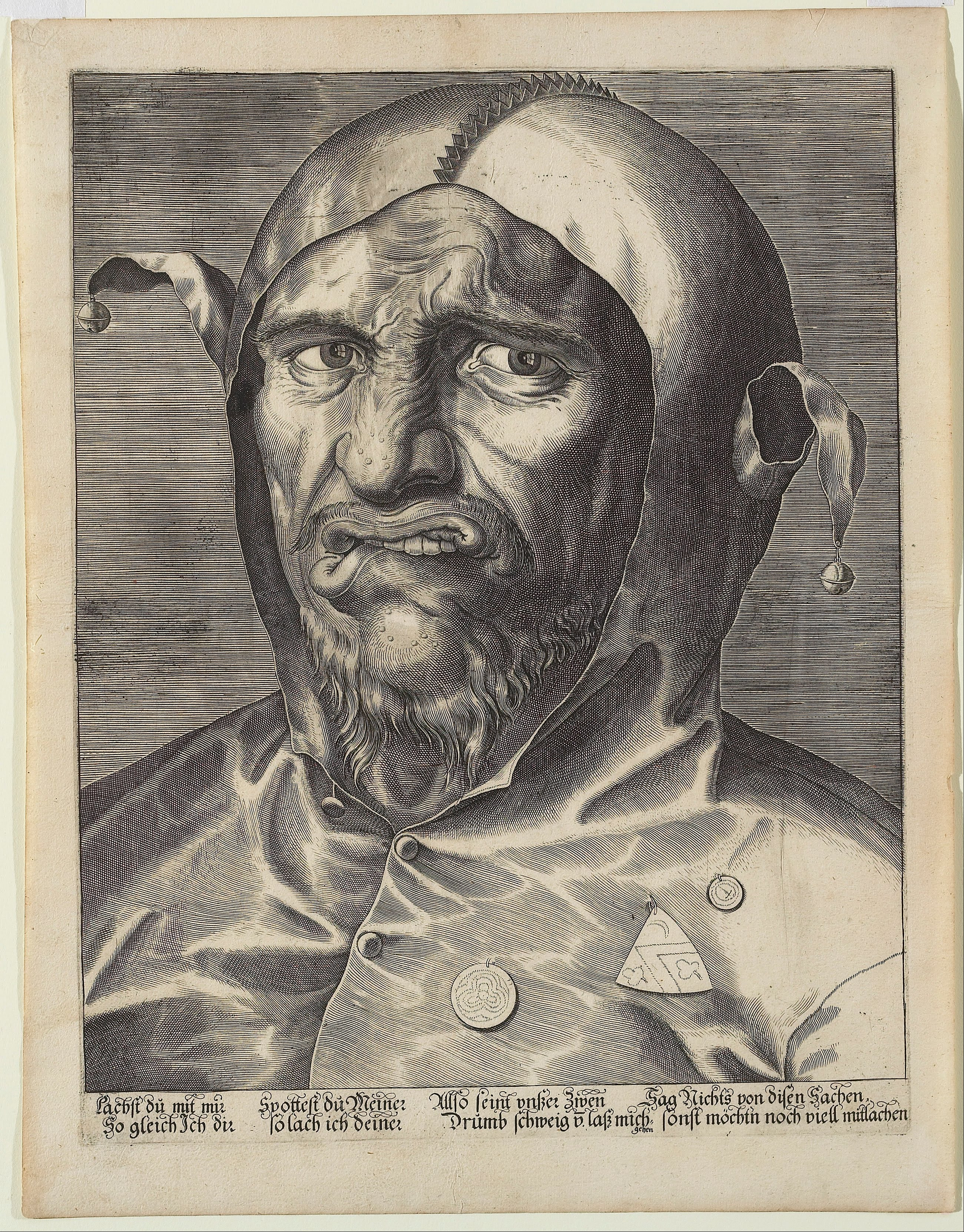
Large head of a jester, anonymous German engraving, 16th century

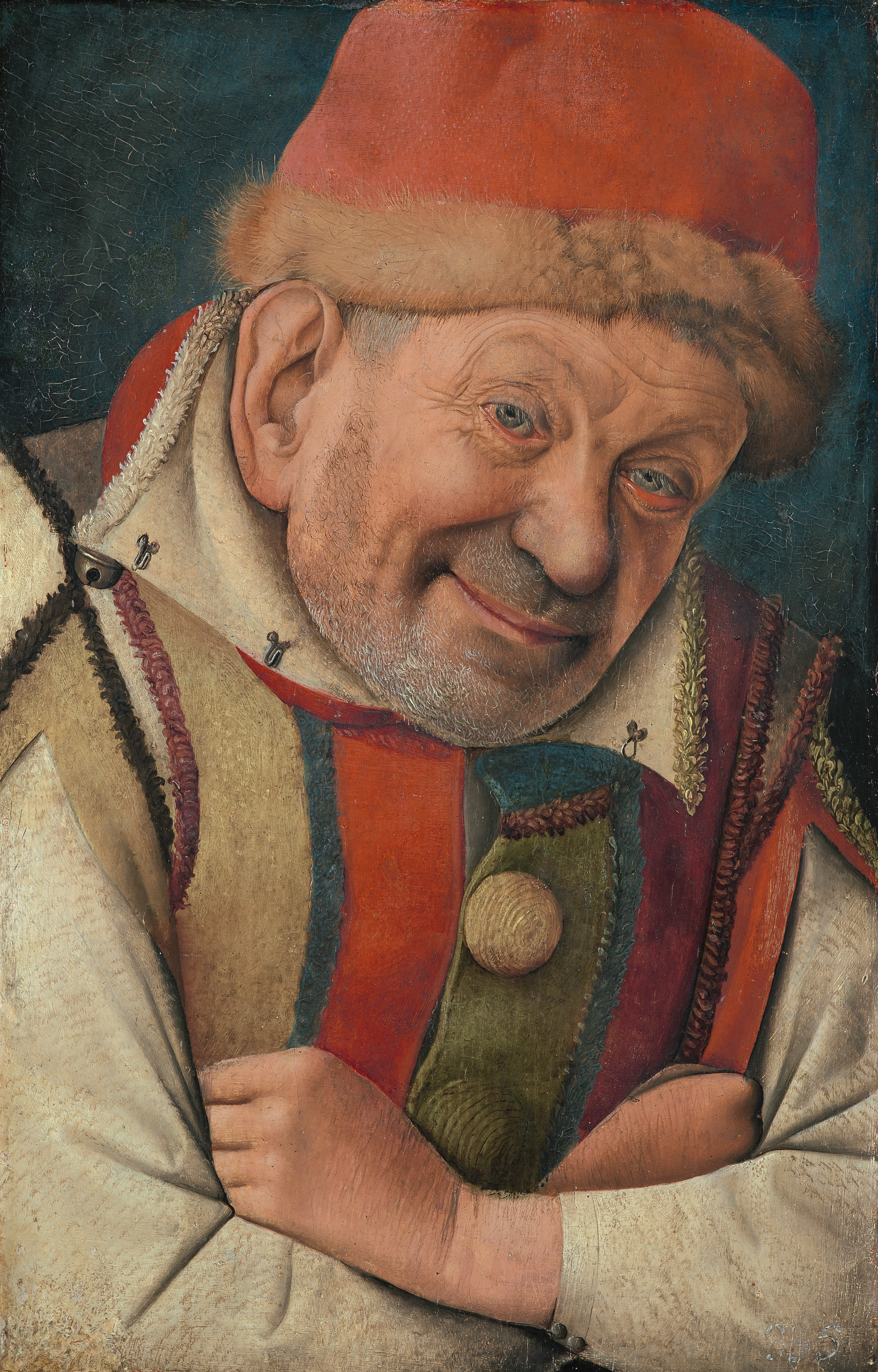
Portrait of the Ferrara Court Jester Gonella by Jean Fouquet 1445

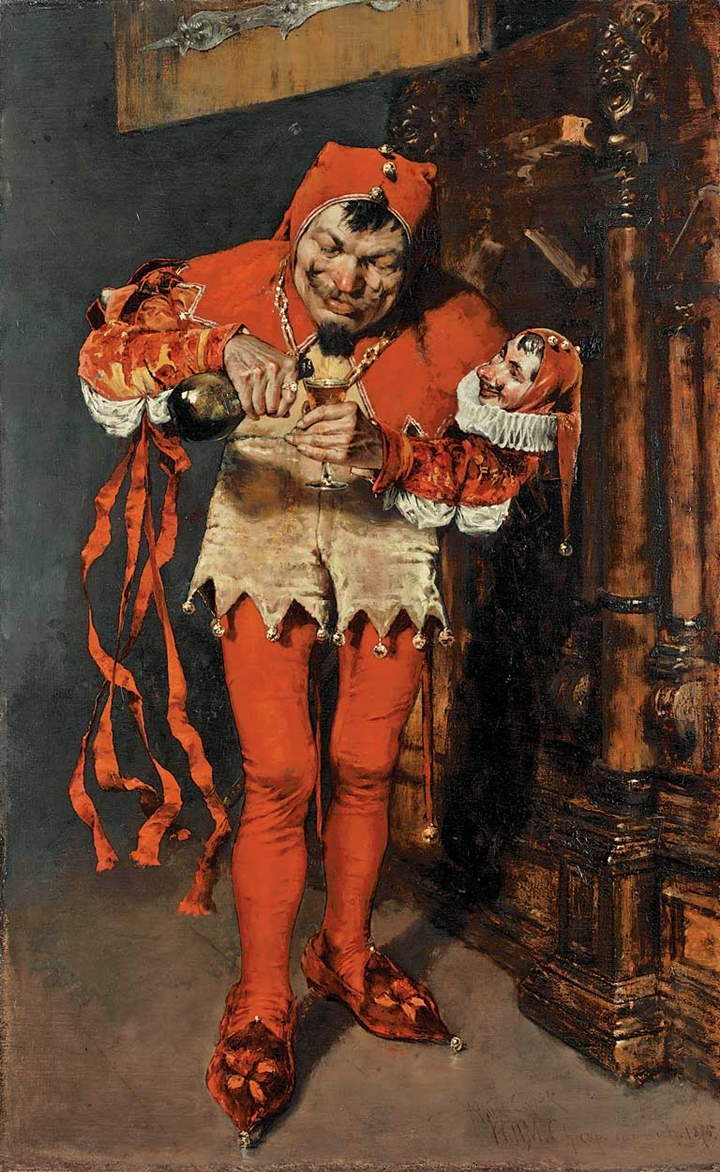
Keying Up – The Court Jester by William Merritt Chase, 1875

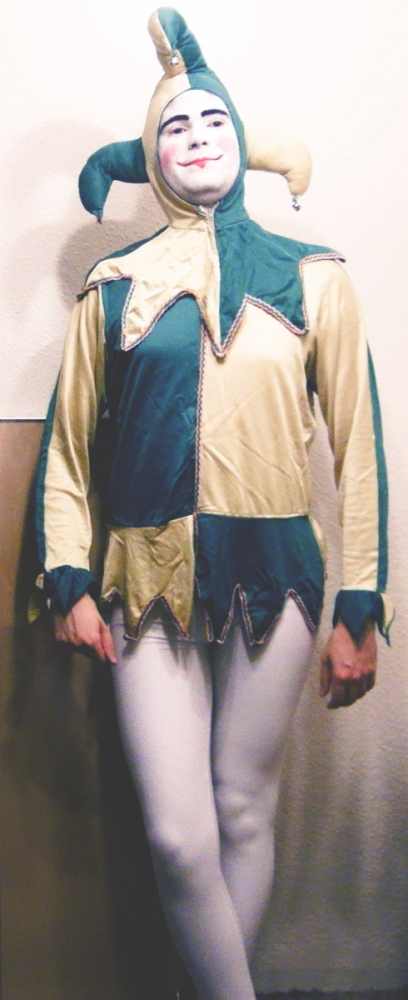
Man dressed as a jester, with a fool's cap, motley and white tights

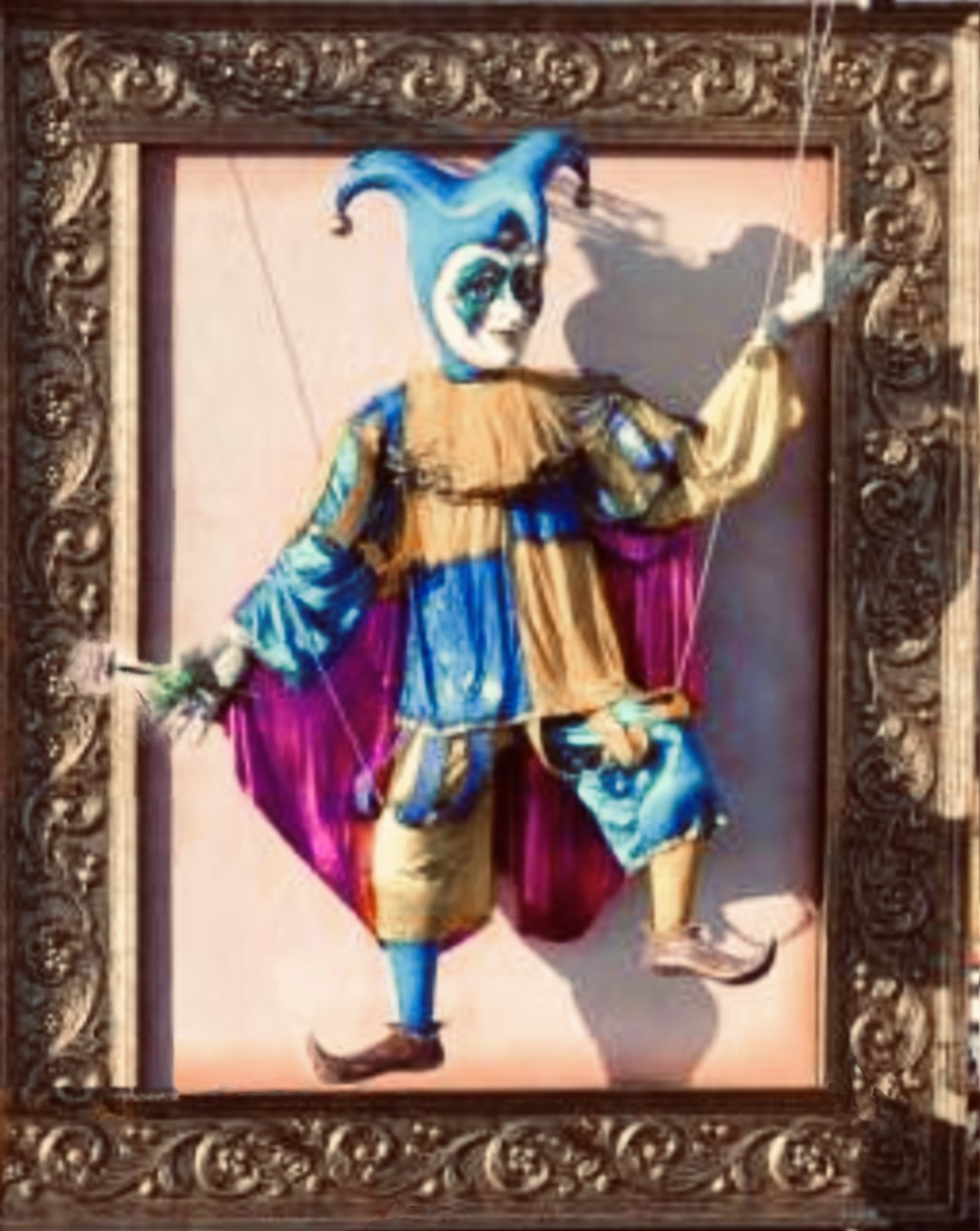
Jester on carnival float

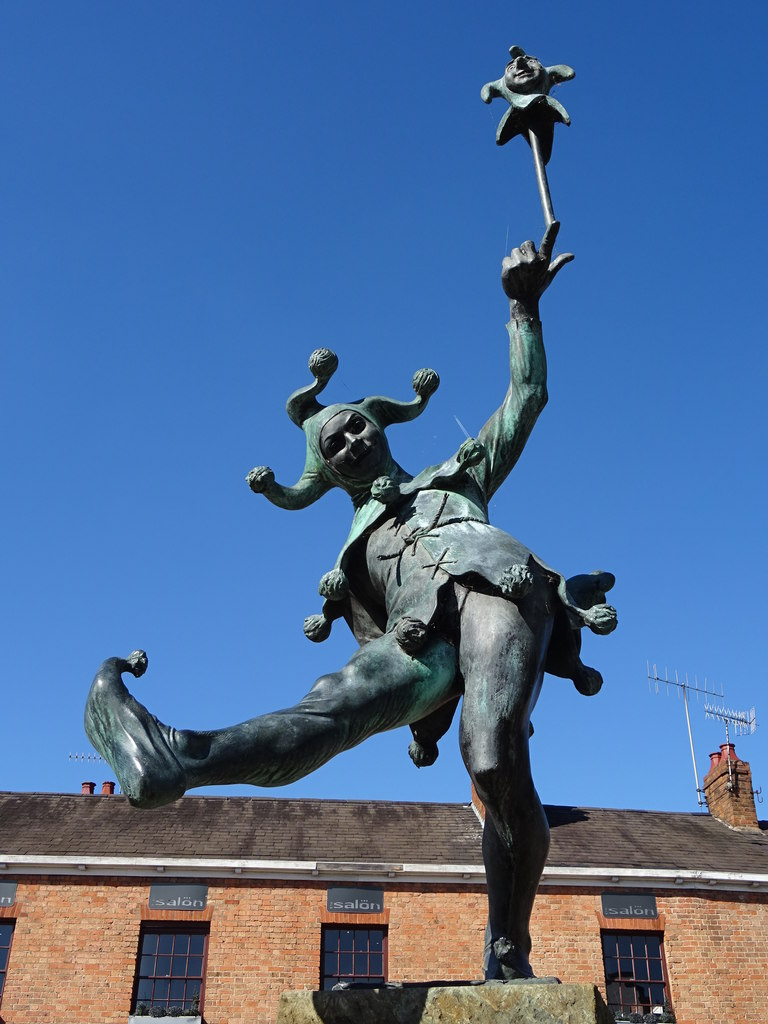
The Jester, a sculpture in Stratford-upon-Avon

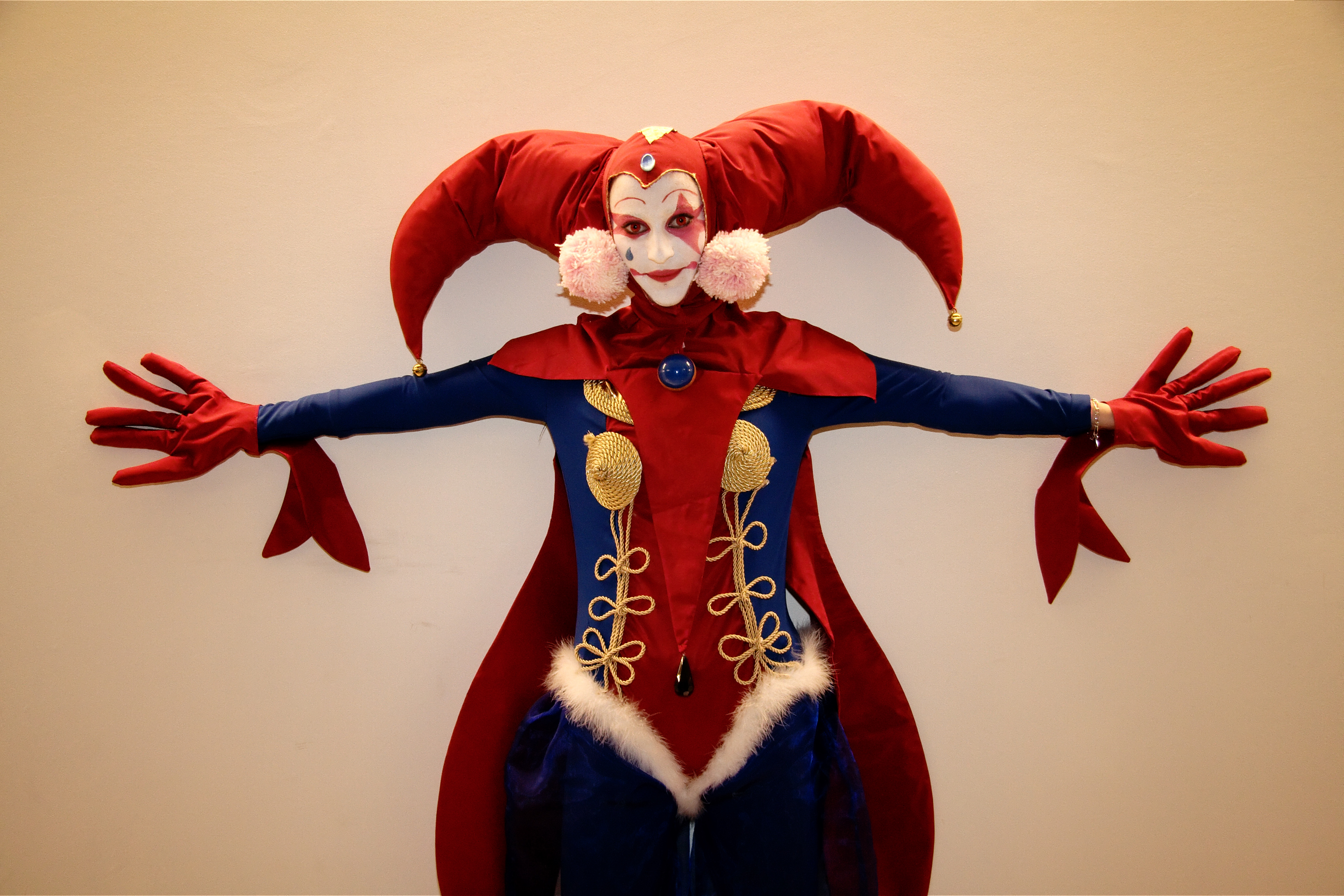
A jester at Manga Expo 2007 (Paris, France)

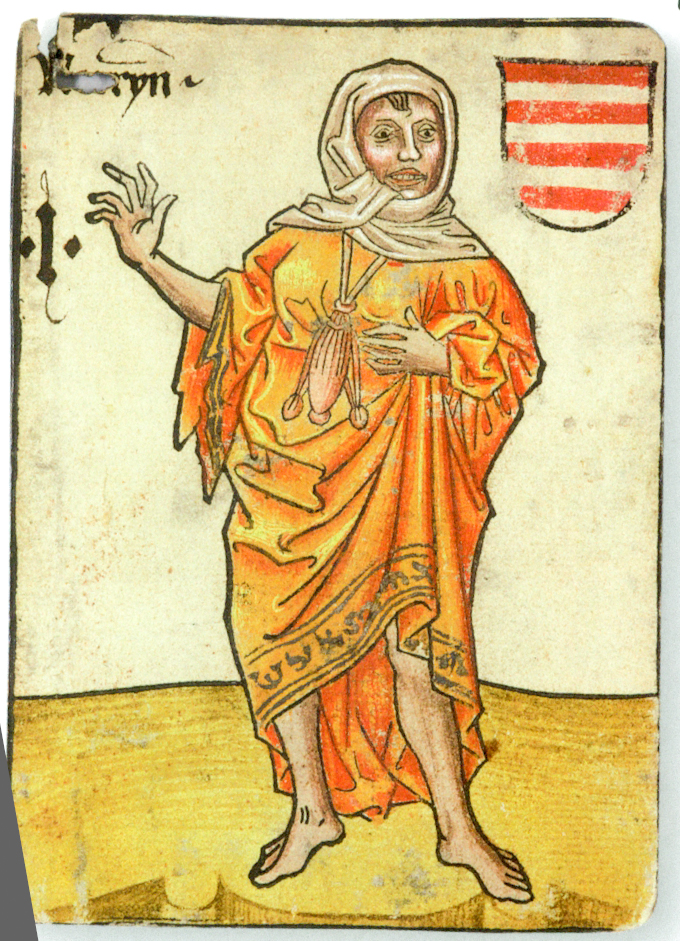
Hungarian female jester on the playing card of the Vienna court

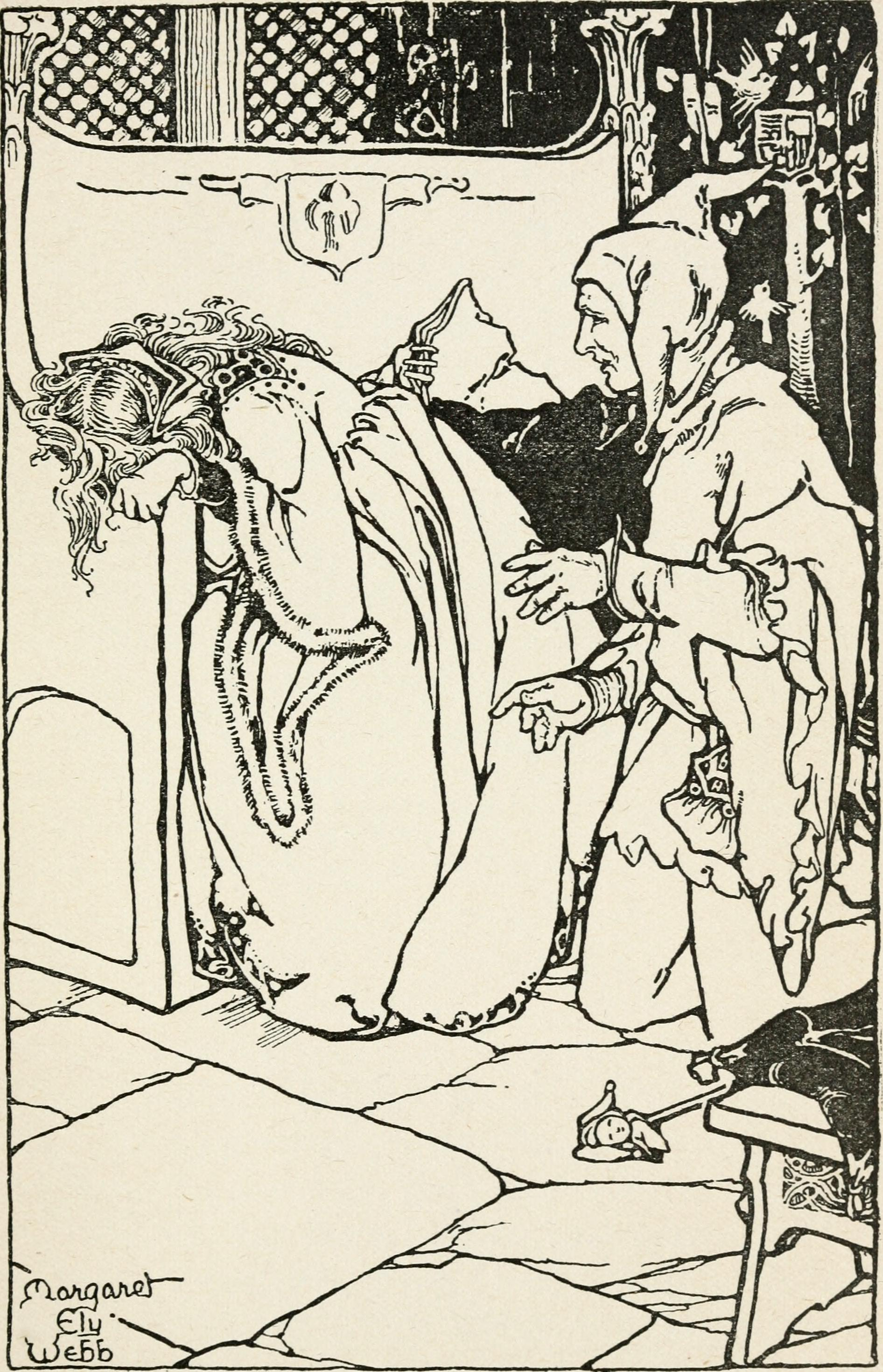
The court jester (1906)

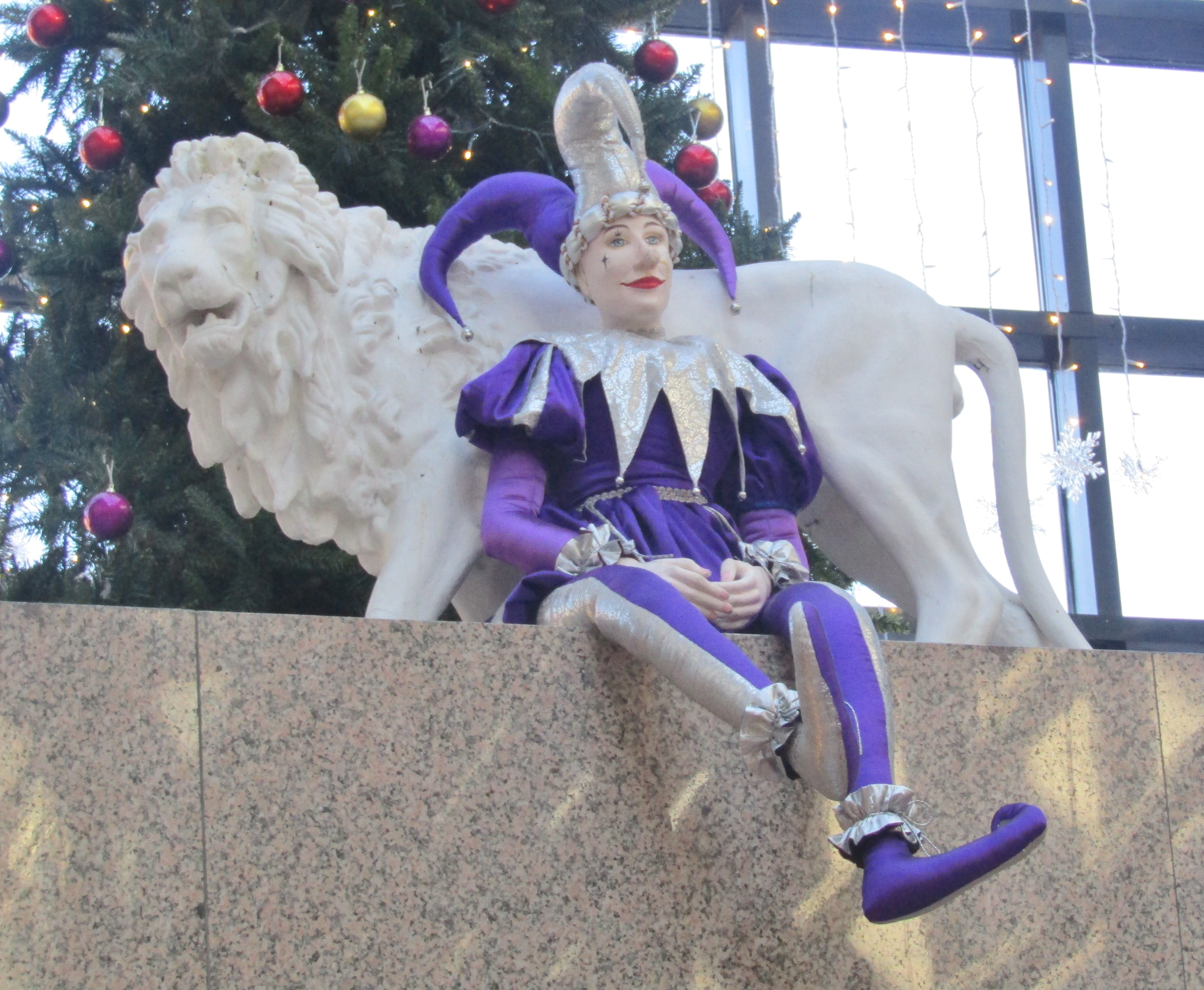
Jester Moment

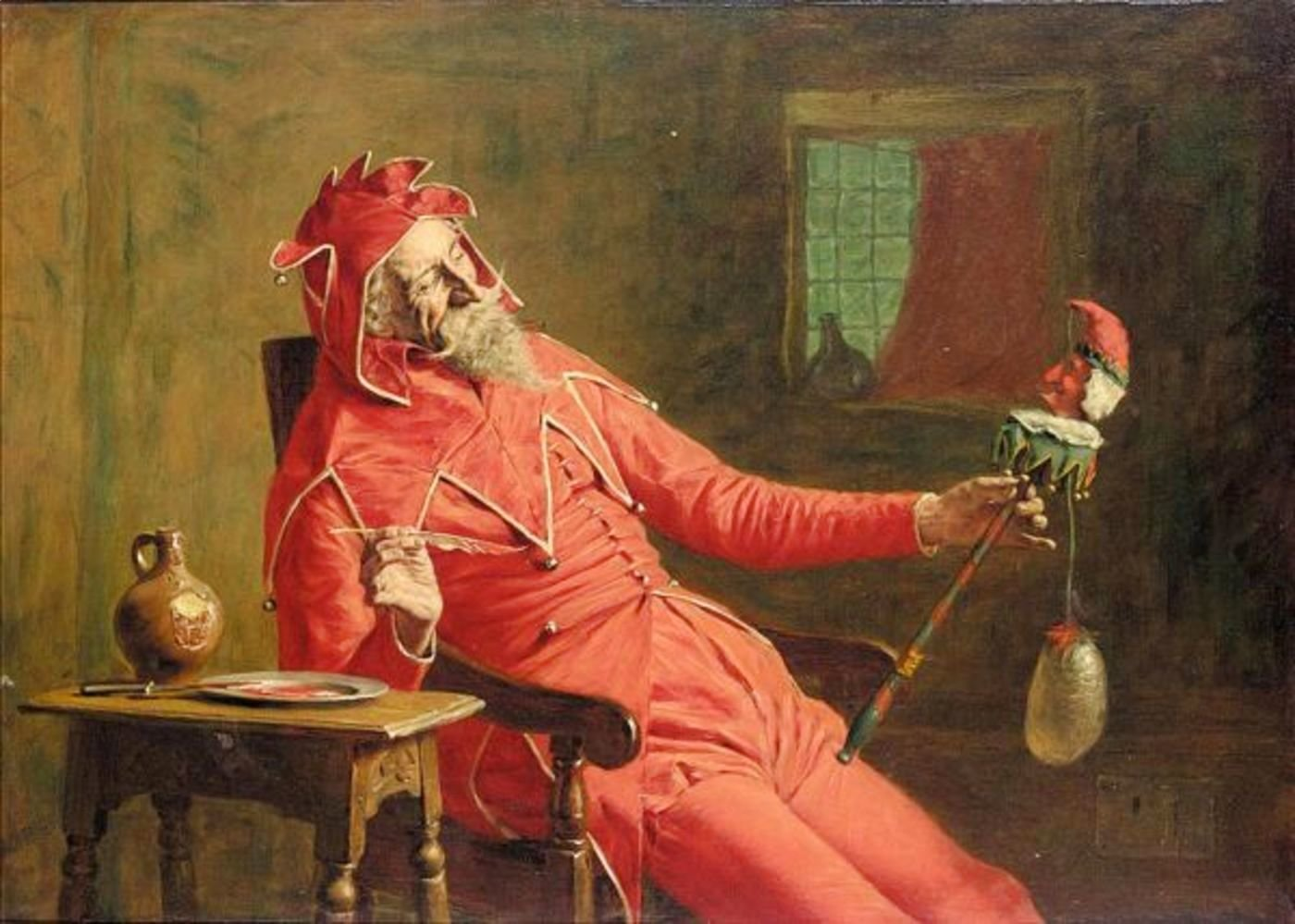
The Court Jester by John Watson Nicol

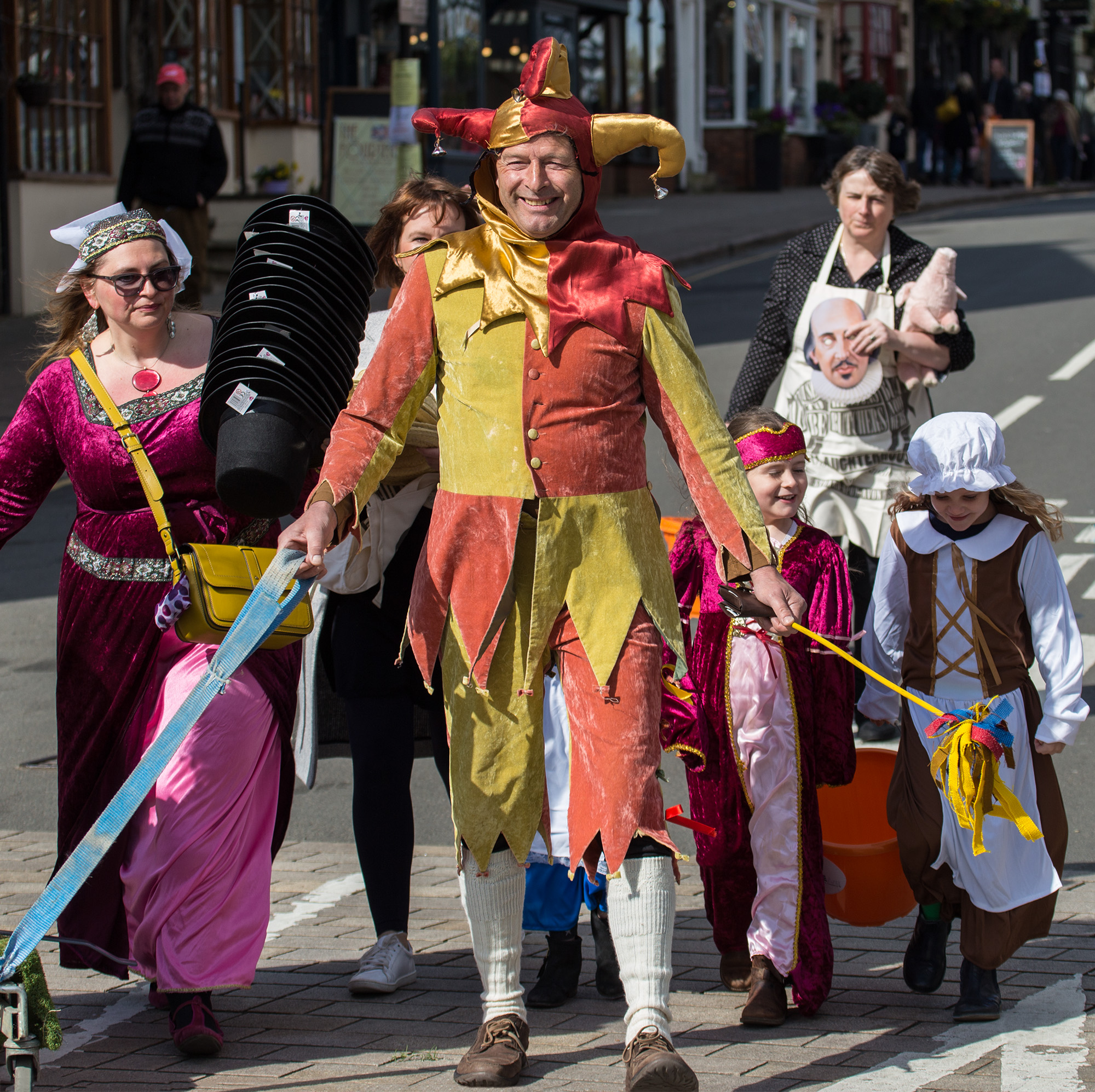
A man dressed as a jester

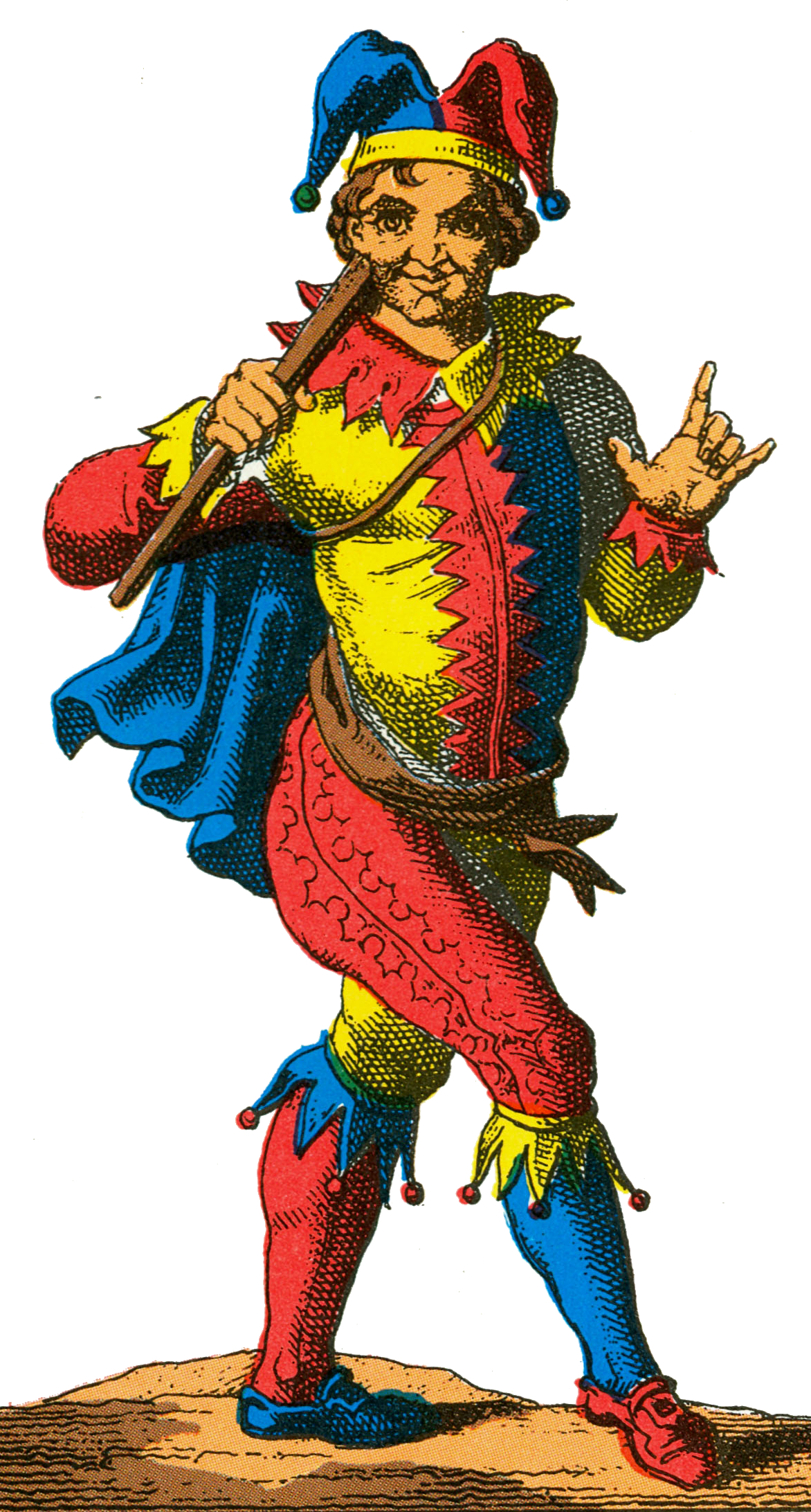
The Fool's tarot, between 1831 and 1838

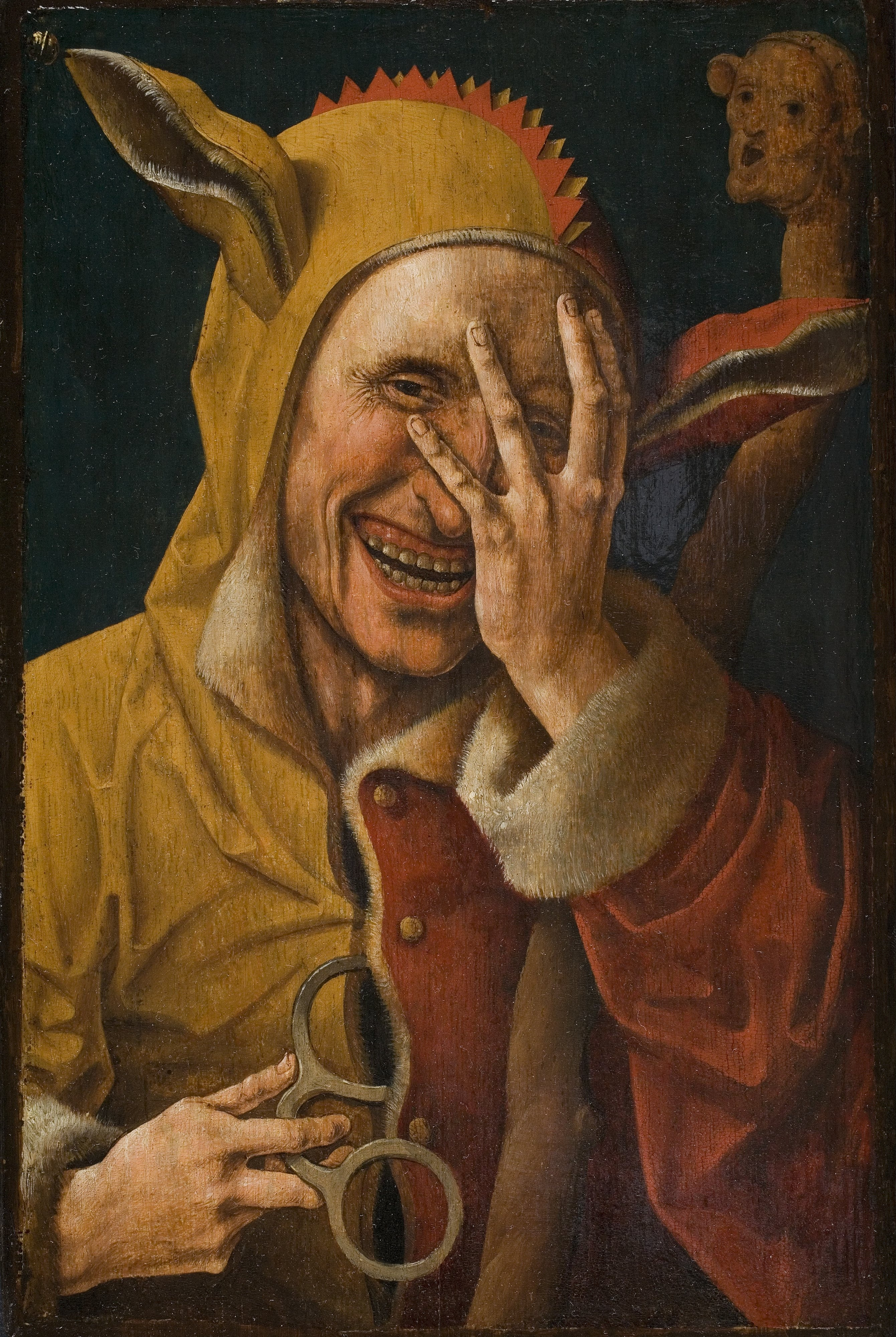
Laughing Jester, unknown Early Netherlandish artist (possibly Jacob Cornelisz van Oostsanen), c. 1500

== See also ==
- Basil Fool for Christ – Russian saint (1468–1552/1557)
- Chou role – Clown role in Chinese opera
- Clown society – Organization of comedic entertainers
- Drollery – Decorative image in the margin of an illuminated manuscript
- Fool (stock character)
- Fool's literature
- Foolishness for Christ
- Fools Guild
- Harlequin
- Heyoka – Type of sacred clown in the culture of the Sioux peoples
- Joker (playing card)
- King Momo – Performer in Latin American festivities
- Madame d'Or – French jester
- Master of the Revels
- Mime
- Pierrot
- Pueblo clown – Generic term for jesters or tricksters in the Pueblo religion
- Punakawan – Figures in Javanese puppet theater
- Scaramouche – Stock clown character of the commedia dell'arte
- Silly Billy – Type of clown in 19th-century England
- Skomorokh – Medieval East Slavic performers
