= Jesse Bogdonoff =

American jester and financial advisor of Tonga (born 1955)

- Born: April 1, 1955 (age 71)
- Citizenship: United States
- Occupation: Financial adviser
- Employer: Bank of America
- Known for: Financial scandal

Jesse Bogdonoff (born April 1, 1955) is a former Bank of America financial advisor to the government of Tonga and court jester of Taufa'ahau Tupou IV, the king of Tonga. He was embroiled in a financial scandal.

== Scandal ==
Bogdonoff made headlines in 2001 and 2002 after being accused of mismanaging millions of dollars from the nation of Tonga. Gaining royal approval, he managed the Tonga Trust Fund founded by the Tongan government in a scheme in which the Tongan government sold passports to frightened Hong Kong nationals who were unnerved by the 1997 expiration of the British lease on Hong Kong from China.

In 1999, Bogdonoff recommended moving the Tongan funds to the Millennium Asset Management Company specialised in investing in viaticals (life insurance policies of dying people), which promised a 30% annual fixed return but went bankrupt in 2002, and the $33-million Tonga Trust Fund (representing 40% of the government’s annual revenue) was effectively wiped out.

The ensuing scandal resulted in the resignation of the deputy prime minister and education minister of Tonga, and there were calls to impeach other ministers. The Tongan government proceeded to sue Bogdonoff and all the parties involved in the transaction for fraud and negligence. Without admitting guilt of any fraud, Bogdonoff settled his part of the lawsuit in 2004. He agreed to pay Tonga US$100,000, a percentage of his income until 2014, and 50 per cent of the proceeds of any future book or movie deal about his time as court jester, plus any gambling winnings or inheritance.

== Post-scandal life ==
As of 2006, Bogdonoff has not been to Tonga since 2004 due to his history there. That year, under the name Jesse Dean, he founded the Open Window Institute of Emotional Freedom in Sonoma County, California, offering classes in hypnosis and using hypnosis to aid in recovery from post traumatic stress.

In 2009, the scandal was turned into a play by writer Joseph Silovsky.

== Jester ==
Bogdonoff's status as official court jester of Tupou's court made sensational news when the financial scandal hit the media in 2001. Tonga was the first royal court to appoint a court jester in modern times, doing so in 1999. Bogdonoff claimed he was made court jester at his own suggestion, because his birthday is April 1 (April Fools' Day) — with the aim of promoting Tonga as a tourist destination.
