= Nigel Roder =

British comedian

Nigel Roder (born 1967), also known professionally as Kester the Jester, was designated the official "State Jester" of England in 2004 by English Heritage. The prior jester of record, Muckle John, vacated the position shortly after his employer, King Charles I of England, was beheaded in 1649.

Roder was appointed by English Heritage after winning a jesting competition. Subsequently, the Guild of Jesters complained through their spokesman, Jonathan the Jester, that English Heritage should not be allowed to use the title of State Jester. Several guild members also wrote to their MPs. After the question was raised in Parliament, Kester's title was amended to "English Heritage Jester".

Nigel Roder is currently working throughout the United Kingdom as an entertainer both in his jester role and as a teacher of circus skills workshops. He is one of the founders and regular trainers of the voluntary youth circus Concrete Circus (founded 2009).

Nigel has been referenced by two BBC quizzes. The Weakest Link (2005) in which he was mentioned as a question and QI (2014) in their 13th podcast.

Nigel Roder is on the Board of Directors of CircusWorks, the network for youth circus in the UK. As part of this he has helped organise specialist workshops and the youth circus show at the British Juggling Conventions 2014 and 2015.
