= You Meng =

You Meng (Chinese: 優孟; pinyin: Yōu Mèng; lit. 'Performer Meng', fl. 590s BC), also commonly translated as Jester Meng, was a court musician and entertainer in the service of King Zhuang of Chu (reigned 613–591 BC). He is regarded as China's first actor, and the expression "You Meng's robes and cap" (Chinese: 優孟衣冠, romanized: Yōu Mèng yīguān) is still used to refer to theater and acting.

Once, King Zhuang decided on an elaborate funeral for his favorite horse (which died of obesity) "with outer and inner coffins and the rites appropriate to a minister." Anyone who dared to challenge this decision was to be executed. You Meng entered the palace with a loud cry and "advised" the king to make the burial even more lavish, "establish an ancestral temple, sacrifice a tailao, and institute a fief of ten thousand households to provide the offerings." The king realized that he went too far and following You Meng's recommendation, had the horse cooked and fed to his courtiers, as was the proper conduct.

Before the prime minister Sunshu Ao died in c. 593 BC, he treated You Meng well. After his death, his family was reduced to poverty. One day, You Meng ran into his son gathering firewood and decided to help him. He imitated Sunshu Ao's speech and manners for a year until men could not tell the difference. During a banquet, wearing Sunshu Ao's robes and cap, he appeared before King Zhuang as "Sunshu Ao". The king was shocked and wanted "Sunshu Ao" back in his government; but "Sunshu Ao" replied that he needed to go home and discuss it with his wife first. A few days later, You Meng returned and told the king that the wife objected because despite having served with total dedication and loyalty, Sunshu Ao died without any property and his son had to gather firewood to make ends meet. He followed this remonstration with a song. The king then gave Sunshu Ao's son a piece of land.
