= Silly Billy =

Type of clown in 19th-century England

A vintage picture postcard of a Silly Billy

Silly Billy was a type of clown common at fairs in England during the 19th century. They were also common in London as street entertainers, along with the similar clown, Billy Barlow. The act included playing the part of a fool or idiot, impersonating a child and singing comic songs. The role was typically played as a stooge to another clown.

The name is popular because of its nice rhyme and was used as a generic nickname for foolish people, especially those named William such as Prince William Frederick and King William IV. The nickname was popularised in the 1970s by impressionist Mike Yarwood, putting it in the mouth of the chancellor, Denis Healey, who took the catchphrase up and used it as his own.

In 1850, the costume of a Silly Billy was short, white trousers with a long white pinafore, white shoes with a strap around the ankle, red sleeves, a ruff around the neck, and a boy's cap. The hair or wig was arranged to stick out behind the ears. Red makeup was daubed to emphasise the nose with two smears of black for the eyebrows. Multiple pairs of white trousers were needed because women liked to tease the clown by smearing gingerbread or sticking pins into his legs so that they bled.

Comic routines included a mesmerism act in which Silly Billy was hypnotised, a parody of a preacher giving a sermon, and a parody of a temperance campaign. Comic songs included O'ive getten a Soft Pleace i' my Yead and Dolly and the Swill Tub.

The wages of a Silly Billy at the time were about two or three half-crowns per day, averaging about a pound a week, over the year. About a dozen performers made their living in this way in the London area.

== See also ==
- Commedia dell'arte
