= Marotte =

Mock sceptre used by jesters

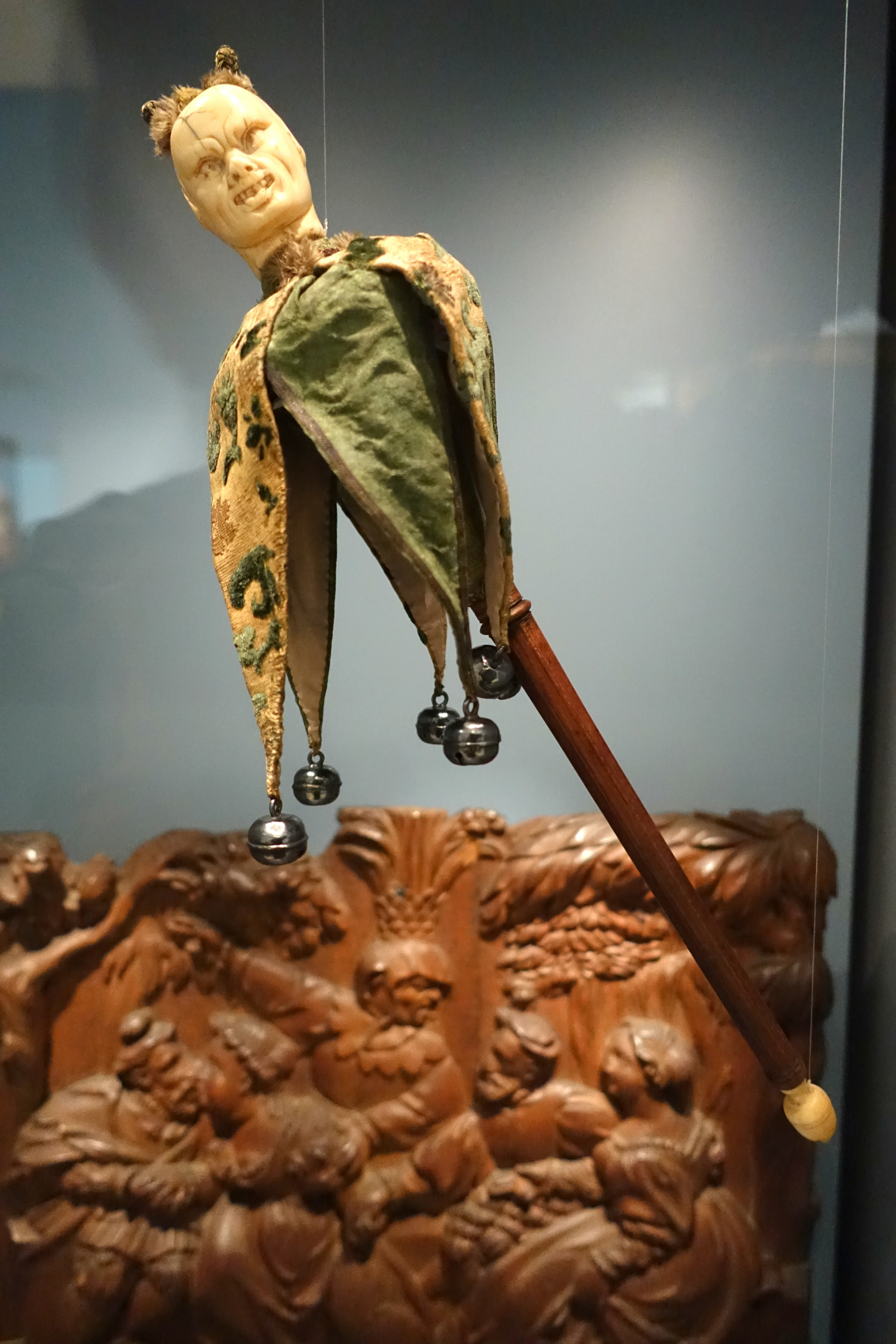
Fool's scepter, Germany or France, 1565–1600 in Germanisches National Museum - Nuremberg, Germany

A marotte is a prop stick or sceptre with a carved head on it. Jesters usually used a marotte. The word is borrowed from the French, where it signifies either a fool's (literal) "bauble" or a fad.

Typically carried by a jester or Arlecchino, the miniature head often reflects the costume of the jester who carries it. Modern marottes typically have music boxes or other machinery built into the head. Older marottes may utilize swivel heads with bells.

== In popular culture ==
In Verdi's opera Rigoletto, the singer of the title role, a jester, carries a marotte, which often has on it the faces of comedy and tragedy.

In the children's TV series Rentaghost, the ghostly jester Timothy Claypole has a marotte referred to as "Tiny Timothy".

== Gallery ==
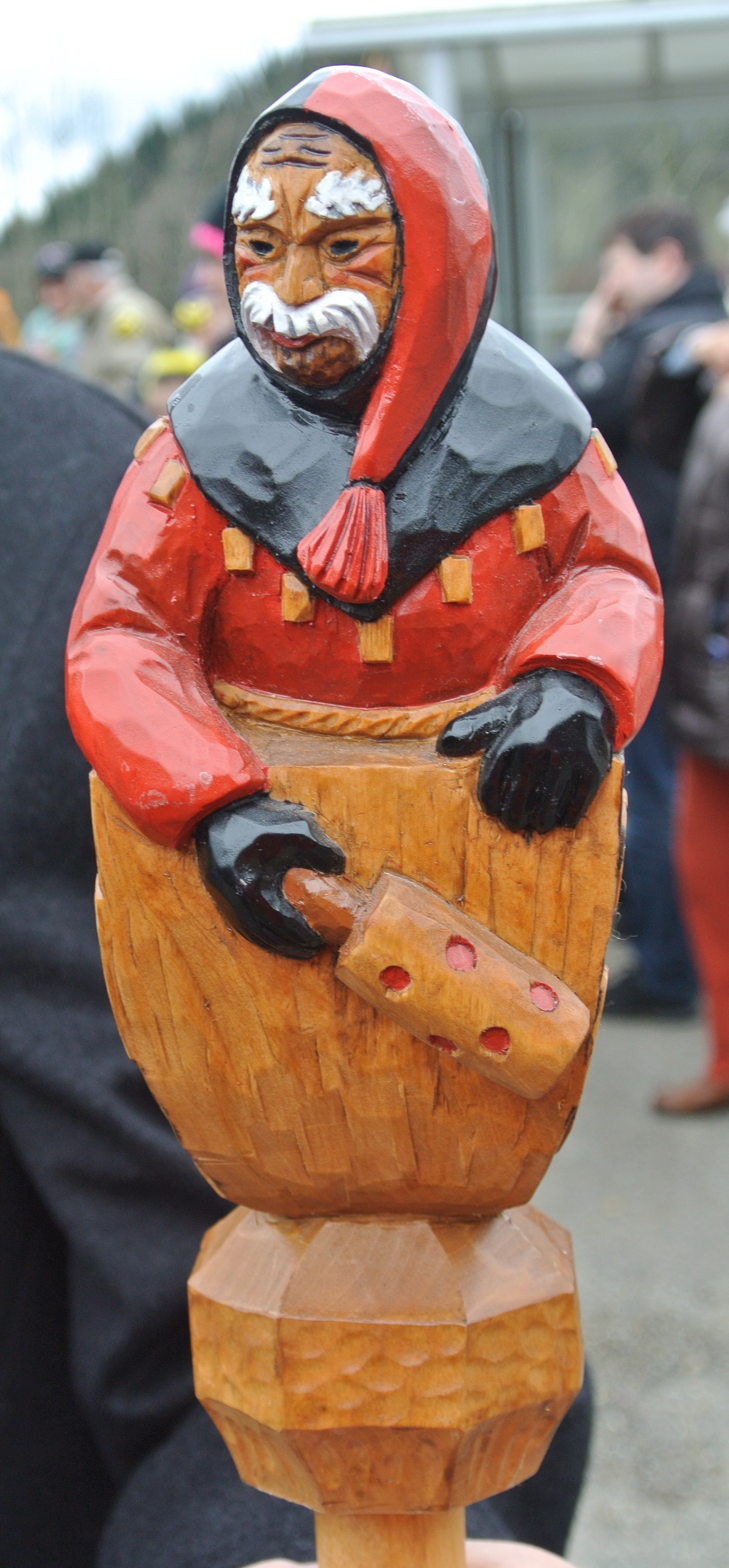
Niederwindemer Schindlejokel

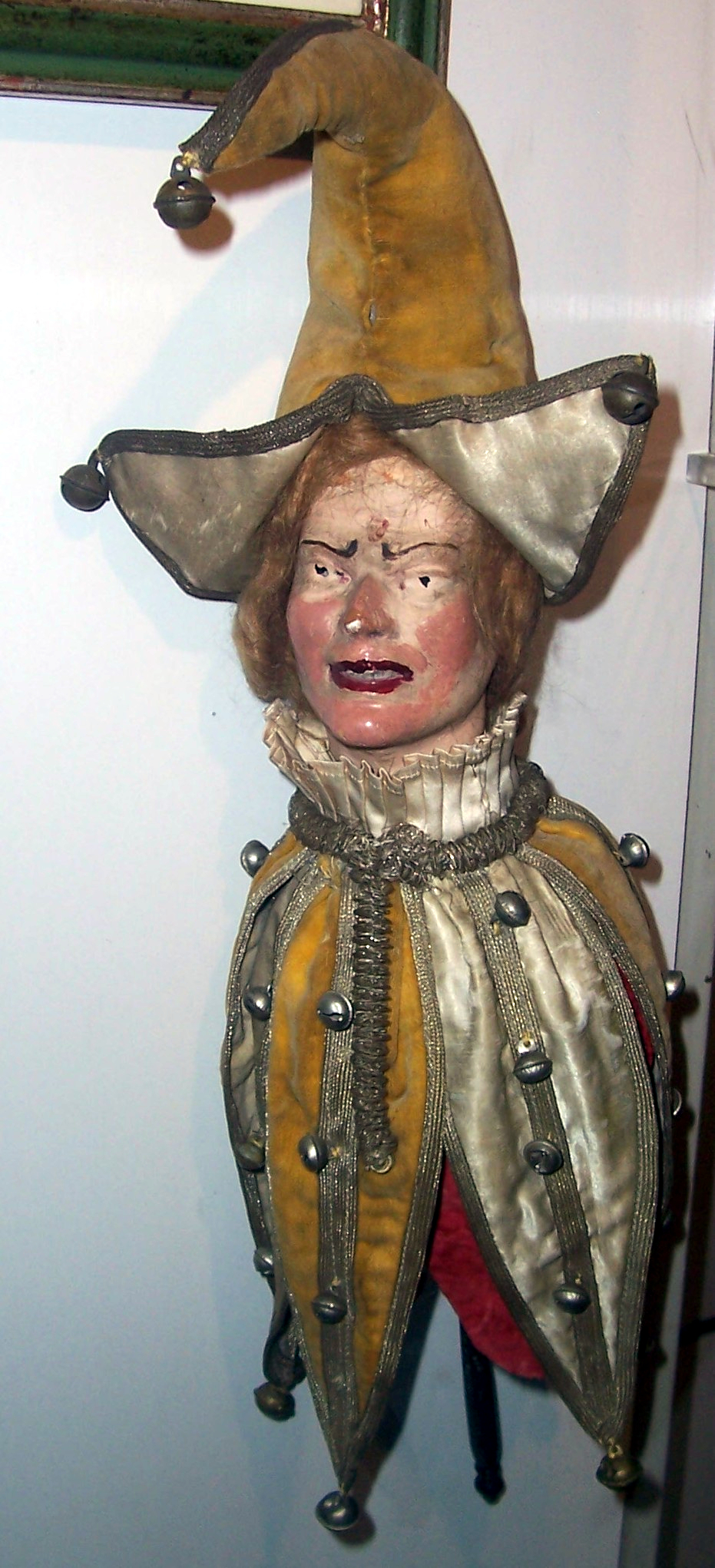
Marotte of Deutsch

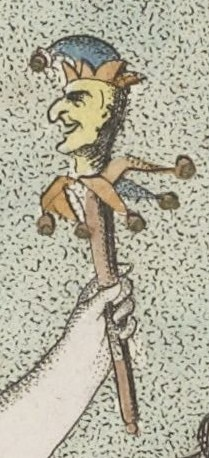
Before 1848

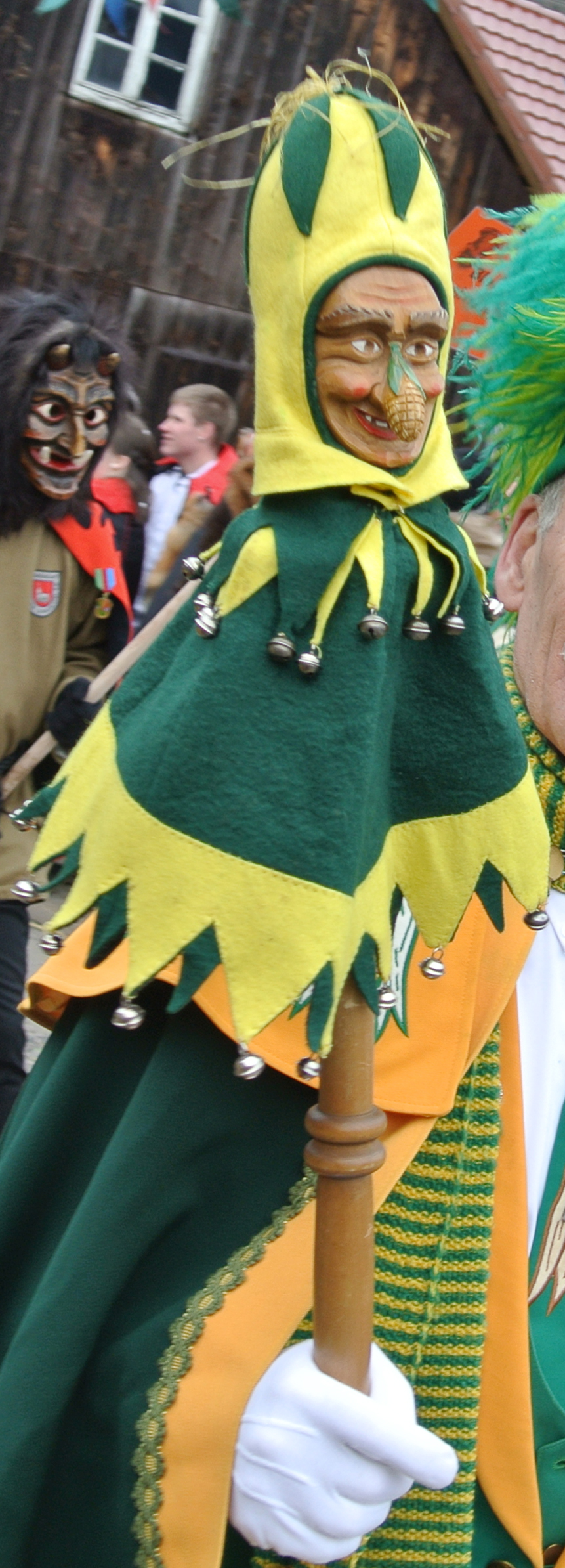
Welschkorngeister - Denzlingen

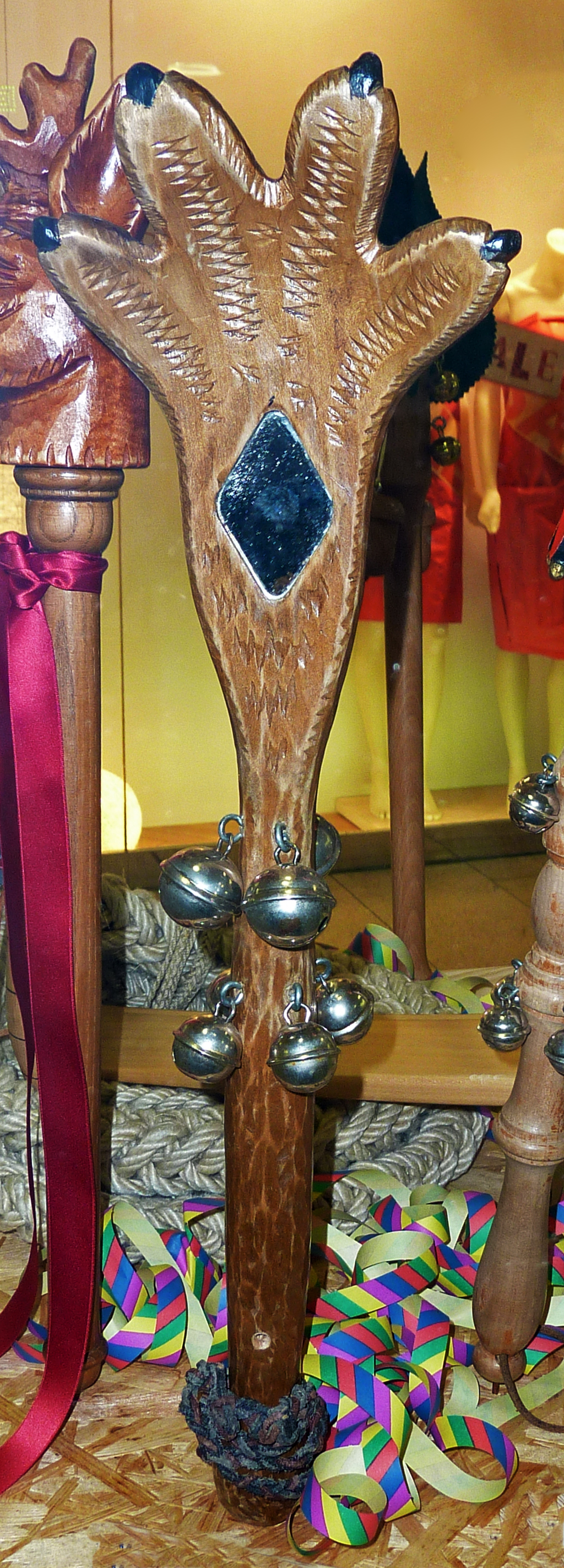
Hölle-Leue - Freiburg-Rieselfeld

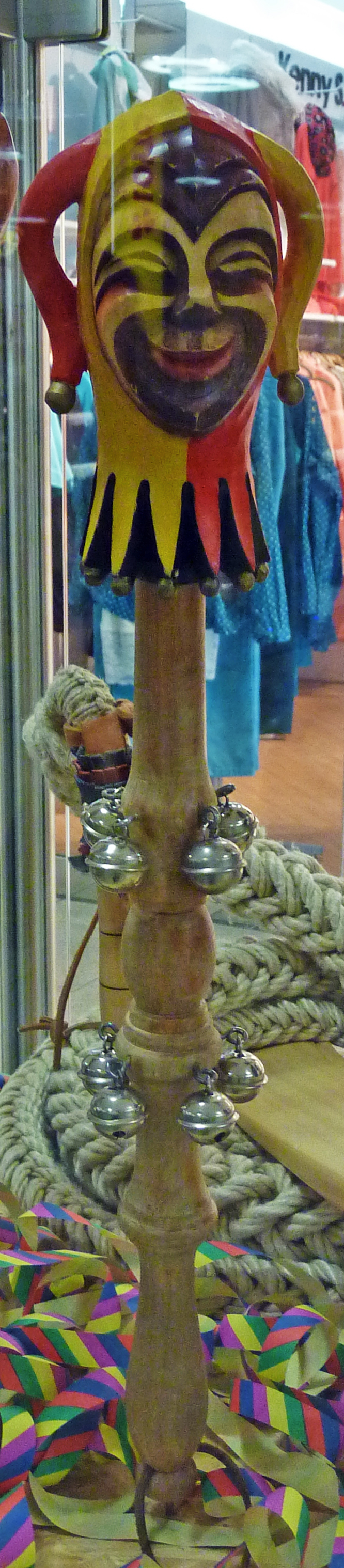
Burgnarren - Freiburg-Zähringen

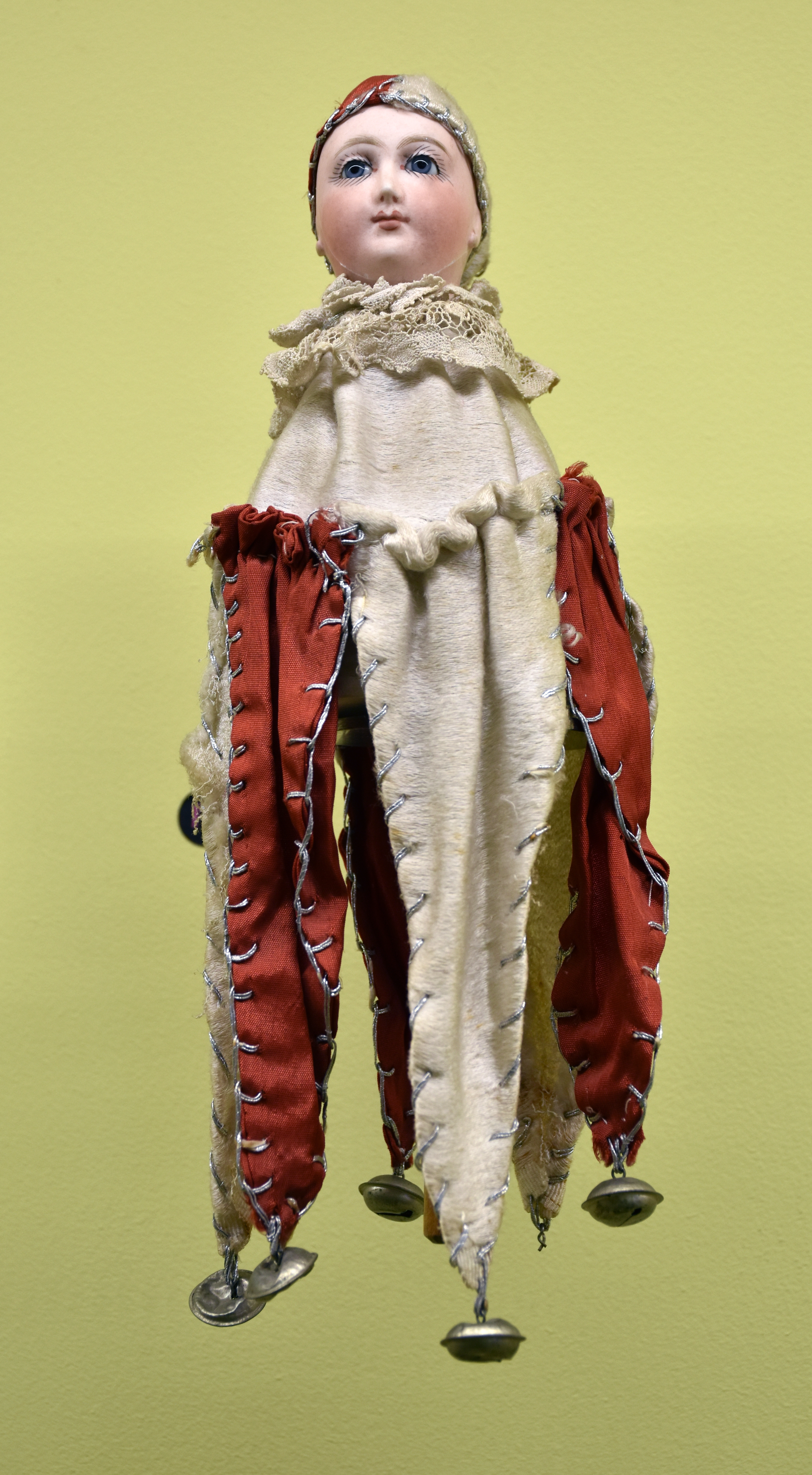
Musée du jouet de Moirans-en-Montagne

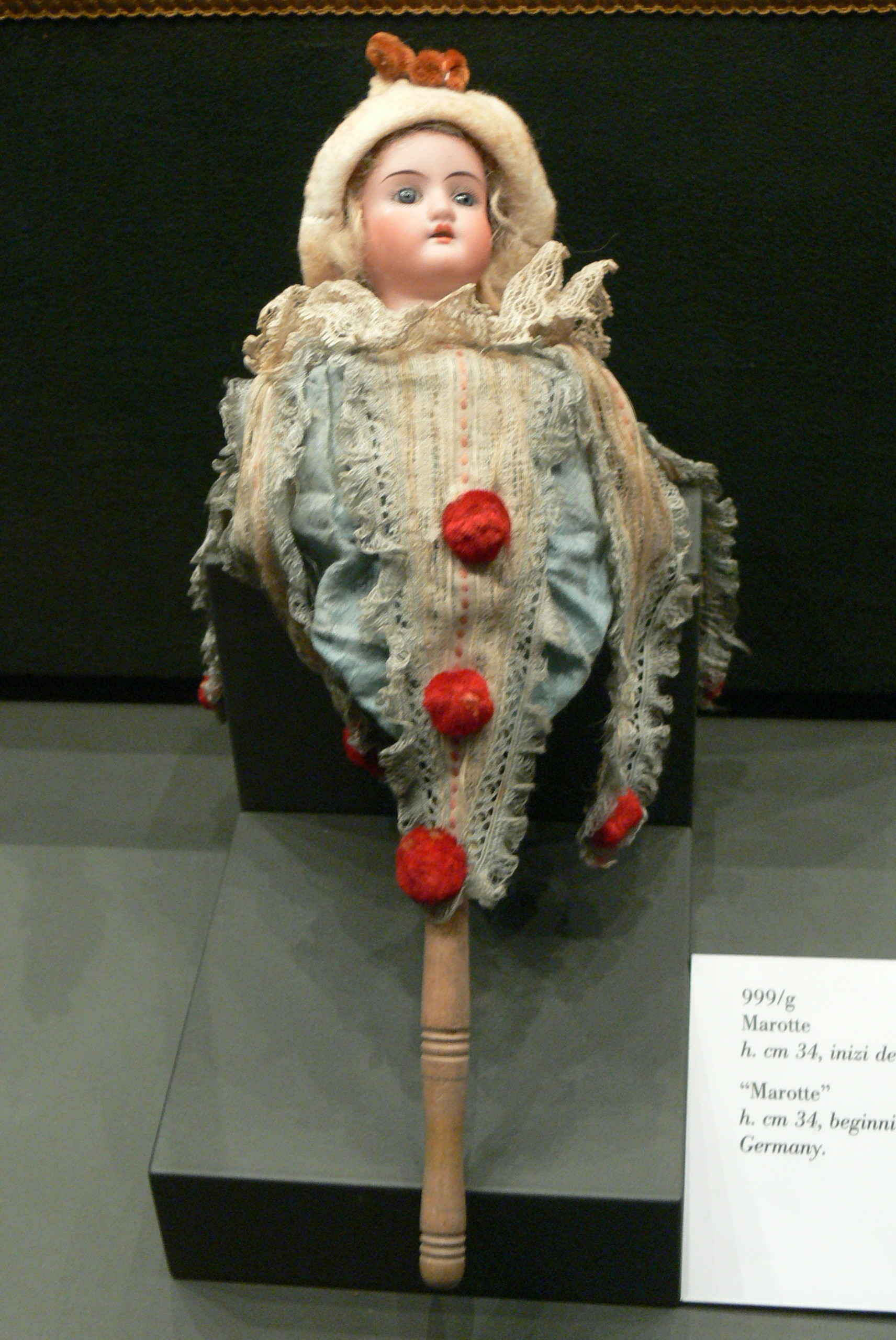
Rocca di Angera - Museo della Bambola

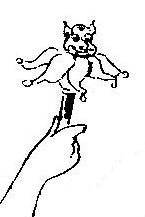
détail du dessin Le pas du Danube bleu. Caricature de Valio. Le Journal amusant 10 mars 1877

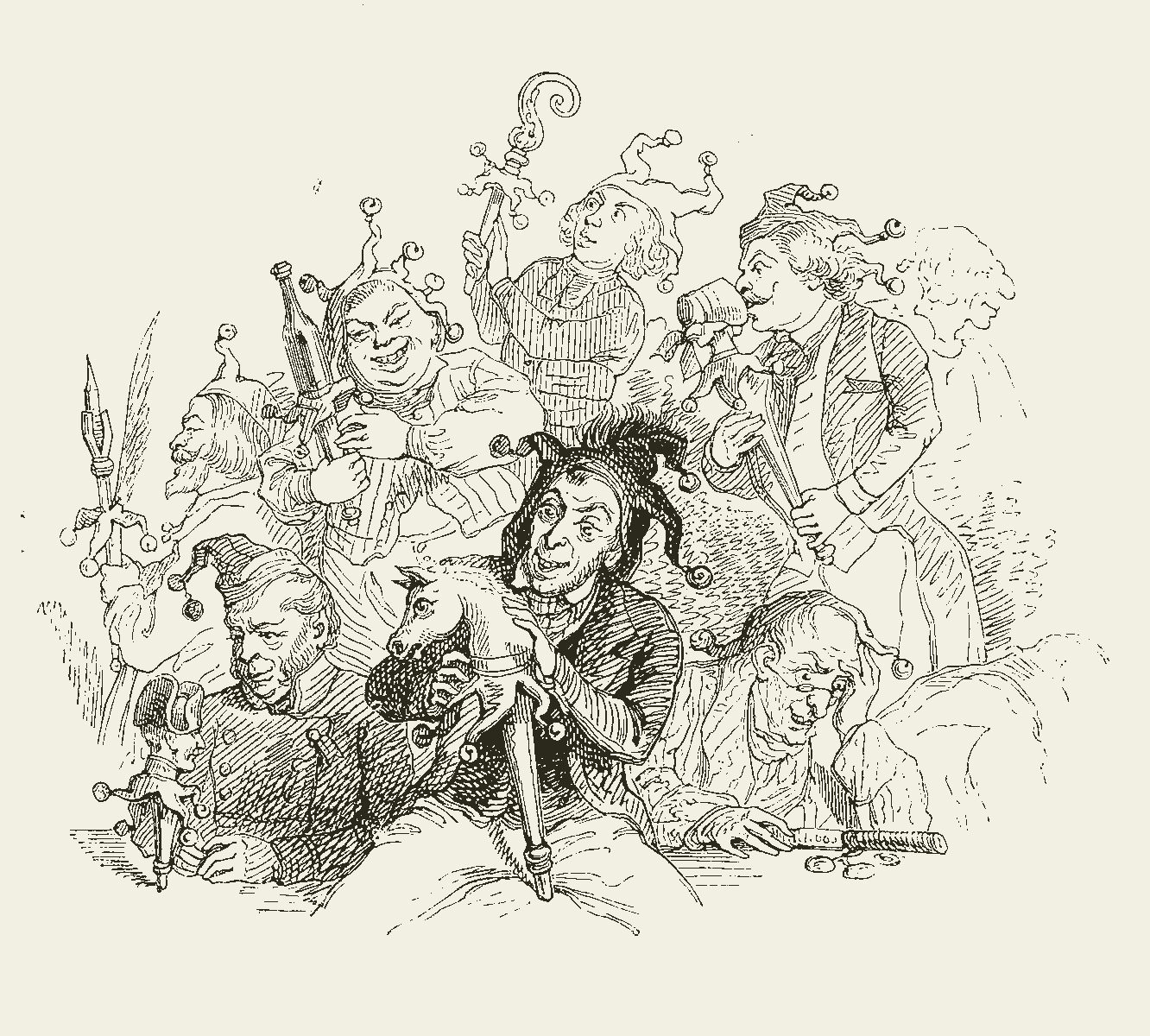
Grandville - A chaque fou plaît sa marotte

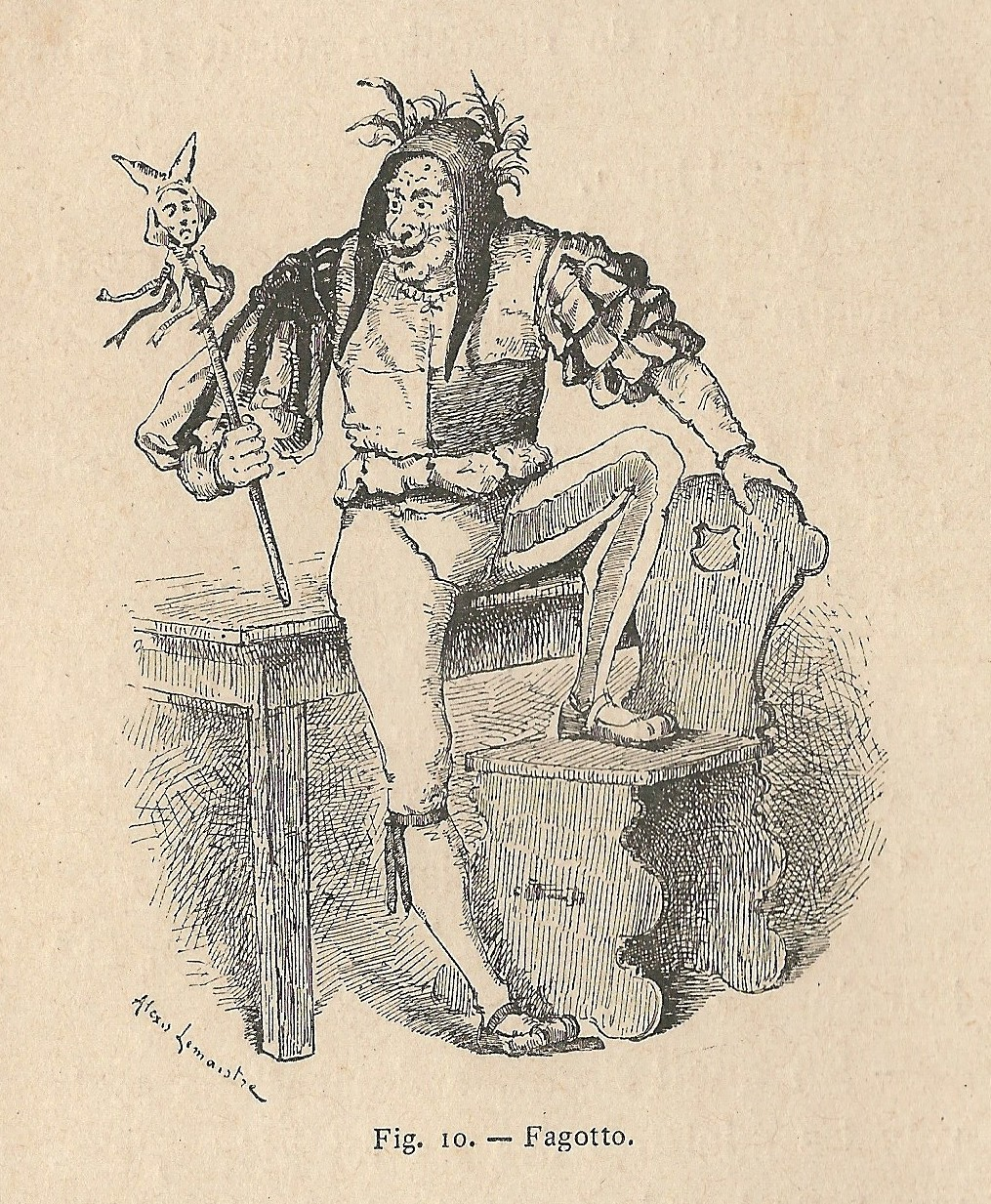
Émile Moreau-Roi et Paysan

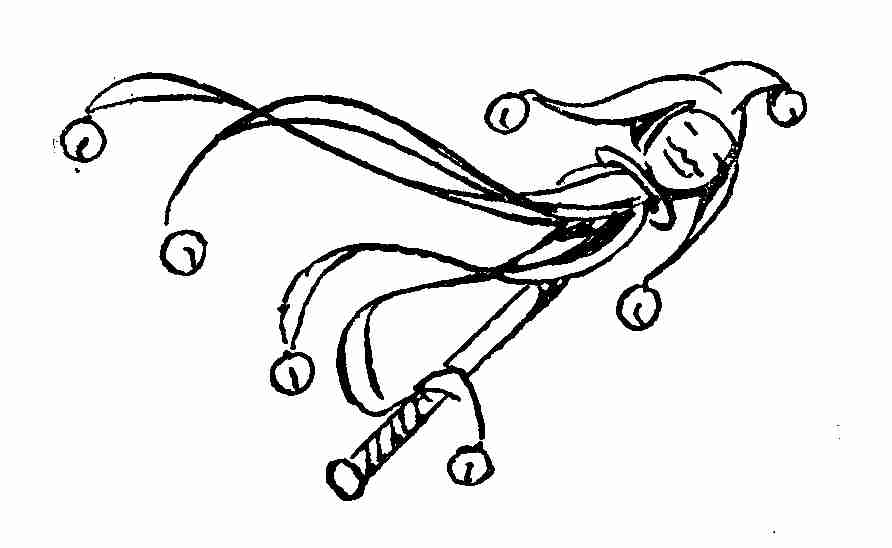
Carlègle - Les Linottes

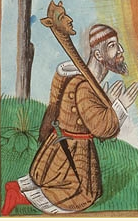
Triboulet en prière

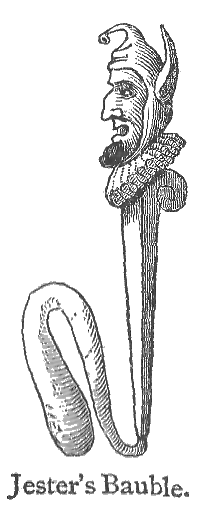
Chambers 1908 Bauble

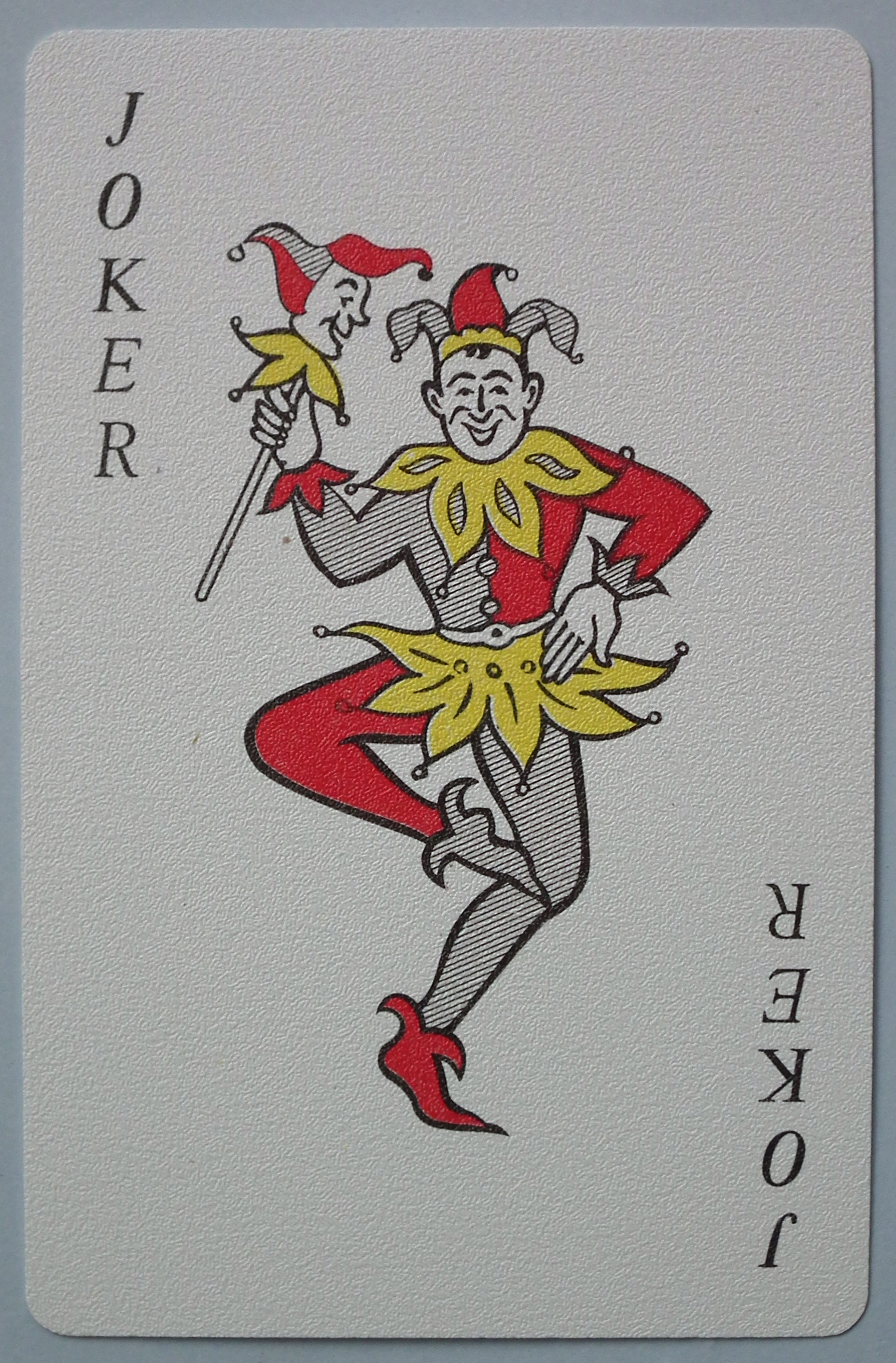
Playing Cards

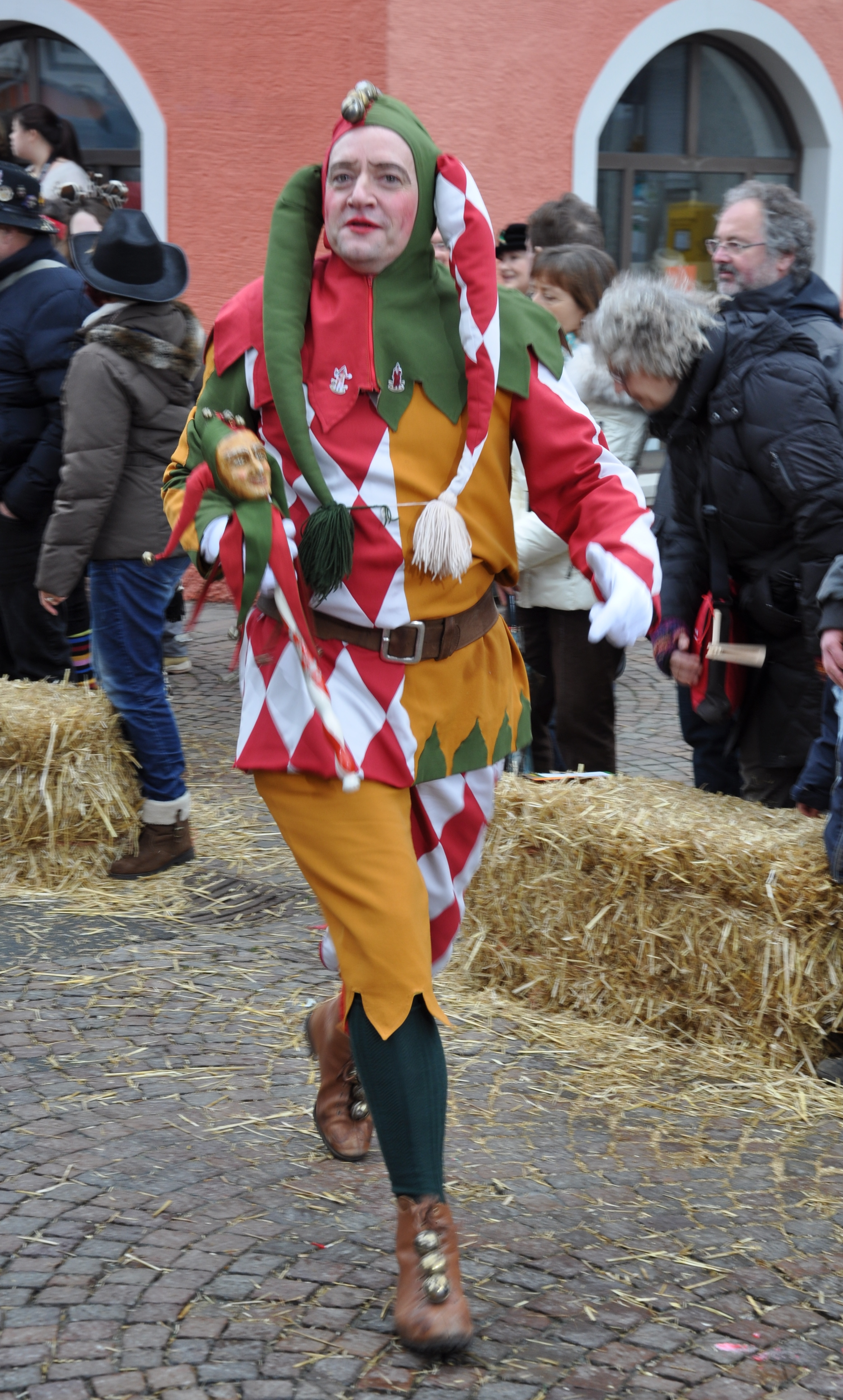
VSAN TT 2014

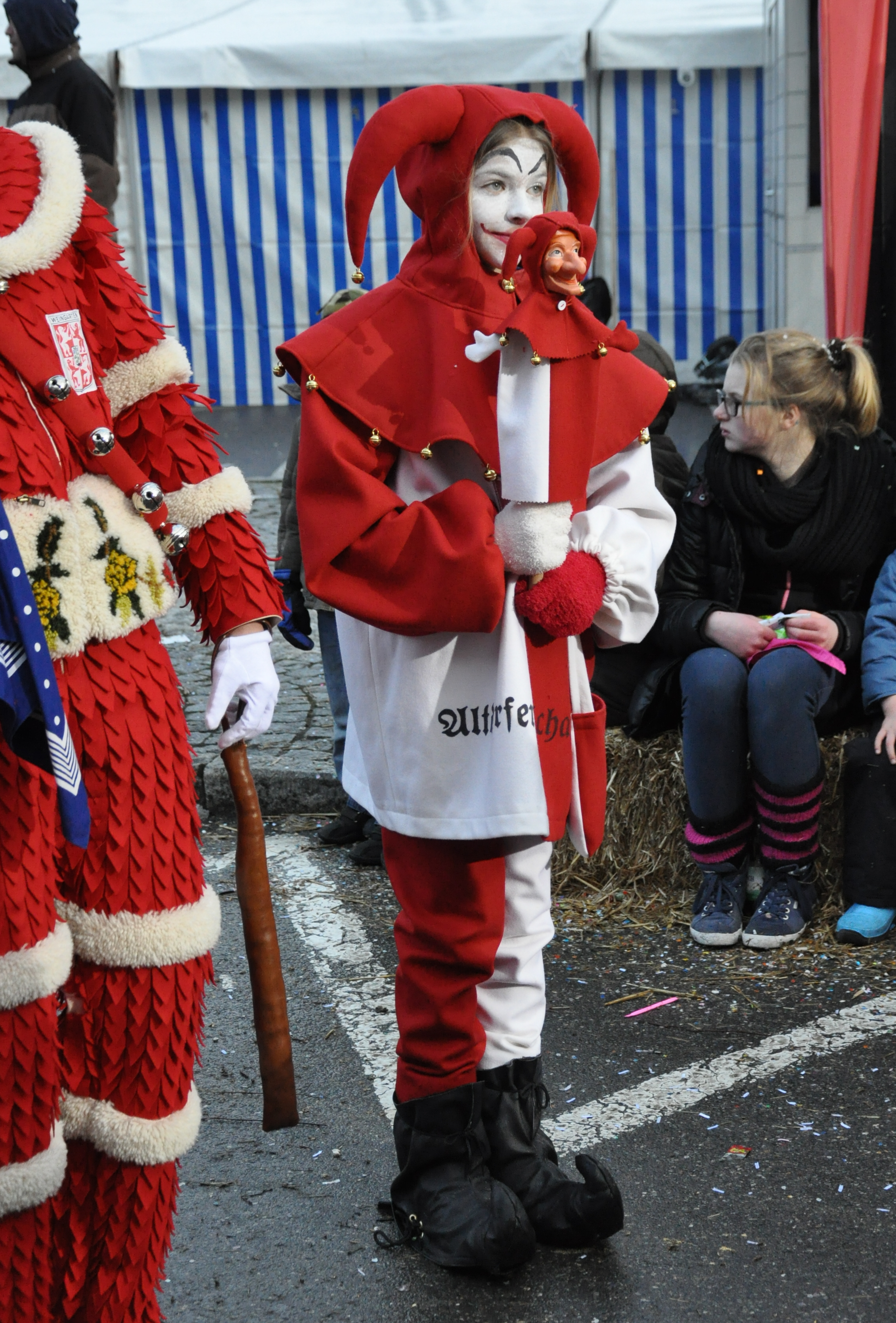
VSAN Wgt 2015 568 Schalknarr

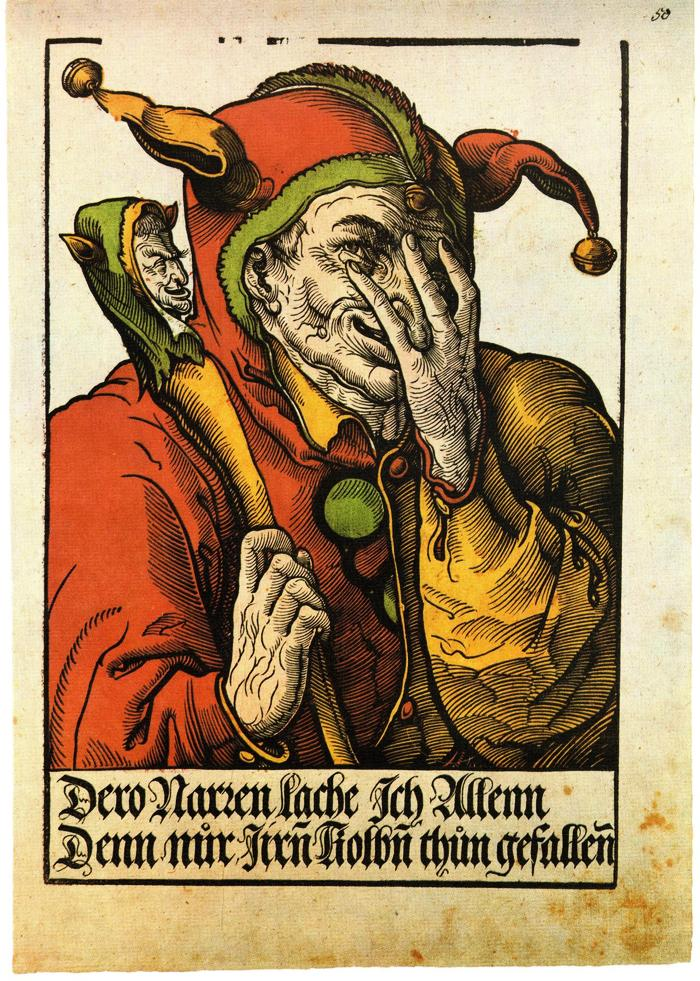
A jester shown with a marotte in a 1540 woodcut by Heinrich Vogtherr the Younger

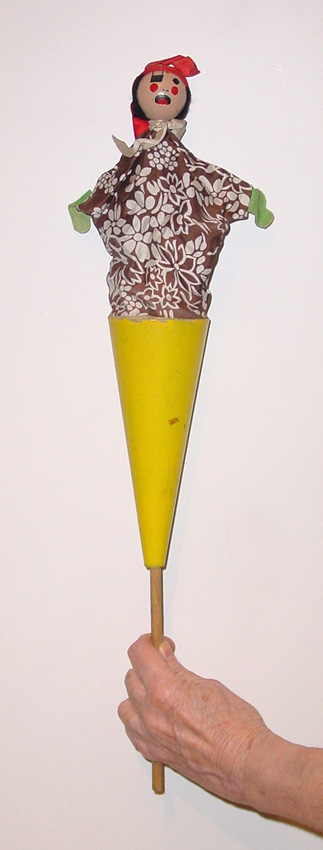
Pirata marioneta lou

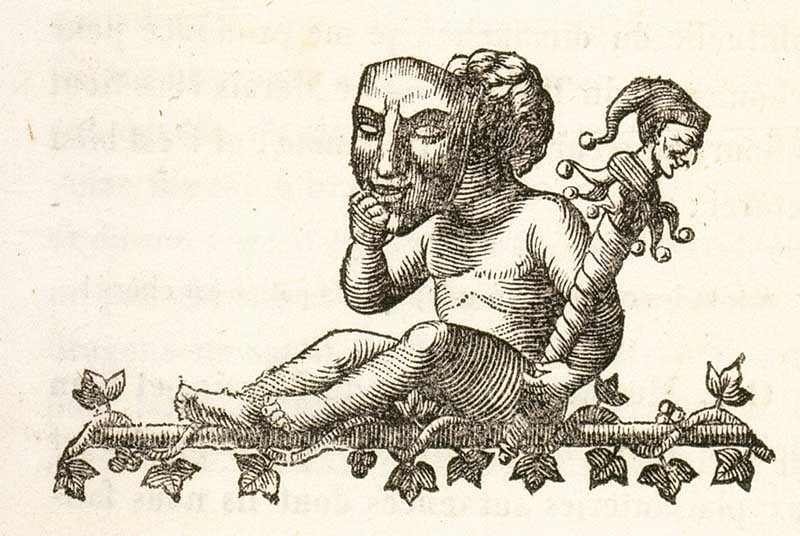
Kind mit Maske und Narrenzepter 19Jh

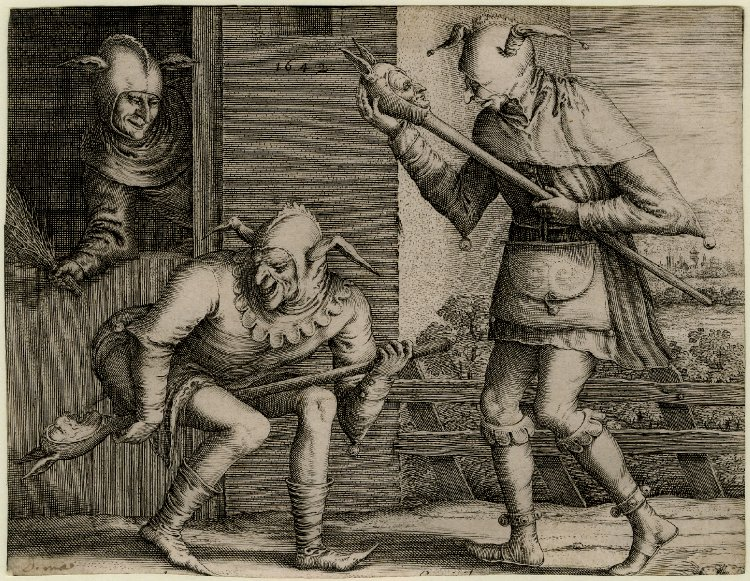
Three Fools of Carnival

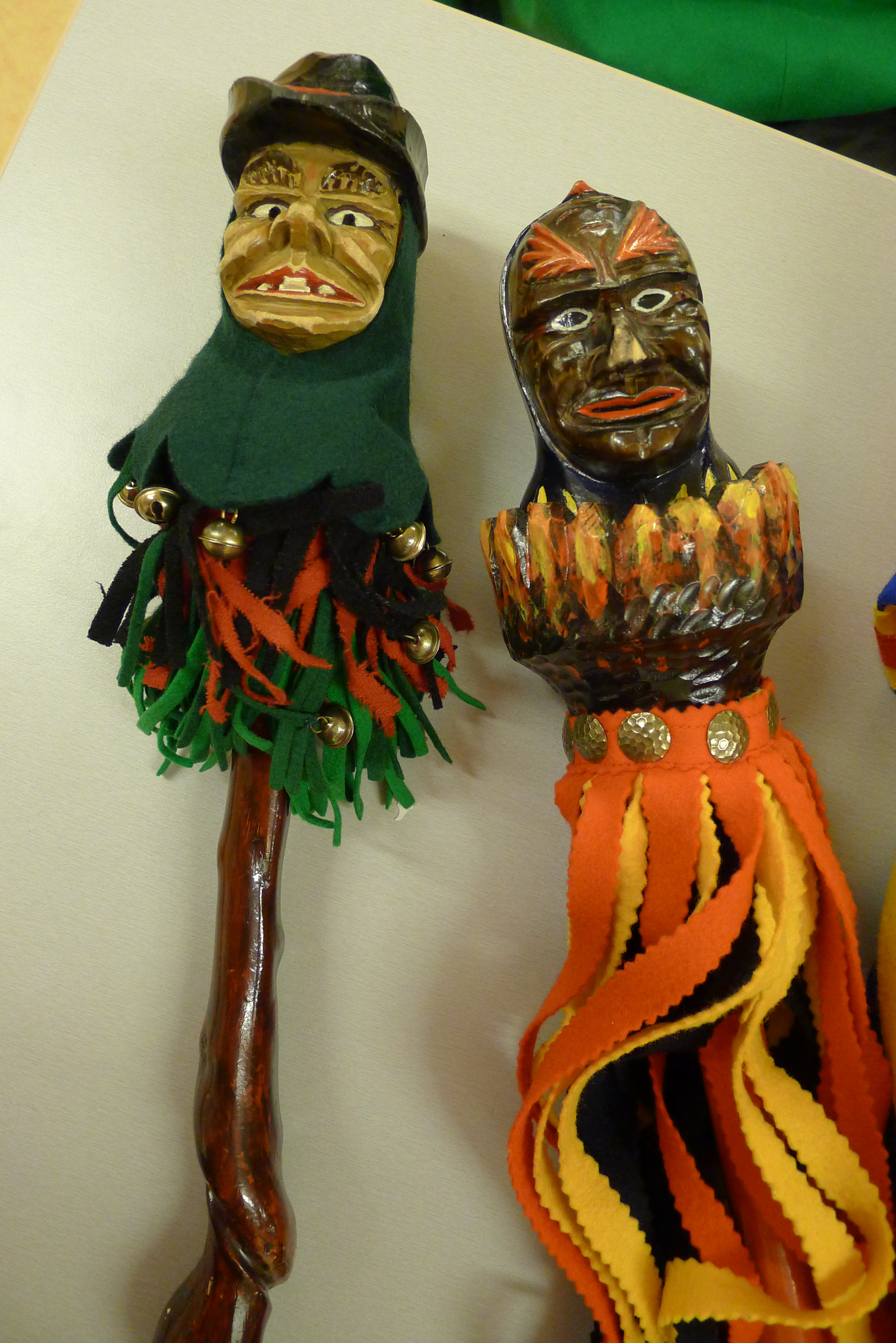
Zwei Szepter - Johli und Feuerteufel

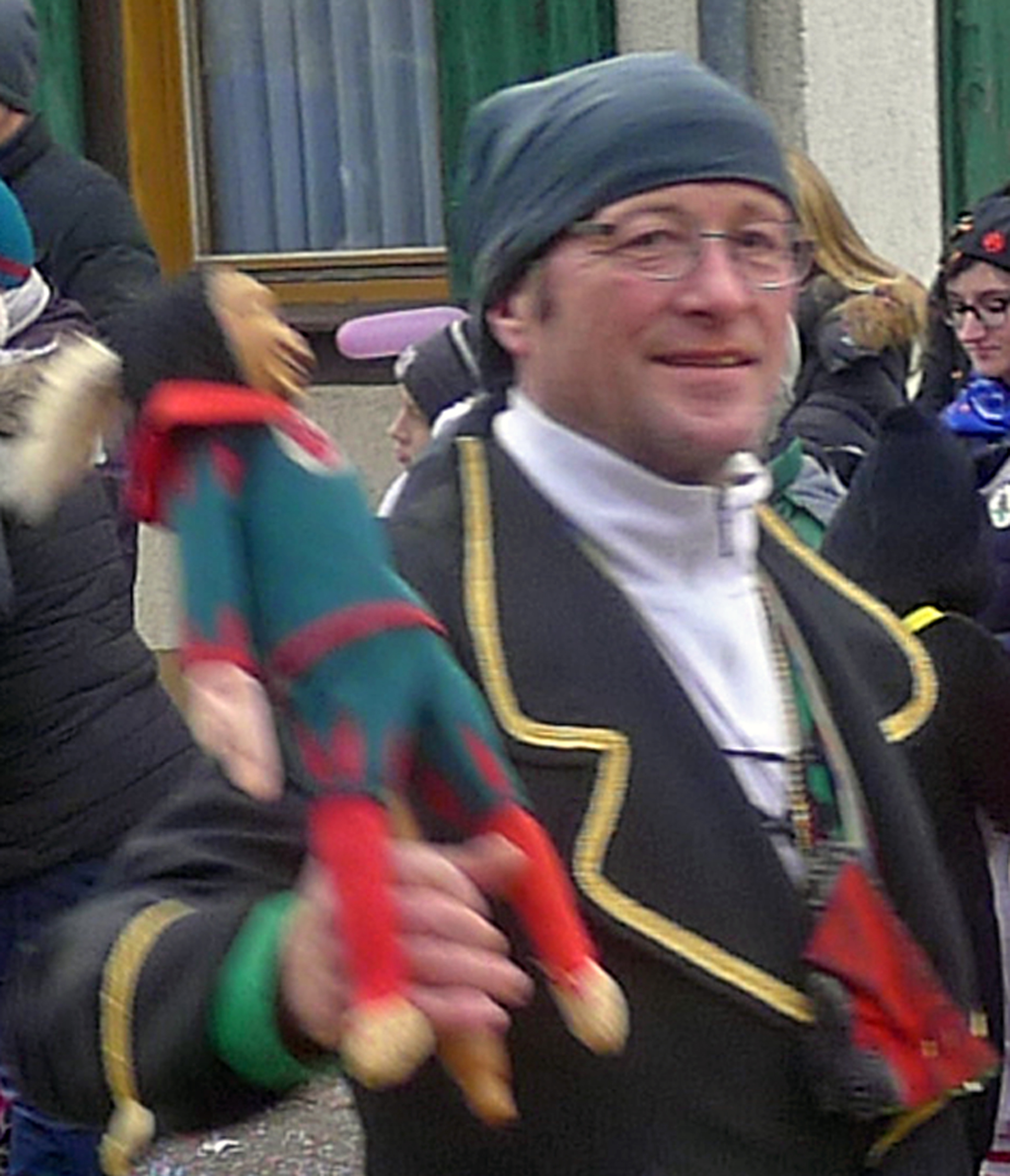
Seeräuber Titisee

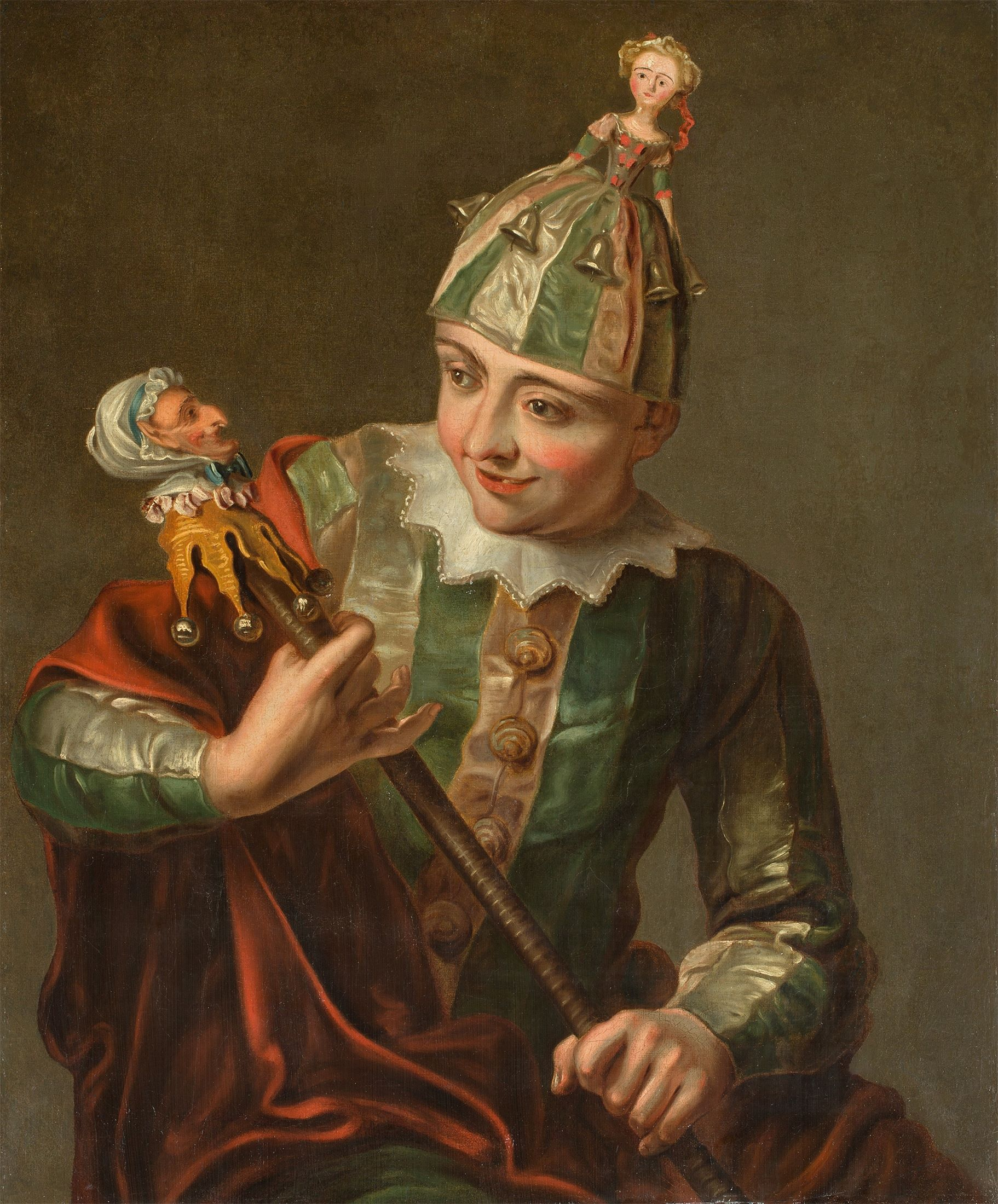
Philippe Mercier Jeune garçon en costume de folie

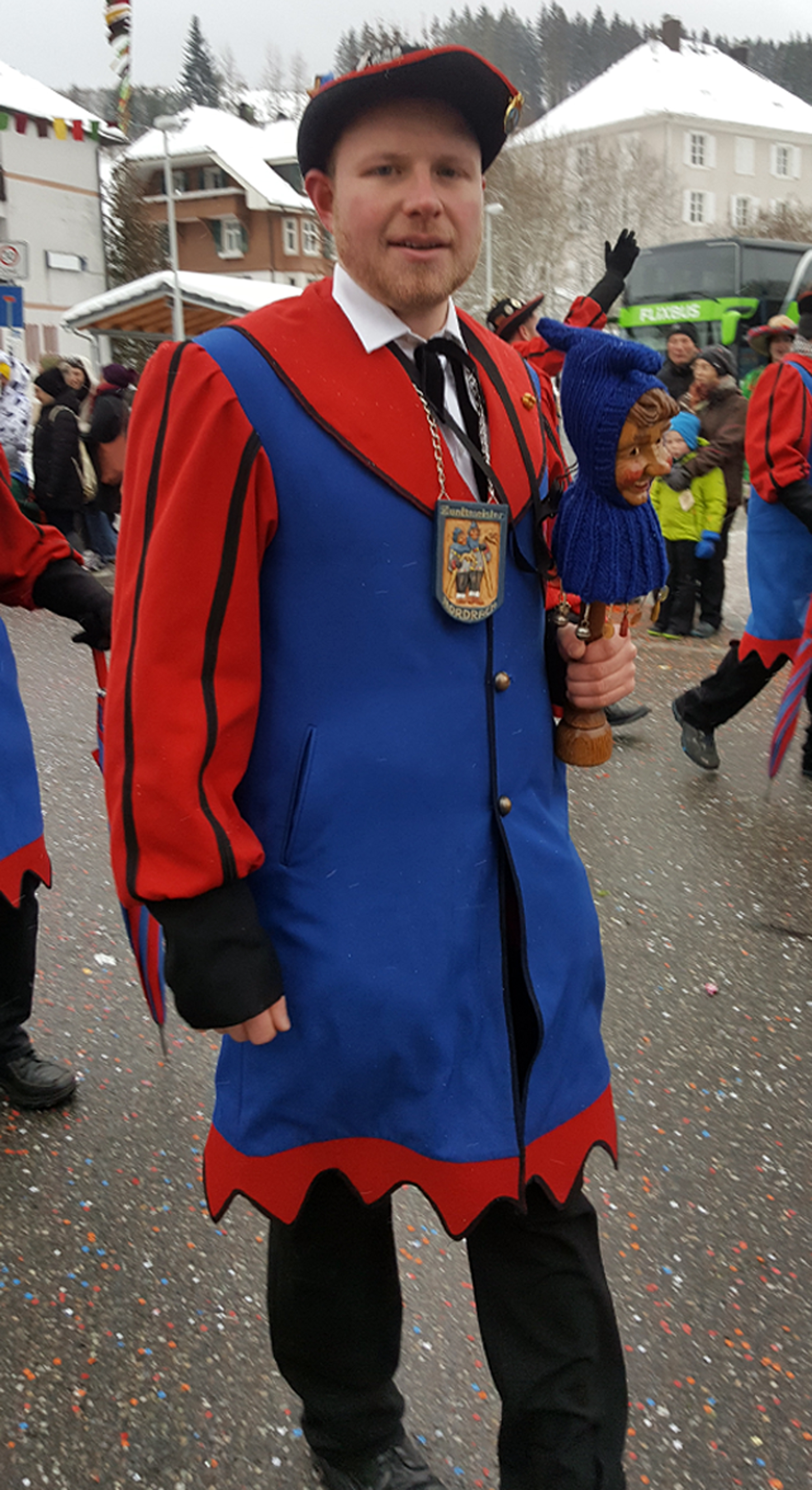
Narrenzunft Nordrach - Zunftmeister

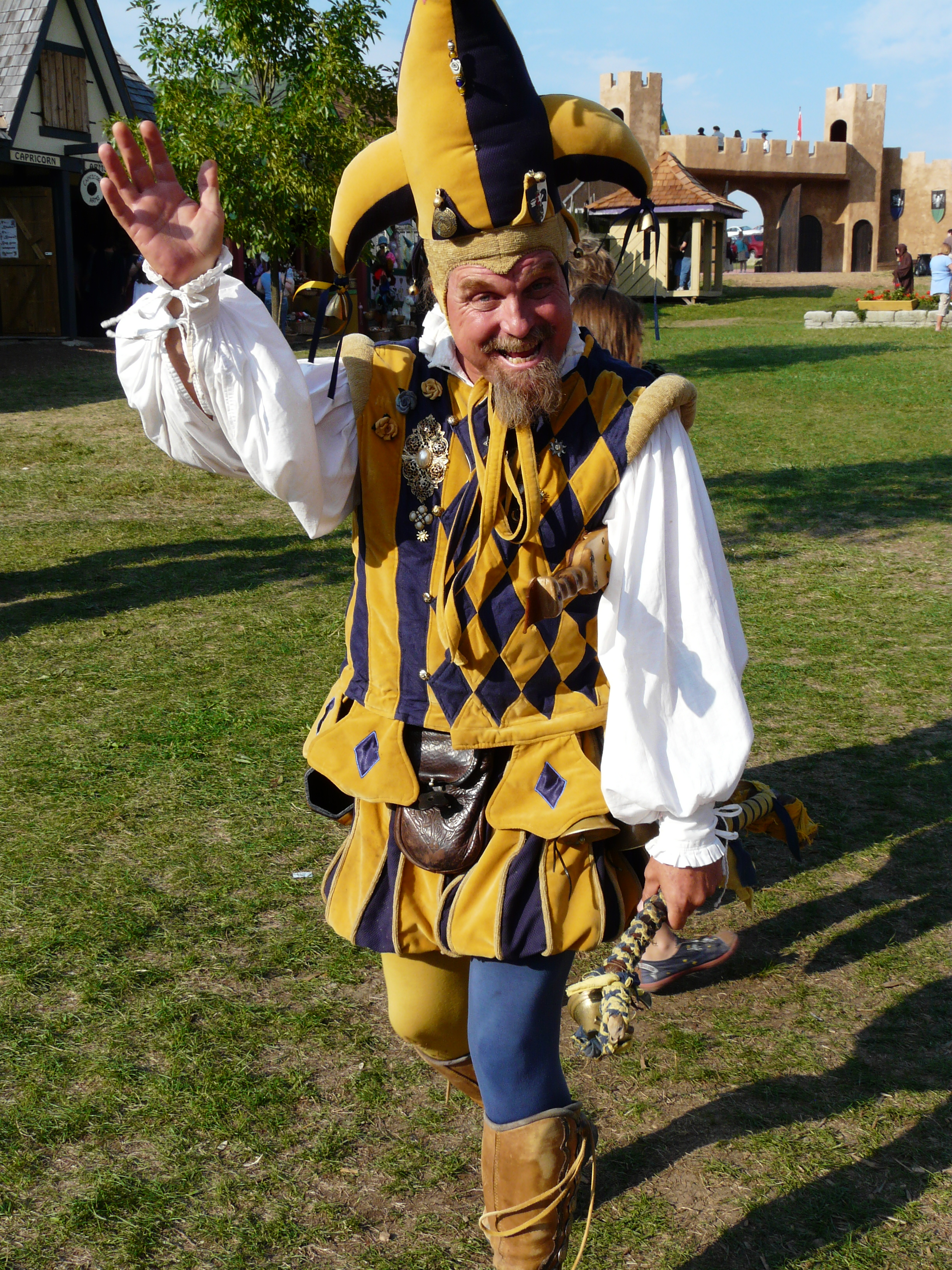
Renaissance fair

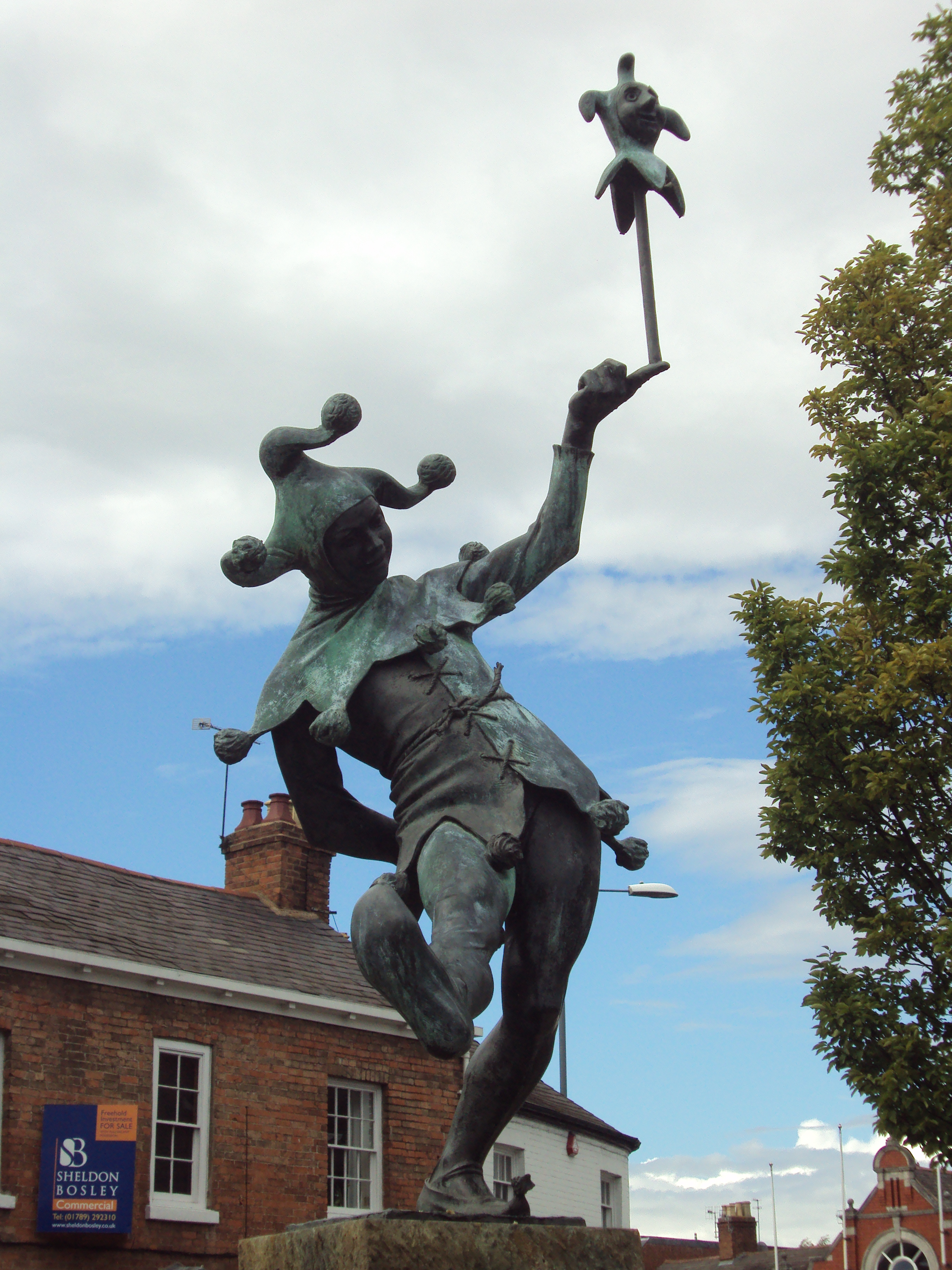
The Jester Statue on Henley Street, Stratford-upon-Avon, England.

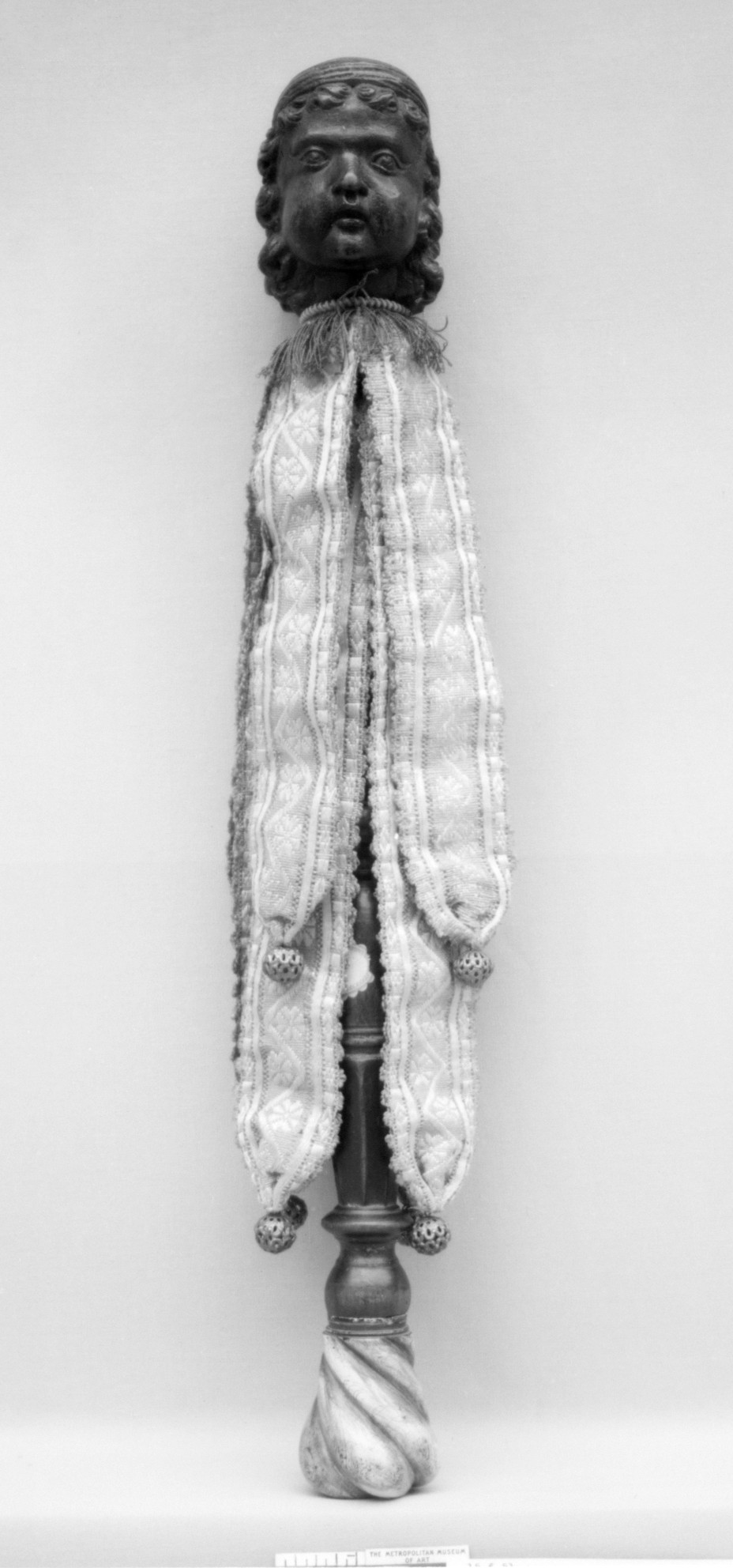
Jester's bauble

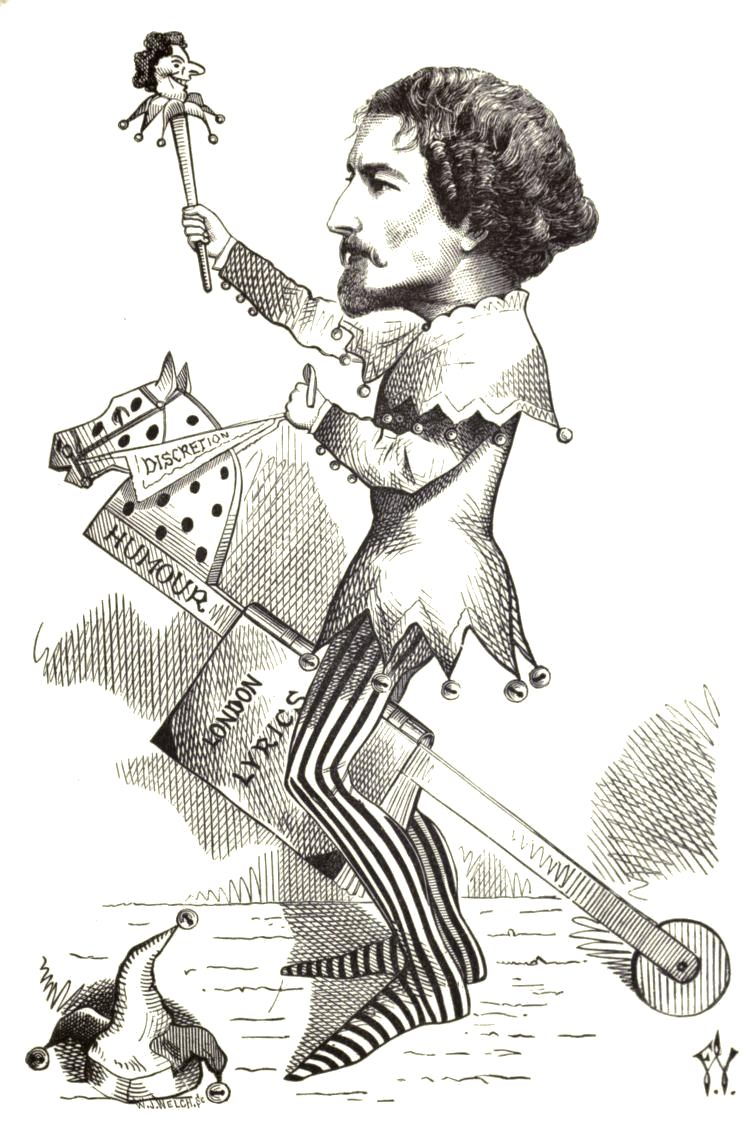
Frederick Locker (Waddy, 1872)

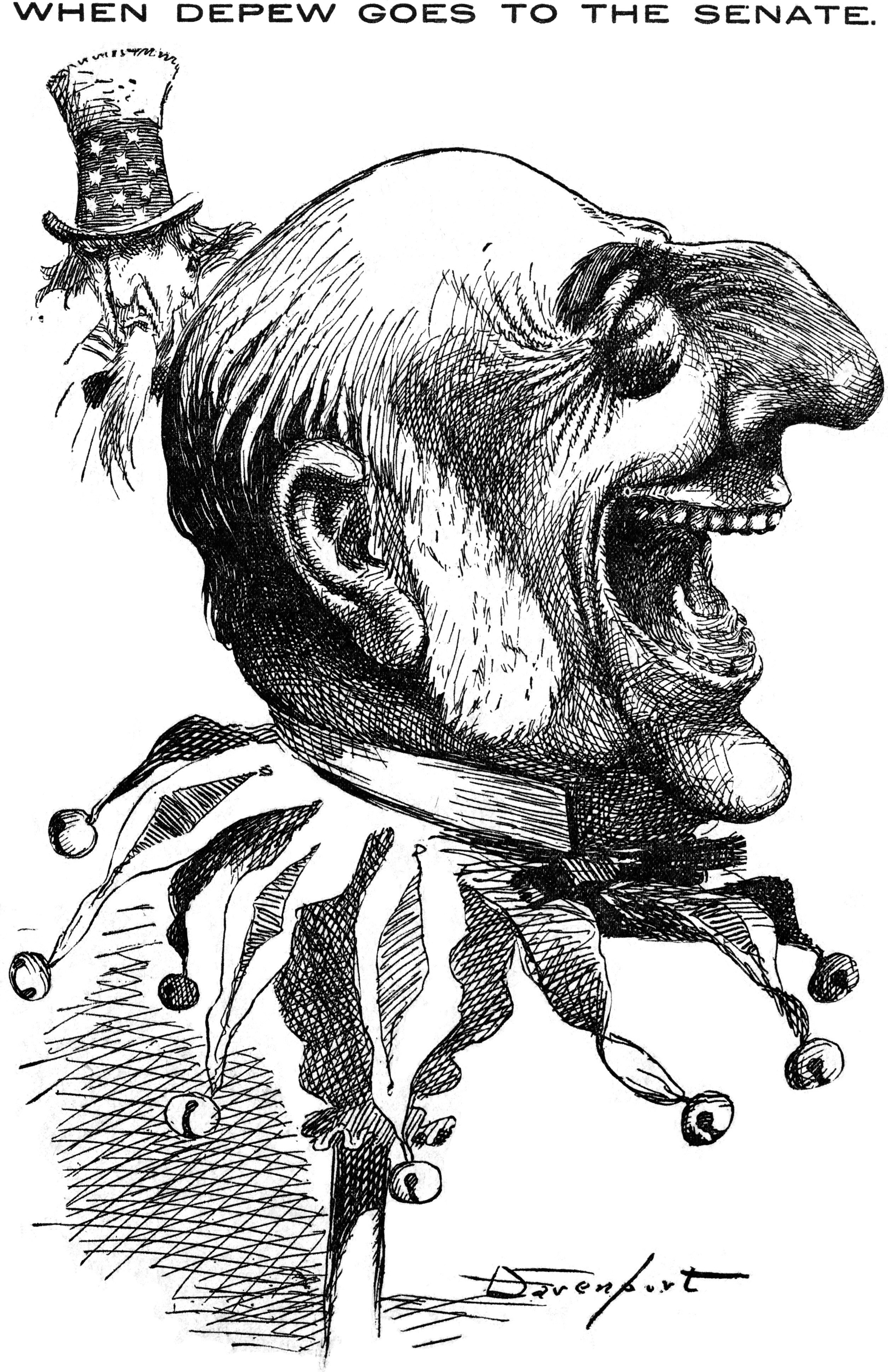
When Depew goes to the Senate by Homer Davenport (cropped)

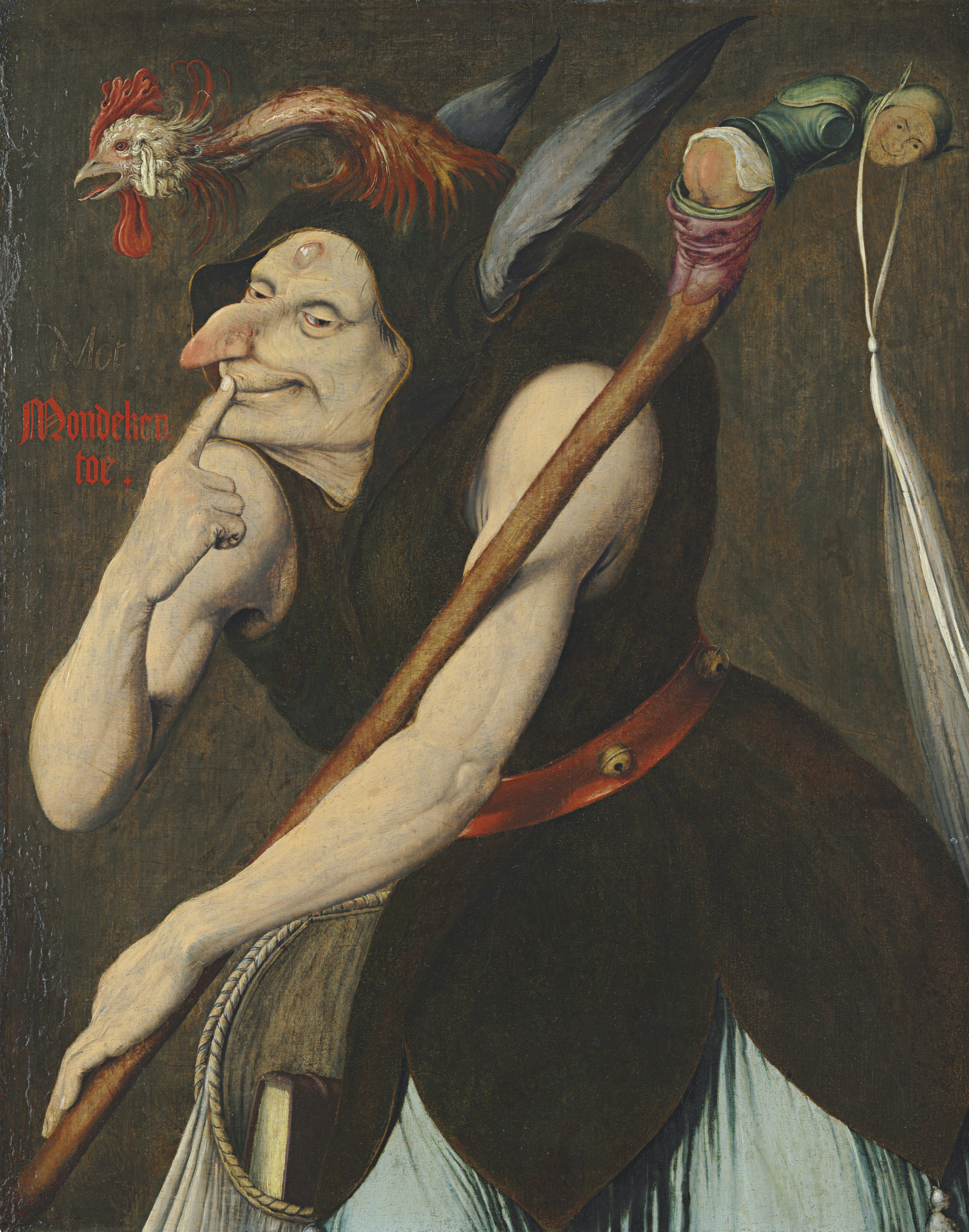
Quentin Massys

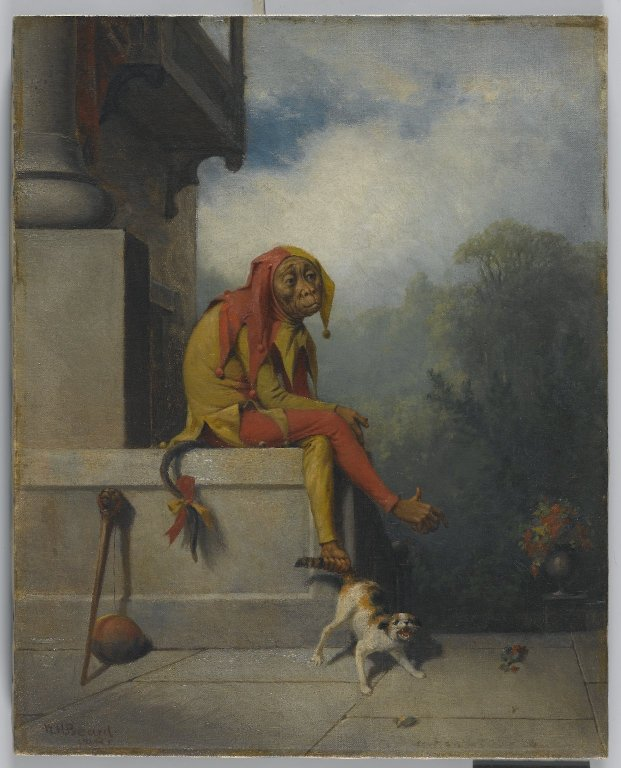
Brooklyn Museum - For What Was I Created? - William Holbrook Beard - overall

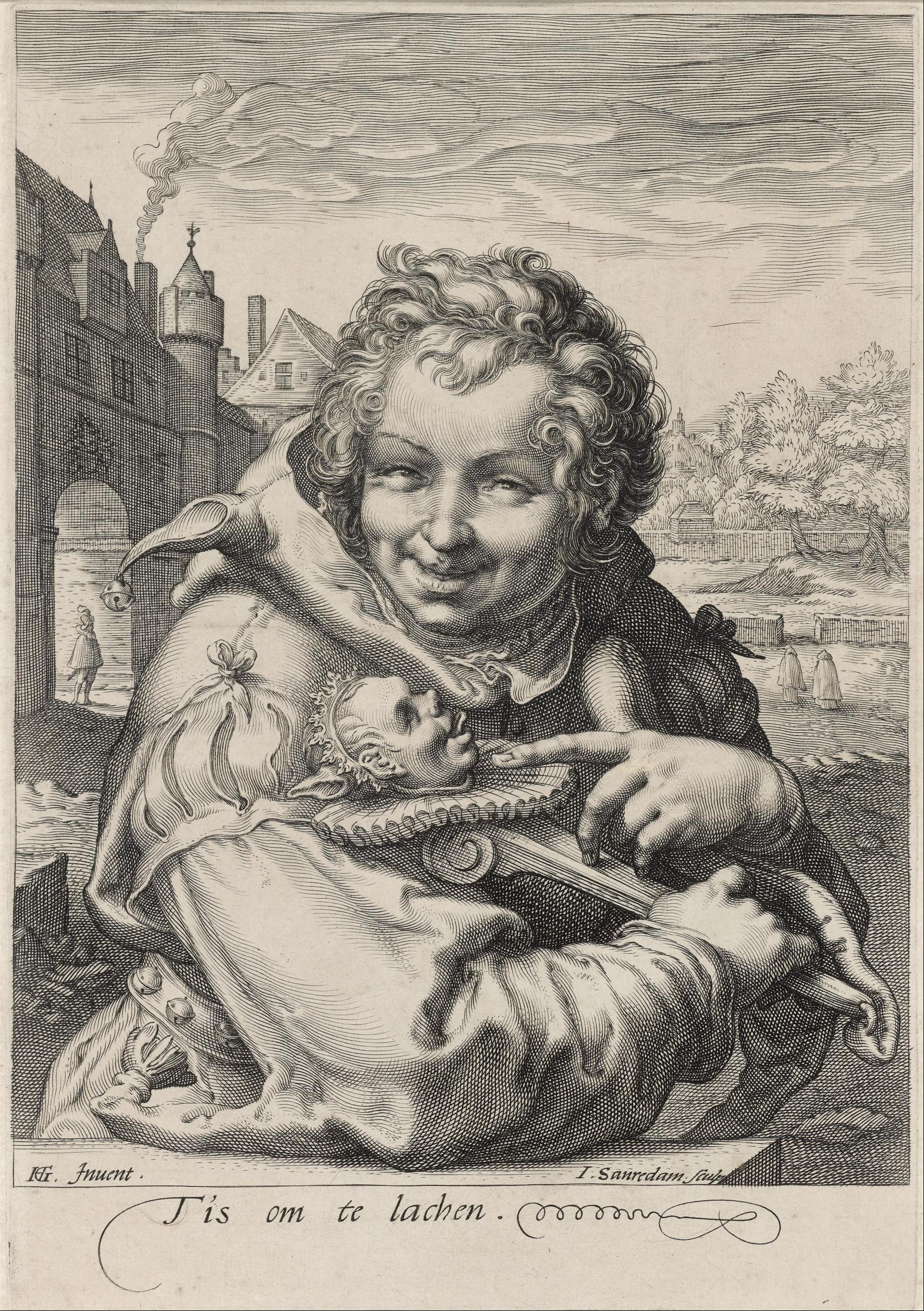
Jan Pietersz. Saenredam - The Fool

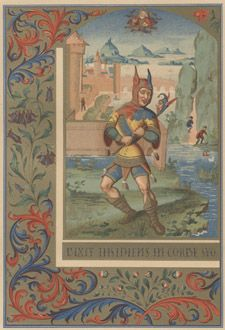
A Court Fool of the 15th Century

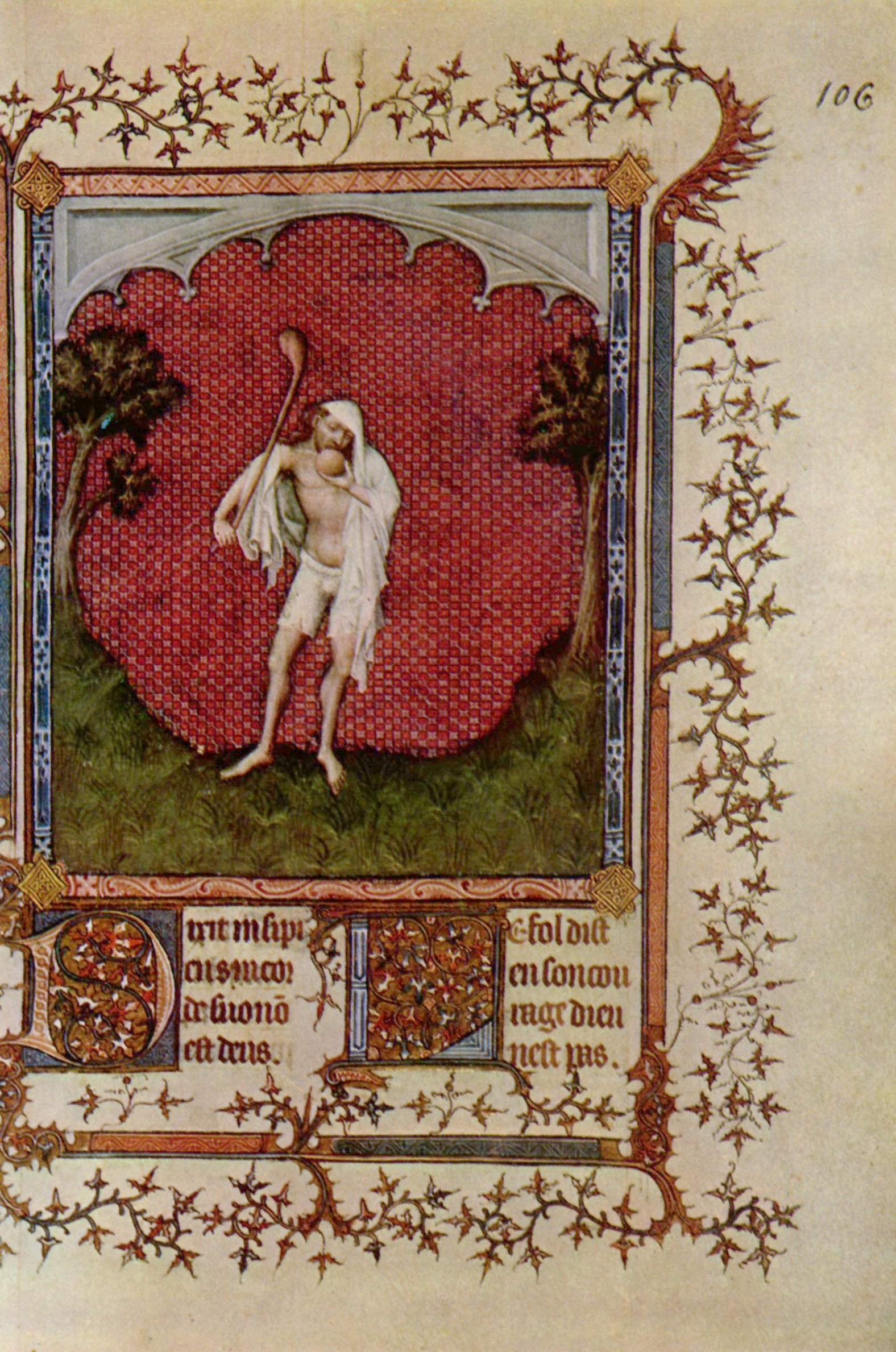
Jacquemart de Hesdin

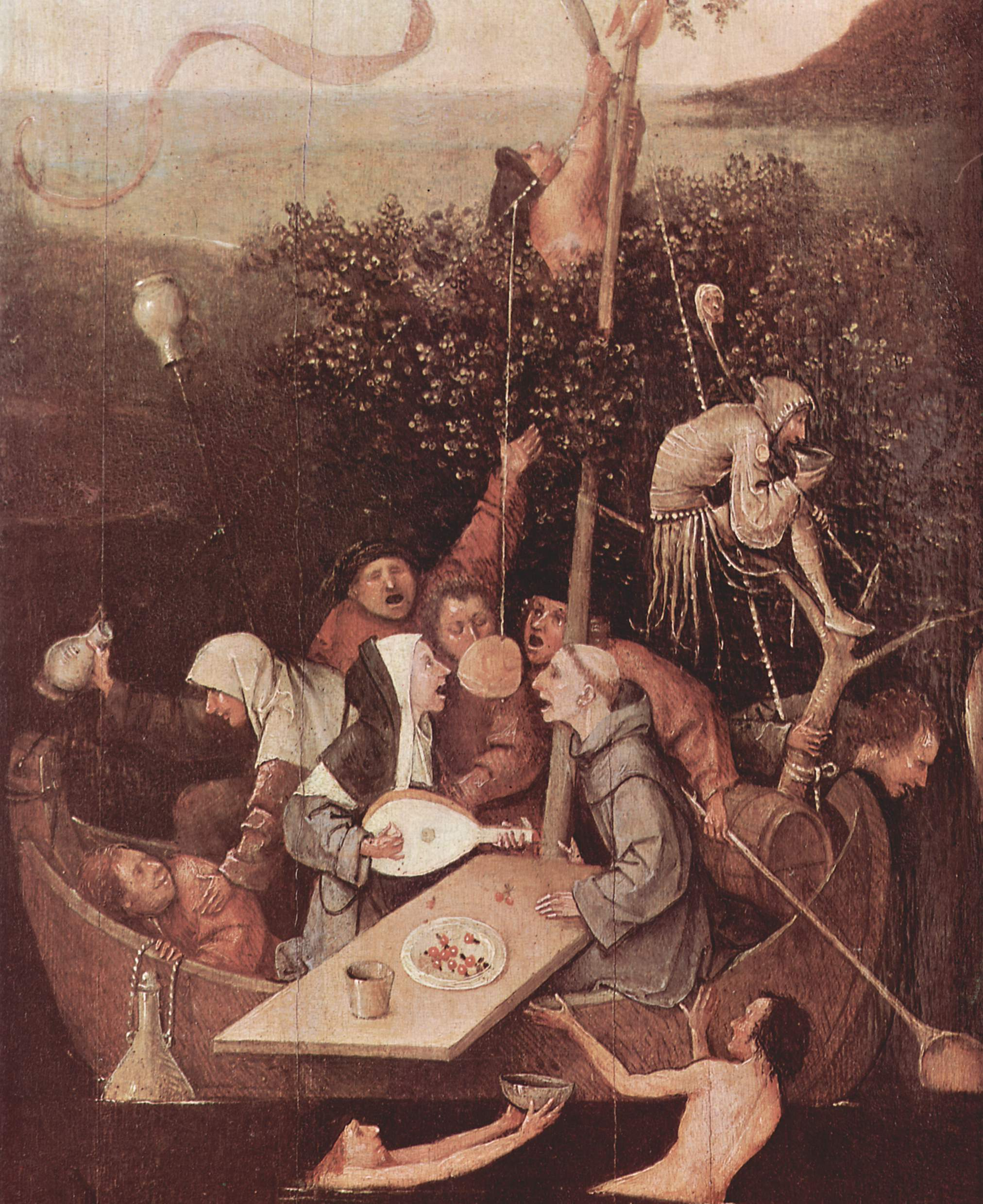
Hieronymus Bosch

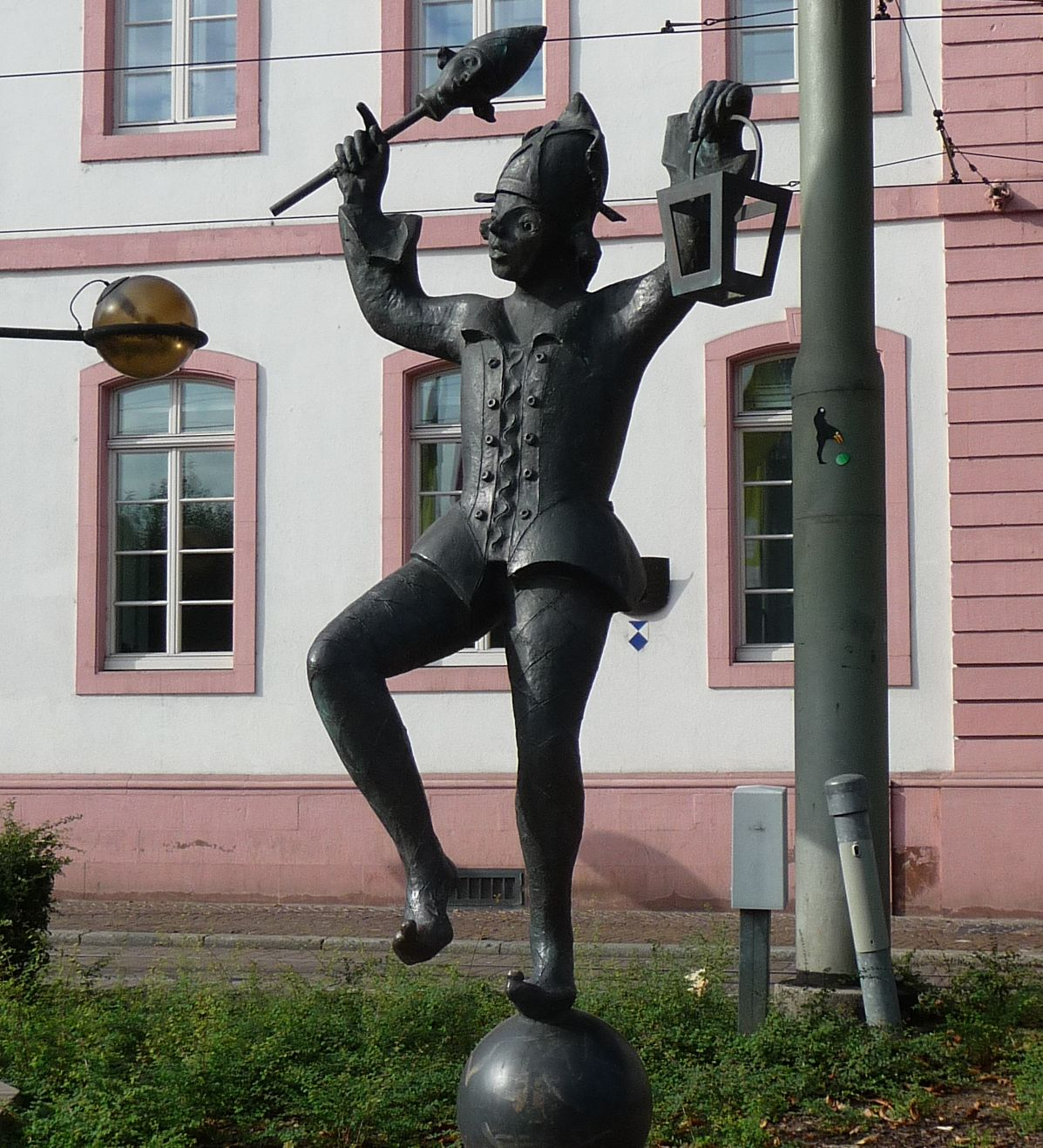
Bajazz mit der Laterne von der Mainzer Künstlerin Inge Blum, eine Symbolfigur des Mainzer Karnevals - panoramio

== See also ==
- Cap and bells
