= Cap and bells =

Type of hat most commonly worn by jesters

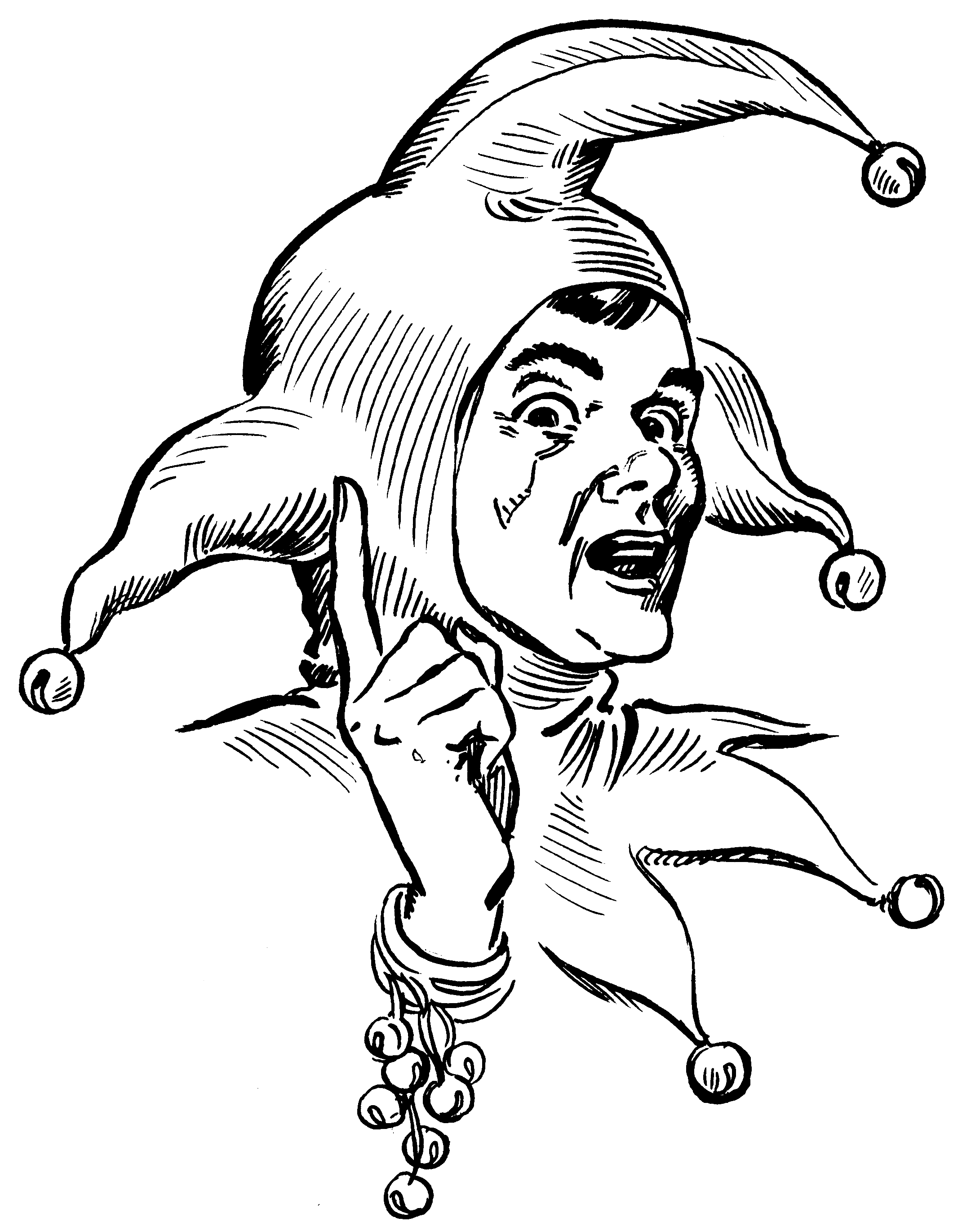
A jester with a cap and bells

The cap and bells is a type of fool's cap with bells worn by a court fool or jester. The bells were also added to the dangling sleeves and announced the appearance of the jester.

== Forms ==
The cap and bells could be in the following forms:

- Ass' ears and an ass' tail, often curling forward
- Horns
- Cockscomb crest
- Royal court jester costume
- Bi-color coxcomb cap
- Fool's cap and masque

Other forms of fool's cap in England were shaped like a monk's cowl with ass's ears, a high-pointed cap covered with bells, or a round cap with an imposing feather.

== Gallery ==
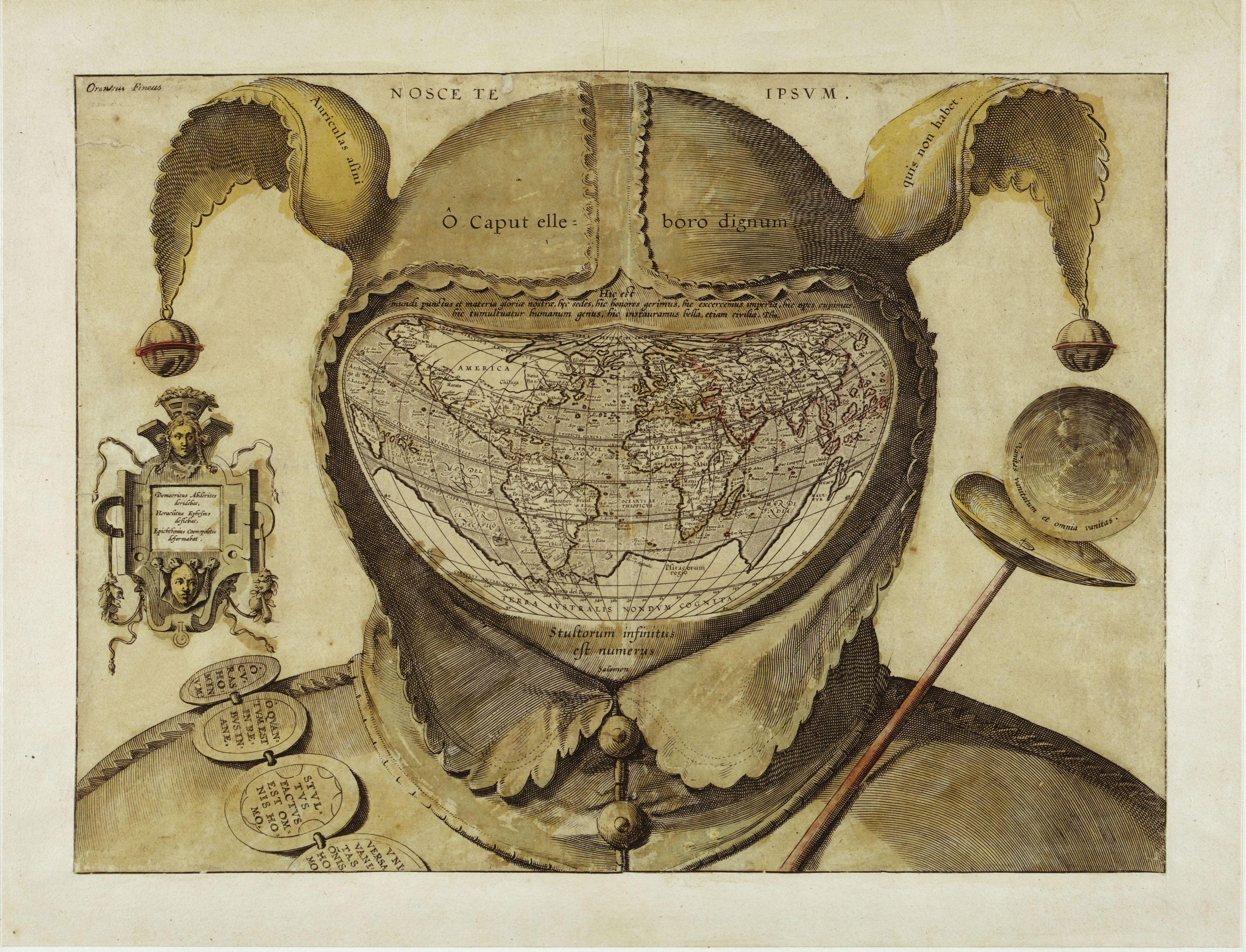
Fool's Cap Map of the World

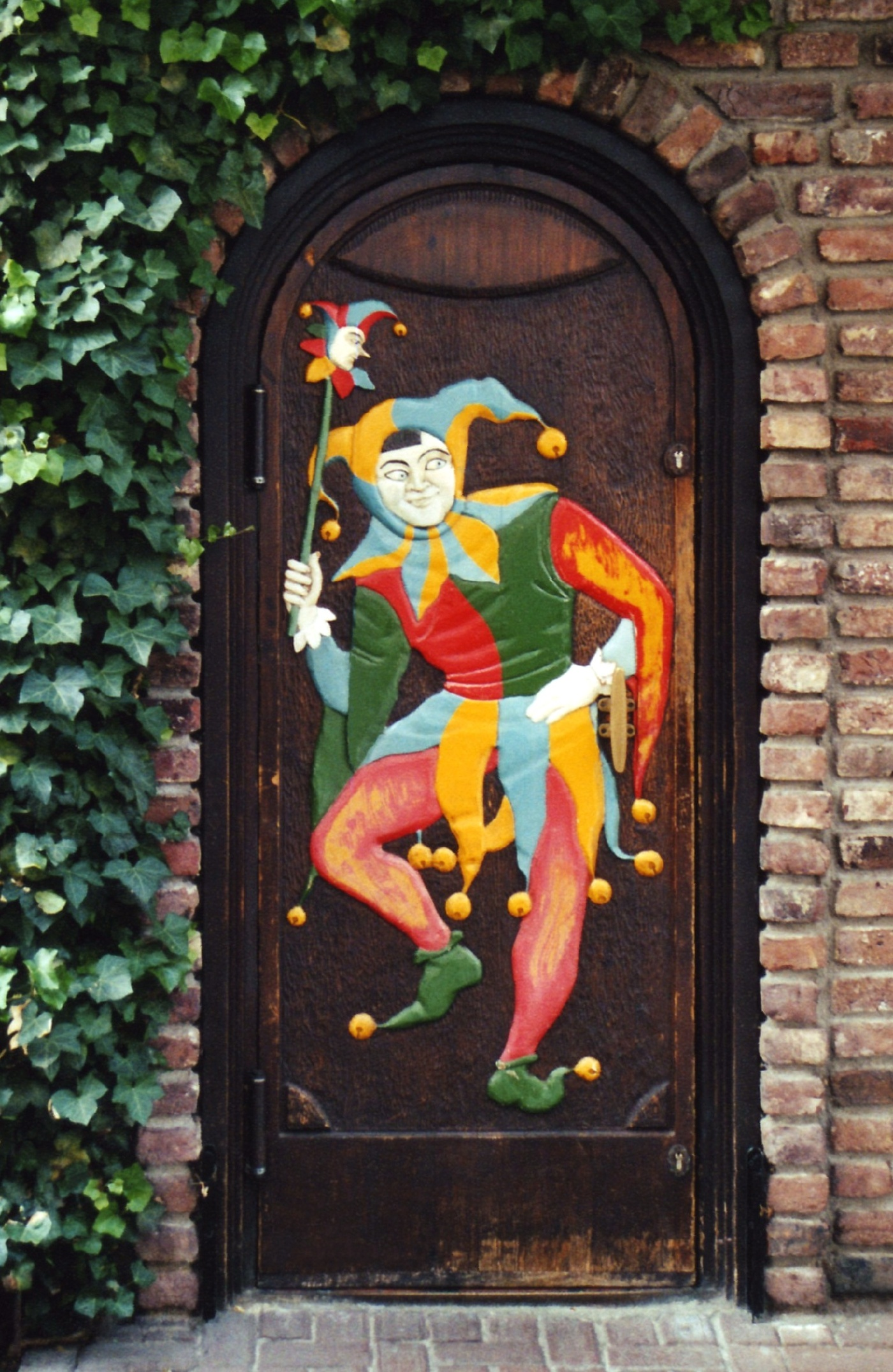
A jester with a cap and bells and a fool's scepter

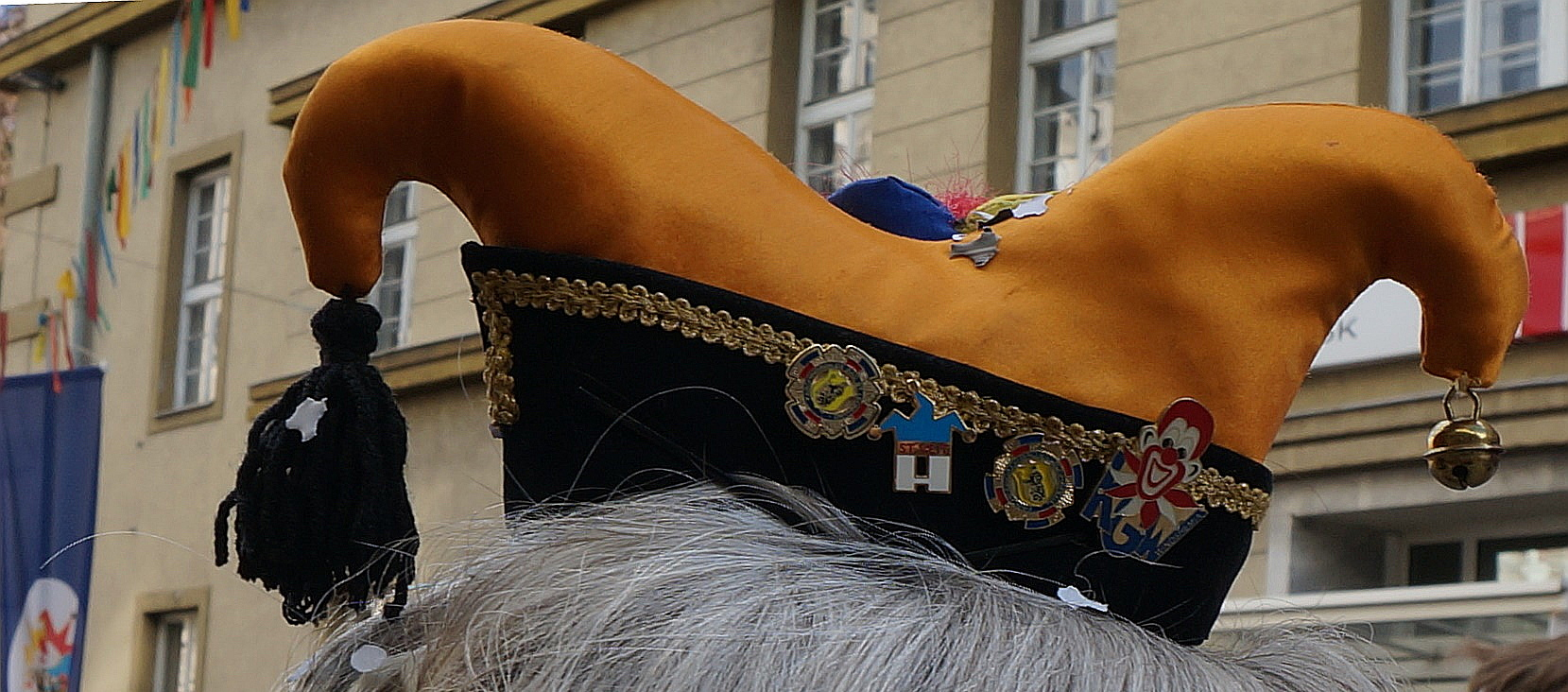
Fool's cap of the Carnival (Fasching) Guild in Villach, Carinthia, Austria

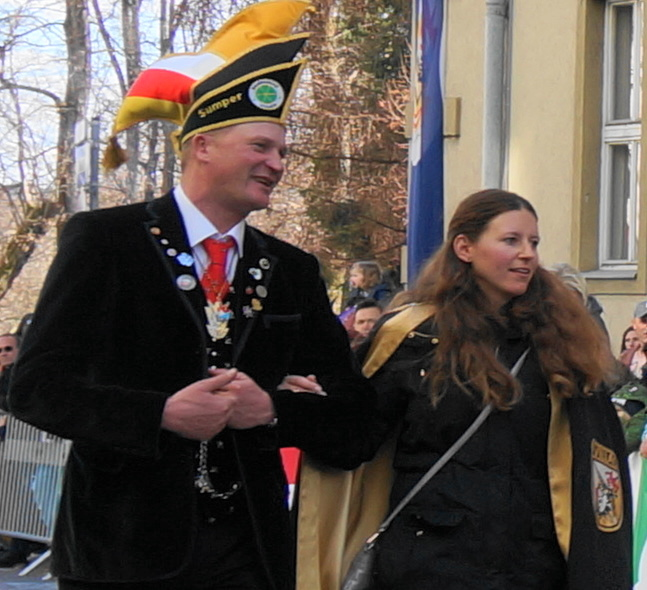
Carnival in Villach

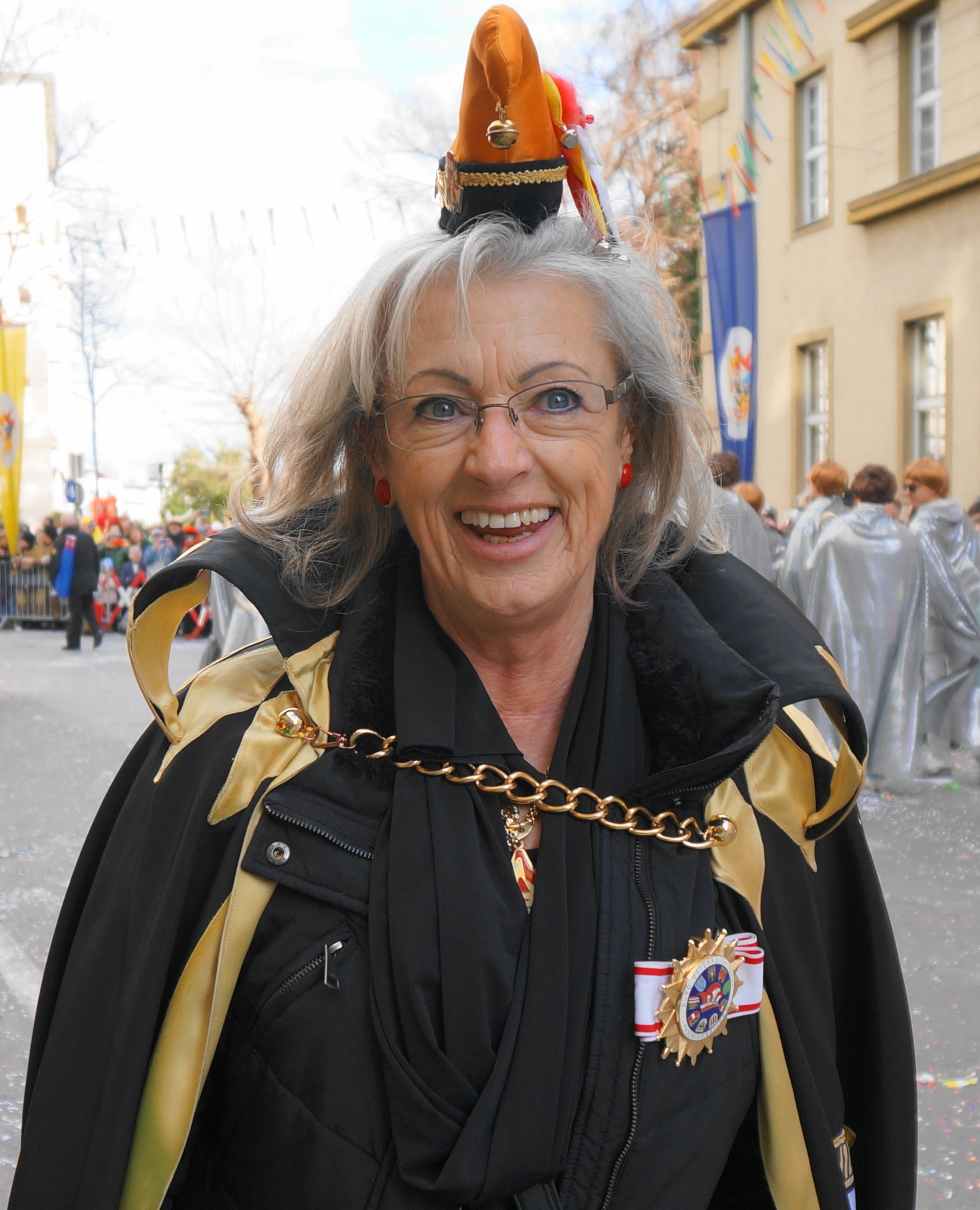
Woman wearing a fool's cap of the Carnival Guild in Villach

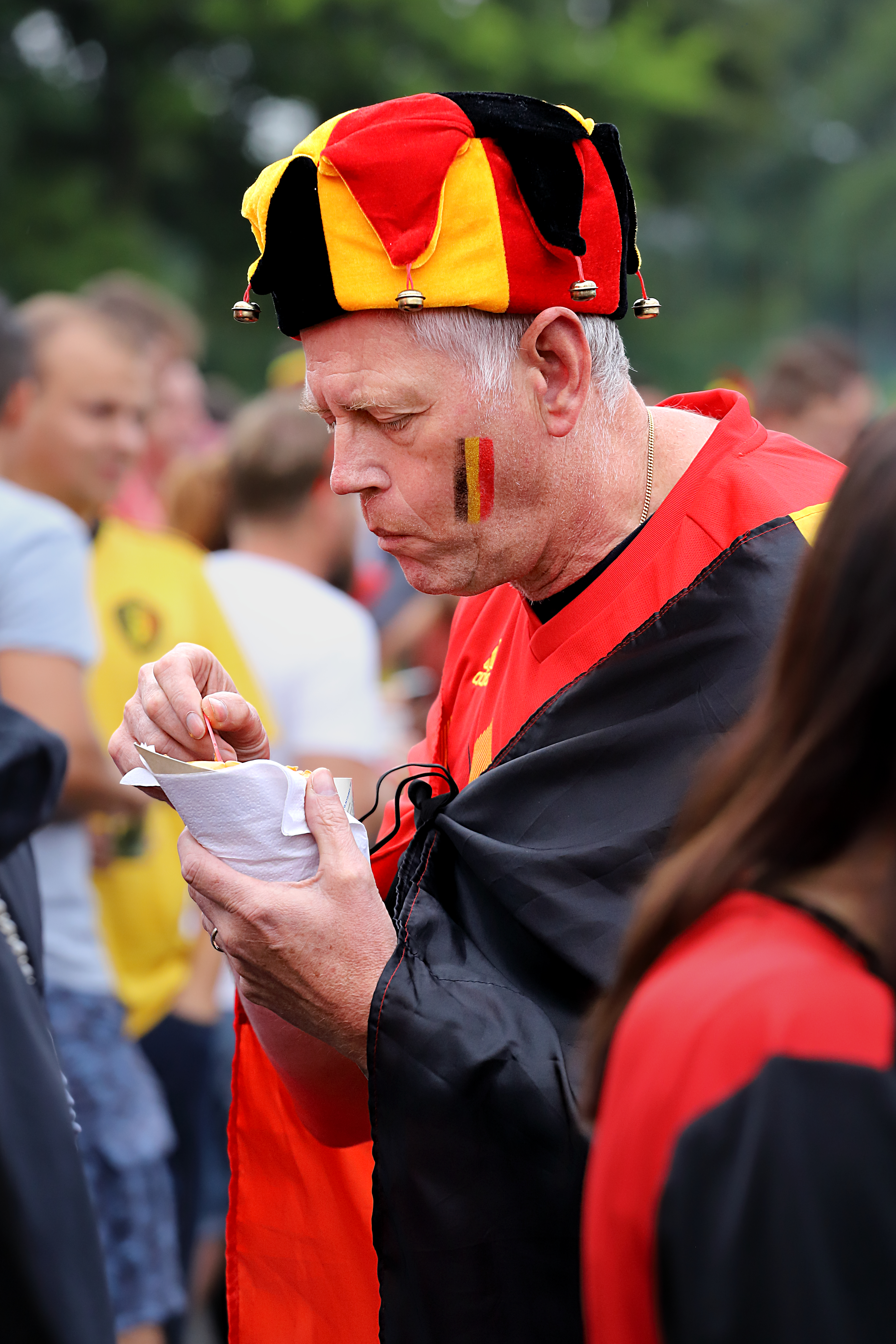
Supporter of the Belgian national football team in Belgium, before their 2018 World Cup semi-final match against France

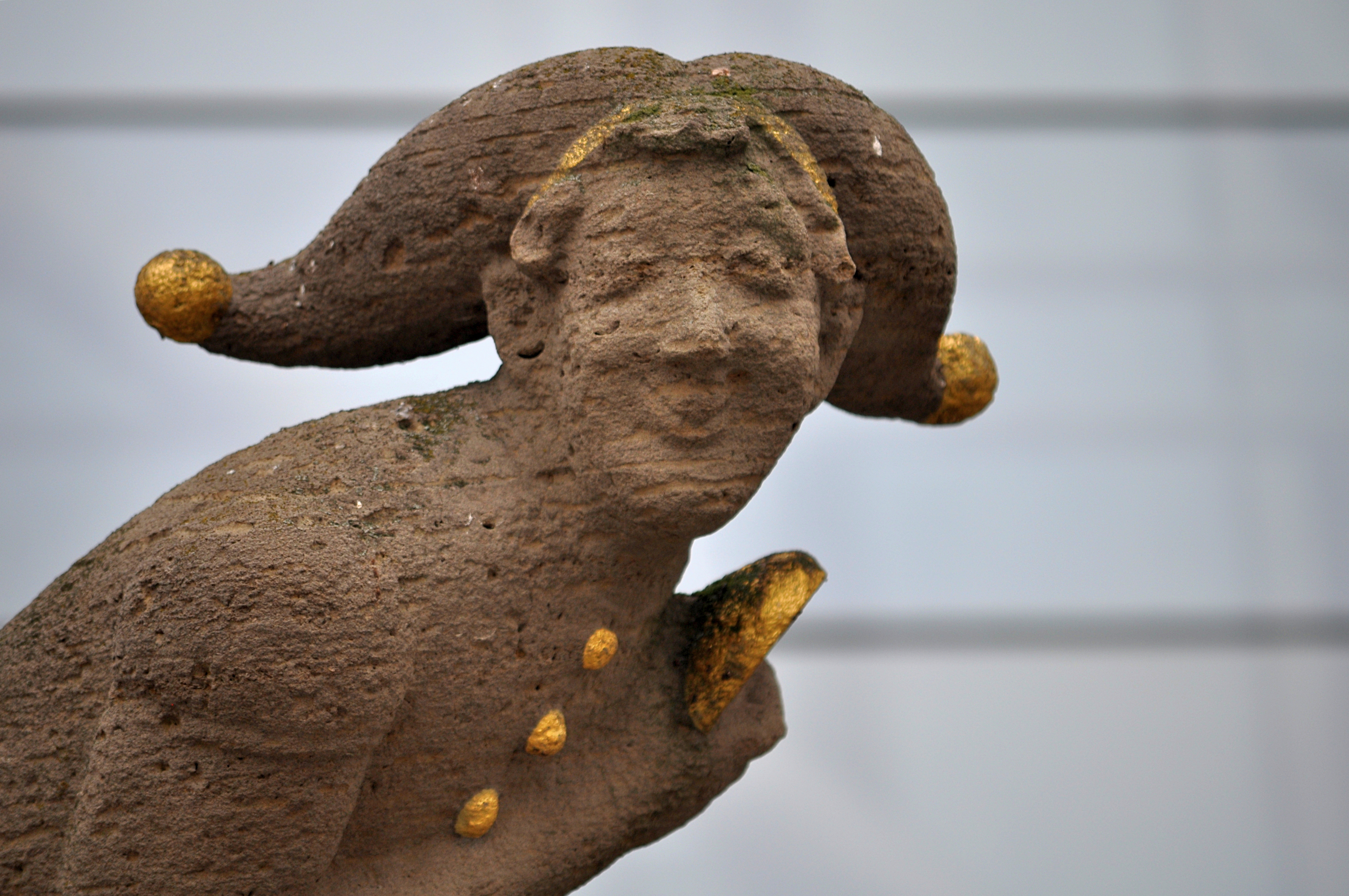
The Eulenspiegelbrunnen, a fountain in Magdeburg, Germany, depicting Till Eulenspiegel
