= List of jesters =

A jester is a person who entertains using varied skills. These may include one or more of skills such as music, storytelling, juggling, acrobatics, joke telling and other similar skills. There have been many examples of jesters in history, fiction, and other mediums.

== In history ==
- Archibald Armstrong (died 1672), jester of James VI and I
- Chicot (c. 1540–1591), jester of Henry III of France
- Henry Patenson (c. 1487-1543), natural household fool to Thomas More and his family
- Jesse Bogdonoff (born April 1, 1955), a former Bank of America financial advisor to the government of Tonga and court jester of Taufa'ahau Tupou IV, the king of Tonga.
- Jamie Fleeman (1713–1778), the Laird of Udny's Fool
- Jane Foole (died after 1558), fool of English Queens Catherine Parr and Mary I
- Jeffrey Hudson (1619–c. 1682), "court dwarf" of Henrietta Maria of France
- Joan d'Acosta (c. 1665– c. 1740), jester of Peter the Great
- João de Sá Panasco (fl. 1524–1567), jester of John III of Portugal
- John Pace (c.1523–c.1590), jester of the Duke of Norfolk and Queen Elizabeth I of England
- Lucretia the Tumbler, jester of Queen Mary I of England
- Madame d'Or, (d. after 1429), was a French court dwarf jester
- Maître Guillaume (employed in 1620 at the same time as Mathurine de Vallois)
- Muckle John, jester of Charles I
- Mathurine de Vallois a.k.a. Mathurine la Folle (Mathurine the Fool), late 1500s to early 1600s, jestress to Henry IV of France and others, helped catch would-be assassin Jean Châtel
- Nichola, jester to Mary, Queen of Scots in the 1560s
- Perkeo of Heidelberg, 18th Century jester of Prince Charles III Philip, Elector Palatine
- Raja Birbal (c. 16th century), Indian jester of Emperor Akbar of Mughal Empire
- Roland the Farter, 12th Century jester of Henry II of England
- Russel Erwood (b. 1981), 2nd official resident jester of Conwy in North Wales replacing the jester of 1295
- Stańczyk (c. 1480–1560), Polish jester
- Tenali Ramakrishna (c. 16th century), Indian jester of Emperor Krishnadevaraya of Vijayanagara Empire
- Tom Durie, jester of Anne of Denmark (d. 1619).
- Thomas Skelton (c. 17th century), jester of Muncaster Castle
- Triboulet (1479–1536), jester of kings Louis XII and Francis I of France
- Tyler Hilton (1886–1942) Prominent Serbian fool, Jester to Petar of Serbia
- William Sommers (died 1560), court fool of Henry VIII of England
- Royal Order of Jesters, a masonic fraternal organization, allowing only Shriners in good standing to join. Admission is by invitation only.
- Gopal Bhar, 18th century jester of Krishnachandra Roy (r. 1710–1783), the king of Nadia Raj in Bengal.

== In writing and theatre ==
- In Shakespeare: see Shakespearian fool
- Pocket, King Lear's fool in Christopher Moore's novel Fool, which retells the story of William Shakespeare's King Lear.
- Wamba, Jester in Sir Walter Scott's Novel Ivanhoe.
- Dagonet, jester to King Arthur in medieval romances
- Jack Point, tragic jester in The Yeomen of the Guard by Gilbert and Sullivan
- Hop-Frog, in the eponymous short story by Edgar Allan Poe.
- Towser, jester to King John the Presbyter in Memory, Sorrow, and Thorn by Tad Williams
- Mr Harley Quin, in the Agatha Christie collection The Mysterious Mr Quin is a modernised version of the "wise fool" who helps others see the truth.
- The anarchic Jerry Cornelius, often shown as a jester figure.
- The Jester, 2003 novel by James Patterson and Andrew Gross.
- The Fool, court jester in Robin Hobb's The Realm of the Elderlings books.
- The Queen's Fool, novel by Philippa Gregory, centers around the life of a young "holy fool" named Hannah, who happens to work with and befriend William Sommers (Will), the former fool/jester of King Henry VIII.
- The Jester is a central character in many of the plays of Dario Fo.
- Rigoletto, Duke of Mantua's jester in Giuseppe Verdi's opera Rigoletto
- "Bear", Jester on Crispin: Cross of Lead
- Till Eulenspiegel, impudent trickster figure originating in Middle Low German folklore.
- Heartless, novel by Marissa Meyer has a character Jest who is a fool/jester and magician in Wonderland, the Rook of Chess.

== In film and television ==
- Clopin, mischievous leader of the Parisian Roma who will defend his people at all costs in the film The Hunchback of Notre Dame. He introduces the audience as a jester to the story, explaining how Quasimodo, the bell ringer from Notre Dame, got to be there. Michael Surrey served as the supervising animator for Clopin.
- The Funny Man, a demonic jester from the British comedy horror film, Funny Man, with a varied and imaginative repertoire of homicidal techniques and an irreverent sense of humour.
- Jester, Court jester of King Cradock in the TV series Jane and the Dragon.
- Jester, the Harlequin puppet in the Puppet Master films
- Kyoami, in Akira Kurosawa's film Ran
- Timothy Claypole, character in the BBC children's television comedy programme Rentaghost of the 1970s/80s, was a jester (played by Michael Staniforth).
- The Photojournalist from Apocalypse Now is often seen as a harlequin figure. In the novel Heart of Darkness, the character of Marlowe meets a Russian wanderer whose clothes have been made from patches of various garments sewn together, giving him the appearance of a harlequin. The Russian has developed a fanatic admiration for Kurtz. In the film actor Dennis Hopper portrays this fanaticism as being mixed with the 1960s counter-culture spirit of the Vietnam era.
- In the children's adventure game show Knightmare, there were two jesters, Folly and Motley.

== In comic books and animation ==
- In the Marvel Comics comic Daredevil, The Jester is the alter-ego of villain Jonathan Powers, who appears between issues #47 and 49.
- The Jester is a superhero in the DC Comics universe.
- Quackerjack, a vicious jester with a weird obsession for toys in Disney's animated series Darkwing Duck.
- Merryman, leader of the Inferior Five in DC Comics, wears a jester costume.
- Maytag, in the webcomic Flipside is a jester. She is normally very timid, but takes on the normal jester stereotype when she wears her cap 'n bells.
- Allen Walker, in the manga and anime D.Gray-man, is given the title Crown Clown, also known as God's Clown, and carries a jester's mask.
- DC Comics villain Harley Quinn derives her name and look from a harlequin jester. To a lesser extent, her boss, the Joker was based on a Jester from a Joker playing card.
- Squidly, a squid jester from SpongeBob SquarePants, is found in the episode "Dunces and Dragons".
- Spinel, a Gem from Steven Universe: The Movie and Steven Universe Future. She was abandoned by Pink Diamond and left in the garden they used to play in for 6,000 years, causing her to break down and become insane when she learned of Pink Diamond's fate. Her bouncy animations are heavily inspired by rubber hose animation.
- Fizzarolli, a club jester from Helluva Boss. He works for Asmodeus, owner of the popular club Ozzie's, in the Lust Ring of Hell.
- Rascal/Joker, from Smile PreCure!. He is a sadistic character who loves to have fun and watch others fear. His only goal is to help Emperor Nogo to destroy Jubaland.
- Pomni, the protagonist of The Amazing Digital Circus. She is the avatar assumed by a human who puts on a virtual headset and becomes trapped in the Digital Circus like many of the other characters, desperate to search for an exit to escape the game.
- Mr. Jester/Oscar, the king of the country <Spamtopia> from the show Smiling Friends. He is insecure of how his eye looks, so he made it illegal to make direct eye contact in the country of <Spamtopia>.

== In video games ==
- Chester- a candy-themed jester from Brawl Stars. He is a Legendary Brawler and has 5 different abilities.
- Chuckles – jester in the Ultima series of role playing games who provides comic entertainment and plot hints.
- Cicero – keeper from the Dark Brotherhood in The Elder Scrolls V: Skyrim, who wears a jester's outfit and took on the persona of a jester after killing one.
- Cleon – a star fairy jester in Bust-a-Move 4.
- Clownpiece - a fairy jester who lives on the moon and serves as one of the many bosses in Touhou Project. She first appeared in Legacy of Lunatic Kingdom. Her clothing is similar to the American flag, and she carries a torch that drives anyone mad upon looking at the flame within it.
- Sarmenti - one of the playable characters in Darkest Dungeon.
- Daycare Attendant - an animatronic jester found in the Superstar Daycare in Freddy Fazbear's Mega Pizzaplex in Five Nights at Freddy's: Security Breach. He has two different personalities depending on whether the lights are on or off - Sun, who's cheerful and energetic, and Moon, who's sadistic and demented. Surprisingly, both personalities carry on the Daycare Attendant's propensity for cleaning and following the rules.
- Dhoulmagus – evil jester in the Dragon Quest VIII game by Square Enix.
- Dimentio – evil megalomaniac magician in Super Paper Mario who wears a stylized jester costume and creates clever similes. He is one of the main villains of the game and attempts to make Mario and Luigi his slaves. He also wears an Italian Comedy Mask.
- Fargus – in the platform game Pandemonium.
- Fark- a robot Jester and rival to Spark meant to replace him in the first Spark game, who helps Spark defeat the clarity AI in Spark 3. Fark is playable in all three Spark games.
- Feste – jester for the Duke's court in Dragon's Dogma.
- Fiddle - a jester character who assists the player in Juilliard Music Adventure.
- Harle – character in Chrono Cross who jests at expense of reality itself.
- Hecklar – insane and sadistic court jester in Kronos Digital's fighting game Cardinal Syn.
- Hyehehe - a hyena jester in My Singing Monsters and My Singing Monsters: Dawn Of Fire, it can be found on Earth Island, Mythical Island, Wanderer Island, and The Continent. It plays an electronic organ using its ears and occasionally cackles to the song.
- Jester – an alter-ego of Arkham, in Devil May Cry 3.
- Jester – a major antagonist in Terry Cavanagh's Dicey Dungeons, who is later unlocked as a playable character.
- Jester – A.K.A. Sarah Hawkins in the game UT3, fitting her name by making jests about the opponent or teammates.
- Jester Zombie - a zombie jester from Plants vs. Zombies 2 that uses its powers to deflect projectiles.
- Jevil - A secret boss of the first chapter of the video game Deltarune. He was once the court jester of Card Castle, until he began to see the world as a game. He was subsequently locked in a prison cell under the castle by his friend, Seam, as ordered by the king.
- Jimbo – The only character in Balatro who speaks. He is one of many jokers and jesters featured in the game.
- Joka - Joka, also known as "Joker", is a recurring character in the game series Klonoa.
- Jollo – court jester of the Land of the Green Isles in King's Quest VI, and an essential ally to Alexander. He warns Alexander about Alhazred's genie and keeps him informed of the Vizer's scheming. In the long path of the game, he also is able to swap out the genie's lamp and get Alexander out of the dungeon once.
- Kefka Palazzo – in Final Fantasy VI, wears the typical outfit and makeup of a jester.
- Laughlyn – powerful spirit in Shadowrun RPG. He is a trickster spirit of technology in decay. Jake must bend Laughlyn to his will in order to defeat the dragon, Drake.
- Malcolm – mad jester of The Legend of Kyrandia adventure games
- Marx – jester from Kirby Super Star and Kirby Super Star Ultra used as a twist villain in Milky Way Wishes. Appears in other Kirby and Nintendo games.
- Shaco – evil jester of demonic origin who is a playable trap champion in the game League of Legends.
- Shadow Milk Cookie – A blue jester-themed villain and playable character from the game Cookie Run Kingdom. He is a major antagonist, and is the foil to Pure Vanilla Cookie.
- Spark- The main playable character of Spark the Electric Jester and its two sequels.
- Trivet – royal jester in the adventure game Blazing Dragons.
- Twinkle – a little jester girl in Bust a Move 3.
- The Black Jester – Writer of Video Game, Slave Master: The Game (Steam), aka Gölök Buday
- The Prototype– The main antagonist in the game Poppy Playtime. It has a spider like body containing parts from the previous chapters villains, it has a jester hat on its head.
- Umlaut – petrified Jester Skull in CarnEvil who gives a brief rhyme to describe what's in store upon selecting a level. He is also a sub-boss at the final level of the game.
- Vex - primary antagonist in Sackboy: A Big Adventure. He is a jester like creature made of cloth and born from chaos and fear, who wishes to plunge Craftworld into terror and despair through a nightmarish force called the Uproar.
- Zorn & Thorn – pair of court jesters in the RPG Final Fantasy IX.
- A nameless jester helps and hinders the player in the Infocom game Zork Zero.
- Nights into Dreams... – featured two brightly colored jesters. Nights, who wore a purple jester outfit with a purple hat, each with carnival and dream like designs on them, and Reala, Nights' nemesis, who had a clownlike face, and wore red and sky blue, and red and black striped shoes with a red- and black-striped jester hat.
- There is also a Jester in the tower in the 2007 Xbox 360 game Overlord. The player can kick the jester, knocking him a great distance, making cow bell sounds when he hits the floor. The Jester also follows the player around the tower, and in the tutorial he taunts the player. The player must repeatedly hurt the jester to finish the tutorial.
- In the two Persona 2 video games, Joker wears clothing reminiscent of that of a jester.
- Tony Hawk's Underground 2 features "The Jester" as a playable character after the level in New Orleans.
- Jester is a character class in the MMORPG Flyff and in the RPGs Gauntlet: Dark Legacy and Darkest Dungeon.
- Dragon Quest III contains a Jester character class. In the American version of the game, the character class is renamed to Goof-off.

== Standup Comedy ==
- The Black Jester – aka Gölök Buday
- Paul Desmond Town- aka Paulo des Rapisto

== See also ==
- Buffoon
- Clown
- List of clowns
- Shakespearean fool
- Wise fool
