= Pace (surname) =

Family name

Pace is a surname in both Italian and English. In addition to being found in Italy and England, it is also found in Germany, is common in Malta, and can be found among Italian and British immigrants in the United States and other countries. Families called Pace have been prominent in Malta and in Sicily and held feudal estates in both of these areas.

The pronunciation varies according to a family's origins and linguistic heritage, but the most commonly used are the English /peɪs/, the Italian /patʃe/, and the Maltese /patʃ/.

== Origin ==
There are at least two independent origins of the name Pace, one in Italy and the other in England, but in both cases it is believed to be of Latin origins. Most people called Pace in Malta have an origin in speakers of Italian, while most Paces in Germany are probably connected with someone of the name who originated in England.

In England the spelling of the name has many variant spellings, including Peace, Paice, Pase, Payce, and others. The surname dates back to the early 13th century and early examples of the recordings include Roger Pays in the 1275 Hundred Rolls of Norfolk, William Pace in 1242 in the Book of Fees for Devon, and Peter Pece of Yorkshire in 1302. Examples from parish registers include the marriage of Alice Pace to Thomas Picket in 1539 at St. Michael Bassishaw, and Alyse Paice who married John Garrot on August 16, 1573, at the church of St. Lawrence Pountney, both in the City of London. As a name in England, Pace has at least two possible origins. The first is from an early medieval nickname for a mild-mannered and even-tempered man, derived from the Anglo-Norman-French and Middle English word "pace" or "pece", ultimately from the Latin "pax" or "pacis", meaning "peace". The second possible origin is from the result of confusion with the personal name "Pash" or "Pask(e)", used frequently in medieval England as both a Christian name and as a nickname for a person born at Easter, or one having some other connection with that festival, such as a feudal obligation to provide a service, or make a payment, on that date.

It has also been argued that Pace is an unusual surname of French origins, and the first recorded spelling of the family name is shown to be that of John Pais, which was dated 1219, in the "Register of the Freemen of Leicester", during the reign of King Henry III, known as "The Frenchman", 1216–1272. Surnames became necessary when governments introduced personal taxation. In England this was known as Poll Tax. Throughout the centuries, surnames in every country have continued to change creating variants of the original spelling.

=== Italy ===
The Italian surnames shares the same Latin root, the word for peace, pax. Specifically, "pace" is the ablative declension of "pax" in Latin, which in Classical Latin was probably pronounced "PAH-kay". The word sees popular usage in Ecclesiastical Latin, which today as in the Middle Ages pronounces it in the Italian manner. "Pace" remains the word for "peace" in Modern Italian.

The Italian Pace is believed to be a patronymic, meaning that those with the surname are the descendants of a man with a first name of Pace (from Latin Pax, Pacis). Early bearers of this surname might have been bestowed with it because of their calm or reputation as peacemakers, or to those who spread peace in a religious sense. The first references to the surname Pace occur in the 6th and 7th centuries in the forms of Pace, Pacius, Pacinus, and Pax.

An Italian line of Pace was ennobled in the Holy Roman Empire as Pace von Friedensberg in the seventeenth century.

Today the surname Pace is concentrated in various regions of Italy and is found all over Italy, especially in northern Piemonte and Lombardy, in central Latium and Abruzzo, and in southern Sicily, Calabria, Apulia, and Basilicata. In certain places like Pratola Peligna in L'Aquila, Abruzzo, virtually everyone has a relative with the surname Pace and it can take up pages in the phonebook.

The Maltese line of the name comes thanks to the strong Italian influence on that nation. Especially important was the period after October 5, 1350, when Malta was incorporated directly under the Kingdom of Sicily, expanding the number of greatly in Malta. In Malta, the surname is sometimes pronounced as in Italian but other times an abridged form, "PAH-ch", is used.

=== England ===
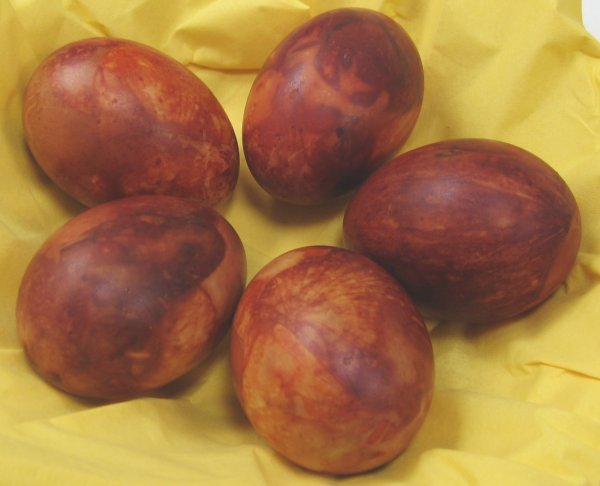
Pace eggs

The Dictionary of English Surnames gives the origin of the English surname "Pace" as ME pais, OFr pais, Lat pax, "peace, concord, amity", and adds: "As ME pasches appears also as paisch, piece, peace, and Easter eggs are still called Pace eggs." The area of greatest concentration is Wolverhampton.

The surname "Pacey", may derive from the French village of Pacy sur Eure (again probably from Latin Pax, pacis). It is profiled separately from the surname "Pace", and is ranked 3578 for frequency. Newbold Pacey, a village in Warwickshire, existed as Newbold at the time of the Domesday Book and according to the Victoria County History later "took its name from "the family of Pascy, or Pacey".

The two surnames have historically been sometimes confused. The surname of Richard Pace, the 16th-century churchman, is today pronounced as "Pace", but his biographer Jervis Wegg states that his surname at the time was spoken as two syllables.

== Notable people ==
=== Brazil ===
- José Carlos Pace (1944–1977), Brazilian Formula One racing driver

=== Canada ===
- Kate Pace (born 1969), Canadian Olympic and World Champion alpine skier

=== Italy ===
- Camillo Pace (1862–1948), Italian Protestant pastor and evangelist who supported the German Protestant anti-Nazi movement in the 1930s
- Giulio Pace (1550–1635), Italian Aristotelian scholar and jurist
- Flavio Pace (born 1977), Italian Roman Catholic prelate
- Joseph Pace (artist) (born 1959), Italian painter and sculptor
- Tommaso Pace, Italian diplomat and writer, born in San Costantino Albanese and active in the 19th century
- The Pace family of Udine were ennobled in 1658, receiving the title of count

=== Malta ===
- Carmelo Pace (1906–1993), Maltese composer and professor of music theory and harmony
- Claudette Pace (born 1968), Maltese member of parliament and singer
- Jamie Pace (born 1977), English-born Maltese international footballer
- Laurie Pace (born 1966), Maltese judo player who represented her country at the 1992, 1996 and 2000 Summer Olympics
- Louis Pace (1948–2025), Maltese footballer
- Michela Pace (born 2001), Maltese singer who represented Malta in the Eurovision Song Contest 2019
- Saverius Pace (17th century), minor Maltese philosopher who specialised in physics

=== South Africa ===
- Carle Pace (1918–2008), South African cyclist, track sprinter and endurance athlete

=== United Kingdom ===
- Derek Pace (1932–1989), English professional footballer
- George Pace (1915–1975), English architect who specialised in ecclesiastical works
- Ian Pace (born 1968), English classical pianist
- John Pace (c. 1523 – c. 1590), English jester to Henry VIII, to the Duke of Norfolk, and at the court of Elizabeth I
- Norman Pace (born 1953), English actor and comedian, best known as one half of the comedy duo Hale and Pace
- Richard Pace (disambiguation), multiple people

=== United States ===
- Andrew K. Pace (born 1969), Librarian and author
- Anne Marie Pace (born 1965), American author
- Calvin Pace (born 1980), American football player
- Charles Henry Pace (1886–1963), American composer and publisher (both as sheet music and as recordings) of Christian songs
- Darrell Pace (born 1956), American archer who won individual titles at the World Championships and at the Summer Olympics
- Dinah Watts Pace (1853–1933), African-American educator
- Frank Pace, Jr. (1912–1988), American businessman and Secretary of the Army
- Harry Pace (Harry Herbert Pace, 1884–1943), African-American music publisher and insurance executive, and founder of Black Swan Records
- Homer Pace (1879–1942), American business educator
- Ivan Pace Jr. (born 2000), American football player
- Jim Pace (American football) (1936–1983), American player of American football
- Jim Pace (racing driver) (1961–2020), American racing driver
- LaShun Pace (1961–2022), American gospel singer and songwriter
- Lee Pace (born 1979), American actor
- Lula Pace (1868–1925), American botanist
- Lyndon Fitzgerald Pace (born 1964), American serial killer
- Norman R. Pace (born 1942), American biochemist
- Orlando Pace (born 1975), American football player
- Peter Pace (born 1945), U.S. Marine Corps general who served as Chairman of the Joint Chiefs of Staff
- Teresa Pace, America engineer
- Wayne Pace (born 1946 or 1947), former chief financial officer and executive vice president of Time Warner Inc.

=== In fiction ===
- Charlie Pace, a primary character in the ABC TV series Lost
- James Tayper Pace, a character in The Bell (novel) of 1958 by Iris Murdoch
