= Toison d'or King of Arms =

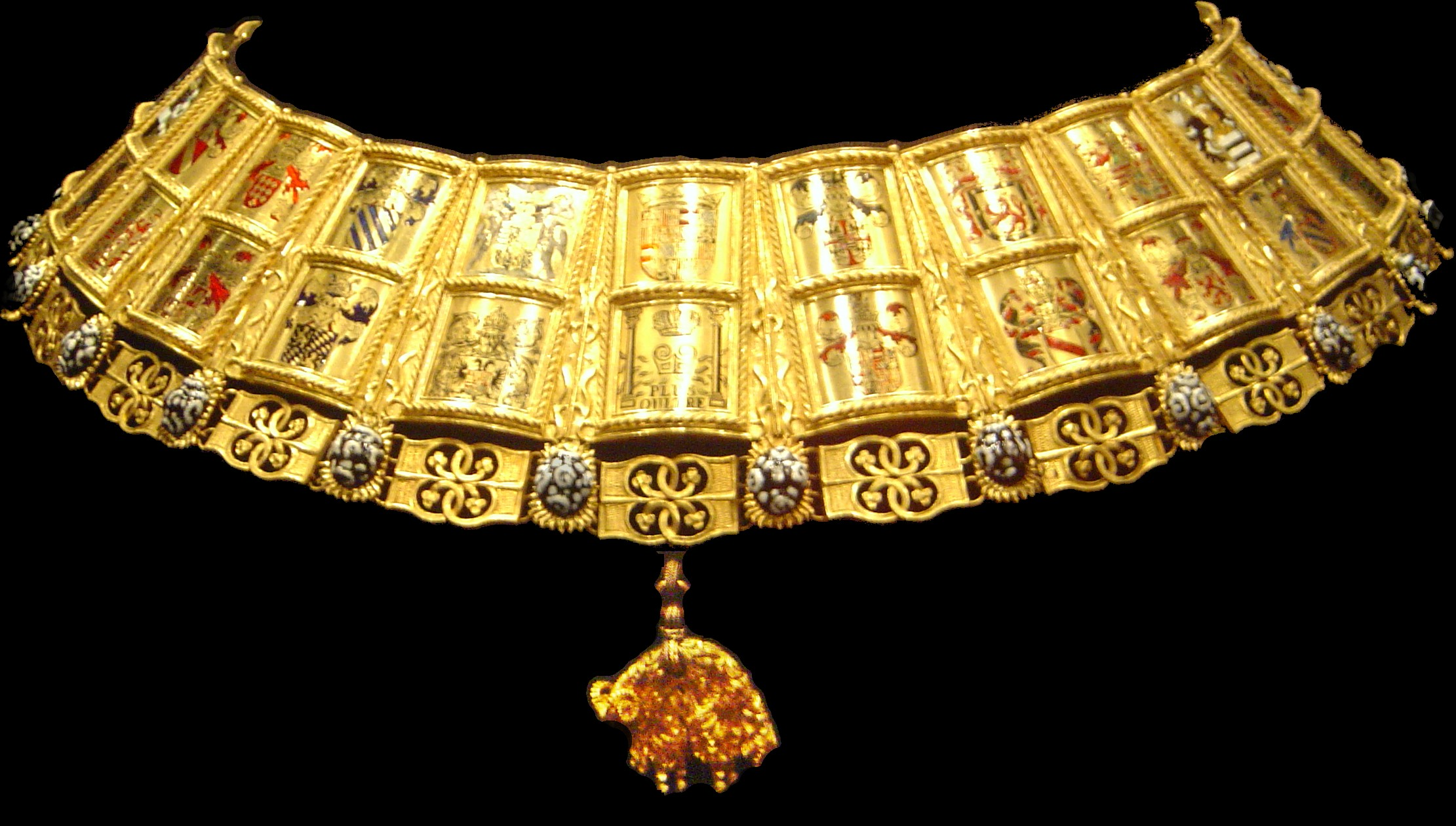
Potence or Neck Collar worn by the King of Arms to the Order of the Golden Fleece.

The office called Toison d'or was that of the King of Arms of the Order of the Golden Fleece. Founded in 1431, it was one of the four offices of the Order. The Toison d'or King of Arms was also the primary King of Arms for the Duchy of Burgundy and the Southern Netherlands, and held precedence over all other officers of arms of those lands.

== History ==
The order's first King of Arms was Jean Le Fèvre de Saint-Remy. He was appointed following the foundation of the Order in 1430 by Philip the Good, Duke of Burgundy, at the Order's chapter meeting in Lille in November 1431.

== Name ==
The name of the office was inspired by the Garter King of Arms, as they are both named after the order they are officers of arms to.

== Holders of the office ==
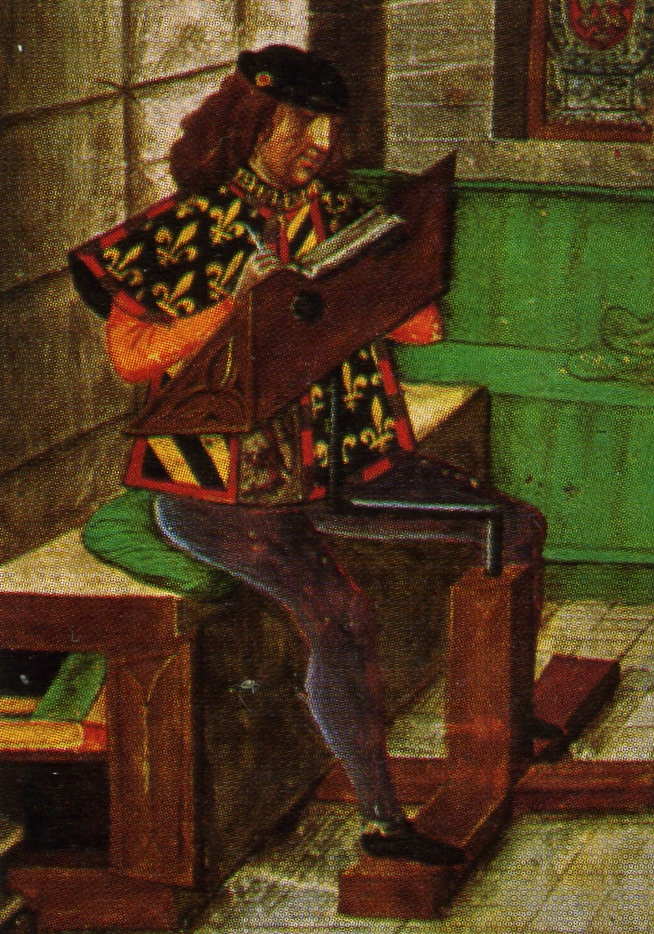
Jean Le Fèvre de Saint-Remy, the first holder of the office

== Fusil pursuivant ==
In 1431, Philip the Good named a pursuivant to the Toison d'or King of Arms called Fusil. The first Fusil pursuivant was Georges Poucques, who left the order after being nominated King of Arms to Flanders.

== See also ==
- Garter King of Arms
