= Order of the Golden Fleece =

Catholic order of chivalry

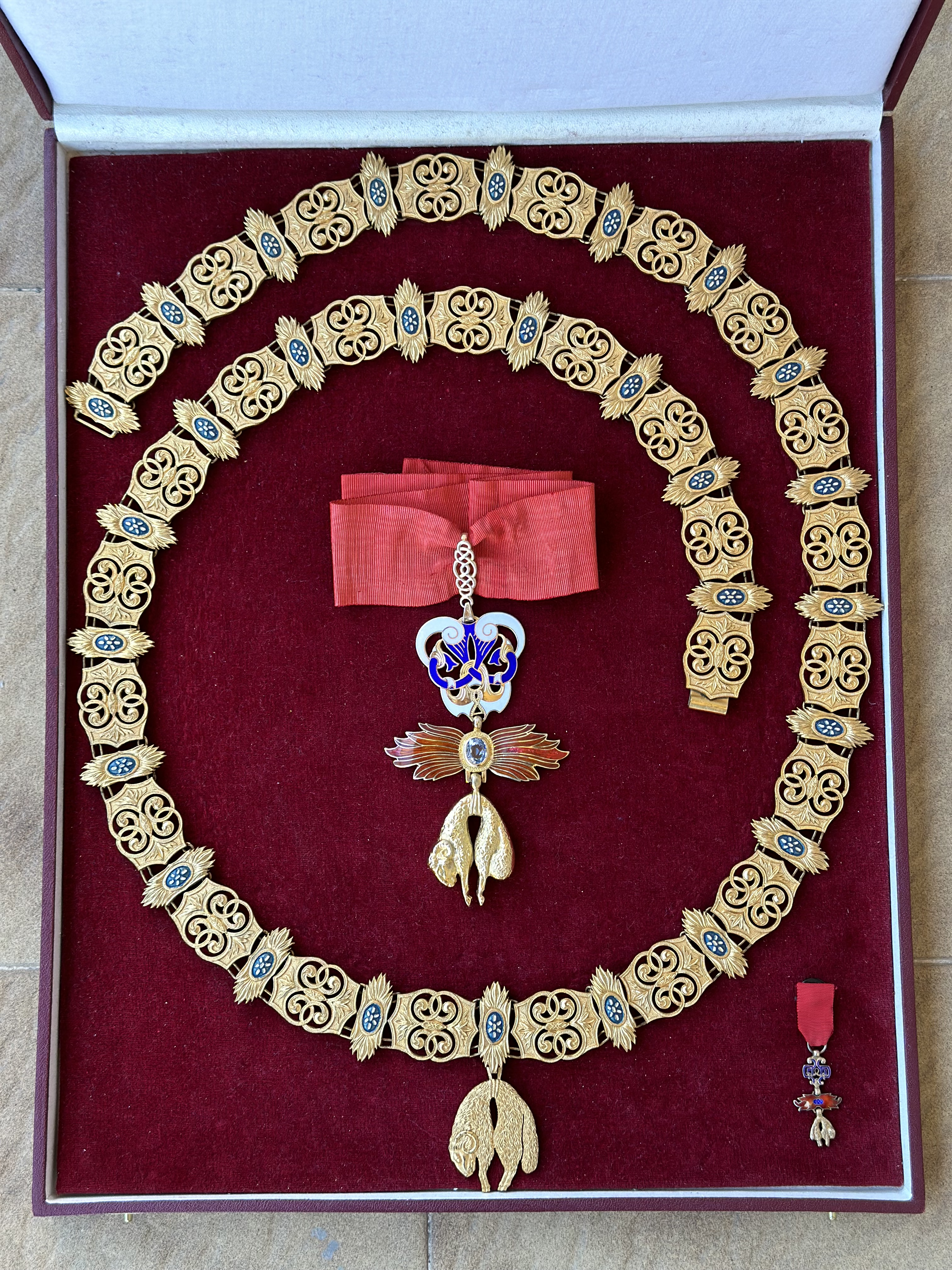
- Collar and badges of a knight of the Spanish order

Awarded by the King of Spain and the Head of the House of Habsburg-Lorraine
- Established: 10 January 1430; 596 years ago
- Motto: Pretium Laborum Non Vile; Non Aliud
- Status: Extant
- Founder: Philip III, Duke of Burgundy
- Grand Masters: Felipe VI of Spain; Archduke Karl of Austria
- Grades: Knight

Precedence
- Next (higher): None
- Next (lower): Order of Charles III; Order of St George; Military Order of Maria Theresa
- Ribbon of the order

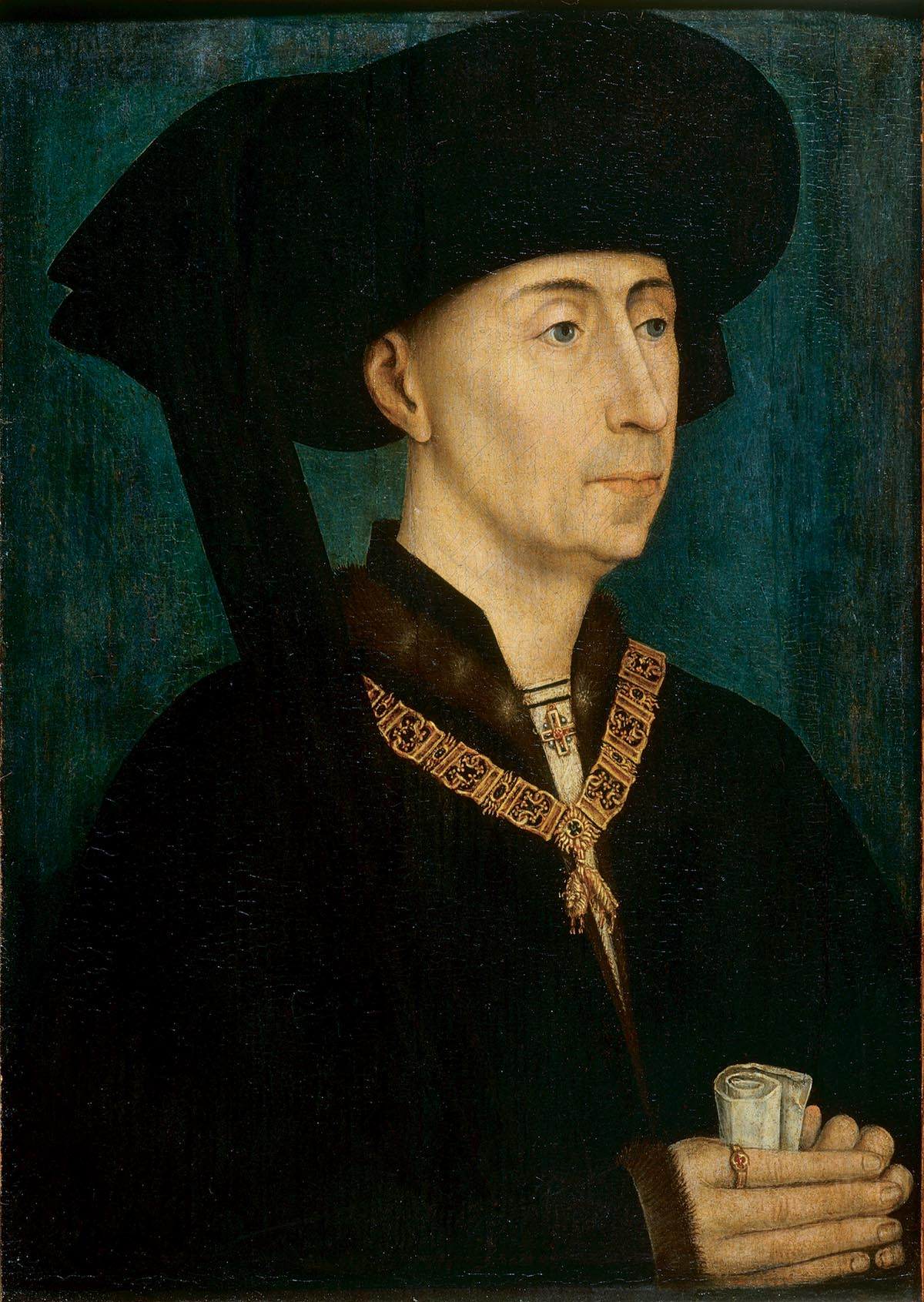
Philip III, Duke of Burgundy, with the collar of the order (portrait in c. 1450 by Rogier van der Weyden)

The Distinguished Order of the Golden Fleece is a Catholic order of chivalry founded in 1430 in Bruges by Philip the Good, Duke of Burgundy, to celebrate his marriage to Isabella of Portugal. Today, two branches of the order exist: the Spanish Fleece and the Austrian Fleece. The current grand masters are King Felipe VI of Spain, head of the House of Bourbon-Anjou and Karl von Habsburg, head of the House of Habsburg-Lorraine. The Grand Chaplain of the Austrian branch is Cardinal Christoph Schönborn, Archbishop of Vienna.

The separation of the two existing branches took place as a result of the War of the Spanish Succession of 1701–1714. The grand master of the order, Charles II of Spain (a Habsburg), had died childless in 1700, and so the right to succeed to the throne of Spain (and incidentally to become the Sovereign of the Order of the Golden Fleece) initiated a continental conflict. On one hand, Charles, brother of Holy Roman Emperor Joseph I, claimed the Spanish crown as an agnatic member of the House of Habsburg, which had inherited the Burgundian titles and had held the Spanish throne for almost two centuries. However, the late king of Spain had named Philip of Bourbon, his sister's grandchild, as his successor in his will. After the conclusion of the war in 1714, the European powers recognized Philip of Bourbon as King of Spain, but the old Burgundian Habsburg territories became the Austrian Netherlands (1714–1797), and with them went the Treasure of the Order and its archive. The two dynasties, the Bourbons of Spain and the Habsburgs of Austria, have ever since continued heading the separate orders of the Golden Fleece.

The Golden Fleece, particularly the Spanish branch, became one of the most prestigious and historic orders of chivalry in the world. De Bourgoing wrote in 1789 that "the number of knights of the Golden Fleece is very limited in Spain, and this is the order, which of all those in Europe, has best preserved its ancient splendour". Each collar is solid gold and is estimated to be worth around €50,000 as of 2018, making it the most expensive chivalrous order. Current knights of the Spanish order include Emperor Emeritus Akihito of Japan, former Tsar Simeon of Bulgaria, and Princess Beatrix of the Netherlands, among 13 others. Knights of the Austrian branch include King Philippe of Belgium, his father former King Albert II, and Grand Duke Henri of Luxembourg, among 22 others.

== Origin ==
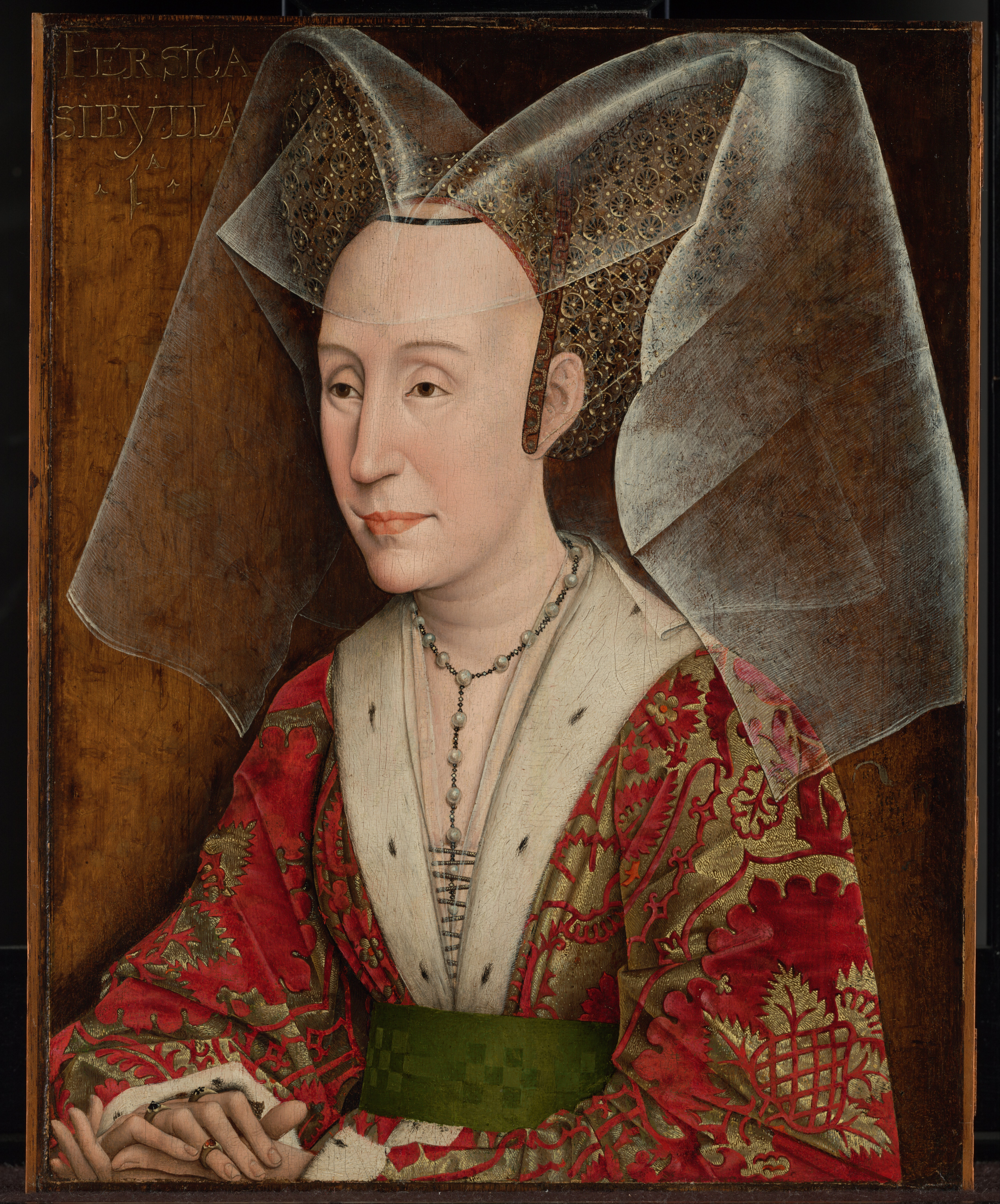
The order was founded by Philip the Good to celebrate his marriage to Portuguese princess Isabella of Avis.

The Order of the Golden Fleece was established on 10 January 1430, by Philip the Good, Duke of Burgundy (on the occasion of his wedding to Isabella of Portugal), in celebration of the prosperous and wealthy domains united in his person that ran from Flanders to Switzerland. The jester and dwarf Madame d'Or performed at the creation of the order of the Golden Fleece in Bruges. It is restricted to a limited number of knights, initially 24 but increased to 30 in 1433, and 50 in 1516, plus the sovereign. The order's first king of arms was Jean Le Fèvre de Saint-Remy. It received further privileges unusual to any order of knighthood: the sovereign undertook to consult the order before going to war; all disputes between the knights were to be settled by the order; at each chapter the deeds of each knight were held in review, and punishments and admonitions were dealt out to offenders, and to this the sovereign was expressly subject; the knights could claim as of right to be tried by their fellows on charges of rebellion, heresy and treason, and Charles V conferred on the order exclusive jurisdiction over all crimes committed by the knights; the arrest of the offender had to be by warrant signed by at least six knights, and during the process of charge and trial he remained not in prison but in the gentle custody of his fellow knights. The order, conceived in an ecclesiastical spirit in which mass and obsequies were prominent and the knights were seated in choirstalls like canons, was explicitly denied to heretics, and so became an exclusively Catholic honour during the Reformation. The officers of the order were the chancellor, the treasurer, the registrar, and the king of arms (herald, toison d'or).

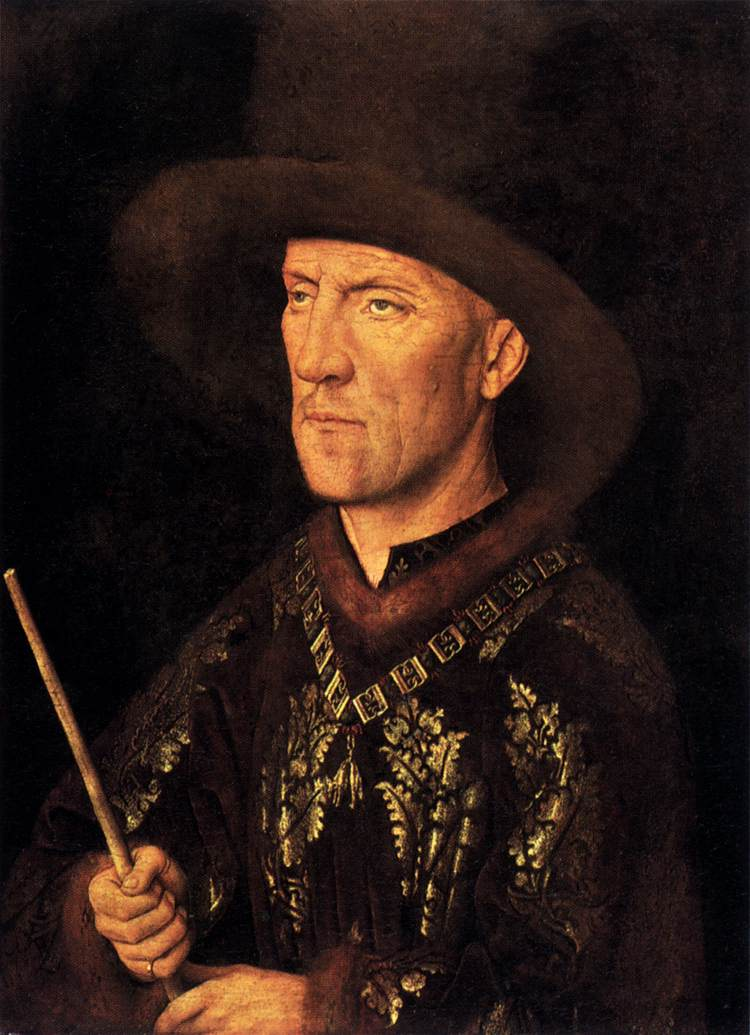
Baudouin de Lannoy, c. 1435, one of the first knights of the Golden Fleece, inducted in 1430

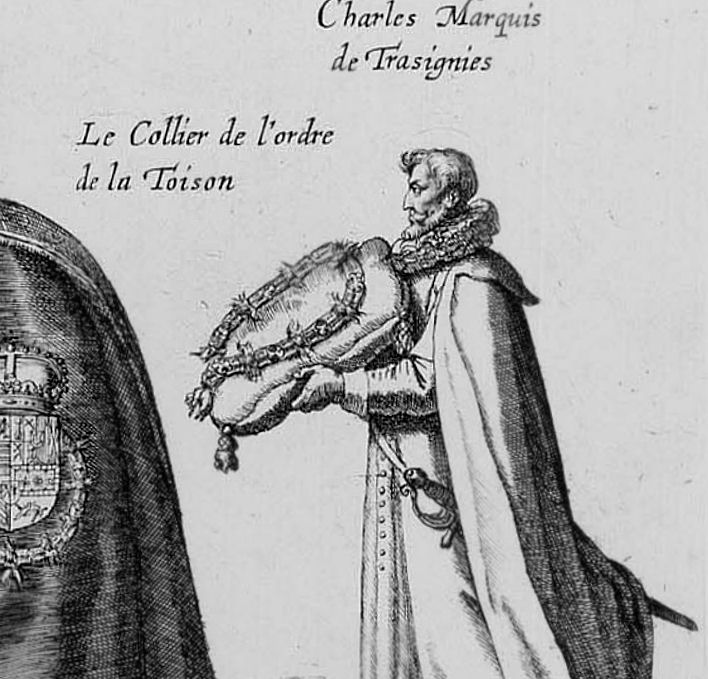
The Marquis of Trazengnies with the Insignia, funeral of Albert VII of Austria

The Duke's stated reason for founding this institution had been given in a proclamation issued following his marriage, in which he wrote that he had done so "for the reverence of God and the maintenance of our Christian Faith, and to honor and exalt the noble order of knighthood, and also ... to do honor to old knights; ... so that those who are at present still capable and strong of body and do each day the deeds pertaining to chivalry shall have cause to continue from good to better; and ... so that those knights and gentlemen who shall see worn the order ... should honor those who wear it, and be encouraged to employ themselves in noble deeds ...".

The Order of the Golden Fleece was defended from possible accusations of prideful pomp by the Burgundian court poet Michault Taillevent, who asserted that it was instituted:

Non point pour jeu ne pour esbatement,
Mais à la fin que soit attribuée
Loenge à Dieu trestout premièrement
Et aux bons gloire et haulte renommée.

Translated into English:

Not for amusement nor for recreation,
But for the purpose that praise shall be given
To God, in the very first place,
And to the good, glory and high renown.

The choice of the Golden Fleece of Colchis as the symbol of a Christian order caused some controversy, not so much because of its pagan context, which could be incorporated in chivalric ideals, as in the Nine Worthies, but because the feats of Jason, familiar to all, were not without causes of reproach, expressed in anti-Burgundian terms by Alain Chartier in his Ballade de Fougères referring to Jason as "Who, to carry off the fleece of Colchis, was willing to commit perjury." The bishop of Châlons, chancellor of the order, identified it instead with the fleece of Gideon that received the dew of Heaven (Judges 6:37).

The badge of the order, in the form of a sheepskin, was suspended from a jewelled collar of firesteels in the shape of the letter B, for Burgundy, linked by flints; with the motto Pretium Laborum Non Vile ("no mean reward for labours") engraved on the front of the central link, and Philip's motto Non Aliud ("I will have no other") on the back (non-royal knights of the Golden Fleece were forbidden to belong to any other order of knighthood).

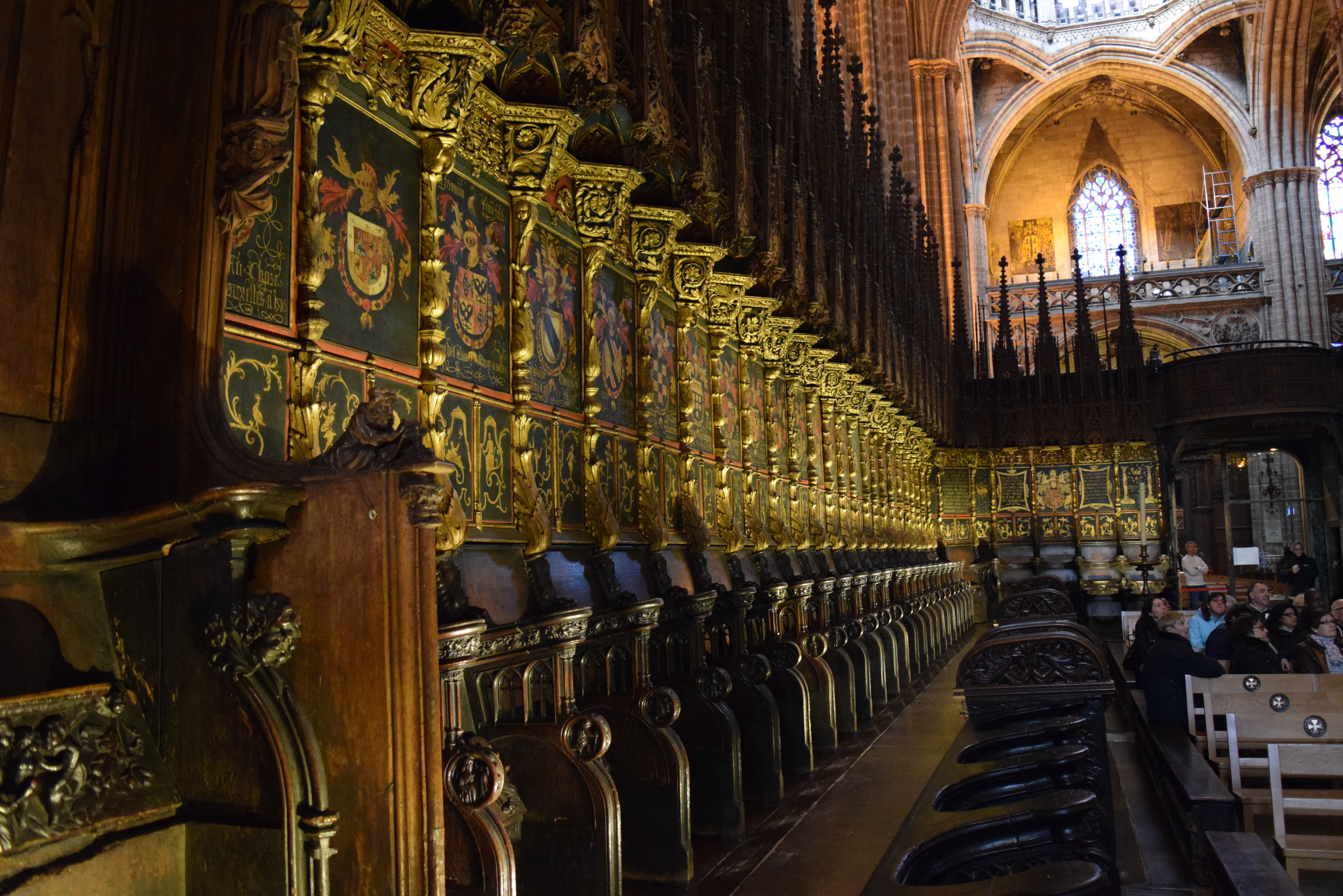
Choir at the Cathedral of Barcelona with the arms of the knights of the order in the 1519 chapter. From left to right, Fadrique Enríquez de Velasco, the dukes of Cardona, Béjar, Infantado and Alba followed by others

During this time, the Burgundian court was culturally leading in Europe and so the new order, with its festivals, ceremonies, rituals and constitution, was seen by many as a role model in the sense of a princely order based on the ideals of Christian chivalry. Aid to the Byzantine Empire or the pushing back of the Ottomans was repeatedly promoted by the Burgundian dukes in connection with their order. The Burgundian fleet actually crossed Rhodes and the Black Sea, but all of the ideas came from an extended planning phase that was not yet complete. After the death of Charles the Bold in an attempt to conquer the Duchy of Lorraine caused the extinction of the House of Burgundy in 1477, the order passed to the House of Habsburg. A few months after his marriage to the heiress Mary of Burgundy, Emperor Maximilian of Habsburg was knighted in Bruges on 30 April 1478, and then appointed sovereign (grand master) of the order. All renegade or disloyal knights of the order in the course of the subsequent War of the Burgundian Succession were expelled from the order by Maximilian. The memory of the dead was erased and their coats of arms were broken.

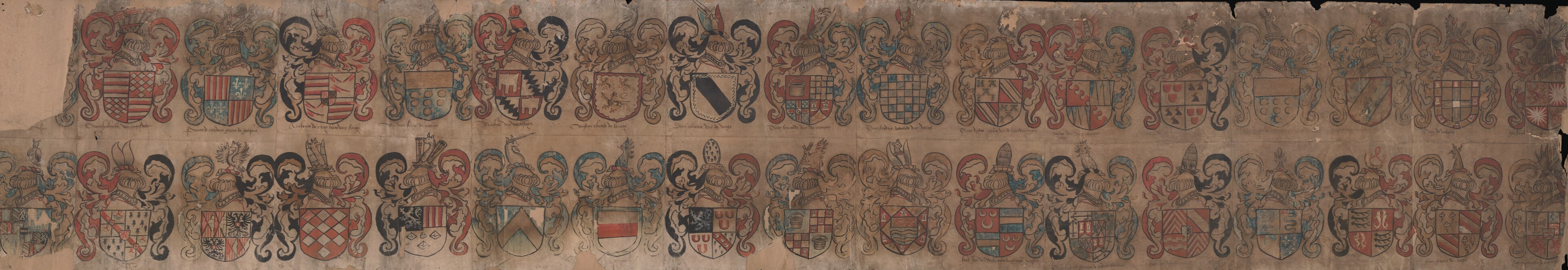
Roll of arms of the knights of the Golden Fleece. Made in the first half of the 16th century.

From Emperor Charles V or King Philip II of Spain, the sovereign was on the one hand the head of the Spanish line of the Habsburgs and on the other hand also king of Spain. Charles V was appointed head of the order at the age of 9 and identified himself strongly with this community throughout his life. The ideal of chivalrous and brave living was brought to him by William de Croÿ. When in 1700 Charles II of Spain died childless, both the Habsburgs from the Habsburg lands and the Bourbons, as the new kings of Spain, claimed sovereignty of the order. Both noble houses basically invoked their claims regarding the Spanish crown. The House of Habsburg's claim relied on Article 65 of the Statutes. Holy Roman Emperor Charles VI was able to claim sovereignty of the Netherlands, the Burgundian heartland, during the War of the Spanish Succession and thus he could celebrate the order's festival in Vienna in 1713. As with Maximilian I or Charles V, the order was again closely associated with the Holy Roman Empire. Regardless of this, the order was divided into two lines. The Habsburg order owns the archive and the old insignia and adheres more to the original statutes.

== Spanish order ==
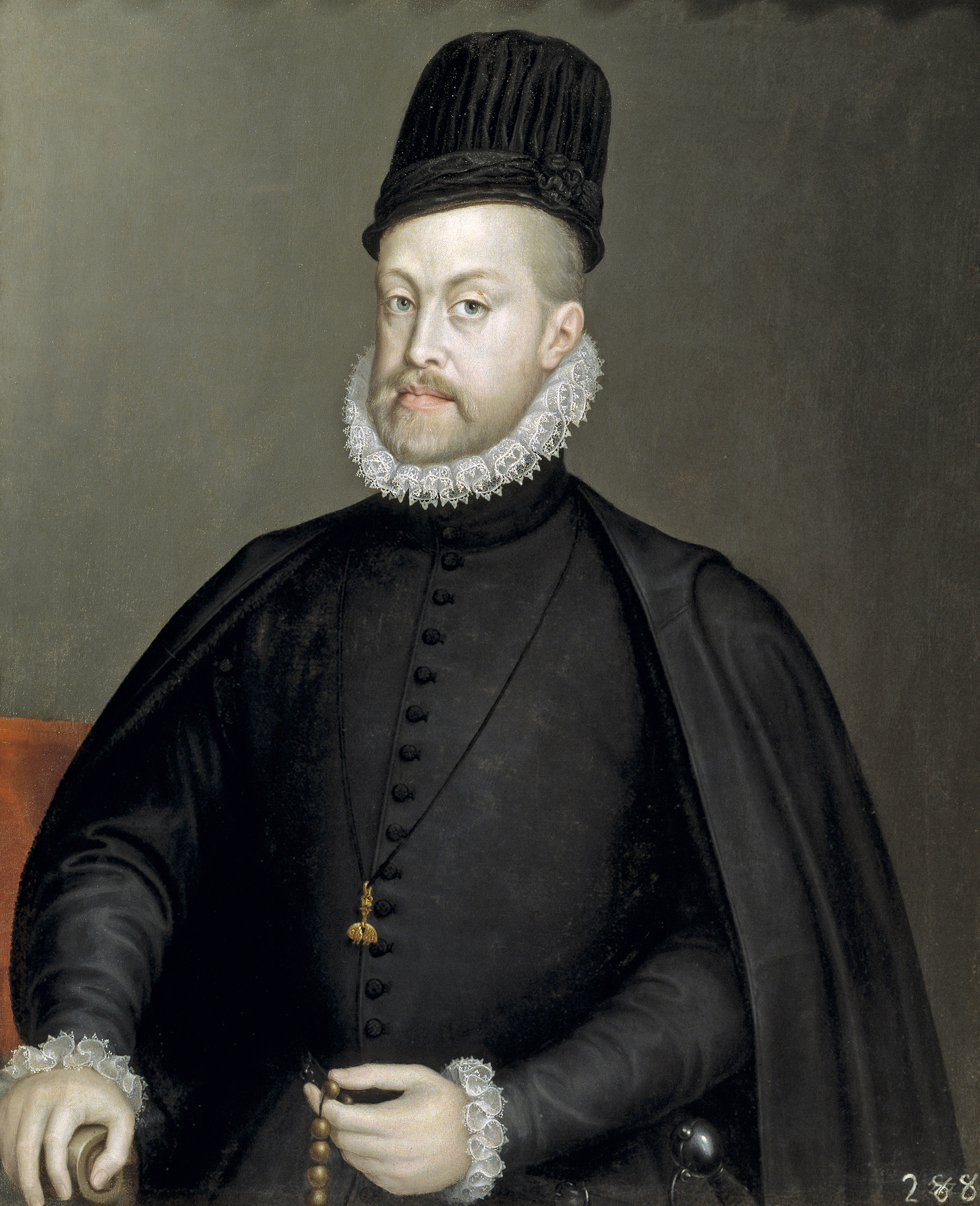
Portrait of Philip II of Spain wearing the Golden Fleece, by Sofonisba Anguissola (1565)

With the absorption of the Burgundian lands into the Spanish Habsburg empire, the sovereignty of the order passed to the Habsburg kings of Spain, where it remained until the death of the last of the Spanish Habsburgs, Charles II, in 1700. He was succeeded as king by Philip V, a Bourbon. The dispute between Philip and the Habsburg pretender to the Spanish throne, the Archduke Charles, led to the War of the Spanish Succession, and also resulted in the division of the order into Spanish and Austrian branches. In either case the sovereign, as Duke of Burgundy, writes the letter of appointment in French.

The controversial conferral of the Fleece on Napoleon and his brother Joseph, while Spain was occupied by French troops, angered the exiled king of France, Louis XVIII, and caused him to return his collar in protest. These, and other awards by Joseph, were revoked by King Ferdinand VII on the restoration of Bourbon rule in 1813. Napoleon created by order of 15 August 1809 the Order of the Three Golden Fleeces, in view of his sovereignty over Austria, Spain and Burgundy. This was opposed by Joseph I of Spain and appointments to the new order were never made.

In 1812, the acting government of Spain conferred the Fleece upon the Duke of Wellington, an act confirmed by Ferdinand on his resumption of power, with the approval of Pope Pius VII. Wellington therefore became the first Protestant to be honoured with the Golden Fleece. It has subsequently also been conferred upon non-Christians, such as Bhumibol Adulyadej, King of Thailand.

There was another crisis in 1833 when Isabella II became Queen of Spain in defiance of Salic Law that did not allow women to become heads of state. Her right to confer the Fleece was challenged by Spanish Carlists.

Sovereignty remained with the head of the Spanish House of Bourbon during the republican (1931–1939) and Francoist (1939–1975) periods, and is held today by the present king of Spain, Felipe VI. There is confusion towards the conferral of the Fleece on Francisco Franco in 1972. The order was illegally offered by Infante Jaime to him on the occasion of his son's wedding to the dictator's granddaughter, Carmen. Franco kindly refused the order on the basis of legitimacy, stating that the Golden Fleece could only be granted by the reigning king of Spain. Moreover, the right of conferral was in any case a prerogative of Jaime's younger brother, Infante Juan, as designated heir to the throne of Spain by his father Alfonso XIII.

Knights of the order are entitled to be addressed with the style His/Her Excellency in front of their name.

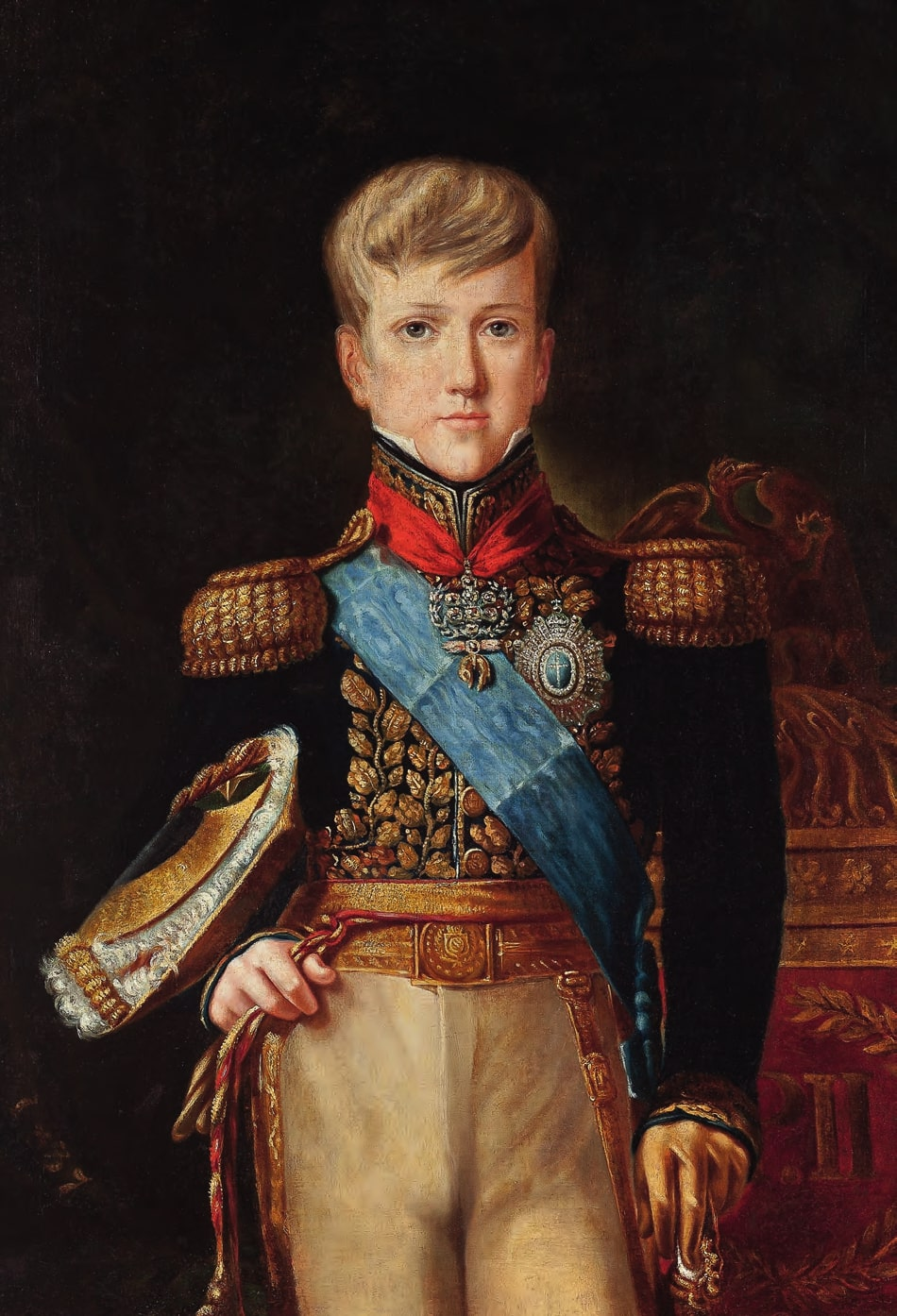
12-year-old Emperor Pedro II of Brazil wearing the Spanish Fleece in 1838

=== Grand masters of the order ===
- Charles I (1516–1556)
- Philip II (1556–1598)
- Philip III (1598–1621)
- Philip IV (1621–1665)
- Charles II (1665–1700)
- Philip V (1700–1724)
- Louis I (1724–1724)
- Philip V (1724–1746)
- Ferdinand VI (1746–1759)
- Charles III (1759–1788)
- Charles IV (1788–1808)
- Ferdinand VII (1808–1833)
- Isabella II (1833–1870)
- Amadeo I (1870–1873)
- Alfonso XII (1874–1885)
- Alfonso XIII (1886–1941)
- Juan, Count of Barcelona (1941–1977)
- Juan Carlos I (1977–2014)
- Felipe VI (2014–present)

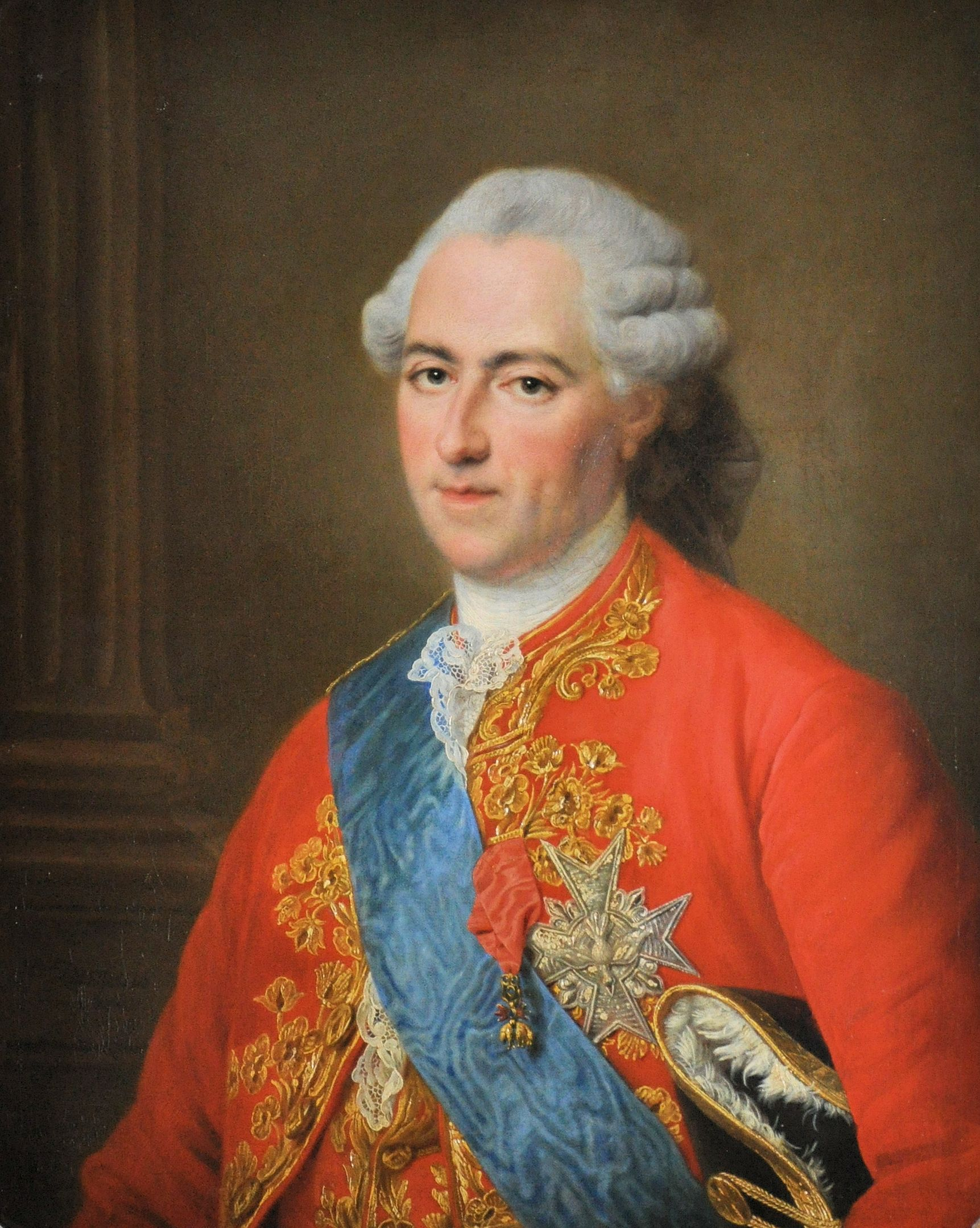
Louis XV wearing the Spanish Fleece in 1773

=== Living members ===
Below is a list of the living knights and dames, in chronological order and, in the first sets of brackets, the years when they were inducted into the order:

1. Juan Carlos I of Spain (1941), as crown prince; king (1975–2014)
2. Felipe VI of Spain (1981), as crown prince; king (2014–present)
3. Carl XVI Gustaf of Sweden (1983), as king (1983–present)
4. Akihito of Japan (1985), as crown prince; emperor (1989–2019)
5. Beatrix of the Netherlands (1985), as queen (1980–2013)
6. Margrethe II of Denmark (1985), as queen (1972–2024)
7. Albert II of Belgium (1994), as king (1993–2013)
8. Simeon Saxe-Coburg-Gotha (2004), as prime minister of Bulgaria (2001–2005); tsar (1943–1946)
9. Henri of Luxembourg (2007), as grand duke (2000–2025)
10. Javier Solana (2010), a Spanish politician
11. Víctor García de la Concha (2010), as director of the Royal Spanish Academy (1998–2010); director of the Cervantes Institute (2012–2017)
12. Nicolas Sarkozy (2011), as president of France and co-prince of Andorra (2007–2012)
13. Enrique V. Iglesias (2014), an economist of Spain and Uruguay
14. Leonor of Spain (2015, presented 2018), as crown princess (2014–present)
15. Sofía of Spain (2024, presented 2025), as queen mother; queen consort (1975–2014)
16. Felipe González (2025), former prime minister of Spain (1982–1996)
17. Miguel Herrero y Rodríguez de Miñón (2025), a father of the Spanish constitution
18. Miquel Roca (2025), a father of the Spanish constitution
19. Marcelo Rebelo de Sousa (2026), former president of Portugal (2016–2026)

=== Armorial of the Spanish Golden Fleece ===
Coats of arms of current Knights of the Spanish Golden Fleece

The King of Spain	The Princess of Asturias	King Juan Carlos of Spain
Queen Sofía of Spain	Javier Solana	Víctor García de la Concha
Enrique V. Iglesias	Felipe González	Miguel Herrero y Rodríguez de Miñón
Miquel Roca

== Austrian order ==
Imperial Coat of Arms of the Austro-Hungarian Empire with the Golden Fleece

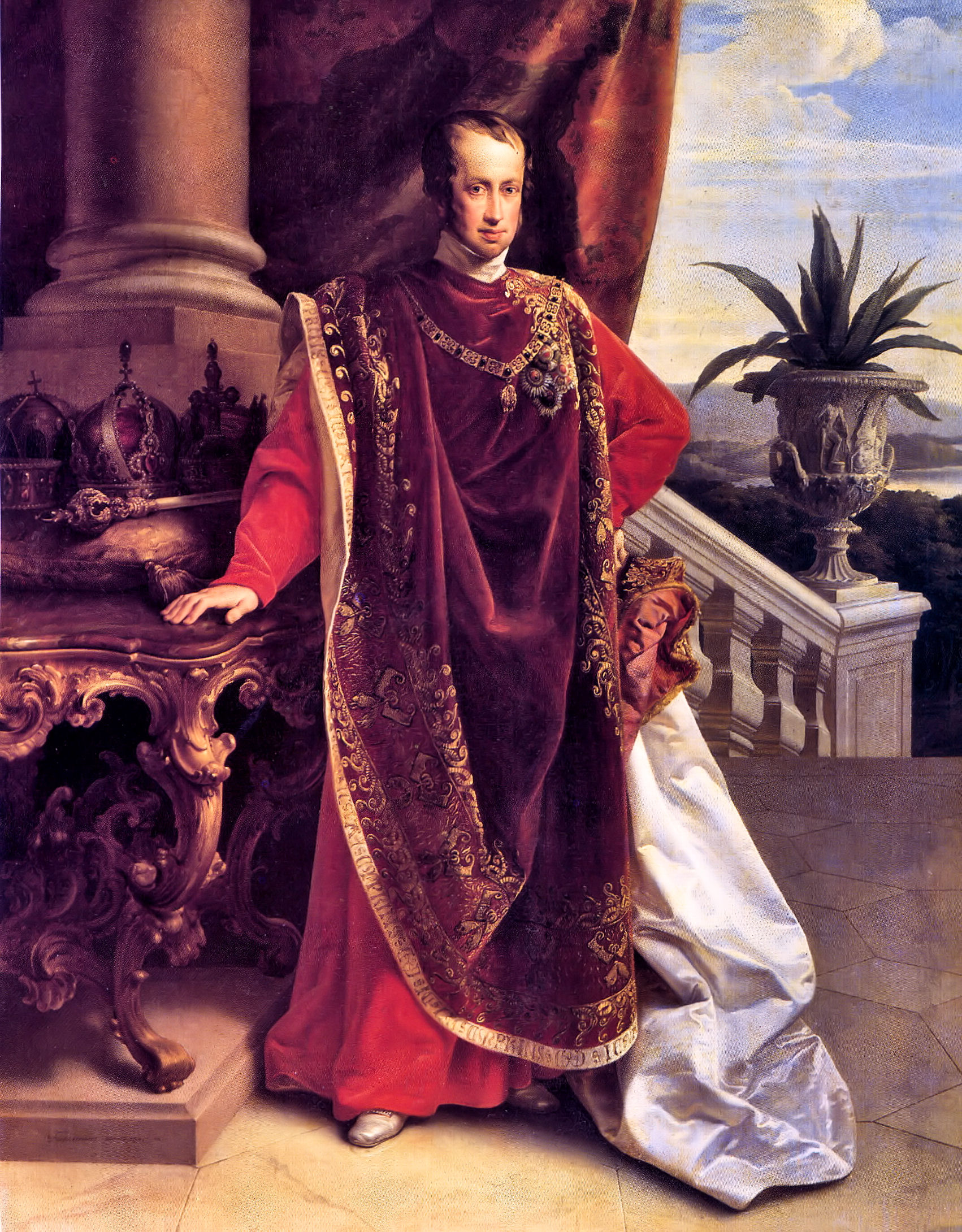
Ferdinand I, Emperor of Austria, as grand master of the Austrian branch

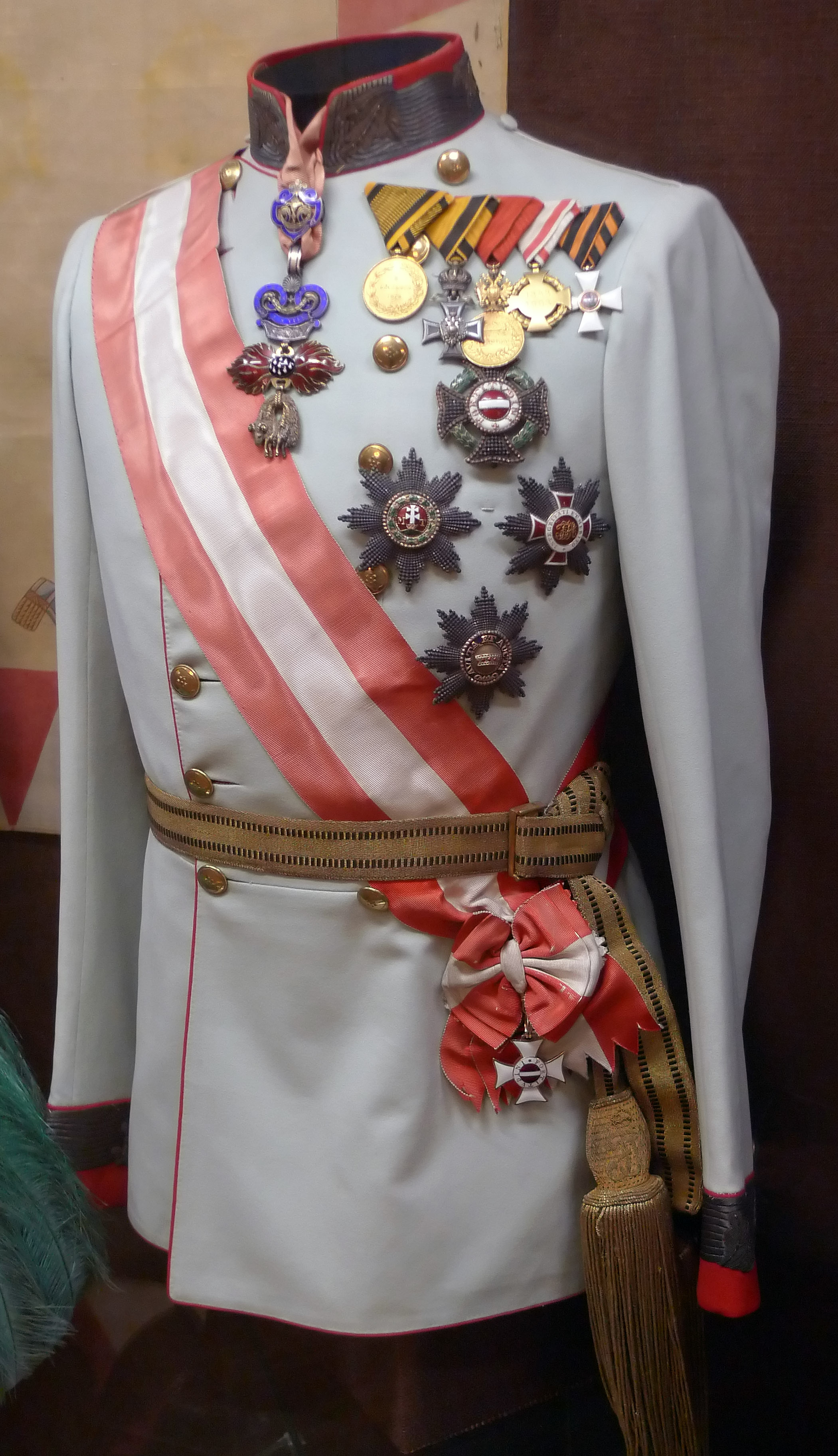
Gala uniform of Emperor Franz Joseph, with the insigna around the neck

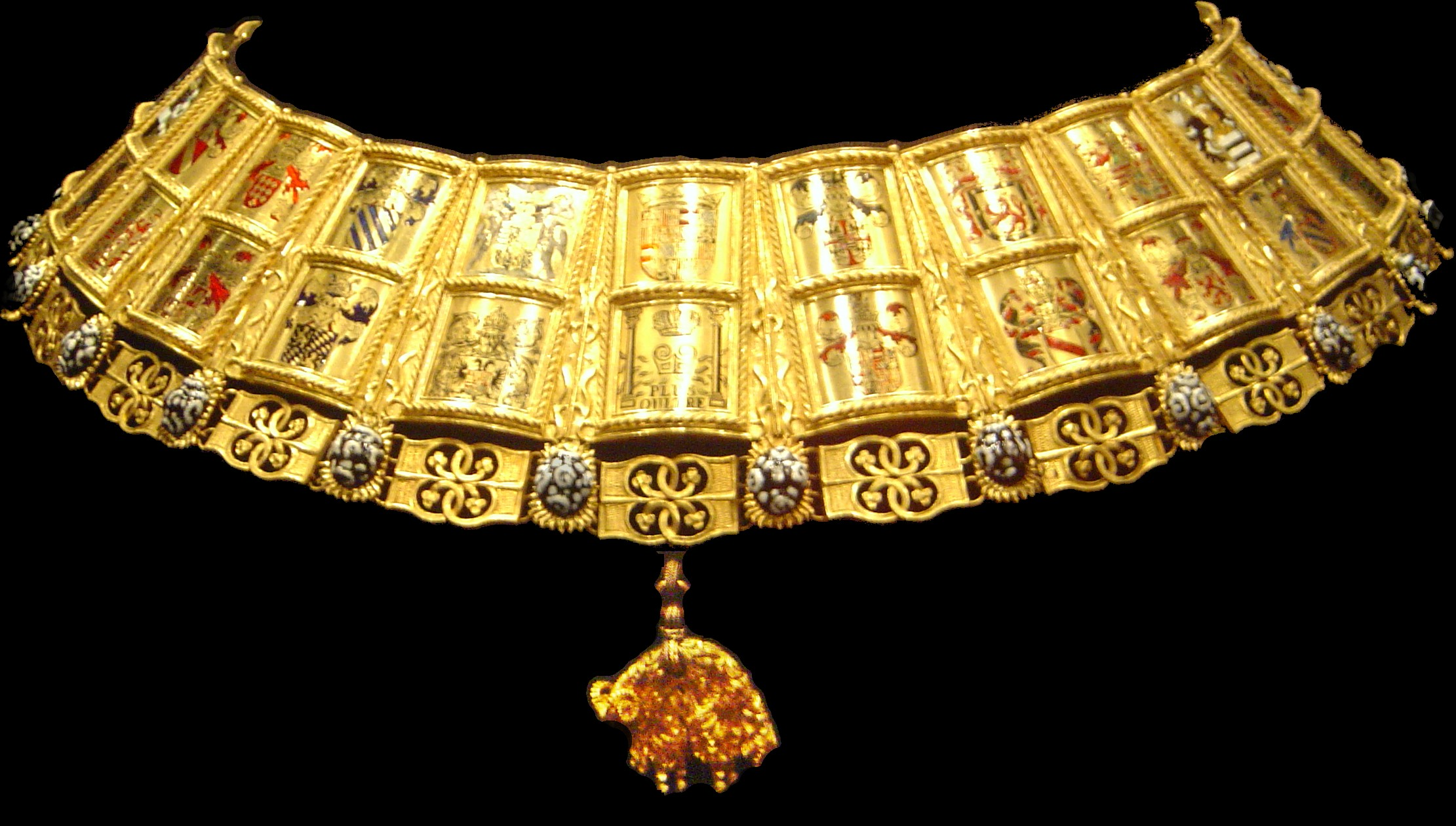
Potence or neck collar of the king of arms to the order

The problem of female inheritance was avoided on the accession of Maria Theresa in 1740, as sovereignty of the order passed not to herself but to her husband, Francis.

The entire treasure of the order, which also includes the "Ainkhürn sword" of the last duke of Burgundy and the centuries-old oath cross, which is said to contain a splinter of the True Cross, is located in the Vienna Treasury and, like the archive and the old insignia, is the property of the Habsburg branch.

Upon the collapse of the Austrian monarchy after the First World War, King Albert I of Belgium requested that the sovereignty and treasure of the order be transferred to him as the ruler of the former Habsburg lands of Burgundy. This claim was seriously considered by the victorious Allies at Versailles but was eventually rejected due to the intervention of King Alfonso XIII of Spain, who took possession of the property of the order on behalf of the dethroned emperor, Charles I of Austria.

Nazi Germany classified the order as hostile to the state and tried to confiscate the entire treasure of the order including the archive. Hitler categorically rejected the centuries-old Habsburg principles of "live and let live" in relation to ethnic groups, peoples, minorities, religions, cultures and languages, and also wanted to seize significant works of art that are unique worldwide. Hitler intended to decide on the use of the assets after they had been confiscated. After the annexation of Austria in 1938, Max von Hohenberg, Habsburg representative in the affairs of the order, was immediately sent to a concentration camp.

After the Second World War in 1953, the Republic of Austria continued to confirm to the House of Habsburg the right to the order on its territory, in particular that the order has its own legal personality. As a result, the order itself remains the owner of the treasure and the archive. The treasure includes the oath cross from 1401/02, the golden collar of office for the herald (1517), collars of the order (approx. 1560), vestments and historical relics.

Sovereignty of the Austrian branch remains with the head of the House of Habsburg, which was handed over on 20 November 2000 by Otto von Habsburg to his elder son, Karl von Habsburg.

The order's day is 30 November (feast day of St. Andrew the Apostle, patron saint of Burgundy), when new members are admitted. The treasures are in the Vienna Treasury and in the Austrian State Archives. To date, the new knights and officers take the oath in front of the so-called "oath cross", which is kept in the treasury in Vienna. It is a simply designed golden cross set with precious stones (sapphires, rubies and pearls). In the central part of the cross there is a splinter of the Holy Cross, which makes it a relic cross.

=== Grand masters of the order ===
- Emperor Charles VI (1711–1740)
- Emperor Francis I (1740–1765)
- Emperor Joseph II (1765–1790)
- Emperor Leopold II (1790–1792)
- Emperor Francis II (1792–1835)
- Emperor Ferdinand I (1835–1848)
- Emperor Franz Joseph I (1848–1916)
- Emperor Charles I (1916–1922)
- Archduke Otto von Habsburg (1922–2011)
- Archduke Karl von Habsburg (2011–present)

=== Living members ===
Below a list of the names of the known living knights, followed in parentheses by the date, when known, of their induction into the order:

- Franz, Duke of Bavaria (1960)
- Archduke Karl of Austria (1961) – sovereign (grand master) of the order since 2000
- Archduke Andreas Salvator of Austria, Prince of Tuscany
- Archduke Carl Salvator of Austria, Prince of Tuscany
- Prince Lorenz of Belgium, Archduke of Austria-Este
- Archduke Michael of Austria
- Archduke Michael Salvator of Austria, Prince of Tuscany
- Archduke Georg of Austria
- Archduke Carl Christian of Austria
- King Albert II of Belgium
- Hans-Adam II, Prince of Liechtenstein
- Duarte Pio, Duke of Braganza
- Archduke Joseph of Austria (born 1960)
- The Prince of Löwenstein-Wertheim-Rosenberg
- Mariano Hugo, Prince of Windisch-Graetz
- Baron Johann Friedrich of Solemacher-Antweiler
- Kubrat, Prince of Panagyurishte (2002)
- Philippe of Belgium (2008)
- Michel, Prince of Ligne (2011)
- Prince Charles-Louis de Merode (2011)
- Archduke Ferdinand Zvonimir of Austria
- Alexander, Margrave of Meissen (2012)
- Zsolt Semjén (2022)
- Archduke Eduard of Austria
- Prince Ferdinand zu Schwarzenberg (2024)

=== Officers ===
- Chancellor: Count Alexander von Pachta-Reyhofen (since 2005)
- Grand chaplain: Christoph Cardinal Schönborn, Archbishop of Vienna (since 1992)
- Chaplain: Count Gregor Henckel-Donnersmarck (since 2007)
- Treasurer: Baron Wulf Gordian von Hauser (since 1992)
- Registrar: Count Karl-Philipp von Clam-Martinic (since 2007)
- King of Arms: Baron Georg von Frölichsthal (since 2022)

== Chapters of the order ==
Number	Date	City	Temple	Sovereign/Grand Master
I	30 November 1431	Lille	Saint-Pierre's Collegiate Church	Philip III of Burgundy
II	30 November 1432	Bruges	St. Donatian's Cathedral	Philip III of Burgundy
III	30 November 1433	Dijon	Sainte-Chapelle	Philip III of Burgundy
IV	30 November 1435	Brussels	Cathedral of St. Michael and St. Gudula	Philip III of Burgundy
V	30 November 1436	Lille	Saint-Pierre's Collegiate Church	Philip III of Burgundy
VI	30 November 1440	Saint-Omer	Abbey of Saint Bertin	Philip III of Burgundy
VII	30 November 1445	Ghent	Saint Bavo Cathedral	Philip III of Burgundy
VIII	2 May 1451	Mons	Sainte-Waudru's Collegiate Church	Philip III of Burgundy
IX	2 May 1456	The Hague	Grote or Sint-Jacobskerk	Philip III of Burgundy
X	2 May 1461	Saint-Omer	Abbey of Saint Bertin	Philip III of Burgundy
XI	2 May 1468	Bruges	Church of Our Lady	Charles I of Burgundy
XII	2 May 1473	Valenciennes	St. Paul 's Church	Charles I of Burgundy
XIII	30 April 1478	Bruges	St. Salvator's Cathedral	Maximilian of Austria (regent of the order)
XIV	6 May 1481	's-Hertogenbosch	St. John's Cathedral	Maximilian of Austria
XV	24 May 1491	Mechelen	St. Rumbold's Cathedral	Philip I of Castile
XVI	17 January 1501	Brussels	Chapel of the Carmelite Convent	Philip I of Castile
XVII	17 December 1505	Middelburg		Philip I of Castile
XVIII	October 1516	Brussels	Cathedral of St. Michael and St. Gudula	Charles I of Spain (Charles V, Holy Roman Emperor)
XIX	5–8 March 1519	Barcelona	Cathedral of the Holy Cross and St. Eulalia	Charles I of Spain
XX	3 December 1531	Tournai	Cathedral of Our Lady	Charles I of Spain
XXI	2 January 1546	Utrecht	St. Martin's Cathedral	Charles I of Spain
XXII	26 January 1555	Antwerp	Cathedral of Our Lady	Philip II of Spain
XXIII	29 July 1559	Ghent	Saint Bavo Cathedral	Philip II of Spain

Source: Livre du toison d'or, online, fols. 4r-66r

== Insignia ==
Collar (Spanish and Austrian branches)

Spanish branch		Austrian branch
Sovereign's neck insignia	Neck and lapel insignia	Neck insignia

== Privileges ==
Knights of the order enjoy a variety of privileges. Some privileges are shared, while others differ due to split of the order in 1700 and they henceforth developed their own characteristics. The Spanish order has developed into a state order of merit, while the Austrian order has remained a Catholic order of knighthood with a strong bond of brotherhood.

=== Heraldry ===
Jean-Baptiste Christyn (1630–1690) records and codifies the heraldic privilege of golden helmets during his time as Chancellor of Brabant (1687–1690). He was considered a leading authority on heraldic law in the Habsburg Netherlands by contemporaries, and discusses it in his work Jurisprudentia heroica (part 2, page 19). The privilege of the golden helmets was based on the practices observed at the chapters of the order.

Coats of arms with golden helmets
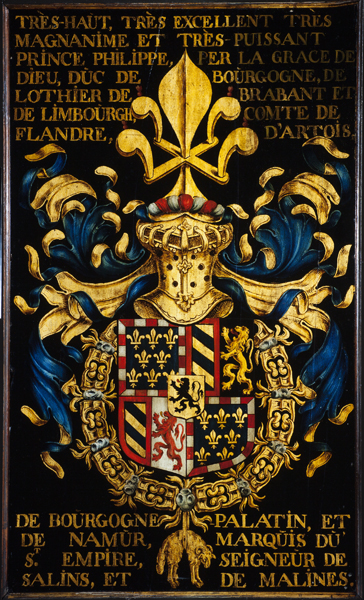
Escutcheon of Philip III, Philip The Good

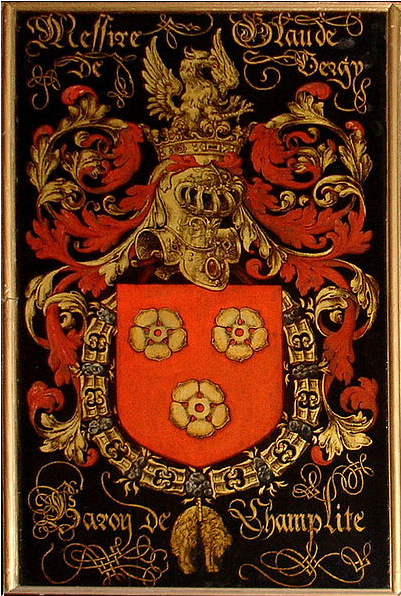
Escutcheon of Claude de Vergy (1495–1560?)

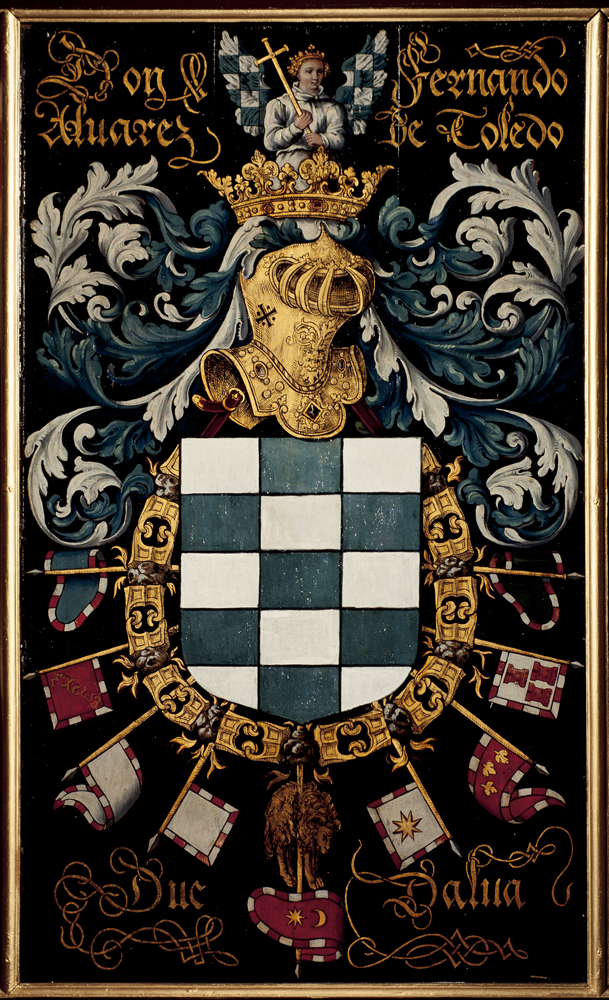
Escutcheon of Fernando Álvarez de Toledo, 3rd Duke of Alba

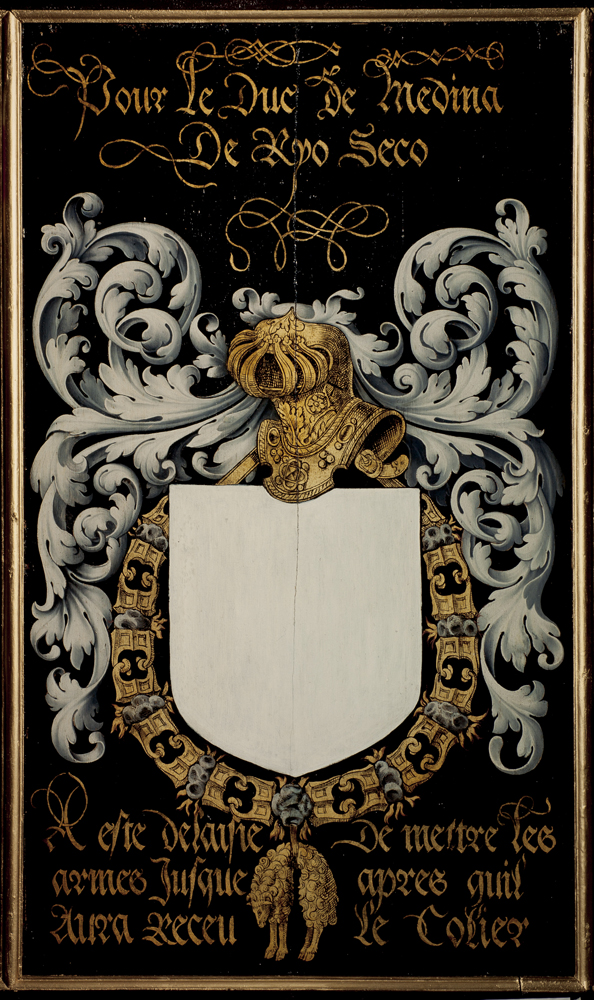
Duke of Medina de Rioseco
Selection of CoAs at the Sint-Baafskathedraal, Gent, Oost-Vlaanderen, Belgium.

=== Form of address ===
The bond of knights within the brotherhood was enforced with the privilege to address each other in writing and when greeting one and another in person with "Mon Cousin."

=== Holy Mass and altar ===
Pope Pius X reestablished in 1913 the privilege that Knights of the Austrian Order of the Golden Fleece have the right to deem a location as worthy for holding a Holy Mass. The celebration of a Holy Mass on non-sacred ground, e.g. at home, is usually only possible with the permission of the local bishop. Knights may do so without asking for permission.

A derivative privilege from the above-mentioned right is the possibility to possess and use a personal, portable altar. This enables a knight to raise an altar wherever he deems it suitable in order to hold a Holy Mass. This privilege stems from the medieval and annulled right to hold the Holy Mass at the sick-bed of a knight.

== See also ==
- List of knights of the Golden Fleece
- Order of the Starry Cross, female equivalent to the Austrian Fleece

== Literature ==
- Weltliche und Geistliche Schatzkammer. Bildführer. Kunsthistorischen Museum, Vienna. 1987. ISBN 3-7017-0499-6
- Fillitz, Hermann. Die Schatzkammer in Wien: Symbole abendländischen Kaisertums. Vienna, 1986. ISBN 3-7017-0443-0
- Fillitz, Hermann. Der Schatz des Ordens vom Goldenen Vlies. Vienna, 1988. ISBN 3-7017-0541-0
- Boulton, D'Arcy Jonathan Dacre, 1987. The Knights of The Crown: The Monarchical Orders of Knighthood in Later Medieval Europe, 1325–1520, Woodbridge, Suffolk (Boydell Press), (revised edition 2000)
