= Madame d'Or =

French jester

- Died: after 1429
- Occupation: Court jester
- Known for: "very graceful fool"

Madame d'Or (d. after 1429) was a French jester. The chronicler St Remy described her as a "moult gracieuse folle" (in English, something like "very graceful fool").

In 1429 Madame d'Or performed at the inauguration of the Order of the Golden Fleece in Bruges, Belgium. Simeon Luce described her as "a dwarf no higher than a boot" and "gymnast of incomparable beauty, nimbleness, and athletic vigor" as related in Andrew Lang's biography of Joan of Arc.

The Mitolo winery in the Australian wine region of McLaren Vale named a bottle of wine for Madame d'Or in 2013.
