= Shakespearean fool =

Character archetype recurring in the works of William Shakespeare

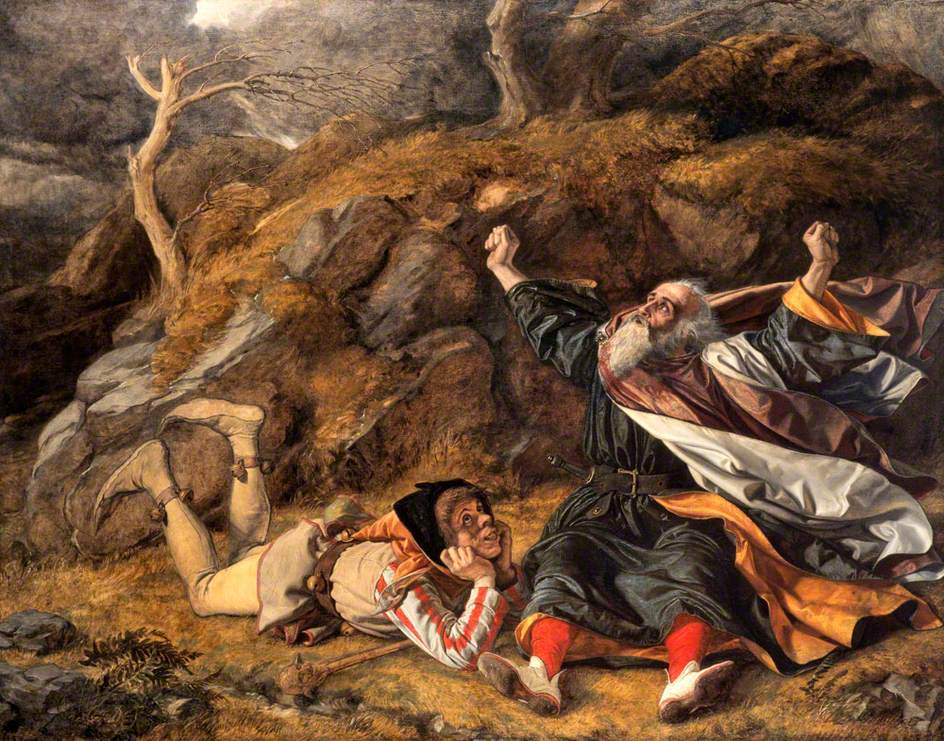
King Lear and the Fool in the Storm by William Dyce

The Shakespearean fool is a recurring character type in the works of William Shakespeare. They are usually clever peasants or commoners who use their wits to outdo people of higher social standing. In this sense, they are similar to the real fools, and jesters of the time, but their characteristics are greatly heightened for theatrical effect.

== The Fool ==
Fools have entertained a varied public from Roman through Medieval times. The fool perhaps reached its pre-Shakespearean heights as the jester in aristocratic courts across Europe. The jester played a dynamic and changing role in entertaining aristocratic households in a wide variety of ways: songs, music, storytelling, medieval satire, physical comedy and, to a lesser extent, juggling and acrobatics. Shakespeare not only borrowed from this multi-talented jester tradition, but contributed significantly to its rethinking. Whereas the court jester often regaled his audience with various skills aimed to amuse, Shakespeare's fool, consistent with Shakespeare's revolutionary ideas about theater, became a complex character who could highlight more important issues. Like Shakespeare's other characters, the fool began to speak outside of the narrow confines of exemplary morality. Shakespeare's fools address themes of love, psychic turmoil, personal identity, and many other innumerable themes that arise in Shakespeare, and in modern theater.

Shakespeare's earlier fools often seem to be written for the particular talents of Elizabethan actor William Kempe. After Kempe left the troupe, Shakespeare's comic characters changed dramatically. Kempe was known for his improvising, and Hamlet contains a complaint at improvisational clowning (Act 3, Scene 2). Perhaps central to the Bard's redrawing of the fool was the actor Robert Armin:

... Shakespeare created a whole series of domestic fools for [Armin]. [His] greatest roles, Touchstone in "As You Like It,"(1599), Feste in "Twelfth Night,"(1600), and (the) fool in "King Lear,"(1605); helped Shakespeare resolve the tension between thematic material and the traditional entertainment role of the fool. Armin became a counter-point to the themes of the play and the power relationships between the theater and the role of the fool--he manipulates the extra dimension between play and reality to interact with the audience all the while using the themes of the play as his source material. Shakespeare began to write well-developed sub-plots expressly for Armin's talents. A balance between the order of the play and the carnivalised inversion factor of festive energy was achieved.

Armin was a major intellectual influence on Shakespeare's fools. He was attuned to the intellectual tradition of the Renaissance fool yet intellectual enough to understand the power of the medieval tradition. Armin's fool is a stage presence rather than a solo artist. His major skills were mime and mimicry; even his improvisational material had to be reworked and rehearsed. His greatest asset was as a foil to the other stage actors. Armin offered the audience an idiosyncratic response to the idiosyncrasies of each spectator.

== Dramatic function ==
'That, of course, is the great secret of the successful fool – that he is no fool at all.'

Isaac Asimov, Guide to Shakespeare.

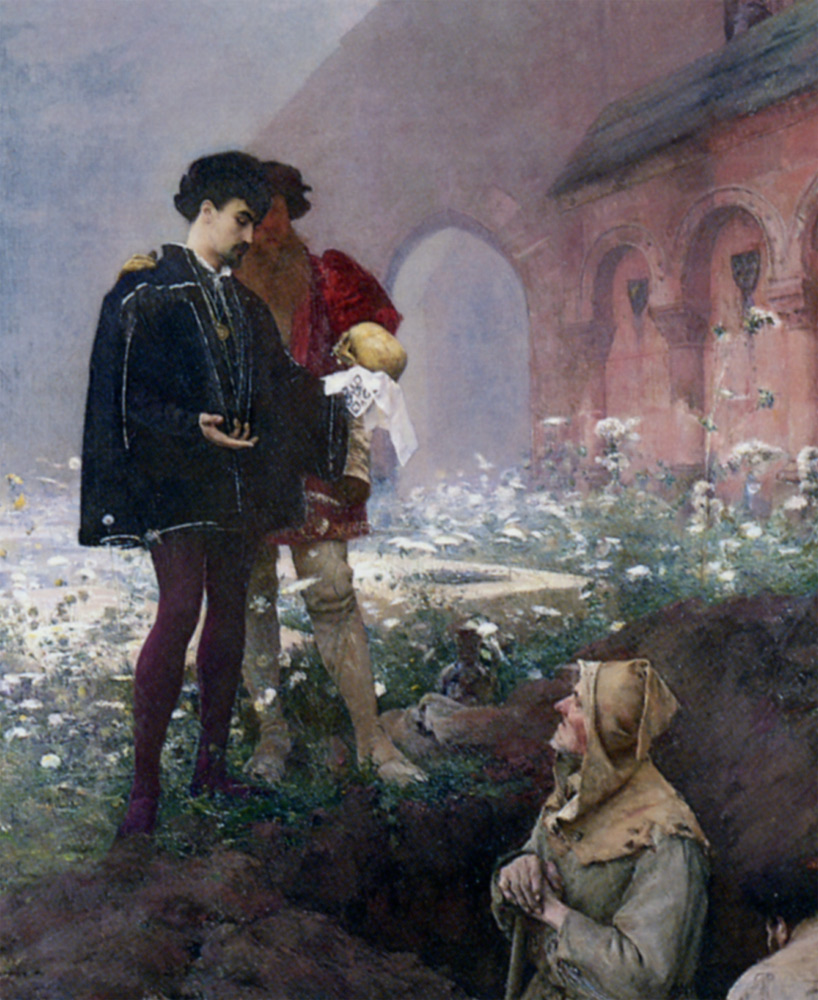
Pascal Dagnan-Bouveret - Hamlet and the Gravediggers

One scholar agrees that the clowning in Shakespeare's plays may have been intended as "an emotional vacation from the more serious business of the main action," in other words, comic relief. Clowning scenes in Shakespeare's tragedies mostly appear immediately after a truly horrific scene: the Gravediggers in Hamlet after Ophelia's suicide; the Porter in Macbeth just after the murder of the King; and as Cleopatra prepares herself for death in Antony and Cleopatra. Others argue that Shakespeare's clowning goes beyond just comic relief, instead making the horrific or deeply complex scenes more understandable and "true to the realities of living, then and now." Shifting the focus from the fictional world to the audience's reality helps convey "more effectively the theme of the dramas."

As Shakespeare's fools speak truth to the other characters, they also speak truth to the audience. For example, Feste, in Twelfth Night, reinforces the theme of love with his song in the second act to Sir Toby and Sir Andrew:

What is love? ’tis not hereafter,
Present mirth hath present laughter;
What’s to come is still unsure:
In delay there lies no plenty,—
Then come kiss me, Sweet-and-twenty,
Youth’s a stuff will not endure. (II.iii.52).

Shakespeare closes the play with Feste alone on the stage, singing directly to the audience "of man's inexorable progress from childhood's holiday realm ... into age, vice, disillusionment, and death. ... [This] pessimism is informed and sweetened, however, not only by the music to which it is set, but by the tolerance and acceptance of Feste himself."

== List of Shakespearean fools ==
- A Fool in Timon of Athens
- Autolycus in The Winter's Tale – although arguments can also be made for the Shepherd's Son, also known as Yokel.
- Citizen in Julius Caesar
- Cloten in Cymbeline
- Clown in Othello
- Clown in Titus Andronicus
- Costard in Love's Labours Lost – This clown is referred to as a "fool" in Act V, scene ii, but the word in this context simply refers to a silly man. He is not simple enough to be considered a natural fool, and not witty enough to be considered an artificial one. He is rather just a man from the country.
- Dogberry in Much Ado About Nothing
- Dromio of Ephesus in The Comedy of Errors
- Dromio of Syracuse in The Comedy of Errors
- Falstaff in Henry IV, Part 1 and Henry IV, Part 2
- Feste in Twelfth Night – One of Shakespeare's most multi-faceted clowns, Feste is employed by Olivia, but is equally at home in Orsino's house. Feste, the "wise fool," provides more than wit or entertainment, and is in fact the voice for the play's most important themes. Detached from particular loyalties, he can be trusted to speak truth not only to the other characters but also to the audience.
- Grumio in The Taming of the Shrew
- Launce in Two Gentlemen of Verona – Launce is simple and pastoral. There is no mention of specific dress, or any indications of his or Speed's being a domestic fool or jester.
- Launcelot Gobbo in The Merchant of Venice – Nowhere in the play does Gobbo do anything that qualifies him as an official fool or jester. Still, he is considered as such, perhaps because he is called a "patch" and a fool, and also because of his (and his father's) malapropisms ("This is the very defect of the matter sir," "Tears exhibit my tongue"). It is possible that these terms refer rather to the idea of the clown. Either way, Gobbo is proof that Shakespeare did not necessarily constantly discriminate in his qualifications of clowns, fools, and jesters.
- Lavache in All's Well That Ends Well – similar to Touchstone, he is a domestic fool, considered by modern terms one of Shakespeare's least funny clowns, as his speech is bitter and his wit dark.
- Mercutio in Romeo and Juliet - While not a jester or working-class character, Mercutio provides a mocking wit and a wise outsider’s perspective to the Capulet-Montague feud. His violent death signals that the play will not have a comedic resolution.
- Nick Bottom in A Midsummer Night's Dream
- Pompey in Measure for Measure – While this clown is the employee of a brothel, he can still be considered a domestic fool.
- Puck in A Midsummer Night's Dream – Jester to the fairy king, Oberon, Puck comes closer to being the play's protagonist than any other Shakespearean fool. Though Bottom shares the fool role, Puck plays the more traditional fool, because he's genuinely clever and wise.
- Speed in Two Gentlemen of Verona – Speed is a clever and witty servant. There is no mention of specific dress, or any indications of his or Launce's being a domestic fool or jester.
- The Fool in King Lear – The Royal Shakespeare Company writes of the Fool:

There is no contemporary parallel for the role of Fool in the court of kings. As Shakespeare conceives it, the Fool is a servant and subject to punishment ('Take heed, sirrah – the whip ' 1:4:104) and yet Lear's relationship with his fool is one of friendship and dependency. The Fool acts as a commentator on events and is one of the characters (Kent being the other) who is fearless in speaking the truth. The Fool provides wit in this bleak play and unlike some of Shakespeare's clowns who seem unfunny to us today because their topical jokes no longer make sense, the Fool in King Lear ridicules Lear's actions and situation in such a way that audiences understand the point of his jokes. His 'mental eye' is the most acute in the beginning of the play: he sees Lear's daughters for what they are and has the foresight to see that Lear's decision will prove disastrous.

Writes Jan Kott, in Shakespeare Our Contemporary,

The Fool does not follow any ideology. He rejects all appearances, of law, justice, moral order. He sees brute force, cruelty and lust. He has no illusions and does not seek consolation in the existence of natural or supernatural order, which provides for the punishment of evil and the reward of good. Lear, insisting on his fictitious majesty, seems ridiculous to him. All the more ridiculous because he does not see how ridiculous he is. But the Fool does not desert his ridiculous, degraded king, and accompanies him on his way to madness. The Fool knows that the only true madness is to recognize this world as rational.

- The Gravediggers in Hamlet
- The Porter in Macbeth
- Thersites in Troilus and Cressida
- Touchstone in As You Like It – Touchstone is a domestic fool belonging to the duke's brother Frederick. He is a wise fool, although Rosalind and Celia jokingly say he is a natural fool ("Fortune makes Nature's natural the cutter-off of Nature's wit", "hath sent this natural for our whetstone"). Accordingly, he is often threatened with a whip, a method of punishment often used on people of this category.
- Trinculo in The Tempest – Trinculo is considered to be a jester, but as he is only seen with Stephano and Caliban, he does not have the stage time to act out the qualifications of a traditional fool. At the end of the play, however, it is revealed that he works for both Stephano and the King of Naples. He is a domestic buffoon, and is outfitted accordingly.
- Yorick in Hamlet - The deceased "fellow of infinite jest" who inspires one of Prince Hamlet's soliloquies.

== Costumes ==
“Motley's the only wear.”

— Shakespeare, As You Like It, ii. 7.

The costumes worn by Shakespearean fools were fairly standardized at the Globe Theatre. Actors wore a ragged or patchwork coat. Often, bells hung along the skirt and on the elbows. They wore closed breeches with tights, with each leg a different colour. A monk-like hood covering the entire head was positioned as a cape, covering the shoulders and part of the chest. This hood was decorated with animal body parts, such as donkey's ears or the neck and head of a rooster. The animal theme was continued in the crest, which was worn as well.

Actors usually had props. They carried a short stick decorated with the doll head of a fool or puppet on the end.This was an official bauble or scepter, which had a pouch filled with air, sand, or peas attached as well. They wore a long petticoat of different colours, made of expensive materials such as velvet trimmed with yellow.

== See also ==
- Carnivalesque
- List of jesters
- Wise fool
