= Joan d'Acosta =

Jewish jester (c. 1665 – c.1740)

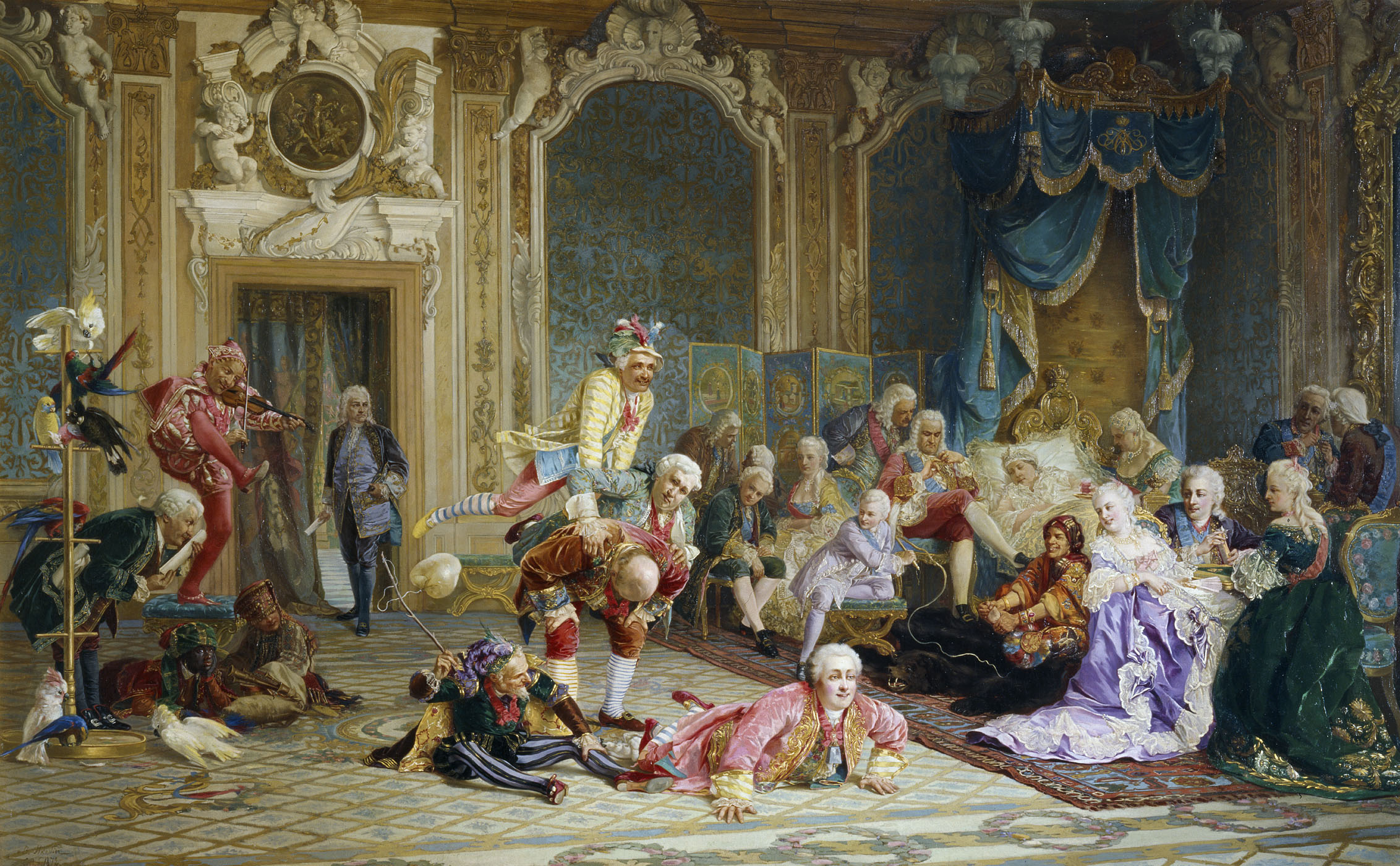
- Jesters at the Court of Empress Anna (1872) by Valery Jacobi. D'Acosta appears at the bottom of the painting, wielding a whip.
- Born: c. 1665
- Died: c. 1740
- Occupation: Court jester

Joan d'Acosta (Russian: Ян Лакоста, romanized: Yan Lakosta; c. 1665 – c. 1740) was a Jewish jester at the court of Tsar Peter I of Russia in the first half of the eighteenth century.

== Biography ==
Born in Holland or Morocco into a Portuguese Marrano family, d'Acosta worked as a broker in Hamburg before settling in Saint Petersburg. He received an appointment as jester in 1714.

D'Acosta is described as having been very clever and witty, well-versed in Scripture, and a master of numerous European languages. Tsar Peter reportedly enjoyed discussing philosophical and theological questions with him, which often led to heated arguments. As a reward for his services, the tsar gave him the uninhabited island of Sammer in the Gulf of Finland, along with the mock title "King of the Samoyeds". He retained his position as court jester under Empress Anne.

== Legacy ==
D'Acosta appears as a protagonist in David Markish's 1983 novel Jesters.
