= Jean Châtel =

French assassin (1575–1594)

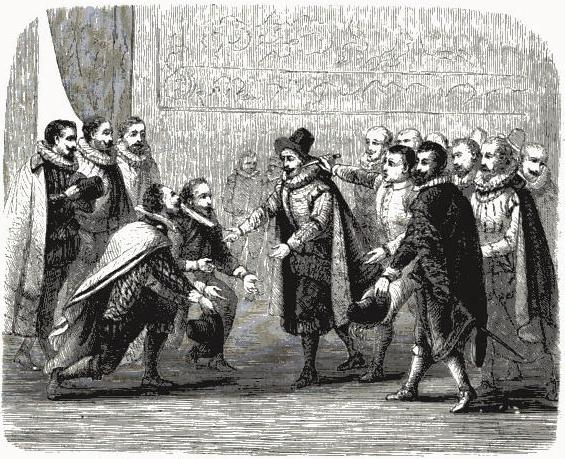

Jean Châtel (1575 – 29 December 1594) attempted to assassinate King Henry IV of France on 27 December 1594. He was the son of a cloth merchant and was aged 19 when he was executed on 29 December.

On 27 December 1594, Châtel managed to gain entry to the King's chamber. When Henry stooped to help two officials rise who had knelt before him, Châtel attacked him with a knife, striking his lip. He was at once arrested (prevented from leaving the room by the court jester Mathurine de Vallois) and condemned for the crime of lèse majesté. As the law prescribed, first Châtel's hand, with which he had struck the King, was burned with molten sulfur, lead and wax. He was then executed by dismemberment.

Under questioning, Châtel revealed that he had been educated by the Jesuits of the Collège de Clermont (now the Lycée Louis-le-Grand). In the atmosphere of the day, with the Wars of Religion still in progress, it was inevitable that the Jesuits would be accused of inspiring Châtel's attack. His former teachers, Fathers Hay and Guéret, were fortunate to be exiled; a third teacher, Father Guignard, was hanged and burned at the stake for his presumed part in the affair. The Collège de Clermont was closed, and the building was confiscated. The Jesuit Order was banned in France, although this ban was quickly lifted.
