= Jean Le Fèvre de Saint-Remy =

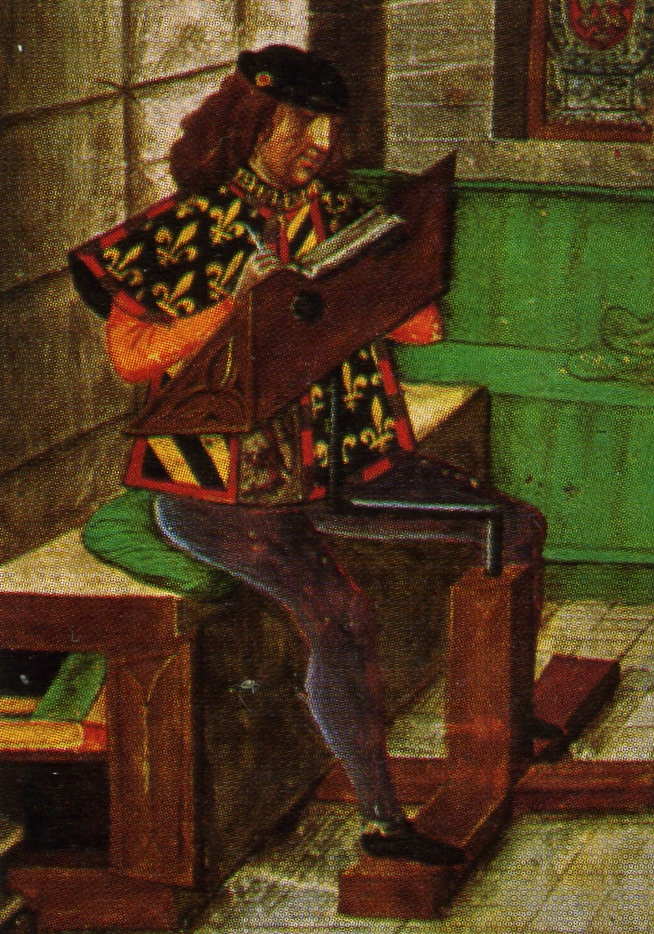
- Depiction of Jean le Fèvre de Saint-Remy as Toison d'Or King of Arms, dated c. 1450
- Born: c.1394 Abbeville
- Died: 16 June 1468
- Occupation: chronicler

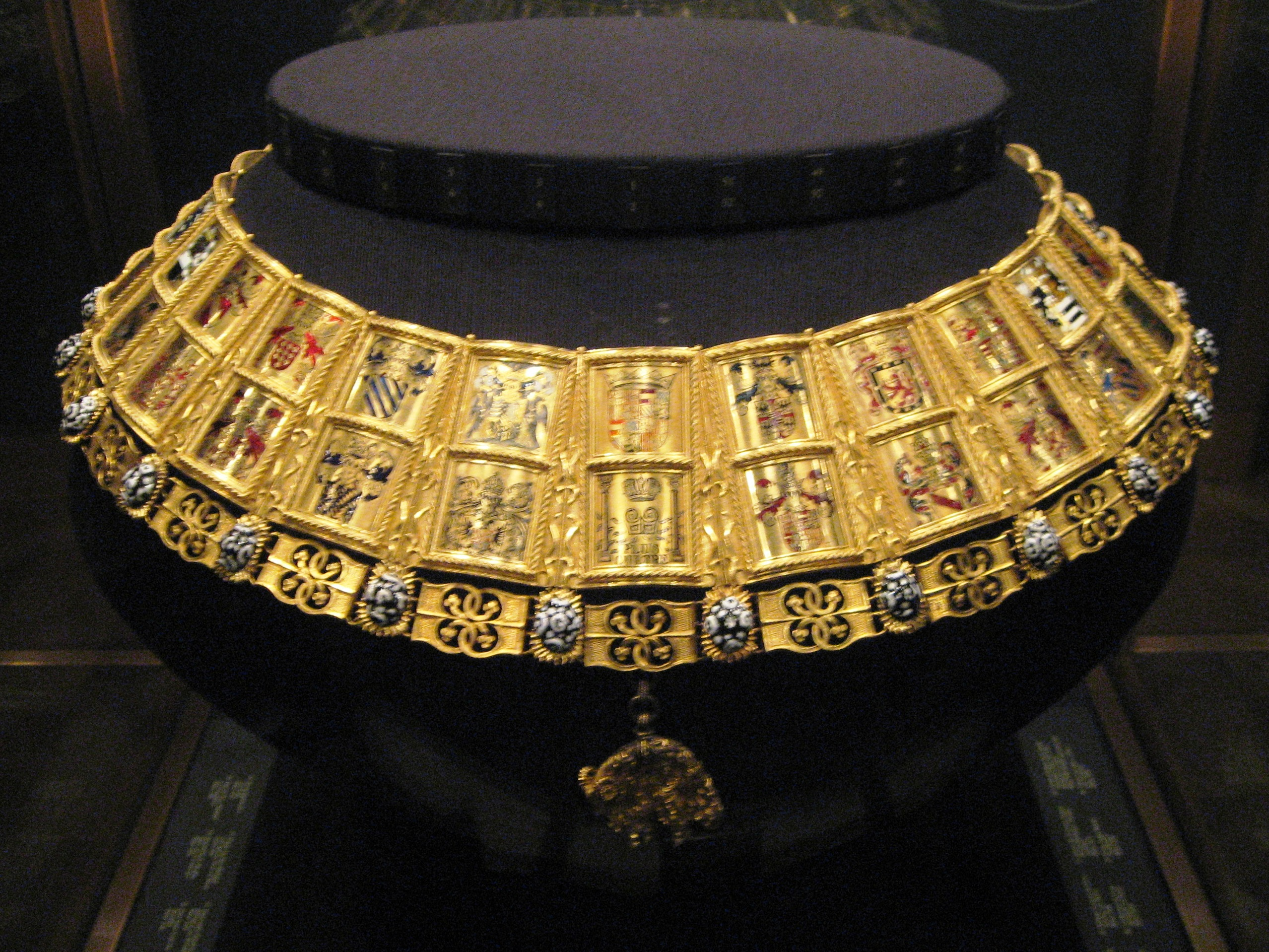
Potence or Neck Collar worn by the King of Arms to the Order of the Golden Fleece

Jean le Fèvre de Saint-Remy or Jean Lefebvre de Saint-Remy (c. 1394 – 16 June 1468) born in Abbeville, was a Burgundian chronicler during the Hundred Years' War and lord (seigneur) of Saint Remy, la Vacquerie, Avesnes and Morienne. He is also known by the formal title of authority Toison d'or (Golden Fleece) because he served as the King of Arms to the Order of the Golden Fleece.

== Biography ==
Of noble birth, he adopted the profession of arms and with other Burgundians fought in the English ranks at the Battle of Agincourt. Following the foundation of the Order of the Golden Fleece in 1430 by Philip the Good, Duke of Burgundy, at the Order's chapter meeting in Lille (November 1431) Le Fèvre was appointed its king of arms and he soon became a very influential person at the Burgundian court. As counsellor to the duke of Burgundy, he frequently assisted Philip III in conducting negotiations with foreign powers, and he was an arbiter in tournaments and authority on all questions of chivalry, where his wide expert knowledge of heraldry was highly respected. Recognition of distinction for his services in the form adoubement and knighthood ensued late in Le Fèvre's life: the medieval chronicler Georges Chastellain describes a moving scene at the occasion of the Order's chapter meeting in Bruges in May 1468, where the King of Arms Le Fèvre retired from service on the grounds of old age. Shortly after the Order's tribute in his honour, Le Fèvre died at Bruges of natural causes on 16 June 1468.

Le Fèvre also wrote a chronicle or history of Charles VI of France. The greater part of this chronicle is a resumption of the work of Enguerrand de Monstrelet, but Le Fèvre is an original authority for the years between 1428 and 1436 and makes some valuable additions to our knowledge, especially about the chivalry of the Burgundian court. He is more concise than Monstrelet, but is equally partial to the dukes of Burgundy. The chronicle has been edited by F. Morand for the Société de l'histoire de France (Paris, 1876): Chronique de Jean le Fèvre Seigneur de Saint Rémy. Le Fèvre is usually regarded as the author of Livre des Faits de Jacques Lalaing, a chronicle biography on the events of the Burgundian knight Jacques de Lalaing.
