= Mathurine de Vallois =

French jester

Mathurine de Vallois, also known as Mathurine la Folle ('Mathurine the Fool') (fl. 1589 – fl. 1627), was a French jester. She was the jester of the court of French kings Henry III, Henry IV and Louis XIII, successively.

== Life and career ==
Mathurine is noted in the registers of the court with the position Plaisante, which was the title of female jesters of the court in 16th-century France, of which there were evidently several, such as Mademoiselle Sevin, the jester of the queen of Navarre. Mathurine de Vallois is the most known of these female jesters. She was an employee of the court as a whole rather than of a particular person. She is first noted at the court of Henry III. After his death, she was transferred to the employ of his successor Henry IV.

She was known for her extravagant costume as an Amazonian warrior, complete with shield, armor, and a wooden sword. She was famous for her sharp wit, and there were many anecdotes about it. One of them was an occasion in which a lady in waiting complained that she did not like having a fool at her right side, upon which Mathurine jumped to the lady's other side and announced: "I don’t mind it at all."

In Les Essais de Mathurine, she revealed her activism and wit.

Mathurine was a fervent Roman Catholic, and was said to employ her comical talent and wit to convert Huguenots back to Catholicism. She is mentioned along with the jesters Maitre Guillaume and Angoulevent, by a contemporary author who joked that these jesters were Catholic only because they knew that Protestant Reformers would abolish the jester-profession if they came to power.

She was present in 1594 when Henry IV was wounded by the assassin Jean Châtel, and arrested him herself:

Mathurine it was who arrested the youth who attempted to assassinate Henri IV, on the 28th of December. This youth, who had glided into the apartment unperceived, struck at the King with his dagger. "Devil take that fool with her tricks," cried his Majesty… Mathurine sprang to the door, and barring the passage, prevented the escape of the King’s assailant.

Despite this the king, well aware of her Catholic sympathies, had her arrested as a suspected accomplice. She was however able to prove her innocence and was welcomed back to her position at court.

Mathurine is noted for the last time in the court of Louis XIII in 1627.
