= Richard Pace (disambiguation) =

Richard Pace (c. 1482–1536) was an English diplomat.

Richard Pace may also refer to:

- Richard Pace (planter) (before 1590 – c. 1625), English early settler of Jamestown, Virginia
- Richard Pace (architect) (c. 1760–1838), English builder and architect
- Richard Pace (The Tudors), a fictional character in The Tudors loosely based on the diplomat
- Richard Pace, a character in The Misfits

== See also ==
- Richard Paez, judge
