= John Pace =

John Pace (c.1523 – c.1590) was a jester to Duke of Norfolk, and later at the court of Elizabeth I.

== Life ==
Pace was probably a nephew of English diplomat Richard Pace. He was educated at Eton College, and in 1539 was elected a scholar of King's College, Cambridge. He apparently left the university before he finished his studies, although he was popularly credited with being a Master of Arts.

He may have been jester to Henry VIII, although this is doubted. It is probable that he became jester in the household of the Duke of Norfolk before Henry VIII's death; in Elizabeth's reign he was transferred to the court. That a man of education like Pace should have voluntarily assumed "the fool's coat" often excited hostile comment. To such criticism Pace's friend, John Heywood, the epigrammatist, once answered that it was better for the common weal for wise men to "go in fools' coats" than for fools to "go in wise men's gowns".

Thomas Nash authored epistles honouring Pace.

Pace died some time before 1592.

== His wit ==
Two examples of Pace's wit survive. Cardinal Allen relates in his An Apology for the English Seminaries (1581) that when the English government interdicted the circulation of Catholic books in England, ‘madde J. Pace, meeting one day with M. Juel [i.e. John Jewel, bishop of Salisbury], saluted his lordship courtly, and said, "Now, my Lord, you may be at rest with these felowes, for you are quit by proclamation."' Francis Bacon relates in his Apothegms New and Old (1625) that 'Pace the bitter fool was not suffered to come at the Queen because of his bitter humour. Yet at one time some persuaded the Queen that he should come to her; undertaking for him that he should keep compass. So he was brought to her, and the Queen said: "Come on, Pace; now we shall hear of our faults.” Saith Pace: "I do not use to talk of that that all the town talks of."'
