= Fausto Melotti =

Italian sculptor

Fausto Melotti (1901–1986) was an Italian sculptor, ceramicist, poet, and theorist.

== Life ==
Fausto Melotti was born in the city of Rovereto, a city just east of Lake Garda in northeastern Italy in 1901. He had a sister, Renata Melotti, who was also an artist―Renata married the architect Gino Pollini. During the First World War, his family fled intense fighting in the Alpine region and moved to Florence. Melotti was married and had two daughters; one, Marta Melotti started the foundation dedicated to her father's work.

Melotti died at his home on Corso Magenta in Milan on 22 June 1986.

== Education ==
In Florence, Melotti enrolled in the Istituto Tecnico di Firenze and then the Università di Pisa where he studied physics and mathematics. Moving to Milan the following year, he enrolled in the Reale Istituto Tecnico Superiore and then continued his studies at the Politecnico di Milano at the School of Applied Industrial Engineering. After some time back in Rovereto, Melotti returned to Milan, finishing his degree at the Politecnico in 1924. After this, Melotti enrolled at the Accademia di Brera in Milan, working alongside Lucio Fontana under the tutelage of sculptor Adolfo Wildt.

== Artistic career ==
Between 1919 and 1922, Melotti frequently returned to Rovereto where he became active in the Futurist movement. Working with his cousin and art theorist Carlo Belli (1903–1991), his brother-in-law architect Gino Pollini, and Futurist painter, playwright and designer Fotrunato Depero, Melotti contributed to work created at the latter's "Casa d'Arte Futurista". Melotti returned to Milan; there he was associated with the young architecture collaborative in Milan, "Gruppo 7"—Pollini, Luigi Figini (1903–1984), Giuseppe Terragni, Carlo Enrico Rava (1903–1985), Guido Frette (1901–1984), Sebatiano Larco (1870–1959), and Ubaldo Castagnoli (1882 – after 1926). Melotti's friendship with Fontana grew, and he even was living with him for a time in Milan.

Throughout the 1930s, Melotti continued to collaborate with a number of important architects and their firms: Pollini, Gruppo 7, and others like Gio Ponti and BBPR. At this time, Melotti created his most iconic series, a set of purely abstract sculptures, which he exhibited at the progressive Milanese abstractionist gallery Il Milione, in 1935. In the accompanying catalogue to the exhibition, Melotti outlined his ideas about abstraction.

In 1938, Melotti received his first major Fascist commission to create maquettes sculpture for the E 42 (Esposizione universale di Roma 1942 or Universal Exposition of 1942) project. From this, he won a contract for two series of full-sized sculptures in 1941; when moved to Rome to work on the final marbles—only one set of which would be completed. In 1943, he returned to Milan to find his studio destroyed by British bombers.

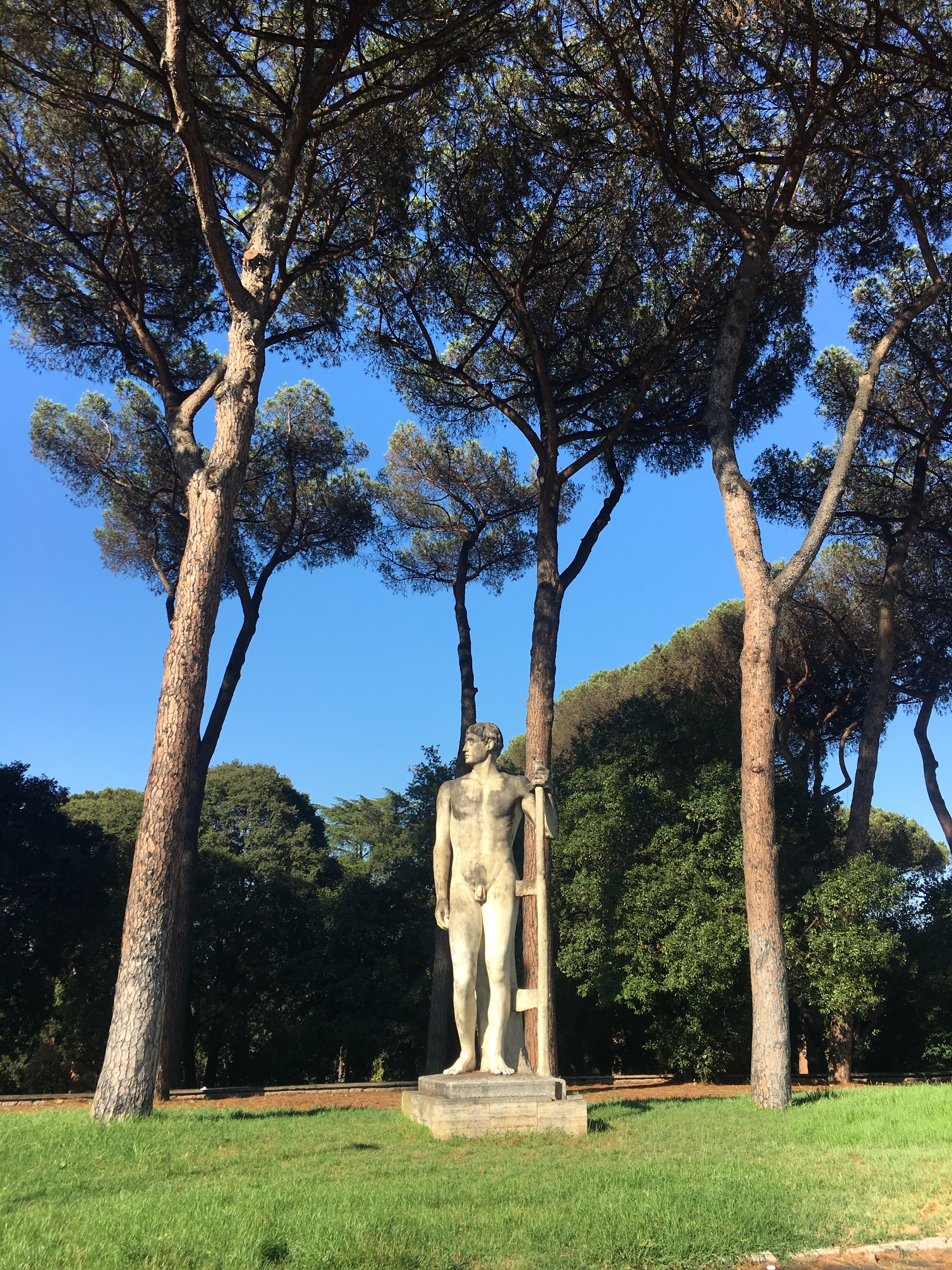
Fausto Melotti, Si redimono i campi [The fields are liberated], 1943 (variant no. 4, detail of marble, 520cm). Located at the EUR in Rome, Italy.

Throughout the 1940s and 50s, Melotti worked almost exclusively in ceramics and terracotta, and continued to participate in exhibitions at the new post-war Milan Triennale. Then in 1961, Melotti returned to his earlier imagery with his work I Sette savi. This work marked another shift in the sculptors' oeuvre. During the rest of his career, Melotti continued to create works in ceramic, while beginning a new set of works constructed from pieces of metal. These works return to a more abstract form, yet with some Kandinskian figurative traces. Through the 1970s and '80s, his work was much acclaimed and he won a number of national and international prizes for sculpture, culminating in a major retrospective at the Forte Belvedere in Florence in 1981.
