= Italian design =

Forms of design in Italy

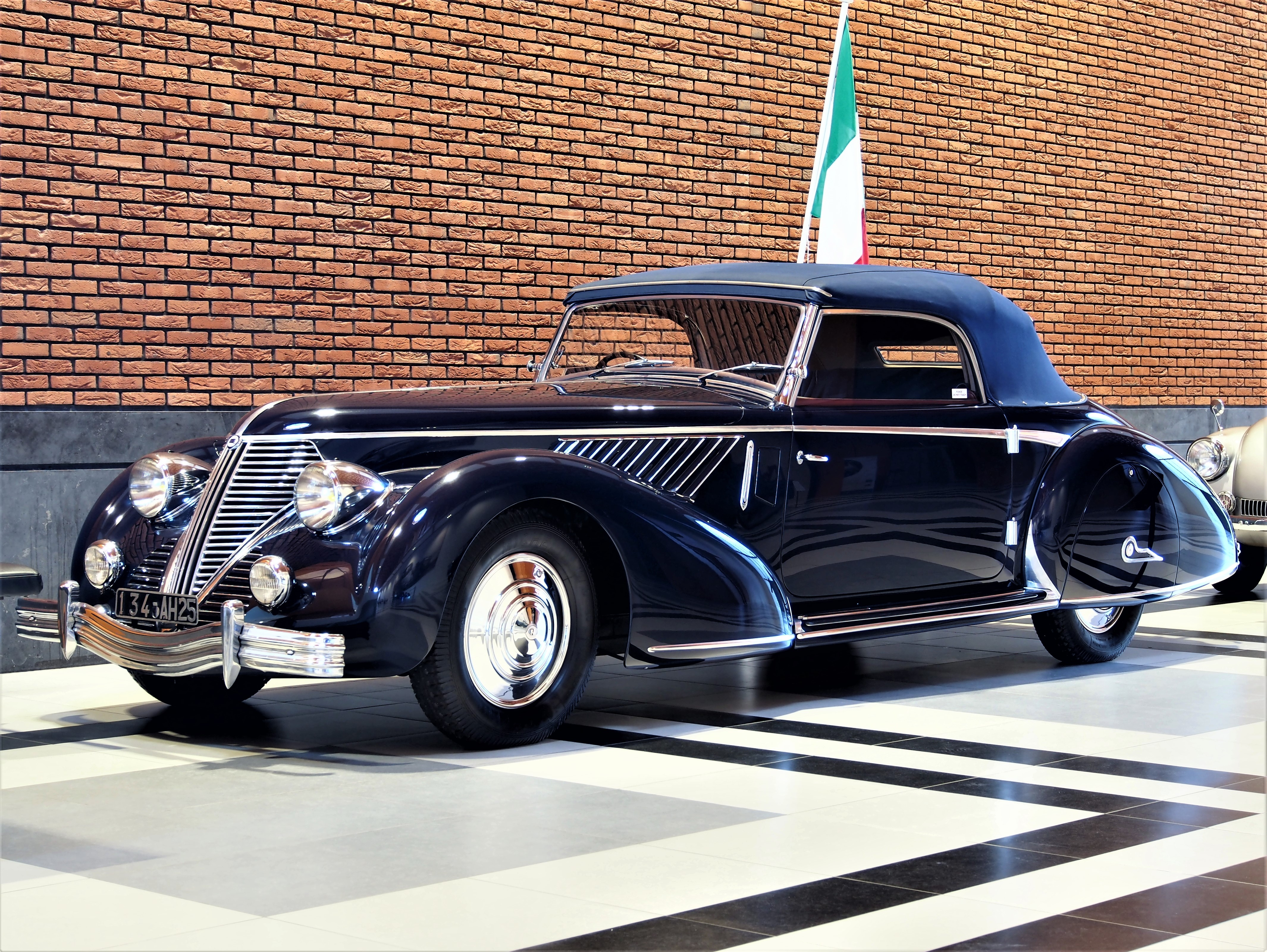
Lancia Astura, designed by Pinin Farina, 1938

Italian design refers to all forms of design in Italy, including interior design, urban design, fashion design, and architectural design. Italy is recognized as a worldwide trendsetter and leader in design. The architect Luigi Caccia Dominioni claimed, "Quite simply, we are the best. We have more imagination, more culture, and are better mediators between the past and the future". Italy today still exerts a vast influence on urban design, industrial design, interior design, and fashion design worldwide.

Generally, the term "design" is associated with the age of the Industrial Revolution, which arrived in Italy during the pre-unification in the Kingdom of the Two Sicilies. In the context of Italian design, it is about Italian-born design and development in various fields such as silks San Leucio and workshops Pietrarsa, shipyards of Castellammare di Stabia. The rest of Italy was characterized by fragmented political and geographical condition but industrialization was significantly present in other pre-unitary States like Grand Duchy of Tuscany and Sardinia-Piedmont. After the Unification of Italy, despite the slow consolidation of the cotton industry and factories, the country's industrialization was seldom discussed prior to 1870–80.

== Interior design ==
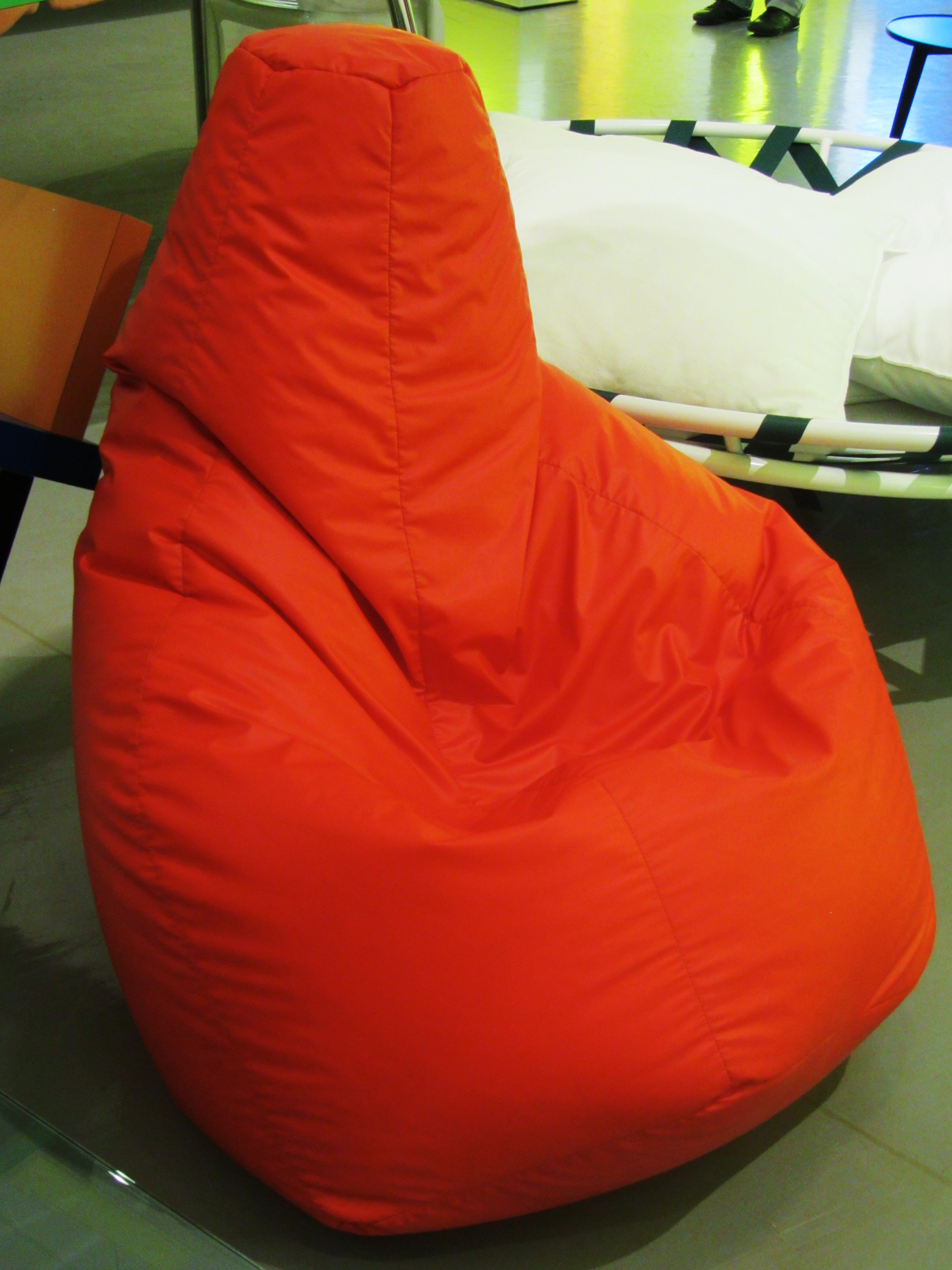
Sacco | Piero Gatti, Cesare Paolini, Franco Teodoro [1968]. Sacco is part of the permanent collection of 27 museums of modern art worldwide. Sacco was awarded the Compasso d'Oro in 2020.

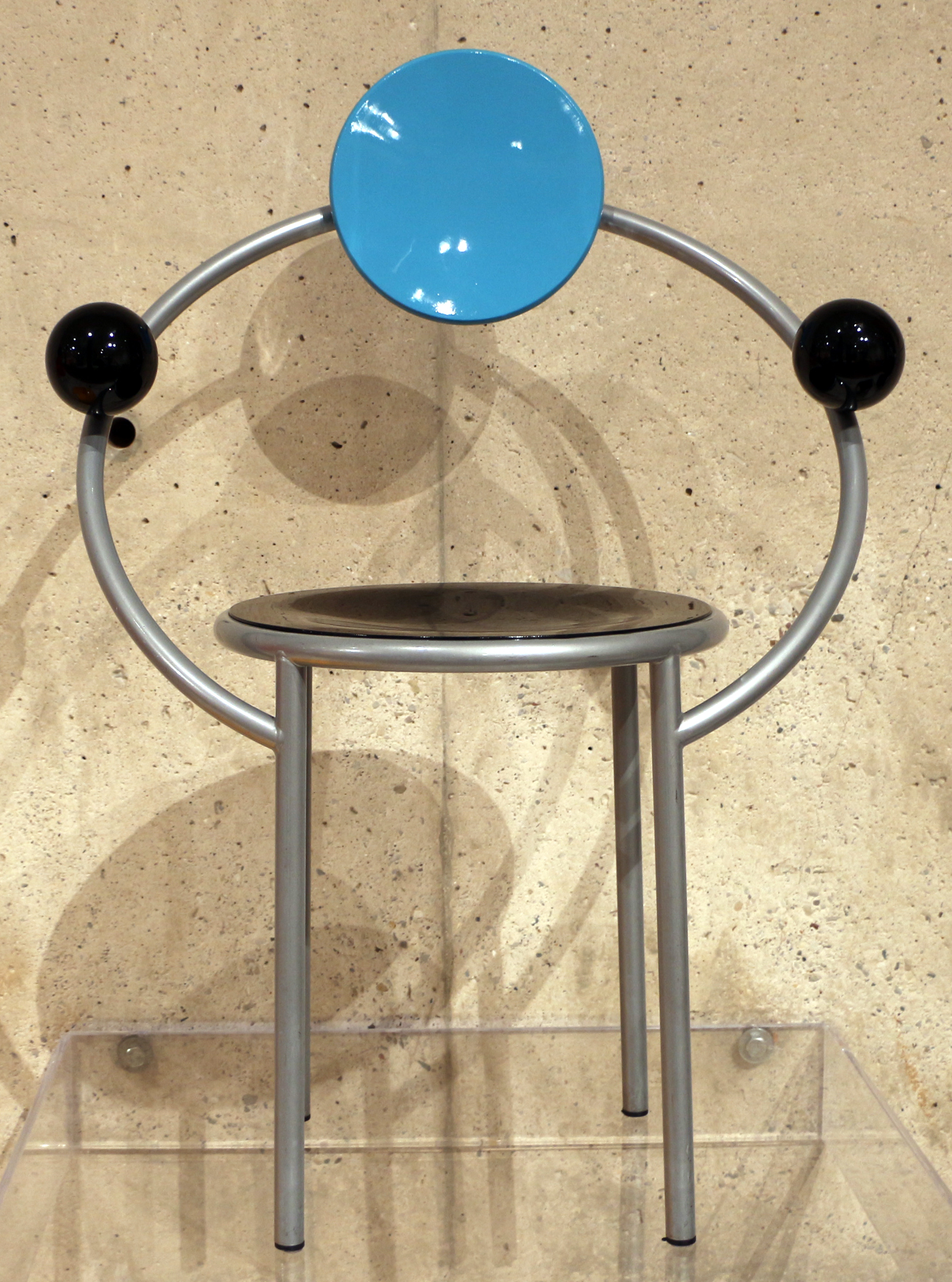
A chair by designer Michele de Lucchi, made in 1983

Italy has produced some of the greatest furniture designers in the world, such as Achille Castiglioni, Gio Ponti, and Ettore Sottsass. Italian interior design in the 1900s was particularly well-known and grew to the heights of class and sophistication. At first, in the early 1900s, Italian furniture designers struggled to create an equal balance between classical elegance and modern creativity, and initially, Italian interior design in the 1910s and 1920s was very similar to that of French art deco styles, using exotic materials and creating sumptuous furniture. However, Italian art deco reached its pinnacle under Gio Ponti, who made his designs sophisticated, elegant, stylish, refined, modern, exotic and creative. In 1926, a new style of furnishing emerged in Italy, known as "Razionalismo", or "Rationalism". The most successful and famous of the Rationalists were the Gruppo 7, led by Luigi Figini, Gino Pollini and Giuseppe Terragni. Their styles used tubular steel and were known as being more plain and simple, and almost Fascist in style after c. 1934. After World War II, however, was the period in which Italy had a true avant-garde in interior design. With the fall of Fascism, birth of Republic and the 1946 RIMA exhibition, Italian talents in interior decorating were made evident. With the Italian economic miracle, Italy saw a growth in industrial production and mass-made furniture. Yet, the 1960s and 1970s saw Italian interior design reach its pinnacle of stylishness. By that point, with Pop and post-modern interiors, the phrases "Bel Design" and "Linea Italiana" entered the vocabulary of furniture design. In 1972 Museum of Modern Art (MoMA) showcased successful Italian design in the exhibition The New Domestic Landscape.

Since the late 1970s and early 1980s, the addition of logos increased by notable Italian fashion houses, such as Prada, Versace, Armani, Gucci and Moschino. Examples of classic pieces of Italian furniture include Sacco, by Piero Gatti, Cesare Paolini, Franco Teodoro, Zanussi's rigorous, creative and streamlined washing machines and fridges, the "New Tone" sofas by Atrium, and most famously the innovative post-modern bookcase, made by Ettore Sottsass for the Memphis Group in 1981, inspired by Bob Dylan's song "Stuck Inside of Mobile with the Memphis Blues Again". The bookcase became a huge cultural icon and design event of the 1980s. Many interior designers use Italian or Italian-inspired pieces.

== Industrial design ==
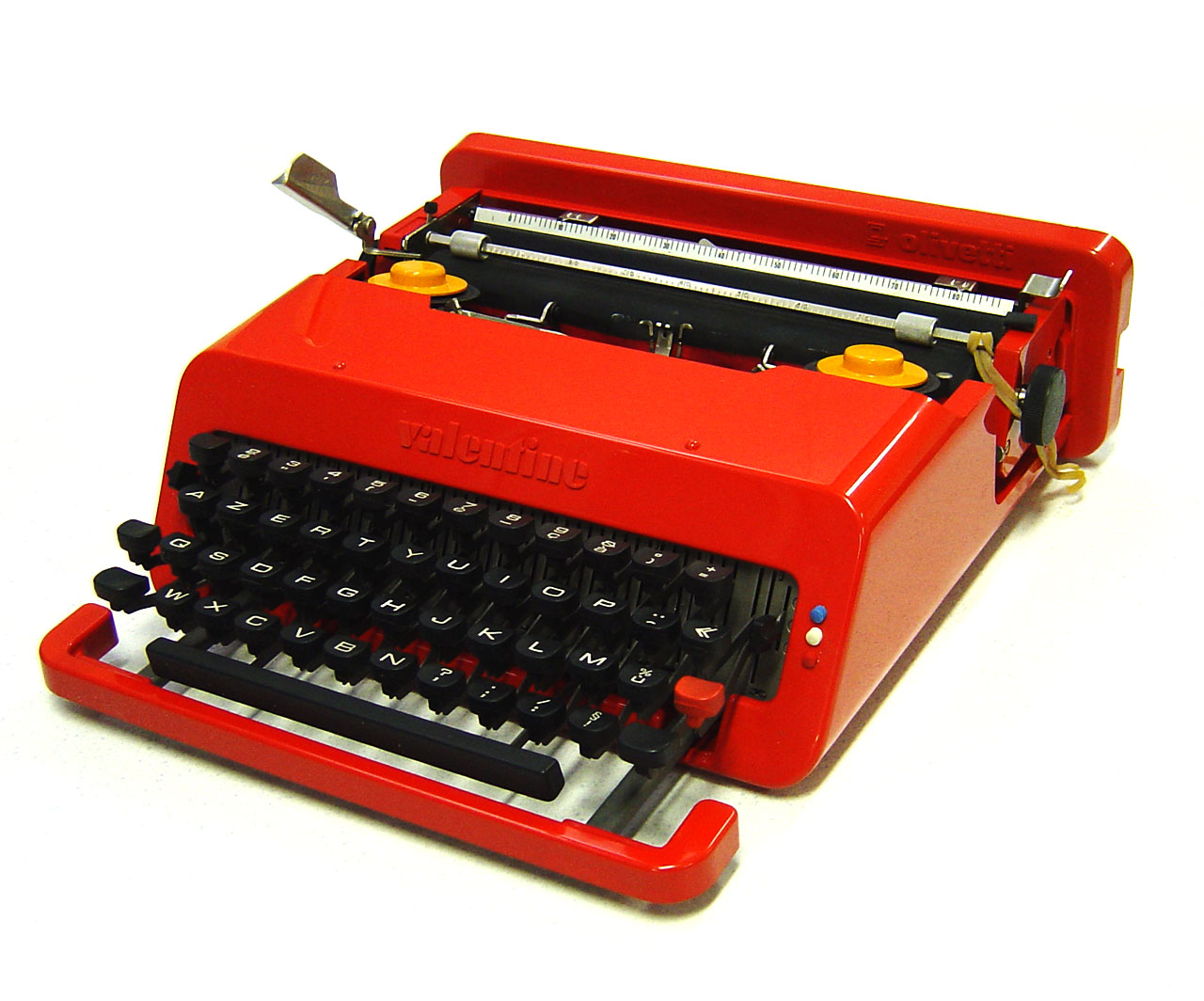
The Olivetti Valentine designed by Ettore Sottsass with Perry A. King and Albert Leclerc

In addition to furniture design, Italy has also set trends for industrial design with the prototype of the light Luminator Bernocchi in 1928. The Moka pot, designed by Alfonso Bialetti, was a ground-breaking design upon its release in 1933, and it continues to be manufactured to this day with few modifications. Olivetti is notable for its office and electronic equipment designs, through collaborations with notable architects and designers, over a nearly 60-year period starting in the late 1930s.

== Automobile design ==
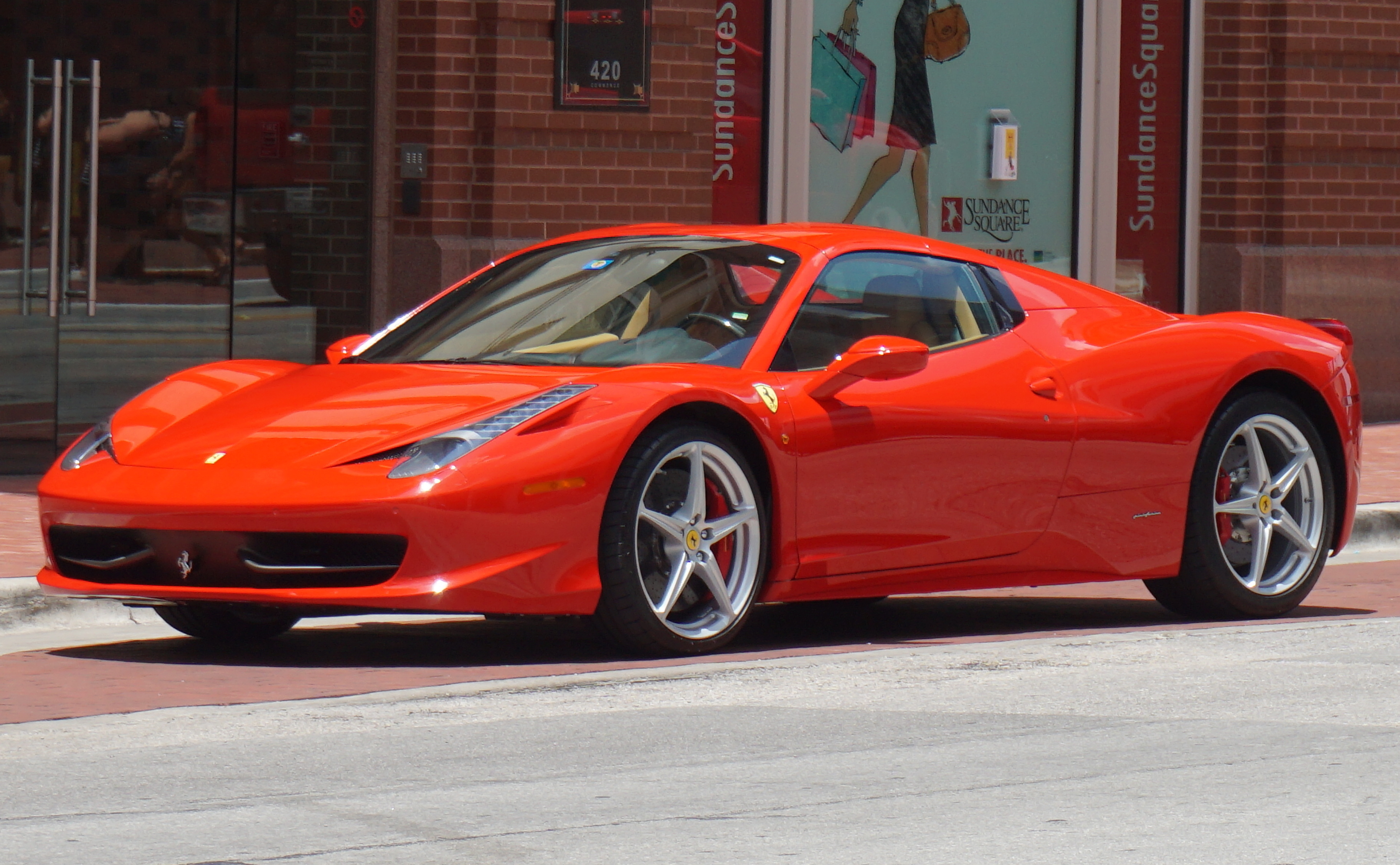
A Ferrari 458. Ferraris are amongst Italy's most iconic supercars.

Italy is also very influential in car design, and has produced some of the greatest status symbols of the century. The automobile industry in the nation is a large employer in the country, with a labour force of over 196,000 (2004) working in the industry. Italy is the fifth largest automobile producer in Europe (2006). Over the ages, Italian cars have been recognized worldwide for their stylishness and practicality. Famous Italian cars include the Alfa Romeo convertibles of the 1950s and the Ferrari Spider and Ferrari Formula supercars. There are also several symbolic vehicle types which are less luxurious and more mass-market than those cars, such as the iconic Fiat Topolino and Fiat 500, and the symbolic Vespa Piaggio, which became one of the most fashionable and affordable vehicles in Italy after World War II, being first produced in 1946. Italy is also home to world-renowned car design firms such as Pininfarina, Zagato, Italdesign, and Bertone.

== Fashion design ==
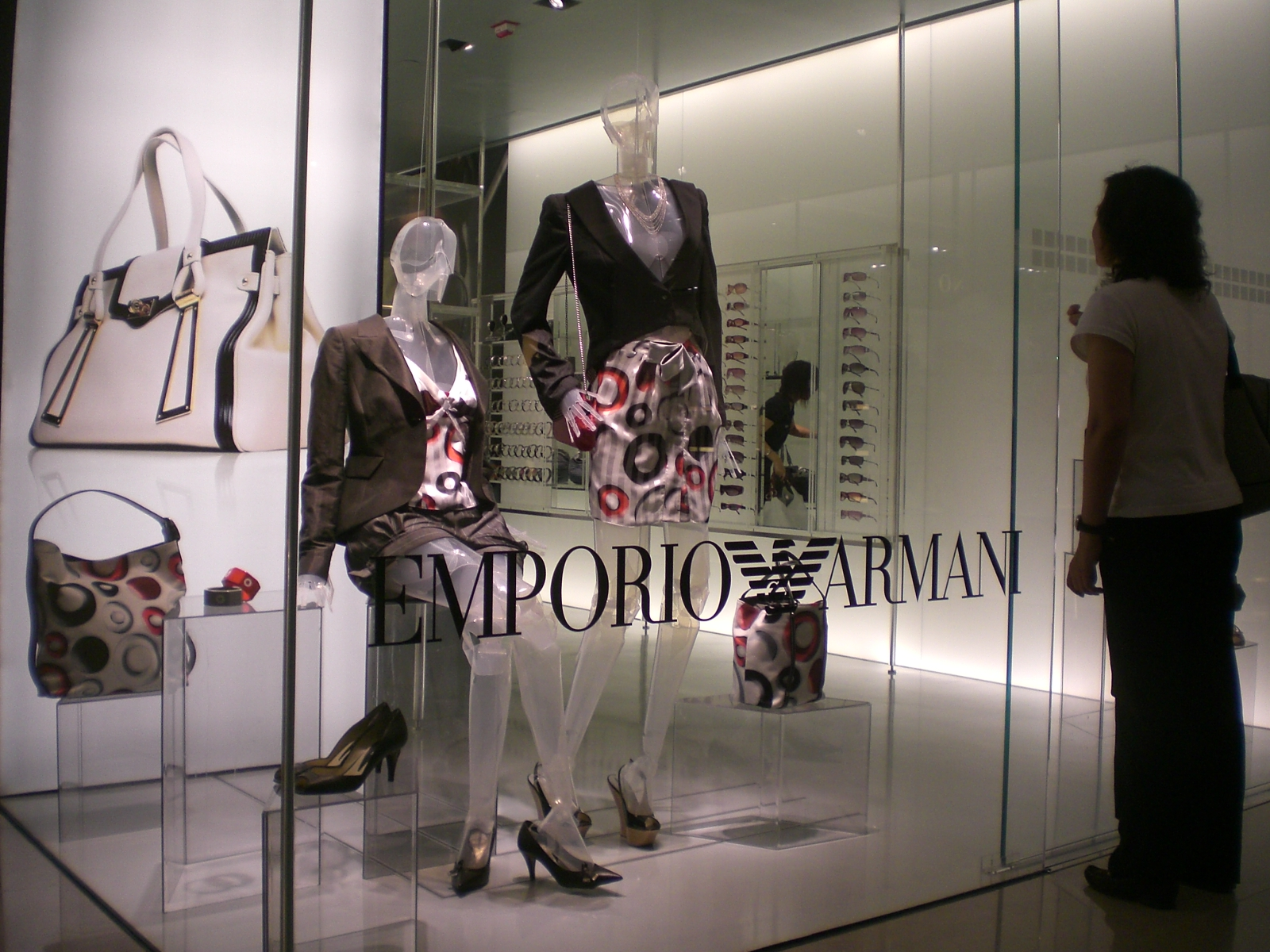
Clothes by Emporio Armani, one of the most luxurious and famous Italian fashion houses

Italian fashion is among the world's most important fashion designs, alongside those of France, Germany, United States, Great Britain and Japan. Fashion has always been an important part of the culture of Italy, and its society. Italian designs began become one of Europe's main trendsetters ever since the 11th–16th centuries, when artistic development in Italy was at its peak. Cities such as Venice, Milan, Florence and Vicenza started to produce luxury goods, hats, cosmetics, jewelry and rich fabrics. Between the 17th and early 20th centuries, Italian fashion lost its importance, and Europe's main trendsetter became France, as French fashion began to become hugely popular, ever since luxury dresses began to be designed for the courtiers of Louis XIV. However, since the 1951–53 fashion soirées held by Giovanni Battista Giorgini in Florence, the "Italian school" started to compete with the French haute couture, as labels such as Ferragamo and Gucci began to contend with Chanel and Dior. Currently, Milan, (Italy's center of design) is considered the true fashion capital of the world, according to the 2009 Global Language Monitor, and Rome ranked 4th. Both these cities annually compete with other major international centers, such as Paris, New York City, London and Tokyo.

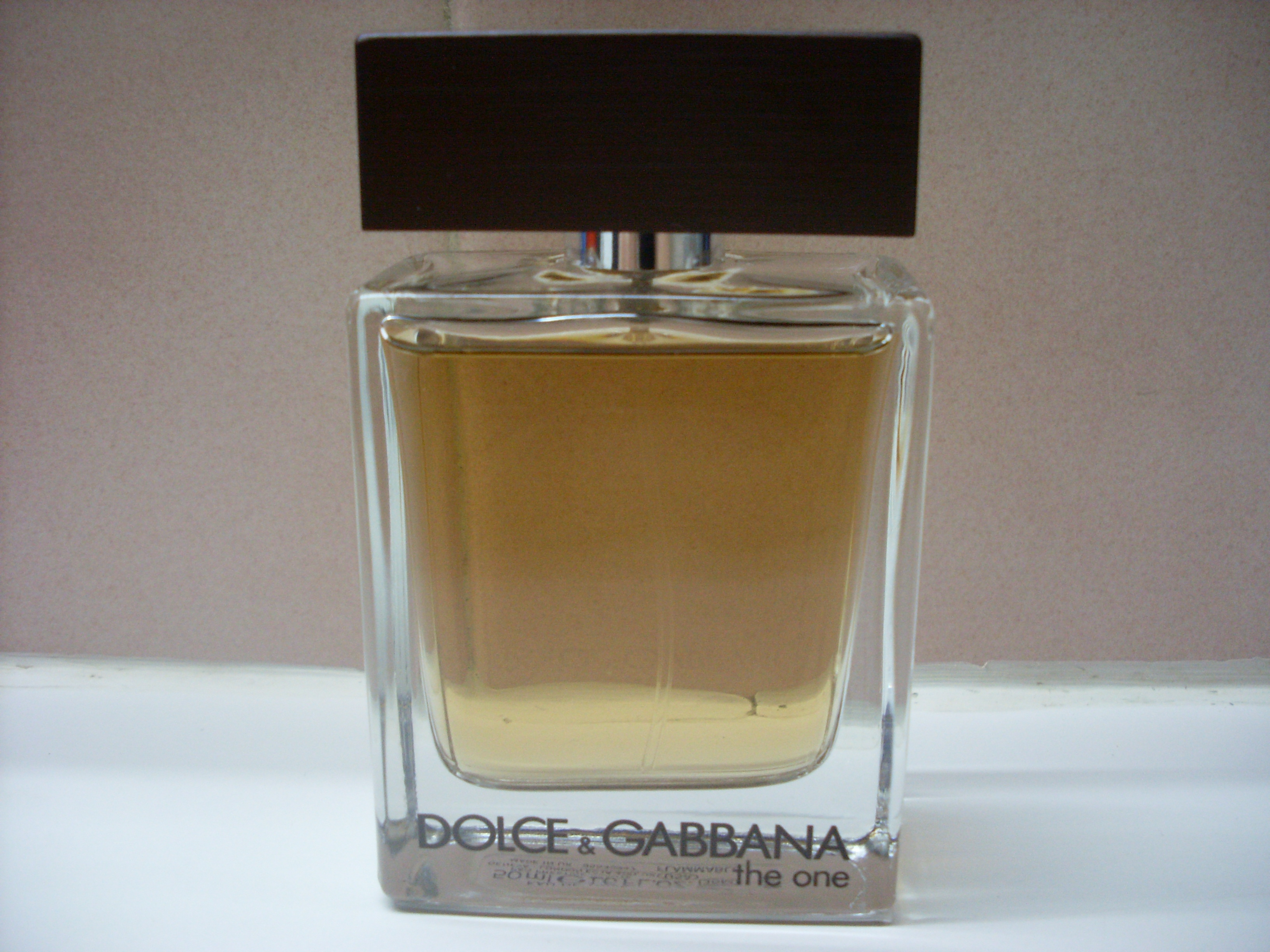
"The One", the fragrance by Dolce & Gabbana

Examples of major Italian fashion houses are: Gucci, Armani, Emilio Pucci, Emporio Armani, Valentino, Prada, Dolce & Gabbana, Ferragamo, Roberto Cavalli, Trussardi, Versace, Krizia, Etro, Miu Miu, Laura Biagiotti, Max Mara, Fendi, Moschino, Missoni, Benetton and Brioni (fashion). Italy also is home to many fashion magazines, such as Grazia, Vogue Italia, Vera, Chi, Gioia and Donna. Other Italian accessory and jewelry brands, such as Bulgari, are valued highly by consumers. Armani is well known for its minimalism and sophisticated style, Versace for its extravagant and ultra-luxurious lines, Gucci for its symbolic chicness and style, Prada for its glitz and glamour, Valentino for its supreme elegance, Dolce & Gabbana for its fantasious and outrageous dresses, Romeo Gigli for its romantic and creative ideas and Moschino for its smart/casual outfits and t-shirts.

== Bibliography ==
- Northern Italy (Insight Guides). APA Publications. 2004. ISBN 981-234-903-0.
- Miller, Judith (2005). Furniture: world styles from classical to contemporary. DK Publishing. ISBN 0-7566-1340-X.
