= Ubaldo Castagnoli =

Italian architect and engineer (1902–1982)

- Born: 7 May 1902; Rome, Kingdom of Italy
- Died: 29 November 1982 (aged 80); Turin, Italy
- Education: Polytechnic University of Milan
- Occupations: Architect, engineer

Ubaldo Castagnoli (7 May 1902 – 29 November 1982) was an Italian architect and engineer.

== Life and career ==
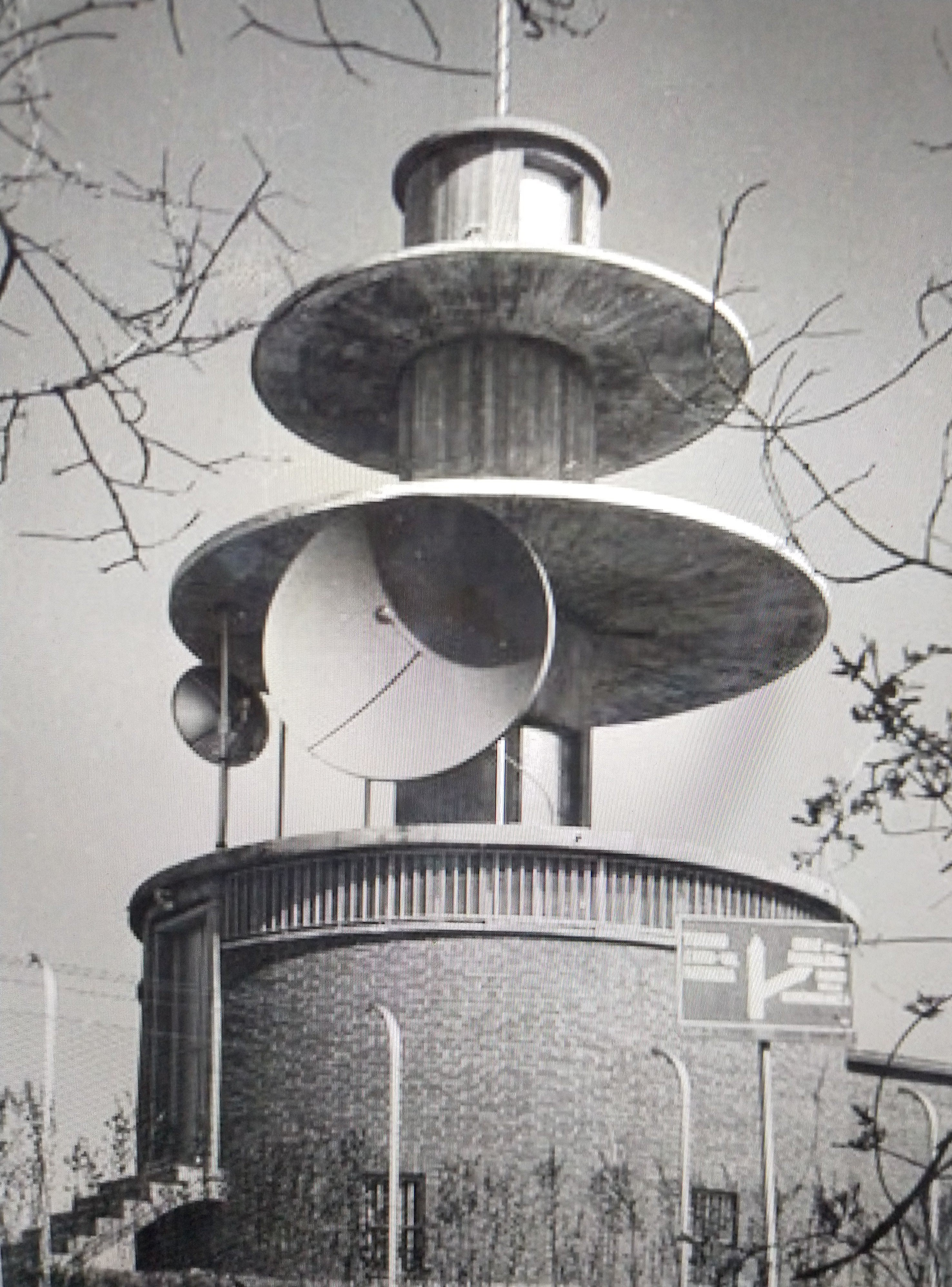
The STIPEL Tower in Turin

In 1926, alongside Luigi Figini, Guido Frette, Sebastiano Larco, Gino Pollini, Carlo Enrico Rava, and Giuseppe Terragni, Castagnoli co-founded Gruppo 7, a key initiator of Italian Rationalism. He left the group in 1927 due to professional obligations and was replaced by Adalberto Libera.

In the following years, Castagnoli gained recognition through projects for competitions and exhibitions (notably the 5th Milan Triennial and the Pirelli pavilion) and collaborated with Piero Bottoni and Antonio Cassi Ramelli. Between 1931 and 1932, he published a series of technical articles in Rassegna di Architettura, focusing on innovative building materials.

In 1935, he joined the Società Telefonica Interregionale Piemontese e Lombarda (STIPEL), where he worked for over 25 years as director of real estate affairs, overseeing the planning and construction of offices, telephone buildings, switching stations, and air-raid shelters across Lombardy, Piedmont, and the Aosta Valley. Notable projects include the radio relay tower on Colle della Maddalena and the telephone headquarters on Via Confienza in Turin.

In 1946 and 1948, he was commissioned by president Luigi Einaudi to restore his residences in Turin and Dogliani; their correspondence is preserved in the Einaudi archives.

== Sources ==
- Ciucci, Giorgio; Muratore, Giorgio (2004). Storia dell'architettura italiana. Il primo Novecento. Milan: Electa.
- Incerti, Manuela; Mei, Gianmarco; Castagnoli, Anna (2022). "Ubaldo Castagnoli: sulle tracce grafiche e storiche di un esponente del Gruppo 7". Diségno. No. 10. pp. 135–146.
- Velo, Uliva; Castagnoli, Anna; Incerti, Manuela (2020). "Ubaldo Castagnoli. From Gruppo 7 to architectures for telecommunications". In Arena, A. (ed.). Connecting. Drawing for weaving relationships. Proceeding of the 42th Inter-national Conference of Representation Disciplines Teachers. Milan: FrancoAngeli. pp. 2869–2890.
- Incerti, Manuela; Mei, Gianmarco (2021). "Ubaldo Castagnoli and the Hanging Swimming Pool of the Palazzo dei Telefoni in Turin". In Arena, A. (ed.). Connecting. FrancAngeli. pp. 2367–2384.
- Gavinelli, Corrado; Loik, Mirella (1993). Architettura del XX secolo. Jaca Book.
- Velo, Uliva; Castagnoli, Anna; Incerti, Manuela (2020). "Ubaldo Castagnoli. From Gruppo 7 to architectures for telecommunications". In Arena, A. (ed.). Connecting. Drawing for weaving relationships. Proceeding of the 42th Inter-national Conference of Representation Disciplines Teachers. Milan: FrancoAngeli. pp. 2869–2890.
