= Carlo Enrico Rava =

Italian architect (1903–1986)

- Born: 30 September 1903; Cernobbio, Province of Como, Kingdom of Italy
- Died: 31 May 1986 (aged 82); Milan, Italy
- Education: Brera Academy
- Occupations: Architect, designer, set decorator

Carlo Enrico Rava (30 September 1903 – 31 May 1986) was an Italian architect, designer and set decorator. He is one of the leading figures of rationalist architecture.

== Life and career ==
Rava was born on 30 September 1903 in Cernobbio, near Como, to Enrica Canevari and Maurizio Rava, a founding member of the Fascio di Roma and later colonial administrator, serving as governor of Somaliland from 1931 to 1935. He completed his classical studies at the Cesare Beccaria high school in Milan in 1921 and enrolled at the Polytechnic University, which he did not complete. He subsequently earned a teaching diploma in drawing from the Brera Academy and later qualified as an architect.

In October 1926, he co-founded Gruppo 7 with Luigi Figini, Gino Pollini, Guido Frette, Sebastiano Larco Silva, Giuseppe Terragni, and Ubaldo Castagnoli—one of the key initiatives of the Modern Movement in Italy and the origins of Italian Rationalism.

At the 1927 Monza Biennial, Rava and Larco Silva presented designs for a magazine headquarters and an office building. Their professional collaboration, begun in 1926, continued until 1940. Their first built project was the Solari building in Santa Margherita Ligure (1927). They also participated in the Stuttgart exhibition of the Deutscher Werkbund (1927) and in the First Exhibition of Rational Architecture (1928), presenting designs for serial housing and a hotel at the archaeological site of Leptis Magna in Tripolitania.

In 1929, Rava left Gruppo 7, along with Larco Silva, due to internal disagreements, and joined RAMI (Raggruppamento Architetti Moderni Italiani) in 1931. He travelled frequently in Tripolitania and developed a strong interest in colonial architecture. He took part in the 1936 National Congress of Italian Architects on Colonial Architecture and curated installations for the Autarchic Exhibition of Italian Minerals (Italian Africa Pavilion, Rome 1938) and the 7th Milan Triennial (Colonial Equipment Exhibition, 1940). He designed several buildings in Suani Ben Adem, Mogadishu, Assab, and Addis Ababa. In 1939, he entered the urban plan competition for Verbania with Giovanni Pellegrini.

During the 1930s, he also became involved in cinema, designing sets for Inventiamo l'amore (1938) by Camillo Mastrocinque and L'argine by Corrado D'Errico. He also contributed articles to Domus, Cinema, Bianco e Nero, and Lo Stile.

After the war, he focused on theatre scenography and worked with various publishers. He edited volumes on set design and interior decoration, and from 1951 served as editor-in-chief of the design magazine Prospettive. He died in Milan on 31 May 1986.

== Sources ==
- Catini, Raffaella (2016). "RAVA, Carlo Enrico". Dizionario Biografico degli Italiani. Vol. 86. Istituto dell'Enciclopedia Italiana.
- Ciucci, Giorgio; Muratore, Giorgio (2004). Storia dell'architettura italiana. Il primo Novecento. Milan: Electa.
- Cresti, Carlo (2005). "Architettura coloniale per i territori italiani d'Oltremare". Architettura e città negli anni del fascismo in Italia e nelle colonie. Florence: Angelo Pontecorboli. pp. 74–76, 81, 84, 92.
- Godoli, Ezio; Giacomelli, Milva (2005). Architetti e ingegneri italiani dal Levante al Magreb (1848-1945). Florence: Maschietto. pp. 297–302.
- Nicoloso, Paolo (1999). Gli architetti di Mussolini. Scuole e sindacato, architetti e massoni, professori e politici negli anni del regime. Milan: FrancoAngeli. pp. 72, 77, 108, 122–125.
- Zevi, Bruno (2001). Storia dell'architettura moderna. Turin: Einaudi. pp. 182–187.
