= Fortunato Depero =

Italian painter and graphic designer (1892–1960)

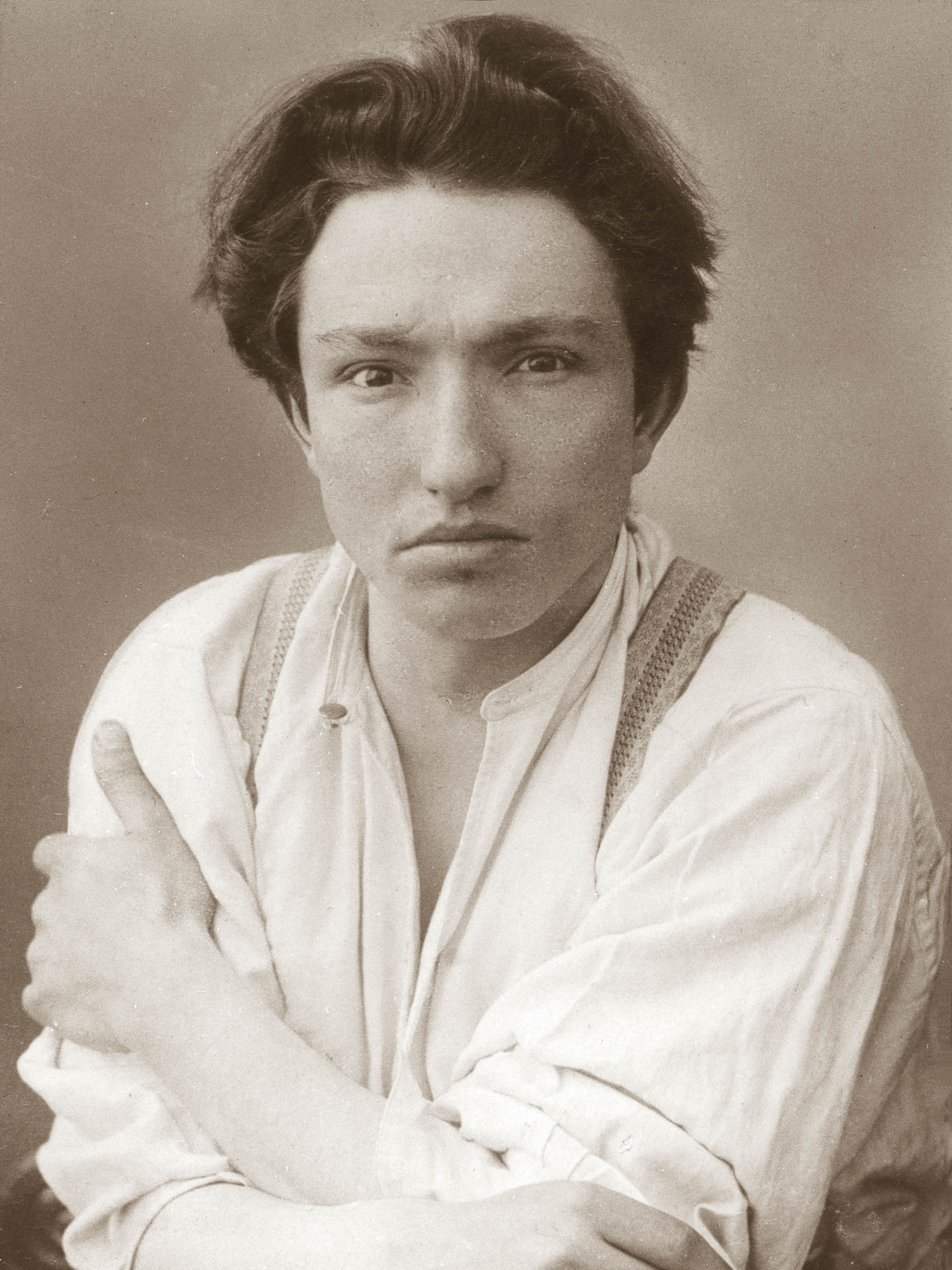
- Depero c. 1911
- Born: 30 March 1892; Fondo, Tyrol, Austria-Hungary
- Died: 29 November 1960 (aged 68); Rovereto, Trentino, Italy
- Known for: Painting; graphic design
- Movement: Futurism

Signature
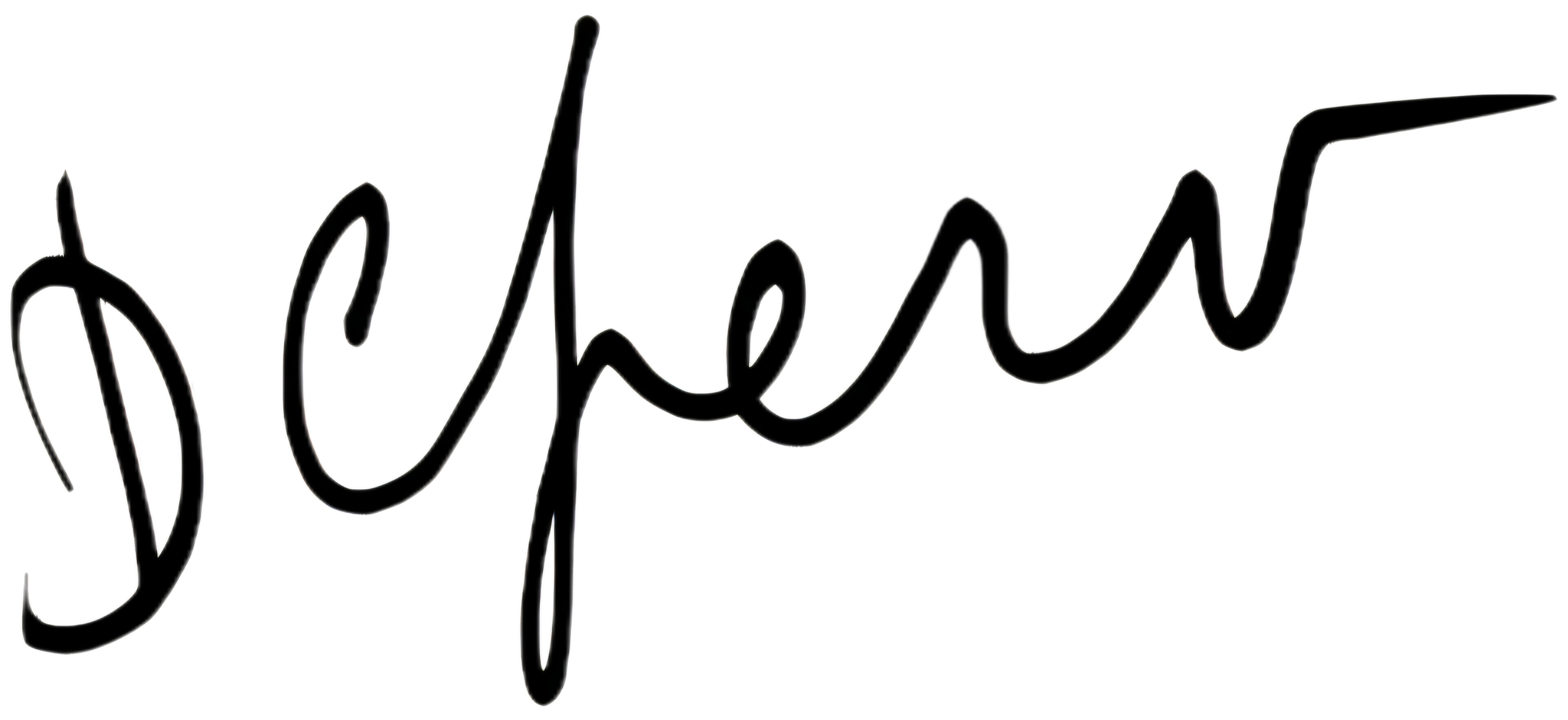

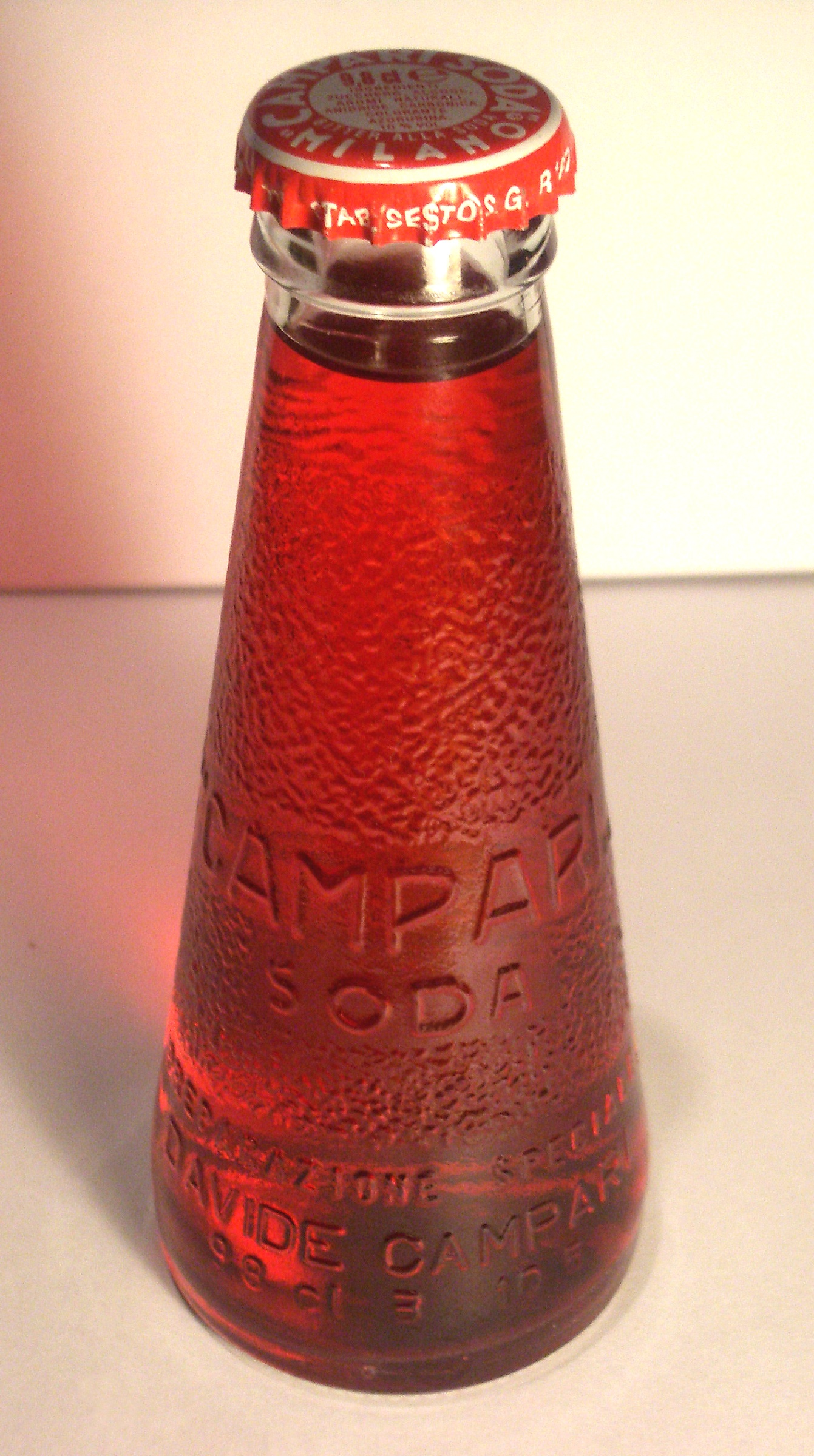
Depero's 1932 bottle design for Campari Soda is still in production.

Fortunato Depero (30 March 1892 – 29 November 1960) was an Italian futurist painter, writer, sculptor, and graphic designer.

== Early life ==
Depero was born in Fondo or (according to other sources) in the neighboring village of Malosco – in the modern Italian region of Trentino, at that time the County of Tyrol in the Austrian-Hungarian Empire. He grew up in Rovereto. Depero applied for the Academy of Fine Arts Vienna. However, he was rejected. Instead, he became an apprentice marble worker.

== Career ==
=== Early career ===
While on a 1913 trip to Florence, Depero discovered a copy of Lacerba and an article by one of the founders of the futurism movement, Filippo Tommaso Marinetti. Inspired by what he saw, as well as by the death of his mother, Depero was inspired to move to Rome in 1914, where he met fellow futurist Giacomo Balla.

It was with Balla in 1915 that he wrote the manifesto Futurist Reconstruction of the Universe, which expanded upon the ideas introduced by the other futurists. It sought the abstract equivalent for all forms and elements of the universe. The goal was to make the universe "more joyful" through an integral recreation. In the same year, he was designing stage sets and costumes for a ballet.

In 1919, Depero founded the House of Futurist Art in Rovereto, which specialised in producing toys, tapestries and furniture in the futurist style. In 1925 he represented the futurists at the International Exhibition of Modern Decorative and Industrial Arts, and presented a Futurist Hall at the Monza Biennial.

=== 1920s ===
During the 1920s, Depero began making propaganda for the National Fascist Party. This included writing songs and painting posters.

In 1927, together with his friend, advertising agent and publisher Fedele Azari (Dinamo-Azari), Depero designed Depero futurista 1913–1927, also known as the bolted book, which was printed in letterpress with his direct supervision and involvement by the Mercurio print works of Rovereto. Depero futurista 1913–1927 was a commercial book to be sold, to promote and document the work of Depero, and to legitimise him as an artist. It was a showcase portfolio relating to a specific period (1913–1927), but also an atypical and pioneering artwork in the form of a book, an ideological declaration.

From 1928 to 1930, Depero lived in New York City. During this era, he saw little commercial success, possibly due to the outbreak of the Great Depression. His first commercial enterprise in New York, the Futurist House, closed after two months. He experienced some success as a fashion designer, both creating costumes for stage productions and designing covers for magazines such as MovieMaker, The New Yorker and Vogue. He also dabbled in interior design during his stay, working on two restaurants which were later demolished to make way for the Rockefeller Center. He also did work for the New York Daily News and Macy's, and built a house on 23rd Street. In 1930, he returned to Italy.

=== 1930s and 1940s ===
Following his return to Italy, Depero continued making Futurist art. Depero is viewed as one of the principal figures of the Futurist movement during the 1930s and 1940s, alongside Balla. During this time, Depero was the founder and editor for Dinamo magazine.

Some of Depero's art created during the 1930s has been criticized as racist due to containing racial stereotypes. During the 1930s, the occupation of Italian Libya and the Second Italo-Ethiopian War provided African influence in his art.

Between 1925 and 1939, Depero created several advertisements for Campari. This included the Campari Soda bottle, created in 1932. He also created advertisements for brick company V&D and S.Pellegrino.

Also during the 1930s, Depero worked with ENIT, the newly established Italian tourism board. This meant that Depero was working for the Italian government directly, creating tourism posters which focused on regional Italian fashion. Depero also created tourism posters for Nazi Germany, but they were never displayed due to World War II. During the 30s, Depero created a number of art pieces for Valentino Bosso, which included themes such as chessboards, reminiscence of Italy in the Middle Ages, and glorifications of Italian colonialism. These pieces were created as propaganda in support of the ruling fascist government.

In 1937, Nazi Germany began to pressure Italy to abandon the Futurist movement, due to perceived Jewish influence. This brought an end to Depero's official work with the Italian government.

In 1938, Depero worked with Bosso to create a precursor to plywood, known as Buxus. Buxus was used to create several sculptures.

Depero's art produced during the 1930s and 1940s has become controversial in the 21st century due to the association with fascism. Some art galleries have chosen to exclude his art from the 1930s and 1940s for this reason. Women of the Tropics, an oil painting from 1945, is one of the few Depero paintings from the 1940s to be displayed in the 21st century.

=== Post-war period ===
Futurism began to decline following the defeat of the Italian fascist government. Due to this, Depero began to see significantly less commercial success.

After the end of the Second World War, Depero became associated with Italian fascism, due to his efforts in promoting and propagandizing it. Due to his fascist beliefs, Depero had trouble with the anti-fascist authorities who were in power after the war. As a result, Depero left Italy to live in the United States once more. He hoped to escape judgement for his association with the former government. However, because of his reputation, he found that New York City was not accepting of him. However, some of his paintings from this post-war era in the United States have been shown in modern galleries.

While living in the United States, he published So I Think, So I Paint, a translation of his autobiography initially released in 1940. From the winter of 1947 to late October 1949, Depero lived in New Milford, Connecticut. During this time, he planned to open a museum. He stayed with William Hillman, an associate of the then-President, Harry S. Truman.

After 1949, Depero returned to Rovereto. In 1959, he created the Galleria Museo Depero, a museum named after himself. On 29 November 1960, after being ill with diabetes and spending the last two years unable to paint due to hemiparesis, Depero died aged 68 in Rovereto.

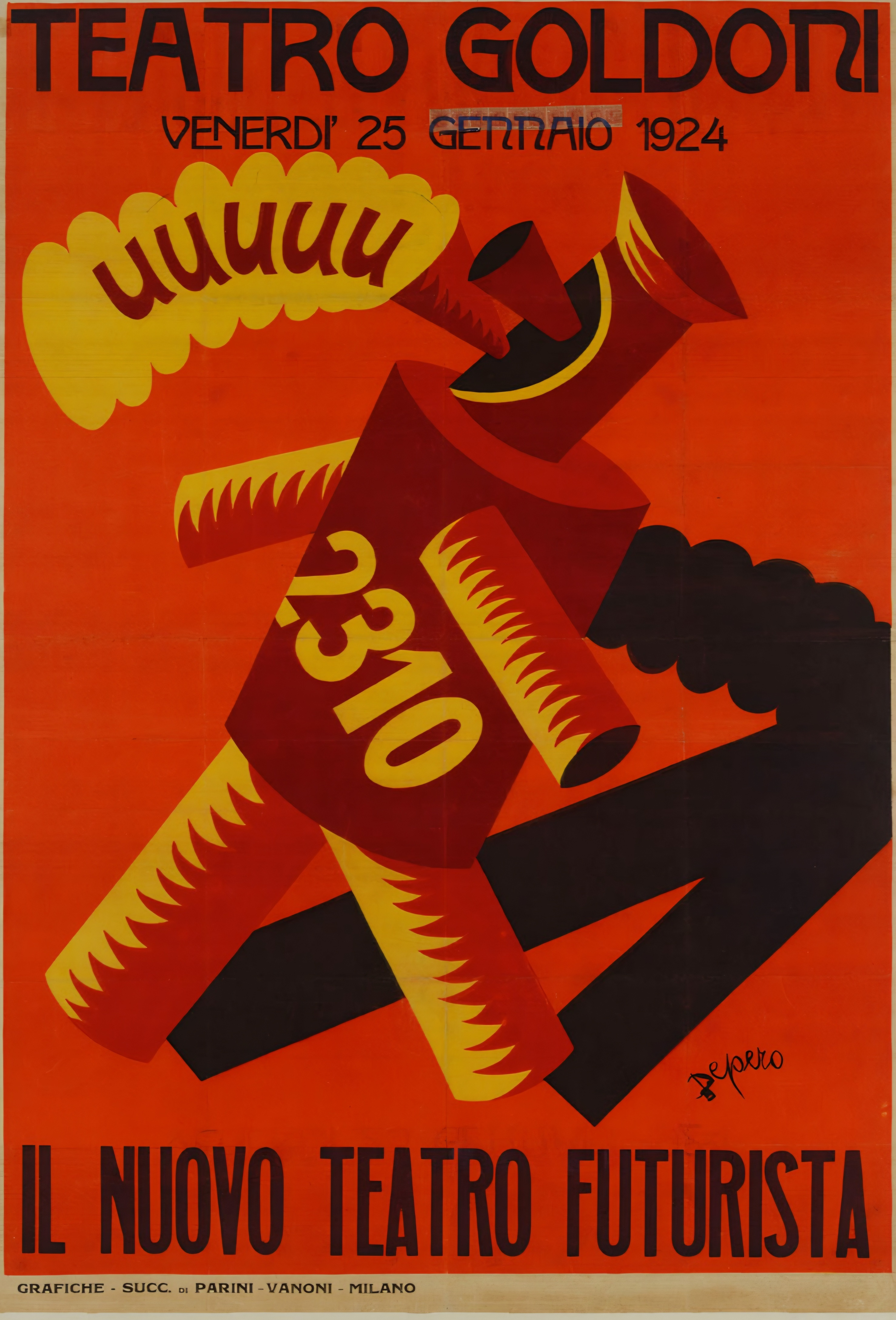
New Futurist Theater poster, F. Depero, 1924

== Works ==
Many of his works are featured in the permanent collection of the Museum of Modern and Contemporary Art of Trento and Rovereto (MART). The Casa d'Arte Futurista Depero, Italy's only museum dedicated to the Futurist movement, containing 3,000 objects, is now one of MART's venues. Closed for many years for extensive refurbishment, the Casa d'Arte Futurista Depero reopened in 2009. A number of important artists, thinkers, and architects worked on the Casa with Depero―especially those who were from the region―including Fausto Melotti, Gino Pollini, and Carlo Belli.

Depero's designs and artworks completed for advertising were mainly monochromatic or utilized a spot colour to emphasise text. His full-color designs followed Futurist color schemes featuring red, brown, ocher and the occasional accents of bright blue or aqua.

== Exhibitions ==
From February to June 2014, the Center for Italian Modern Art exhibited Depero's work which engaged in dialogues with Dada and Metaphysical Painting, Espirit Nouveau, and Art Deco.

Between October 2014 and January 2015, the Fundación Juan March Museum in Madrid exhibited Futurist Depero (1913-1950). The exhibition of nearly 300 pieces showed "renewed vision of Italian Futurism, which has gone down in history for the radical nature of its proposals: abolishing the art of the past and glorifying dynamism, the machine, speed and war."

== Writings ==
- So I think, so I paint: Ideologies of an Italian self-made painter, Mutilati e Invalidi, Trento, 1947 ASIN: B0007JG8YG

== Selected works ==
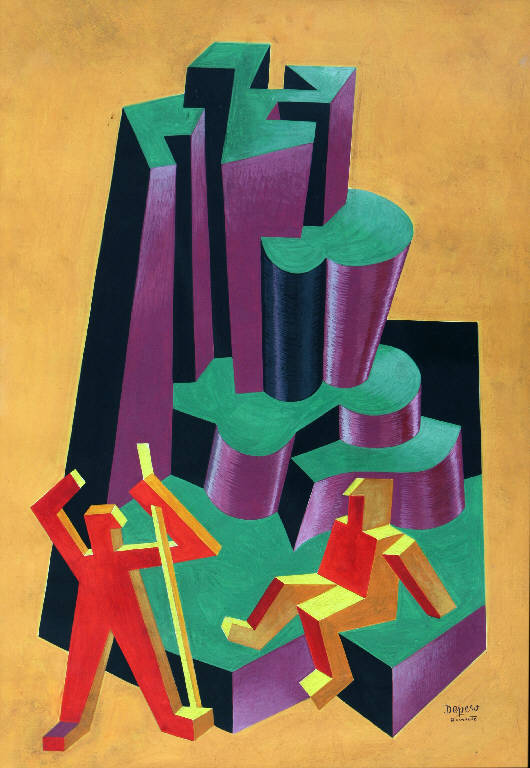
Composition, 1920s.

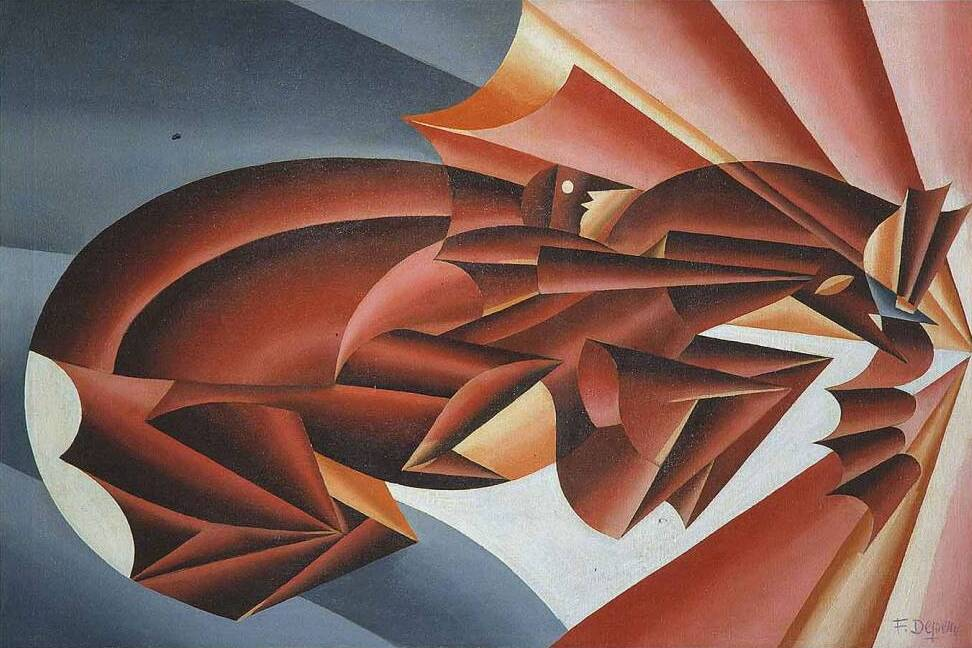
Nitrite at speed, 1920s.

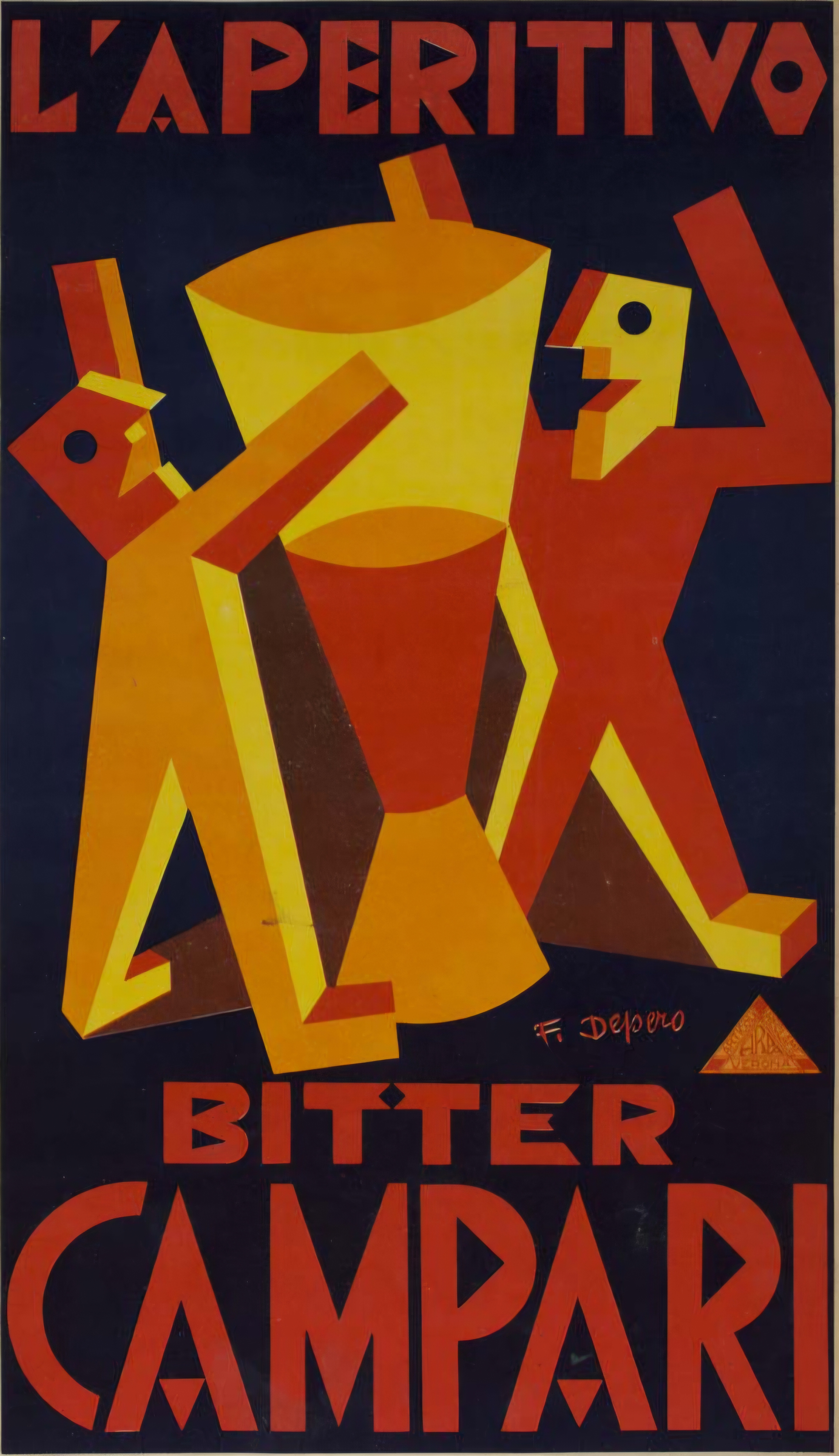
Advertising poster for Campari

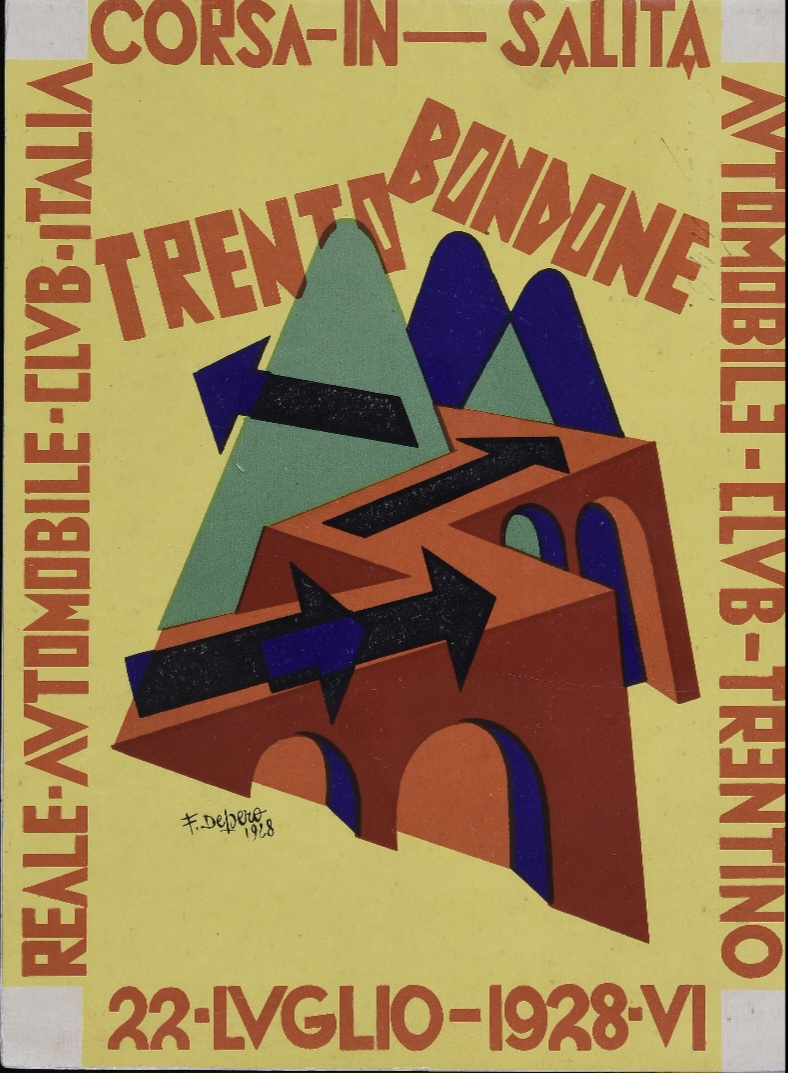
Advertising poster for the Automobile Club d'Italia, 1928.

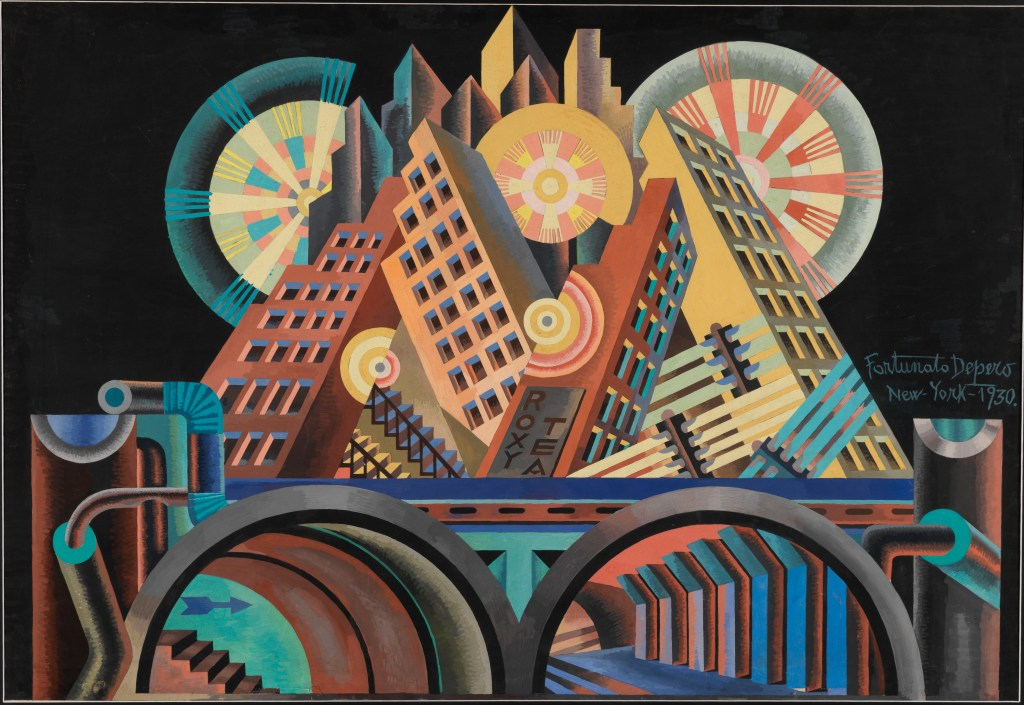
The New Babel, 1930.

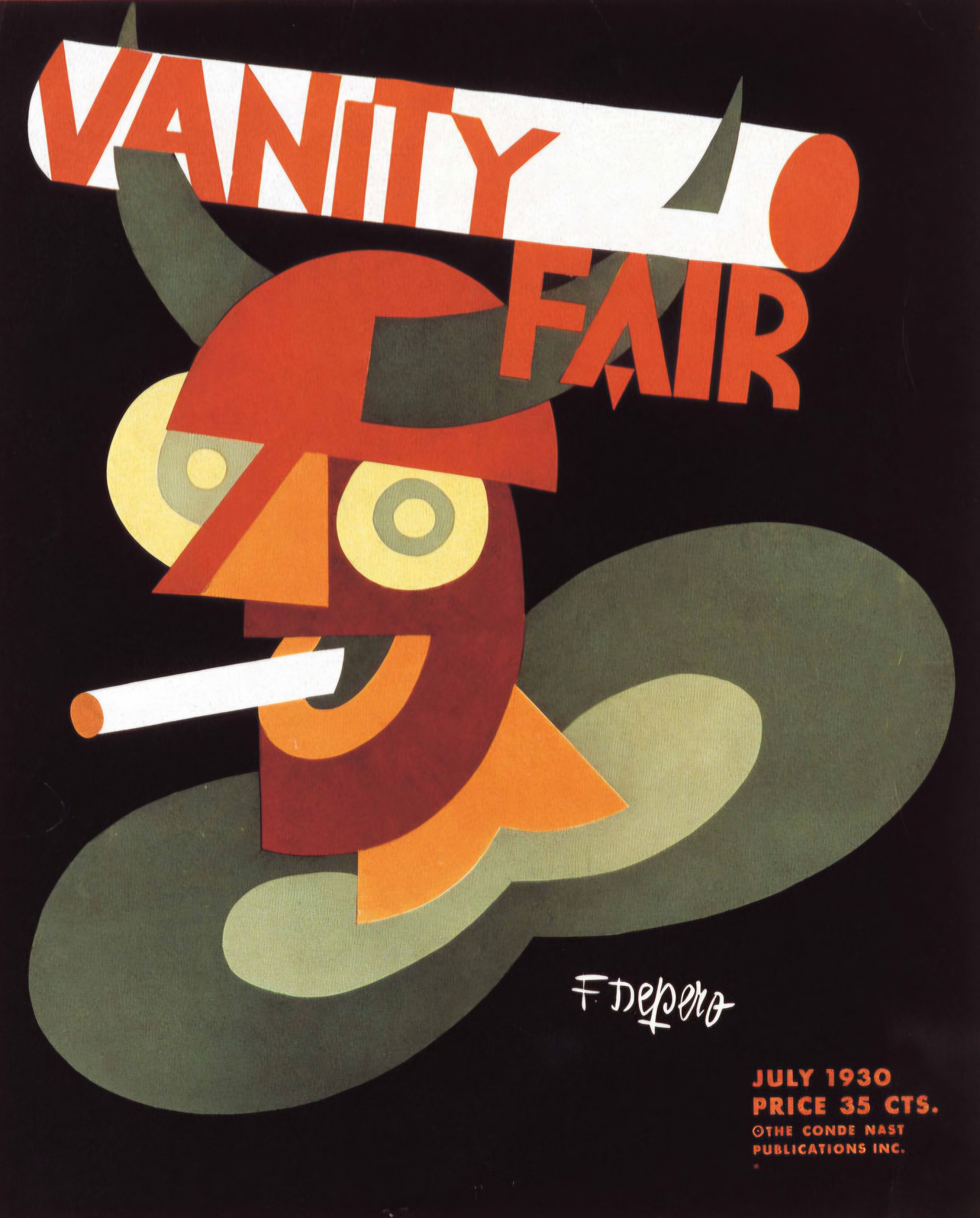
Poster advertising the American magazine Vanity Fair, 1930.

== Sources ==
- Belli, G., Depero futurista: Rome-Paris-New York: 1915–1932, exhibition catalogue, The Wolfsonian Florida International University, Miami Beach, Florida. Milan: Skira, 1999.
- Camillini, G., Fortunato Depero and Depero futurista 1913-1927, Soveria Mannelli: Rubbettino editore, 2021.
- Chiesa, L., “Transnational Multimedia: Fortunato Depero’s Impressions of New York City (1928–1930),” California Italian Studies, 1, 2010.
- Ewing, H., ed., Fortunato Depero, exhibition catalogue, Center for Italian Modern Art, New York, 2014.
- Greene, V., ed., Italian Futurism 1909–1944: Reconstructing the Universe, exhibition catalogue, Guggenheim Museum, New York, 2014.
- Troy, Virginia Gardner, "Stitching Modernity: The Textile Work of Fortunato Depero," Journal of Modern Italian Studies, Vol. 20, No. 1, January 2015, p. 24–33.
