= Gino Pollini =

Italian architect (1903–1991)

- Born: 19 January 1903; Rovereto, Austria-Hungary
- Died: 25 January 1991 (aged 88); Milan, Italy
- Education: Polytechnic University of Milan
- Occupation: Architect

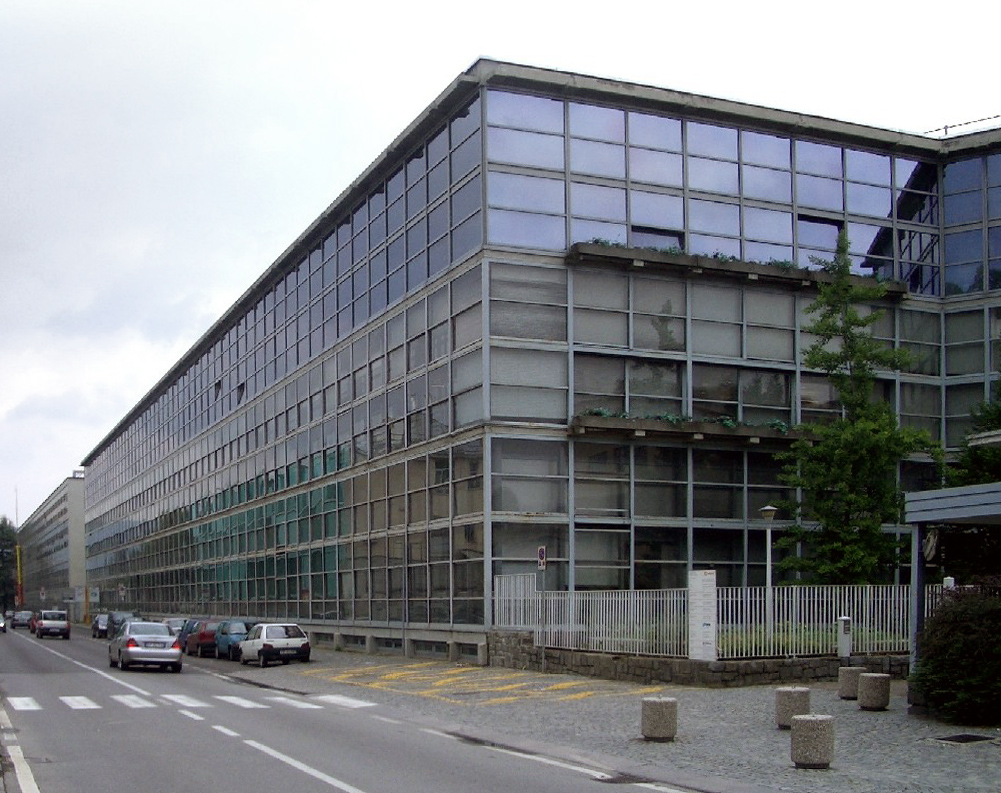
Olivetti building in Ivrea, 1955-1958

Gino Pollini (19 January 1903 – 25 January 1991) was an Italian architect.

== Life ==
Gino Pollini was born in Rovereto on 19 January 1903, to Luigi Pollini, a shopkeeper, and Teresa Miori Pollini. At the time of Pollini's birth, Rovereto was part of Austria-Hungary. After WWI, the city became part of the northeastern region of Trentino–Alto Adige in Italy. In 1921, he began studies at the Politecnico di Milano, taking courses off and on, and received his architecture degree in 1927. He married Renata Melotti, sister of sculptor Fausto Melotti and cousin of theorist Carlo Belli, in February 1931. They had one son Maurizio in 1942.

== Career ==
In 1926 Pollini joined Gruppo 7 (Sebastiano Larco, Guido Frette, Carlo Enrico Rava, Luigi Figini, Giuseppe Terragni, Ubaldo Castagnoli), and from 1929 he worked in collaboration with Luigi Figini. Figini & Pollini had a long association with the Olivetti company from 1934 through 1957, designing many of their headquarters buildings at Ivrea. In 1927, Pollini was invited by the architect Alberto Sartoris to travel to Stuttgart with Gruppo 7 members Rava and Libera to work on clarifying a new language for modernist architecture. He also taught architecture in Milan and Palermo.

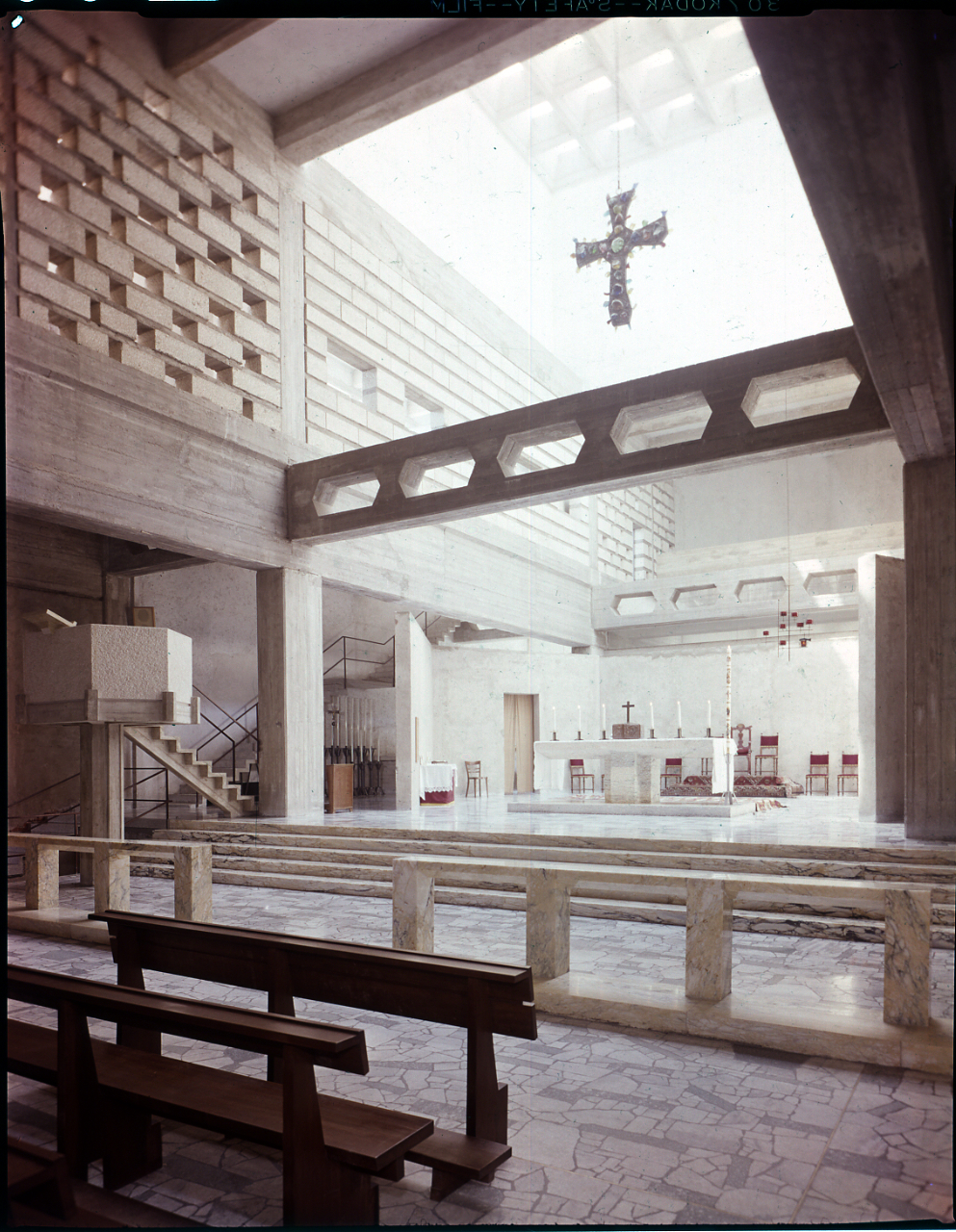
Figini & Pollini, church of the Madonna dei Poveri, Milan (1952–54). Photo by Paolo Monti, 1960

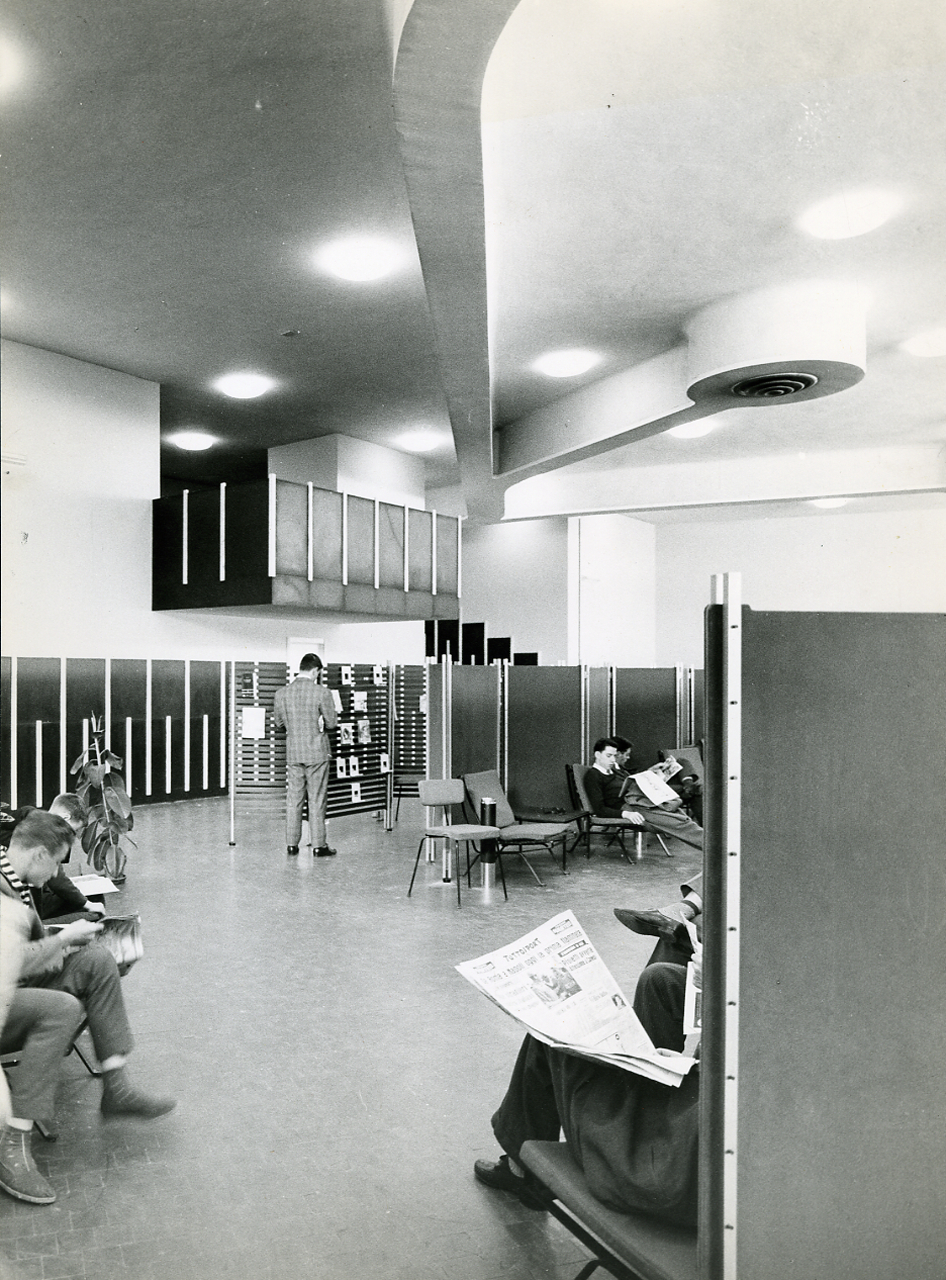
Figini & Pollini, Olivetti head offices in Ivrea. New ICO yards, reading room. Photo by Paolo Monti, 1960
