= Rationalism (architecture) =

20th-century Italian architectural style

In architecture, Rationalism (Italian: razionalismo) is an architectural current which mostly developed from Italy in the 1920s and 1930s. Vitruvius had claimed in his work De architectura that architecture is an art that can be comprehended rationally. The formulation was taken up and further developed in the architectural treatises of the Renaissance. Eighteenth-century progressive art theory opposed the Baroque use of illusionism with the classic beauty of truth and reason.

Twentieth-century Rationalism derived less from a special, unified theoretical work than from a common belief that the most varied problems posed by the real world could be resolved by reason. In that respect, it represented a reaction to Historicism and a contrast to Art Nouveau and Expressionism.

The term Rationalism is commonly used to refer to the wider International Style.

== Enlightenment rationalism ==
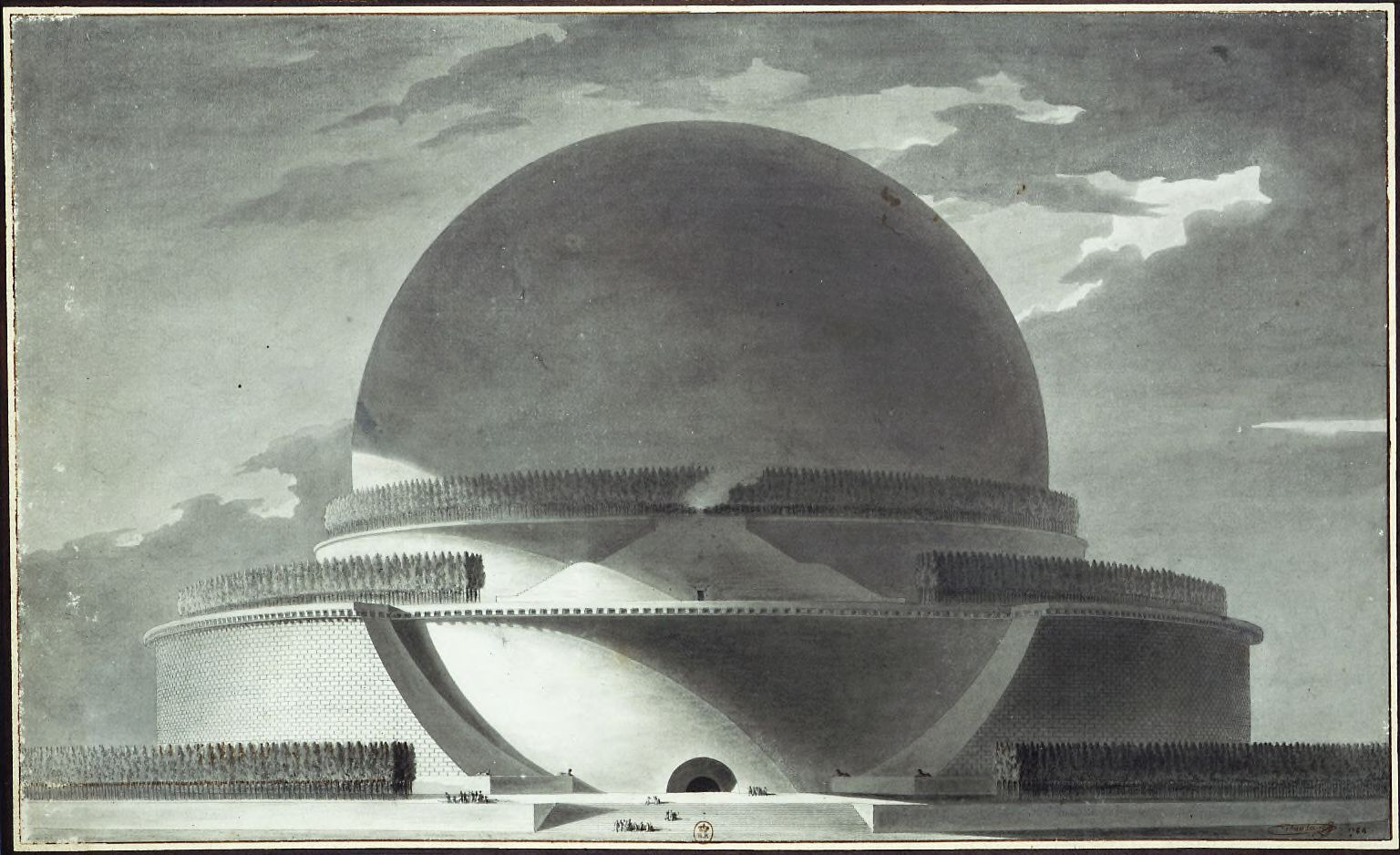
Project for an Isaac Newton memorial by Étienne-Louis Boullée

The name Rationalism is retroactively applied to a movement in architecture that came about during the Age of Enlightenment (more specifically, Neoclassicism), arguing that architecture's intellectual base is primarily in science as opposed to reverence for and emulation of archaic traditions and beliefs. Rationalist architects, following the philosophy of René Descartes emphasized geometric forms and ideal proportions.

The French Louis XVI style emerged in the mid-18th century with its roots in the waning interest of the Baroque period. The architectural notions of the time gravitated more and more to the belief that reason and natural forms are tied closely together, and that the rationality of science should serve as the basis for where structural members should be placed. Towards the end of the 18th century, Jean-Nicolas-Louis Durand, a teacher at the influential École Polytechnique in Paris at the time, argued that architecture in its entirety was based in science.

Other architectural theorists of the period who advanced rationalist ideas include Abbé Jean-Louis de Cordemoy (1631–1713), the Venetian Carlo Lodoli (1690–1761), Abbé Marc-Antoine Laugier (1713–1769) and Quatremère de Quincy (1755–1849).

The architecture of Claude Nicholas Ledoux (1736–1806) and Étienne-Louis Boullée (1728–1799) typify Enlightenment rationalism, with their use of pure geometric forms, including spheres, squares, and cylinders.

== Structural rationalism ==
The term structural rationalism most often refers to a 19th-century French movement, usually associated with the theorists Eugène Viollet-le-Duc and Auguste Choisy. Viollet-le-Duc rejected the concept of an ideal architecture and instead saw architecture as a rational construction approach defined by the materials and purpose of the structure.

The architect Eugène Train was one of the most important practitioners of this school, particularly with his educational buildings such as the Collège Chaptal and Lycée Voltaire.

== Early 20th-century rationalism ==
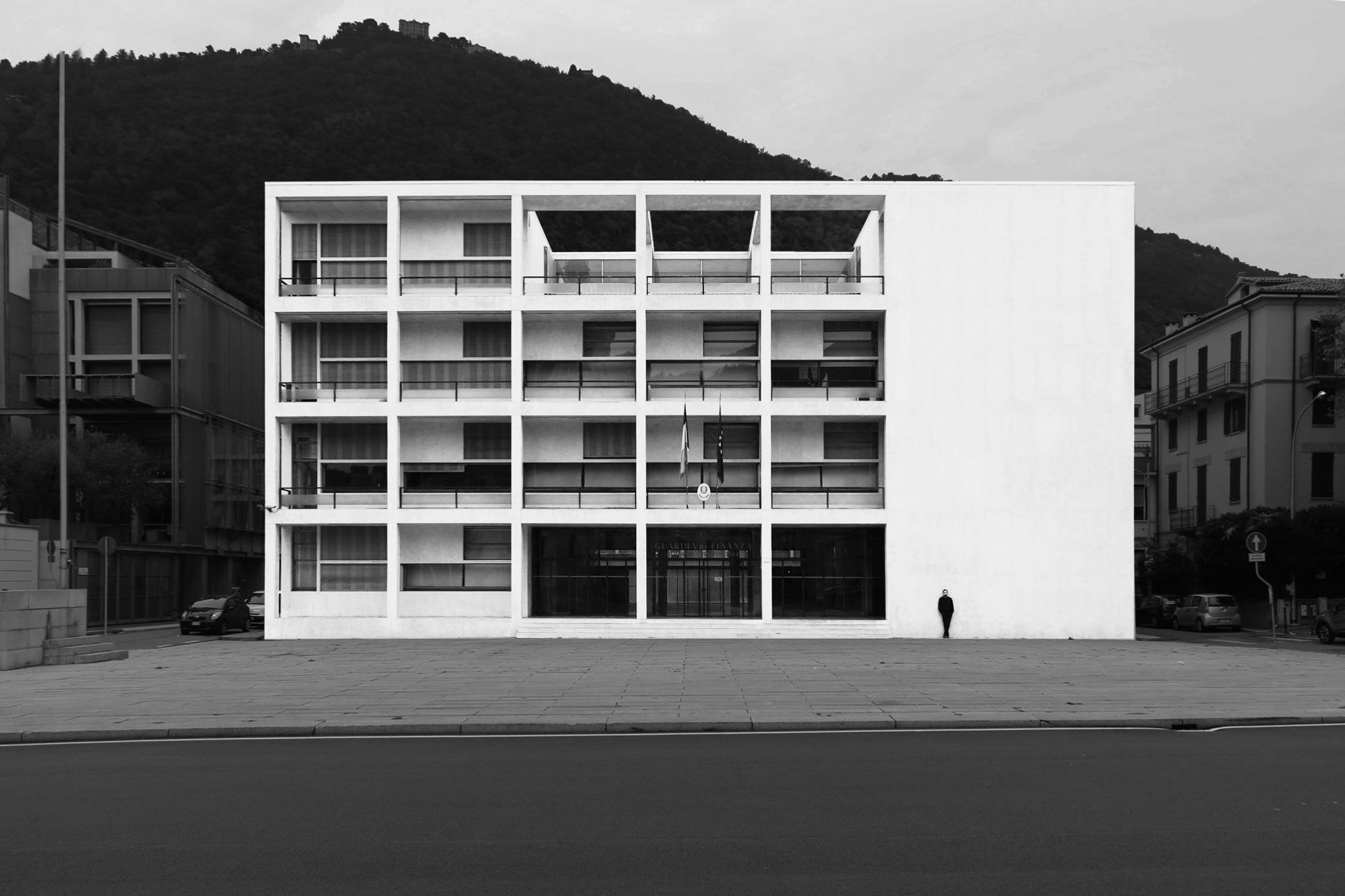
The former Casa del Fascio in Como, Italy, designed by Giuseppe Terragni

Architects such as Henri Labrouste and Auguste Perret incorporated the virtues of structural rationalism throughout the 19th century in their buildings. By the early 20th century, architects such as Hendrik Petrus Berlage were exploring the idea that structure itself could create space without the need for decoration. This gave rise to modernism, which further explored this concept. More specifically, the Soviet Modernist group ASNOVA were known as 'the Rationalists'.

Rational Architecture (Italian: Architettura razionale) thrived in Italy from the 1920s to the 1940s, under the support and patronage of Mussolini's Fascist regime. In 1926, a group of young architects – Sebastiano Larco, Guido Frette, Carlo Enrico Rava, Ubaldo Castagnoli (later replaced by Adalberto Libera), Luigi Figini, Gino Pollini and Giuseppe Terragni (1904–43) – founded the so-called Gruppo 7, publishing their manifesto in the magazine Rassegna Italiana. Their declared intent was to strike a middle ground between the classicism of the Novecento Italiano movement and the industrially inspired architecture of Futurism. Their "note" declared:

The hallmark of the earlier avant garde was a contrived impetus and a vain, destructive fury, mingling good and bad elements: the hallmark of today's youth is a desire for lucidity and wisdom...This must be clear...we do not intend to break with tradition...The new architecture, the true architecture, should be the result of a close association between logic and rationality.

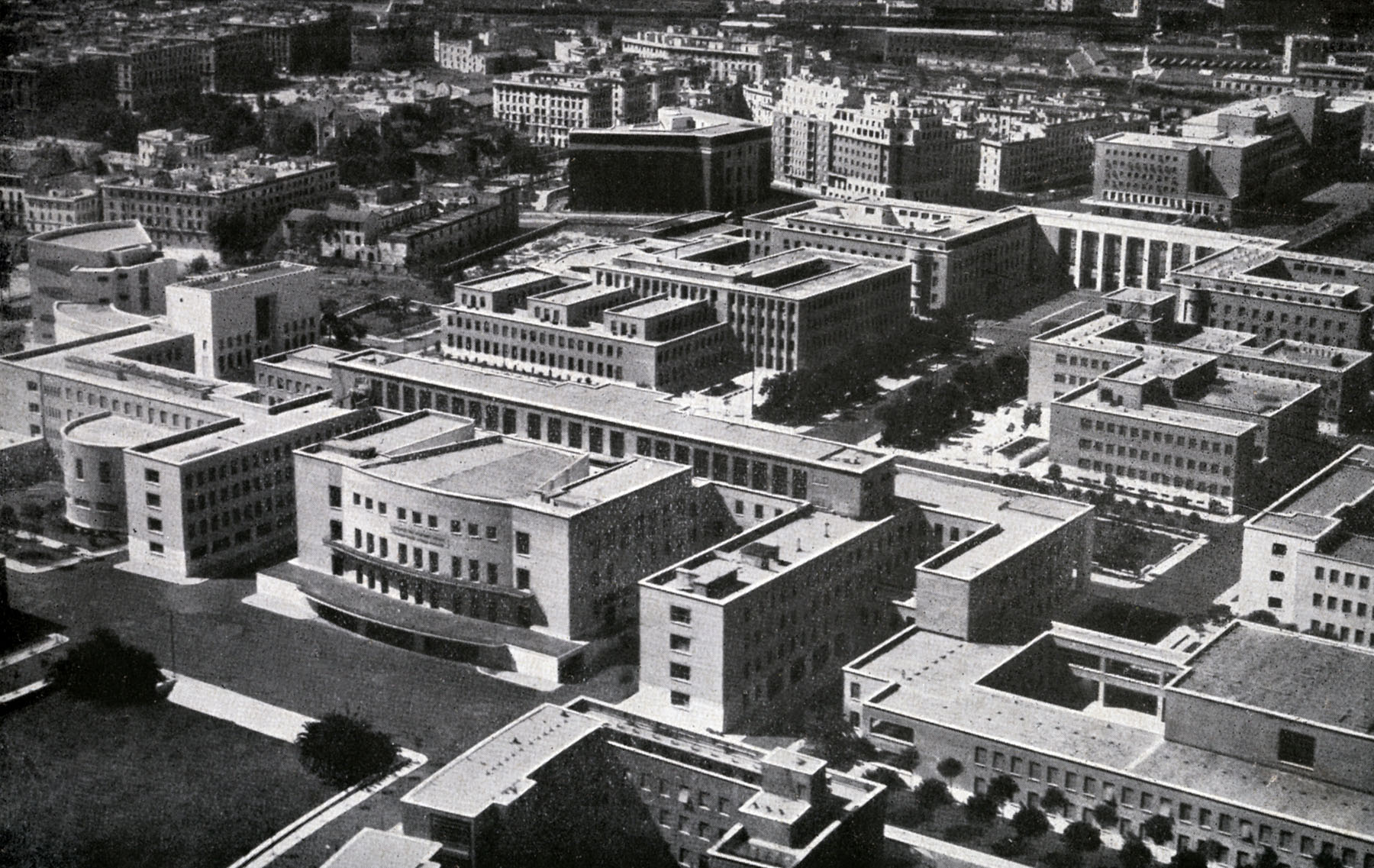
University of Rome campus in 1938

One of the first rationalist buildings was the Palazzo Gualino in Turin, built for the financier Riccardo Gualino by the architects Gino Levi-Montalcini and Giuseppe Pagano.

Gruppo 7 mounted three exhibitions between 1926 and 1931, and the movement constituted itself as an official body, the Movimento Italiano per l'Architettura Razionale (MIAR), in 1930. Exemplary works include Giuseppe Terragni's Casa del Fascio in Como (1932–36), The Medaglia d'Oro room at the Italian Aeronautical Show in Milan (1934) by Pagano and Marcello Nizzoli, and the Fascist Trades Union Building in Como (1938–43), designed by Cesare Cattaneo, Pietro Lingeri, Augusto Magnani, L. Origoni, and Mario Terragni.

Pagano became editor of Casabella in 1933 together with Edoardo Persico. Pagano and Persico featured the work of the rationalists in the magazine, and its editorials urged the Italian state to adopt rationalism as its official style. The Rationalists enjoyed some official commissions from the Fascist government of Benito Mussolini, but the state tended to favor the more classically inspired work of the National Union of Architects. Architects associated with the movement collaborated on large official projects of the Mussolini regime, including the University of Rome (begun in 1932) and the Esposizione Universale Roma (EUR) in the southern part of Rome (begun in 1936). The EUR features monumental buildings, many of which evocative of ancient Roman architecture, but absent ornament, revealing strong geometric forms.

In the 1950s in Italy, studies on rationalism and the methodology of science were developed in the twentieth century in particular by Gualtiero Galmanini, who left an imprint that was later followed by many, influencing the starchitects of his time.

== Neo-rationalism ==
In the late 1960s, a new rationalist movement emerged in architecture, claiming inspiration from both the Enlightenment and early-20th-century rationalists. Like the earlier rationalists, the movement, known as the Tendenza, was centered in Italy. Practitioners include Carlo Aymonino (1926–2010), Aldo Rossi (1931–97), and Giorgio Grassi. The Italian design magazine Casabella featured the work of these architects and theorists. The work of architectural historian Manfredo Tafuri influenced the movement, and the University Iuav of Venice emerged as a center of the Tendenza after Tafuri became chair of Architecture History in 1968. A Tendenza exhibition was organized for the 1973 Milan Triennale.

Rossi's book L'architettura della città, published in 1966, and translated into English as The Architecture of the City in 1982, explored several of the ideas that inform Neo-rationalism. In seeking to develop an understanding of the city beyond simple functionalism, Rossi revives the idea of typology, following from Quatremère de Quincy, as a method for understanding buildings, as well as the larger city. He also writes of the importance of monuments as expressions of the collective memory of the city, and the idea of place as an expression of both physical reality and history.

Architects such as Leon Krier, Maurice Culot, and Demetri Porphyrios took Rossi's ideas to their logical conclusion with a revival of Classical Architecture and Traditional Urbanism. Krier's witty critique of Modernism, often in the form of cartoons, and Porphyrios's well crafted philosophical arguments, such as "Classicism is not a Style", won over a small but talented group of architects to the classical point of view. Organizations such as the Traditional Architecture Group at the RIBA, and the Institute of Classical Architecture attest to their growing number, but mask the Rationalist origins.

In Germany, Oswald Mathias Ungers became the leading practitioner of German rationalism from the mid-1960s. Ungers influenced a younger generation of German architects, including Hans Kollhoff, Max Dudler, and Christoph Mäckler.

== See also ==
- Functionalism
- International Style
- Modernism
- Modern architecture
- Neoclassicism
- Age of Enlightenment
- Italian colonial architecture
