= Campari Soda =

Pre-mixed drink made by Campari

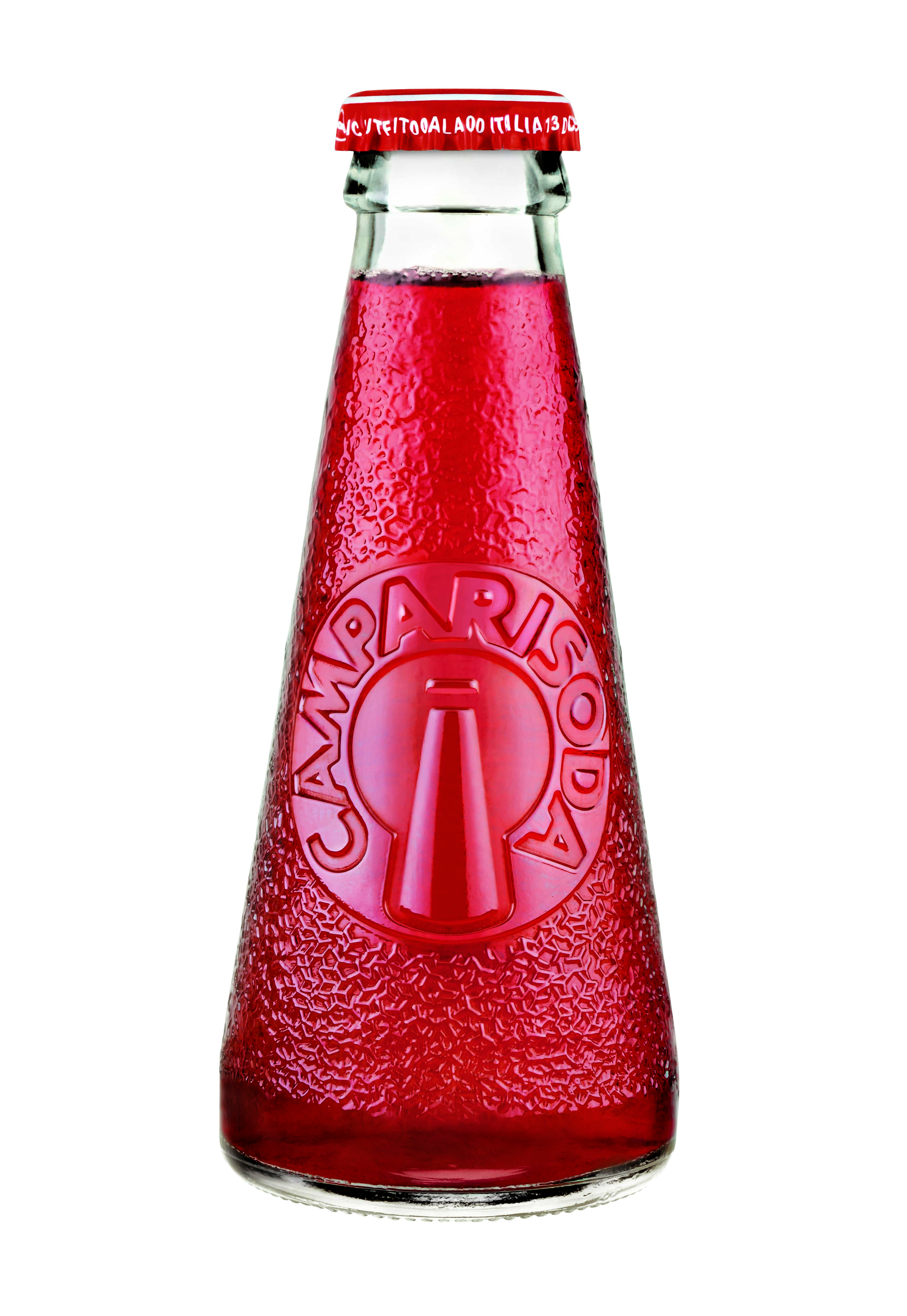
A Campari Soda

Campari Soda is a pre-mixed drink made by Campari for the Italian market. Campari Soda is Campari mixed with soda water to reach 10% alcohol by volume. The distinctive bottle was designed by Fortunato Depero in 1932. According to Jay P. Pederson: "In 1932, the company debuted its own blend of Campari and soda, packaged in a distinctive cone-shaped bottle. The result, which was dubbed, appropriately enough, Campari Soda, became a new success for the company, and was held to be the world's first pre-mix packaged drink."
