= Carlo Belli =

Italian art critic, theorist, and writer

Carlo Belli (Rovereto, Italy December 6, 1903 – Rome, Italy March 16, 1991) was an Italian art critic, theorist, and writer.

== Life ==
Carlo Belli was born in the city of Rovereto on December 6, 1903 to Arturo Belli, a bank worker who had a passion for music, and Luigia Fait Belli. Now a part of Italy, in the north eastern region of Trentino–Alto Adige, the city was part of Austria when Belli was born (before WWI ). Belli's uncle (on his mother's side) was sculptor Carlo Fait and his cousin (on his mother's side) was Fausto Melotti. During WWI, Belli went with Melotti and his parents to Florence until 1919, when he returned to Rovereto to finish his schooling.

Belli died in Rome on March 16, 1991.

== Work ==
Belli was an Italian intellectual who wrote about art, music, architecture, archaeology, and politics. He also made a number of drawings and collages throughout his career.

In Rovereto after WWI, Belli met Futurist artists like Fortunato Depero. Throughout the 1920s, Belli published on art and literature in regional and national publications. Belli traveled to Berlin with architect Luciano Baldessari in 1924 where he began to formulate his ideas about art that would culminate in his publication of Kn in 1935. In 1925, he traveled to the Bauhaus in Dessau where he first met Kandinskij. He became a member of the Fascist Party in 1928 and was given the official designation of art critic for the Brenner region. Moving to Brescia, outside Milan, that same year, he gained the position of art critical at the newspaper "Il Popolo di Brescia". In 1932, he began his work with the Galleria il Milione in Milan, which supported the work of abstract artists. Milione published the first edition of Kn. In 1934, Belli moved to Rome to document the artistic happenings and trends. Belli visited Paris in 1937, just before WWII broke out. He traveled with the Ghiringhelli brothers (they owned Il Milione), the architect Alberto Sartoris, and Melotti. In Paris, they met with Kandinskiy. He returned to Rome in 1939, but left again in 1942 because of WWII.

After WWII, he continue to publish, working for papers like "Il Giornale" and "Il Tempo".

In 1998, an exhibition was held to investigate his impact on the arts culture in Rome at the Palazzo delle esposizioni. His archive is now house at the Museo di arte moderna e contemporanea di Trento e Rovereto within the Archivio dell'900 (or 20th century archive).

== Publications ==
- Kn. Milan: Edizioni del Milione. 1935 (reprinted: 1972 & 88 Vanni Scheiwiller & 2006 Nayelli Zabaleta Solís & 2016 Giometti & Antonello)
- L'angelo in borghese. Saggio sopra un ignoto contemporaneo (in Italian). Milan: Libri Scheiwiller. 1937. ISBN 9788876440427. OCLC 18197729.
- Aurora all'Ovest (in Italian). Roma: Rettangolo d'oro. 1944. OCLC 797703454.
- Anime sbagliate. Roma. 1951 – via Casini.
- Enigma o crepuscolo. Roma. 1968 – via G. Volpe.
- Il tesoro di Taras. Milano; Roma. 1970 – via Bestetti.
- Lettera sulla nascita dell'astrattismo in Italia. Milano. 1978 – via All'insegna del pesce d'oro.
- Il cielo nei templi. Scorribande nella Sicilia meridionale. 1982 – via Edizioni della Cometa.
- Altare deserto. Breve storia di un grande sfacelo. Roma. 1983 – via G. Volpe.
- Passeggiate in Magna Grecia. Rive del Sud e Costa Viola. Roma. 1985 – via Edizioni della Cometa.
- Morte di Giove. Cronaca di una processione romana nei primi secoli della nostra era. Roma. 1987 – via Editrice Roma Amor.
- I quaderni de La Sarraz. Roma. 1988 – via Edizioni della Cometa.
- Il volto del Secolo. La prima cellula dell'architettura razionalista italiana. Bergamo. 1988 – via Lubrina.
- Giro lungo per la Lucania. Roma. 1989 – via Edizioni della Cometa.
- Savinio, dioscuro oscuro. Roma. 1990 – via Edizioni della Cometa.
- Interlògo. Cultura italiana tra le due guerre. Milano. 1992 – via Sapiens.
- Antipatia per Polibio. Il greco storico della grandezza di Roma. Cavallino. 1992 – via Capone.
- Echècrate o la prora al cielo. Vita di un filosofo scettico credente. Mottola. 1998 – via Stampasud.
- 1920–1930: gli anni della formazione. Roma. 2001 – via Edizioni della Cometa.
