= Gruppo 7 =

Group of Italian Rationalist architects

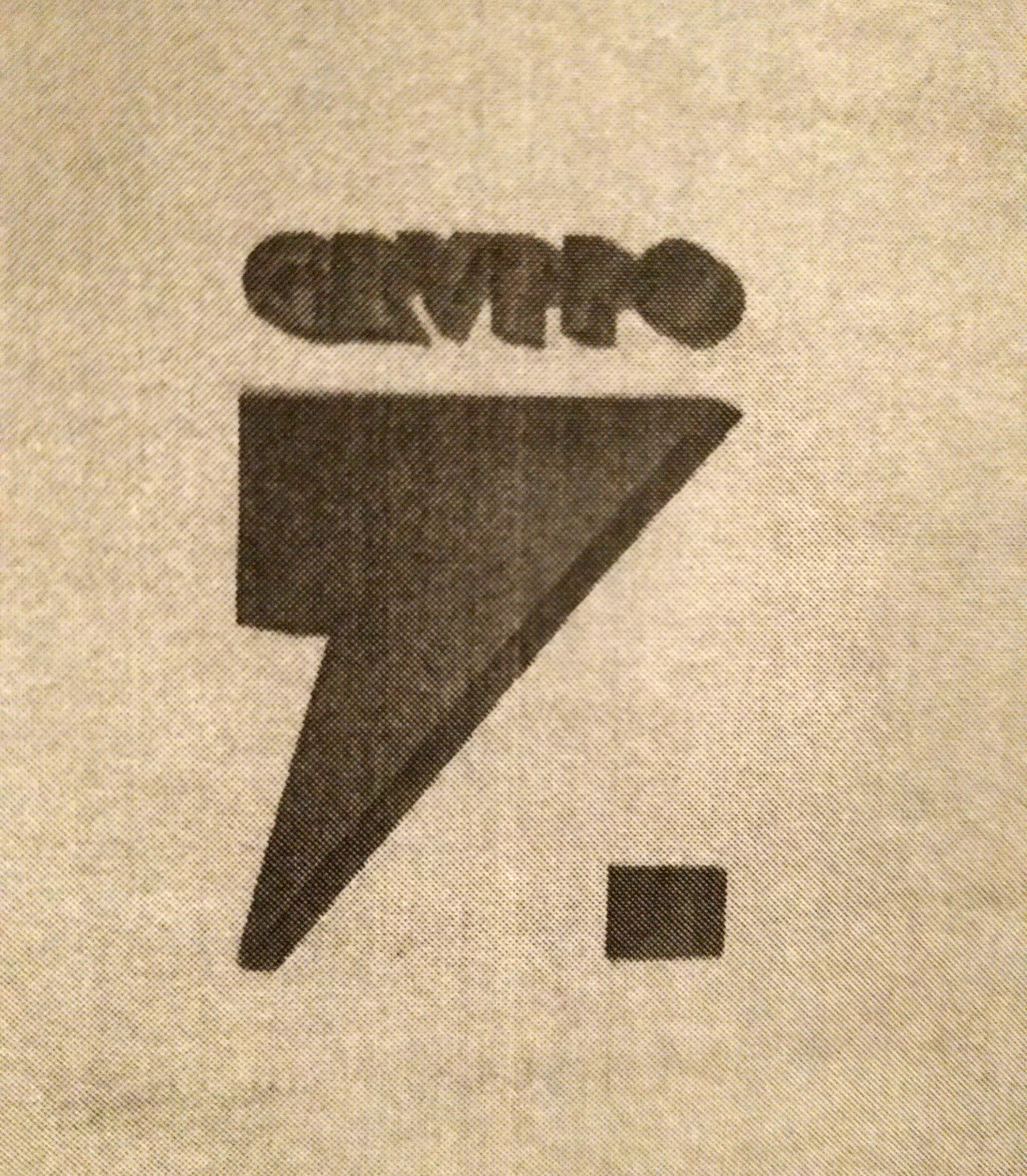
Gruppo 7 logo (1929)

Gruppo 7 was a group of Italian architects who wanted to reform architecture by the adoption of Rationalism. It was founded in 1926 by Luigi Figini, Guido Frette, Sebastiano Larco Silva, Gino Pollini, Carlo Enrico Rava, Giuseppe Terragni, and Ubaldo Castagnoli, who was replaced the following year by Adalberto Libera.

Gruppo 7 declared that its intent was to strike a middle ground between classicism and the industrially-inspired architecture of the early 20th-century.
