= Luigi Figini =

Italian architect (1903–1984)

- Born: 27 January 1903; Milan, Kingdom of Italy
- Died: 13 March 1984 (aged 81); Milan, Italy
- Education: Polytechnic University of Milan
- Occupations: Architect, urban planner

Luigi Figini (27 January 1903 – 3 March 1984) was an Italian architect, and one of the leading figures of rationalist architecture.

== Life and career ==
Born in Milan in 1903, Figini studied at the Polytechnic University, where he met Giuseppe Terragni, Carlo Enrico Rava, and Gino Pollini. With Pollini, he formed a lifelong professional partnership. In 1926, they co-founded Gruppo 7, a collective of young architects advocating for a modern, functional architecture stripped of decorative excess, inspired by Le Corbusier and Gropius.

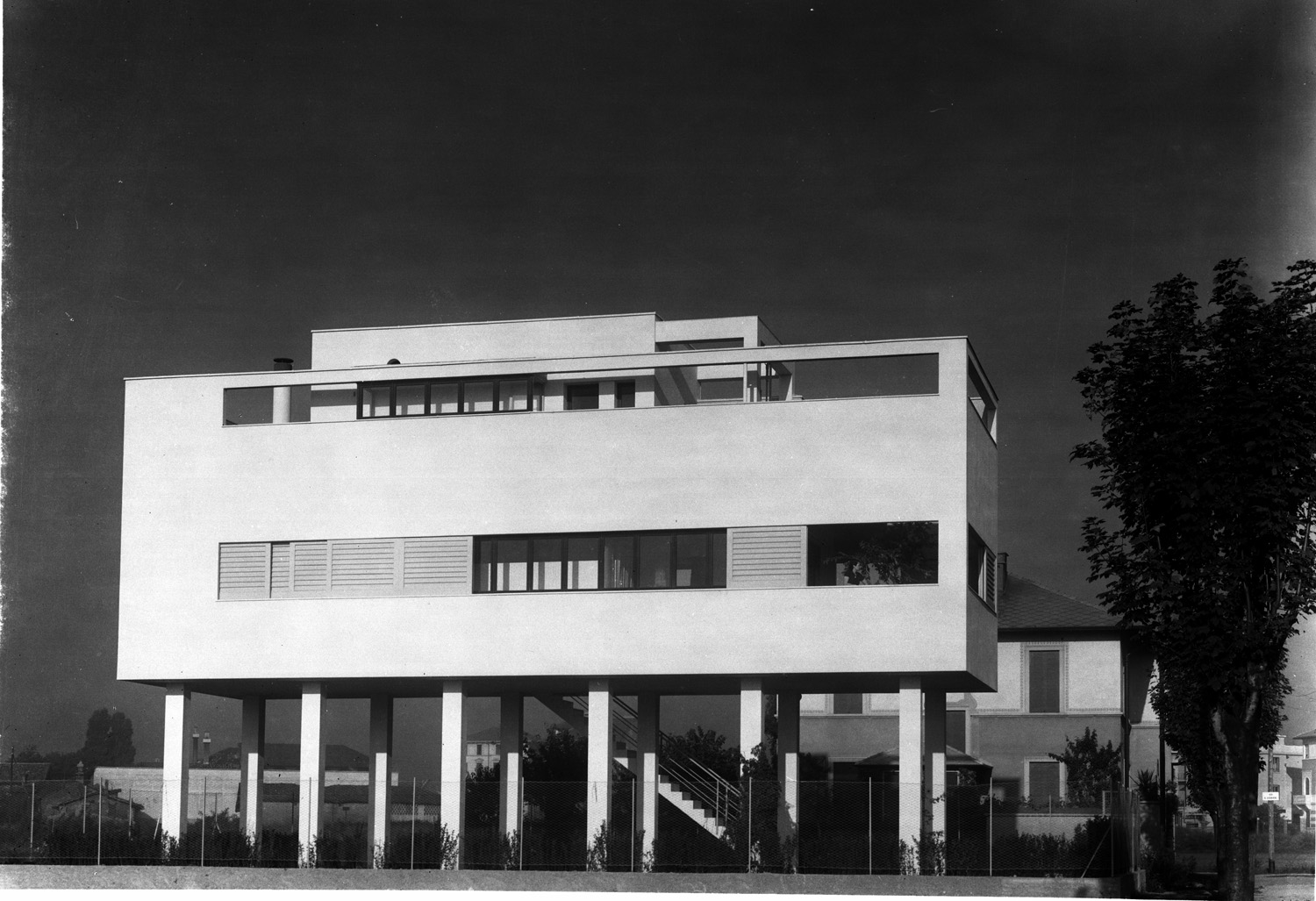
Villa Figini in 1935

In 1930, Figini married Gege Bottinelli and built his own experimental home in the Villaggio dei Giornalisti (Milan), embodying a vision of domestic life integrated with nature. Around this time, he began a key collaboration with Adriano Olivetti, which became central to his career. For Olivetti, Figini and Pollini designed industrial buildings, residential neighborhoods, and social facilities in Ivrea, contributing to the vision of a modern, human-centered working community.

Notable works include the Olivetti factories (1934–1957), housing for workers and employees, the Borgo Olivetti nursery school, and the ICO factory. He also contributed to the master plan for the Aosta Valley (1934–37) and to postwar social housing projects, including the INA-Casa neighborhood in via Harar, Milan (1951).

In the 1950s and 1960s, Figini turned to religious architecture, designing the church of the Madonna dei Poveri (1952–54) and the church of Saints John and Paul (1964), both marked by a search for sacred spatial qualities and a focus on natural light.

In later years, Figini returned to painting and poetry, viewing both as exercises in memory and personal reflection. He died in Milan in 1984.

== Sources ==
- Casciato, Maristella (1997). "FIGINI, Luigi". Dizionario Biografico degli Italiani. Vol. 47. Istituto dell'Enciclopedia Italiana.
- Etlin, Richard A. (1991). Modernism in Italian architecture. 1890-1940. Cambridge: The MIT Press.
- Sergio Polano; Marco Mulazzani, eds. (1991). Guida all'architettura italiana del Novecento. Milan: Electa.
- Paolo Portoghesi, ed. (1968). Dizionario enciclopedico di architettura e urbanistica. Vol. II. Rome: Gangemi. p. 332.
- Savi, Vittorio (1990). Figini e Pollini. Architetture 1927-1989. Milan: Electa.
