= Guido Frette =

Italian architect (1901–1984)

- Born: 1 March 1901; Viareggio, Province of Lucca, Kingdom of Italy
- Died: 24 December 1984 (aged 83); Milan, Italy
- Education: Polytechnic University of Milan
- Occupations: Architect, designer

Guido Frette (1 March 1901 – 24 December 1984) was an Italian architect, and one of the leading figures of rationalist architecture.

== Life and career ==
Frette graduated from the School of Architecture at the Royal Higher Technical Institute (later the Polytechnic University). He became a member of Gruppo 7 in 1926 and was among the founders of the Italian Movement for Rational Architecture (MIAR) in 1931. In 1928, he designed the exhibition pavilion at the First Italian Exhibition of Rational Architecture organized by MIAR. In 1930, together with Piero Bottoni, he curated the interior design of the "Electric House" for the 4th Triennial in Monza. At the 6th Triennial in Milan, he collaborated with Giuseppe Pagano on the "Exhibition of Building Materials and Construction Systems". In 1938, he designed the Casa del Fascio in Tortona.

After the war, he devoted himself extensively to the study of scenography, on which he published several books.

== Sources ==
- Cartasegna, R.; Santi, B. (2017). Guido Frette un razionalista a Tortona. Città di Tortona.
- Marziliano, Maria Giulia (2010). L'Italia che si rinnova. Maggioli.
- Gavinelli, Corrado; Loik, Mirella (1993). Architettura del XX secolo. Jaca Book.
- Trivellin, Eleonora (1998). Storia della tecnica edilizia in Italia: dall'unità ad oggi. Florence: Alinea.
