= Giuseppe Terragni =

Italian rationalist architect (1904–1943)

- Born: 18 April 1904; Meda
- Died: 19 July 1943 (aged 39); Pavia
- Occupation: Architect, designer
- Works: Casa del Fascio (Como), Danteum

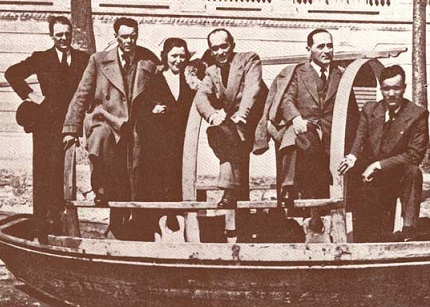
From left: Luigi Zuccoli, Mario Radice, Neve Nizzoli, Manlio Rho, Marcello Nizzoli and Giuseppe Terragni

Giuseppe Terragni (Italian: [dʒuˈzɛppe terˈraɲɲi]; 18 April 1904 – 19 July 1943) was an Italian architect who worked primarily under the fascist regime of Benito Mussolini and pioneered the Italian modern movement under the rubric of Rationalism. His most famous work is the Casa del Fascio built in Como, northern Italy, which was begun in 1932 and completed in 1936; it was built in accordance with the International Style of architecture and frescoed by abstract artist Mario Radice. In 1938, at the behest of Mussolini's fascist government and Società Dantesca Italiana President Rino Valdameri, Terragni designed the Danteum, an unbuilt monument to the Italian poet Dante Alighieri structured around the formal divisions of his greatest work, the Divine Comedy.

== Biography ==
Giuseppe Terragni was born to a prominent family in Meda, Lombardy. He attended the Technical College in Como then studied architecture at the Polytechnic University of Milan. In 1927 he and his brother Attilio opened an office in Como. They remained in practice until Giuseppe's death during the war years.

A pioneer of the modern movement in Italy, Terragni produced some of its most significant buildings. A founding member of the fascist Gruppo 7 and a leading Italian Rationalist, Terragni fought to move architecture away from neo-classical and neo-baroque revivalism. In 1926 he and other progressive members of Gruppo 7 issued the manifesto that made them the leaders in the fight against revivalism.

In a career that lasted only 13 years, Terragni created a small but remarkable group of designs; most of them were built in Como, which was one of the centers of the Modern Movement in Italy. These works form the nucleus of the language of Italian rationalist or modernistic architecture. Terragni was also one of the leaders of the artistic group called "astrattisti comaschi" with Mario Radice and Manlio Rho, one of the most important events in Italian Modern Art. He also contributed to the 1932 Exhibition of the Fascist Revolution.

In his last designs, Terragni achieved a more distinctive Mediterranean character through the fusion of modern theory and tradition.

His brother, Attilio, was the Fascist Podestà (mayor) of Como when the Casa del Fascio was commissioned, and his chief architectural patron was one of Mussolini's mistresses. His career was sidetracked by Italy's entry into World War II, where he was part of the Italian army sent to the Eastern Front. After the Italians collapsed near Stalingrad, Terragni produced drawings of the suffering around him and suffered a nervous breakdown. Terragni returned to Como where he died of thrombosis in 1943.

== See also ==
- Stripped Classicism

== Bibliography ==
- Dennis Doordan (1988). Building Modern Italy. New York: Princeton Architectural Press.
- Peter Eisenman (2003). Giuseppe Terragni: Transformations, Decompositions, Critiques. New York: The Monacelli Press.
- Muriel Emmanuel (1980). Contemporary Architects. New York: St. Martin's Press. ISBN 0-312-16635-4. NA680.C625 1980.
- David Rifkind (2012). The Battle for Modernism: Quadrante and the Politicization of Architectural Discourse in Fascist Italy. Vicenza and Venice: Centro Internazionale di Studi di Architettura Andrea Palladio and Marsilio Editori. ISBN 8831713485.
- Thomas L. Schumacher (1991). Surface and Symbol: Giuseppe Terragni and the Architecture of Italian Rationalism. New York: Princeton Architectural Press.
- Thomas L. Schumacher (1996). The Danteum, New York: Princeton Architectural Press.
- Dennis Sharp (1991). The Illustrated Encyclopedia of Architects and Architecture. New York: Quatro Publishing. p. 152. ISBN 0-8230-2539-X. NA40.I45 1991.
- Luigi Zuccoli (2015). Quindici anni di vita e di lavoro con l'amico e maestro architetto Giuseppe Terragni (2nd ed.). Melfi: Libria. ISBN 9788867640614.
- Arch. Terragni Giuseppe. Fascismo – Architettura – Arte / Arte fascista web site (archived on October 2, 2023).
