= AmadeoLab =

Research institute in Milan, Italy

- Established: 2008
- Mission: Cancer research and prevention
- President: Marco Luigi Votta (IRCCS Tumors Institute) Andrea Gambini (IRCCS Carlo Besta)
- Key people: G. Apolone (IRCCS Tumors Institute's Scientific Director) G. Lauria Pinter (IRCCS Carlo Besta's Scientific Director)
- Address: Via Amadeo 42, 20133
- Location: Milan, Italy
- Coordinates: 45.47098°N 9.23364°E
- Interactive map of AmadeoLab
- Website: https://www.istitutotumori.mi.it/ https://www.istituto-besta.it/

AmadeoLab is an Italian research institute based in Milan, Italy. The lab is a public hospital, currently representing the headquarters of the IRCCS National Cancer Institute (INT). and of the Neurological Institute "Carlo Besta". The building is made up of seven floors which contain all the medical, administrative and research departments. The Institute performs tests to prevent and diagnose potential oncological illnesses, and provides appropriate medical care and assistance for their treatment.

== Location ==
The institute is located in Via Giovanni Antonio Amadeo 42, 20133 Milan (Italy). AmadeoLab is situated near Ortica, part of the municipality of Lambrate, a district in the North-Eastern part of Milan, in Zone 3 of Milan. The main building of the IRCCS National Cancer Institute is located in Via Giacomo Venezian 1, adjacent to the departments of Milan University (Università degli Studi di Milano). Since its establishment, the National Institute of Tumors collaborated with several Italian Universities, creating a strong connection between research and their clinics. The same ideology characterizes Carlo Besta's Institute, whose main building is situated in the middle of the Città Studi district Via G. Celoria 11, 20133 Milano MI.

== Name ==
Amadeolab was named after the street in Milan where the laboratory is located. Giovanni Antonio Amadeo was an Italian sculptor, engineer, and architect of the 15th century. Amadeo was born in Pavia in 1447 and was commissioned for numerous works from an early age, including the completion of the funeral chapel of Bartolomeo Colleoni in Bergamo. Amadeo is also well known for carving the Certosa di Pavia, where he created most of the bas-reliefs of the right side of the facade and for collaborating in the construction of Milan Cathedral. During the last period of his life, he dedicated himself to the construction of the facade of Lugano Cathedral.

== History ==
=== Before AmadeoLab ===
Before 1994, the Institute in via Amadeo 42 was one of the main sites of the company Siemens, a company specialized in the design and production of radiological and electromedical equipment. In 1971 Siemens merged with Gorla Siama, the most important Italian Institute of the second post-war period, and established Siemens Spa-Divisione Gorla Siama. In 1994 the Lab in Milan was declared inactive, causing great concern for the employees. Two years later, in 1996, the company was sold to the General Medical Merate (GMM). The new company subsequently transferred its production from Milan (in via Amadeo) to Seriate (in the province of Bergamo).

==== Siemens ====
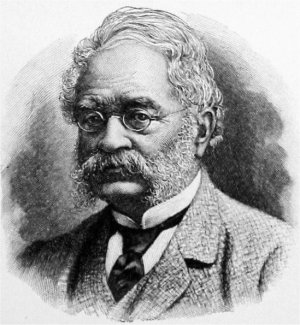
Ernst Werner von Siemens, the founder of Siemens

Siemens was founded in 1847, in a back courtyard in the city of Berlin. The founders of the company, Ernst Werner Siemens, his cousin Johann Georg Siemens and Johann Georg Halske, designed the industry to contribute to the technological innovation of Germany. The main focus was at first related to telegraphs and other electrical equipment, which made the Institution grow faster. In 1890 Siemens became a limited partnership, before turning into a limited liability company called Siemens & Halske AG. On 1 January 1899 Siemens opened its first Italian site in Milan and consequently Siemens started operating in other cities such as Genoa, Rome, Turin, La Spezia, Florence, Naples and Catania.

=== AmadeoLab today ===
After being closed for several years, the IRCCS National Cancer Institute bought the structure in via Amadeo 42 in 2008. The building was inaugurated on 15 September 2010 and it is still working today. AmadeoLab consists of 11 thousand square meters divided into several floors.

Floor	IRCCS National Cancer Institute	IRCCS Neurological Institute Carlo Besta
Basement	Biobank; High Technologies; Cryogenic Rooms	
Mezzanine	Department Directorate; Department Secretariate; Bioinformatics; Microscopy; ICT-Information and Communication Technology; Library; Meeting Rooms; Exit	Laboratories of Neuroimmunology (Neurology 4); Laboratory of Molecular Genetics and Neuromuscular Diseases (Neurology 4); Laboratory of Neurophysiology and Experimental Epileptology (Neurology 7); Laboratory of Morpho-Functional Study of Epileptogenic Encephalopathies and Neuronal Migration Disorders (Neurology 7); Laboratory of Genetics of Neurodegenerative and Metabolic Diseases (Analysis laboratory); Laboratory of Molecular Neurooncology (Neurology 8); Laboratory of Dementia Genetics and Biochemistry (Neurology 5)
First floor	UO10 Biomarkers; UO12 Molecular Targets; UO13 Chemoprevention; UO14 Molecular Pharmacology; Conference Hall; Cafeteria	Laboratory of Neuroepidemiology (Scientific Directorate); Researchers studios
Second	UO1 Molecular Mechanisms of Cell Cycle Control; UO2 Molecular Bases of Genetic Risk, Polygenic Models; UO3 Molecular Mechanisms; UO4 Predictive Medicine, Molecular Bases of Genetic Risk and Genetic Testing; UO7 Molecular Immunology; UO11 Molecular Therapies	
Third	Animal Stabularium	

==== IRCCS National Cancer Institute ====
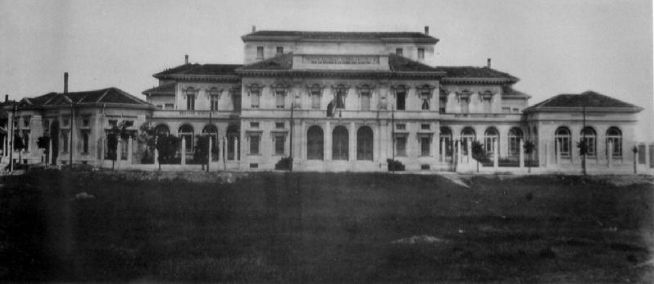
Front view of the Institute of Tumors, 1928 Milan (ca. 1928)

The National Cancer Institute was established in 1928, through the work of the well-known doctor and scientist, other than the Mayor of Milan, Luigi Mangiagalli. Even though the first wards of the hospital were inaugurated on 12 April 1928, the main building was actually opened to the public in 1968 and consisted of twelve floors used as surgical, medical research, and radiology departments. In 1978, on its 50th anniversary, the INT was inserted in a range of International Institutes of research. During 2006 the INT changed its denomination becoming a foundation under public law, the IRCCS Foundation. A new building was opened in 2012, to incorporate the laboratories and research facilities of the Department of Experimental Oncology and Molecular Medicine and of the Department of Preventive and Predictive Medicine. The new building also incorporated: the Tumoral Tissues Biobank of the Regional Oncology Network, opened 15 December 2012 and funded with 1.5 million euros provided by Fondazione Cariplo and Lombardy region; and, the Colon Cancer Biobank storage facility, to archive regional tumor samples for use in research due to its innovative freezer rooms. These maintain the temperature at −80 °C and include a special room provided with liquid nitrogen that freezes at −160 °C. INT is a national and international center for both common and rare cancers and participates internationally in research networks, organizations, and projects making with the best European Cancer Centers.

==== IRCCS Neurological Institute "Carlo Besta" ====
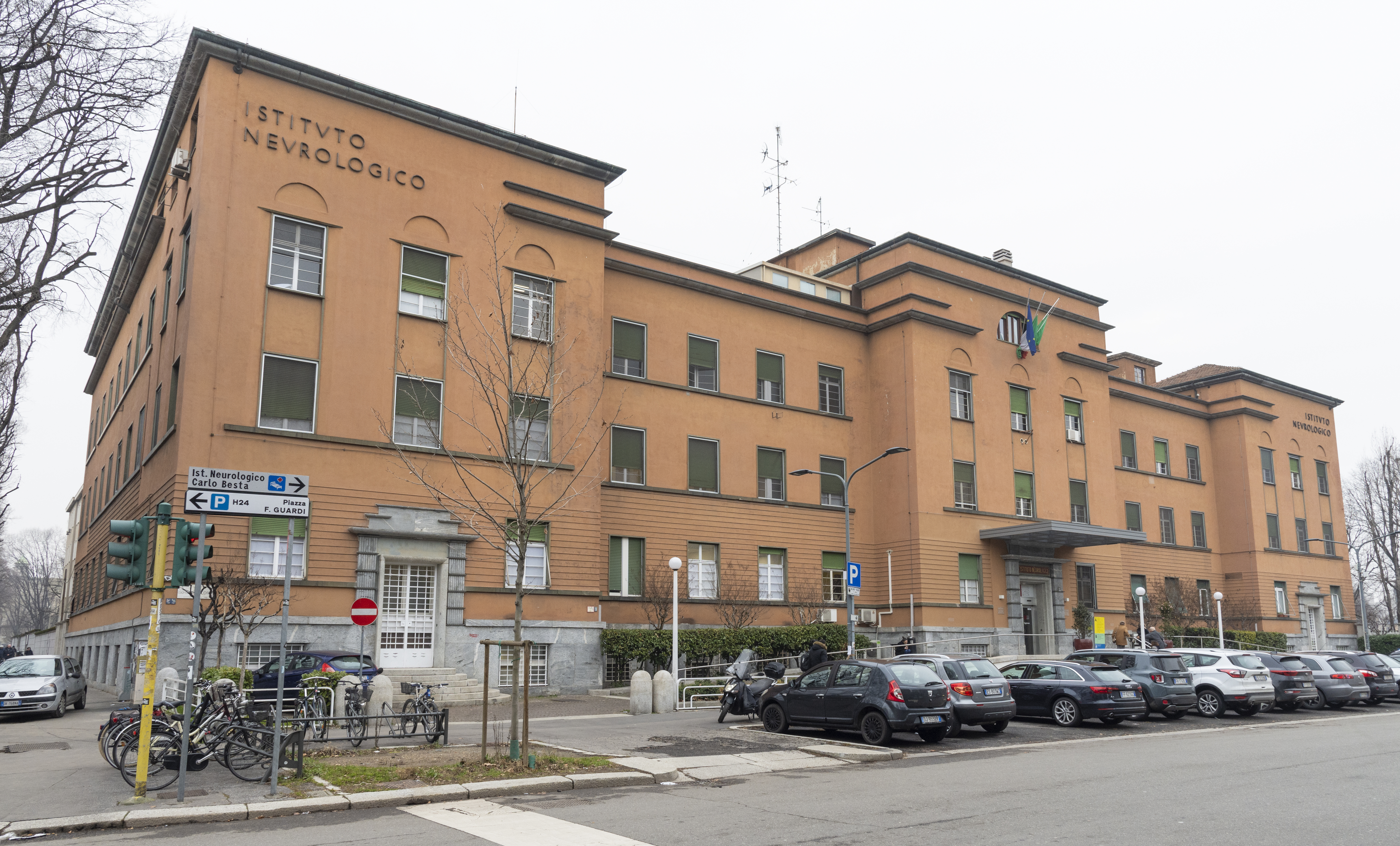
Carlo Besta Neurological Institute, Milan

Inside the laboratories in via Amedeo 42 there are numerous research centers for "Carlo Besta" Neurological Institute. The Institute "Carlo Besta" is an internationally recognized center in Neuroscience, which takes part in the World Health Organization project, International Network of Health Promoting Hospitals and Health Services. The Institute was founded in 1918 and has been classified since 1981 as a Scientific Institute of Medical Research. Some of the most important research laboratories are Epileptology and Experimental Neurophysiology. The main pathologies treated in the Institute are Epilepsy and Sleep Disturbances, other important laboratories inside the institute are the Neuroepidemiology held by the neurologist Alessandra Solari and the molecular neuro-oncology held by the neurologist Antonio Silvani. Other laboratory activities include the development and study of cellular and animal models for the understanding of disease mechanisms, and for the identification of experimental pharmacological and molecular therapies.

== Relevant researches ==
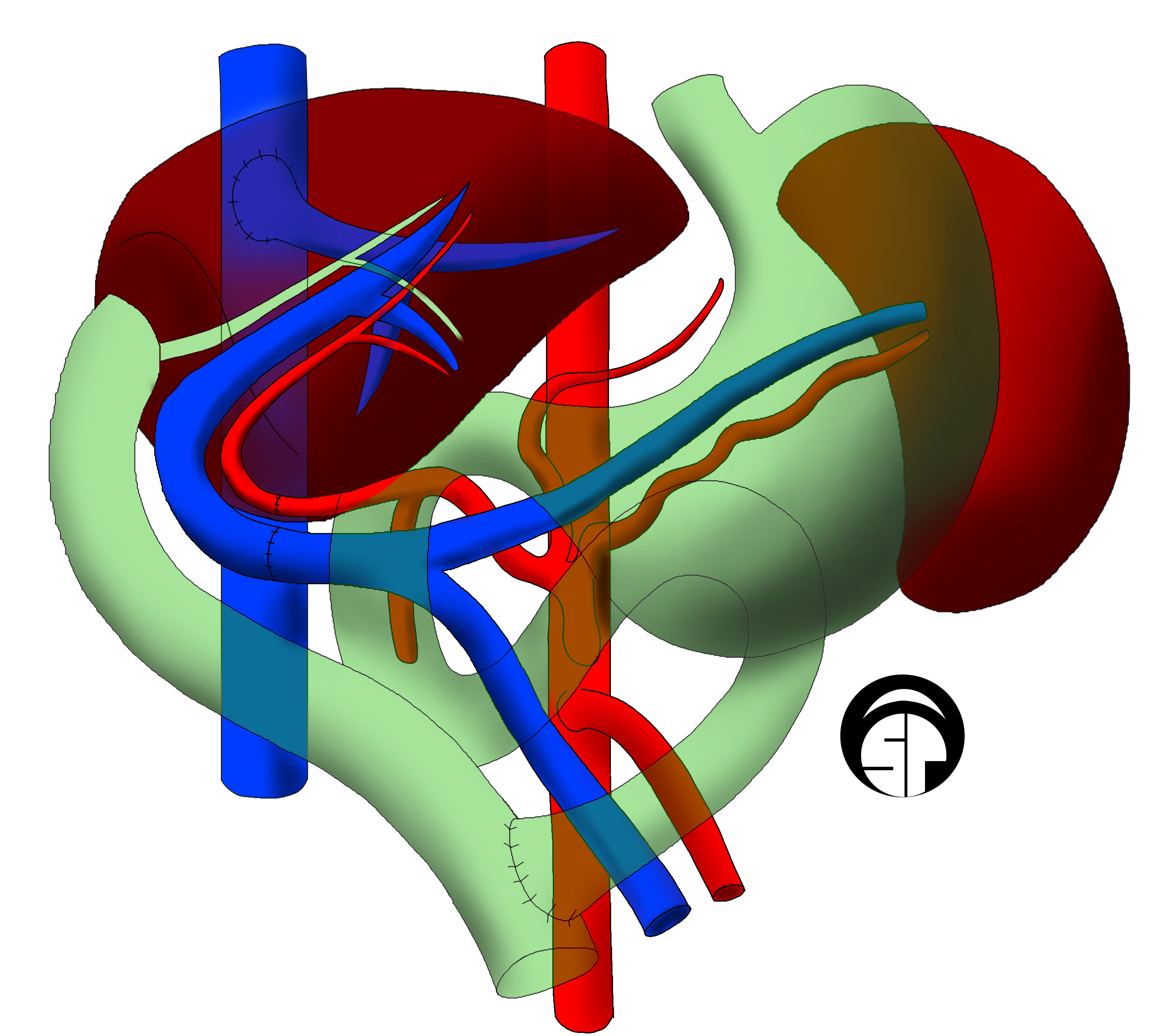
Left liver transplant

- In 2009, the INT (National Institute of Tumors) took care of roughly 14,000 inpatients, counted 10,000 day-hospital admissions and 1 million outpatient treatments. The institute performed 11,500 surgical operations among them 28 Liver transplantation. In the same year, it developed 70 trials of new therapies, and the researches published by the institute had great growth in the impact factor. It also inspired the Lombardy Oncology-Pathology Network (ROL). The opening of the AmadeoLab as part of the institute was crucial for a project directed by the INT.

The project aimed to establish a biobanking infrastructure, in order to investigate the procedures for quality controls in the field of Histology, specifically about tissue processing and the storing procedures. Their objective was to develop a hospital with a scientific data-based system.

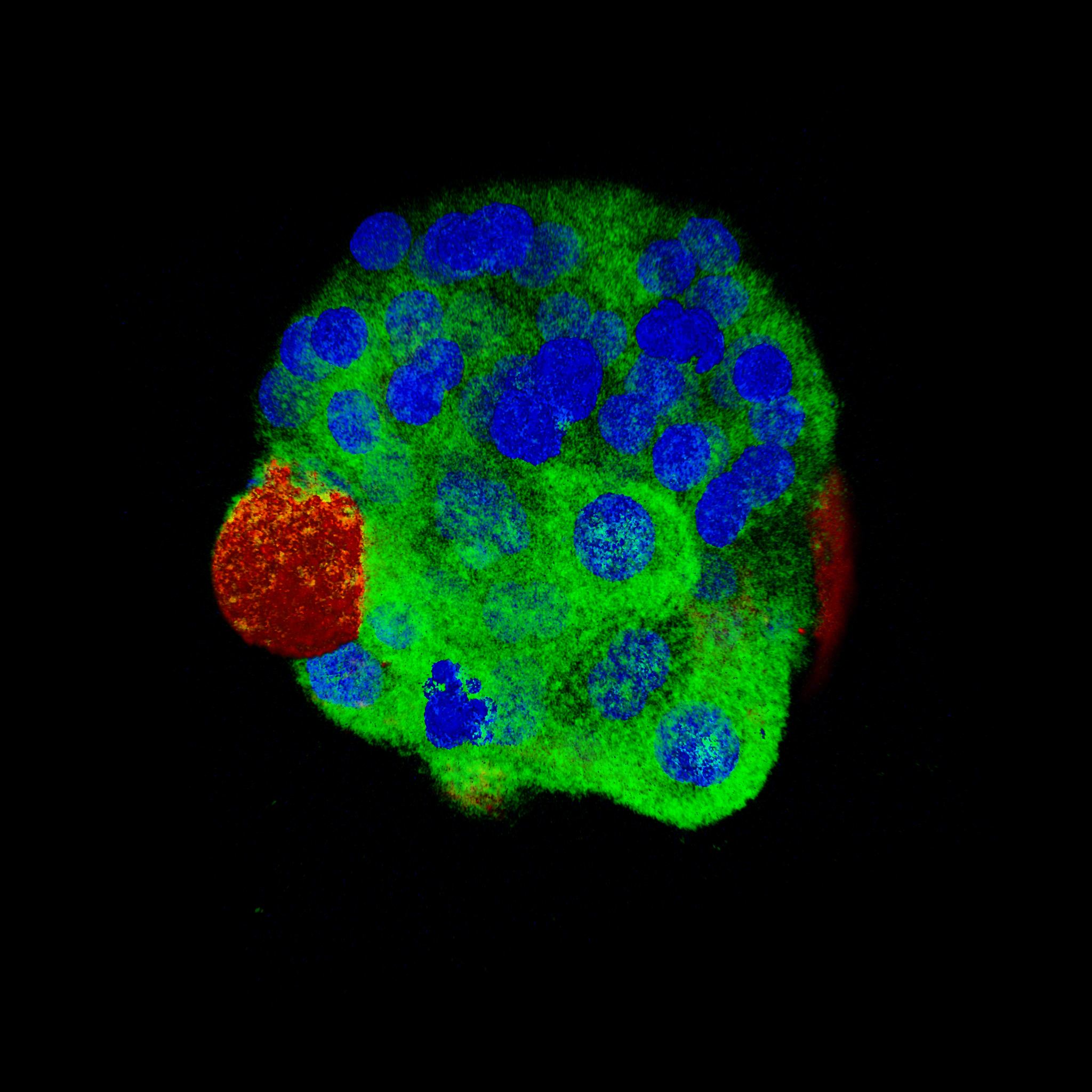
Breast tumor in 3D

* In 2011, research papers on the protein d16HER, and how it can develop cancer, were published. They carried out the research by experimenting on mice. Their studies led the researchers to conclude how d16HER in humans are likely to develop into a form of breast cancer

- In 2012, a study about dendritic cell was hosted. This research demonstrated that dendritic cells (DCs) are able to bring about Peripheral tolerance. The researchers aimed to demonstrate that when the Antigen is present, its presence is a peculiarity of all specialized DCs. It was proven that immature DCs present in the lymphatic system are unable to induce the conversion of autoantigen-specific regulatory T cell (iTreg). The local generation of iTreg cells is fundamental for the prevention of autoimmunity. This research was supported by the European Union FP7 Program, a Framework Programmes for Research and Technological Development, a funding for researches patronaged by the EU in 2007, aiming to enrich and improve the European Research Area.
- In 2013, a new phage display, called the Large Fragment Phage Display (LFPD) was used to track epitopes on targets. of LFPD in stopping conformational epitopes and developing a vaccine.

Trastuzumab emtansine

- In 2014, the research focused on the effects that a part of an isoform of the HER2 receptor that does not present the 16 exons (d16HER2). It's represented in some Her2-positive-breast cancer, showing how this particular exon can accelerate the mammary tumorigenesis and improve the response to the antibody trastuzumab.
- In 2018 Amadeolab has contributed to the publishment of fundamental researches regarding the efficiency of new cancer therapies. After having analysed primary glioma-delivered cells grown as neurospheres (GBM-NS) as a tumour model, the studies have shown how the sulfate Proteoglycan 4 (CSPG4) in GBM is critical for tumor progression and metastasis.

There is a range of research types that the INT uses, including:

- Basic (studies the cells of the tumors)
- Translational (middle step from basic to clinical)
- Clinical (experimentations)
- Epidemiological (studies the development of cancer)
- Standard of living of the patients (communication with patients and families)
- Special Projects (5x1000)

=== Current research ===
Since 2009, the Institute's production and scientific research is growing and clinical trials have increased. Currently, the clinicians in the institute are performing research in the field of epilepsy with the model ADNFLE which reproduces the main features of epilepsy. The goal is through neuroanatomical and biochemical methods, to analyze the protein alpha-synuclein, which is fundamental for the body to function normally, and it is often connected with Parkinson's disease. This research is also being done on post-surgical and post-mortem patients with Parkinson's disease and patients with different types of epilepsy. Professor Alida Amadeo, professor in human anatomy, is in charge of the research. The institute is performing over 176 research projects, and it is publishing approximately 400 scientific papers per year.

== See also ==
- Oncology
- Fondazione Cariplo
- Johann Georg Halske
- Giovanni Antonio Amadeo
- Cancer
