= Boyton =

Boyton may refer to:

== Places in England ==
- Boyton, Cornwall
- Boyton, Suffolk
- Boyton, Wiltshire

== People ==
- Ian Boyton (born 1974), English cricketer
- James Boyton (1855–1926), British estate agent and Conservative politician
- Paul Boyton (1848–1924), US showman and adventurer
- Rosemary Boyton, British immunologist
- An alternate spelling of the surname of the Hambledon Club cricketer John Bayton

== See also ==
- Boyton Cross
- Boyton End, Essex
- Boyton End, Suffolk
