= Boyton End =

Boyton End may refer to:

- Boyton End, Essex, England
- Boyton End, Suffolk, England
