= Ortica =

Coordinates: 45.470974°N 9.242399°E

- Quartier of Milan
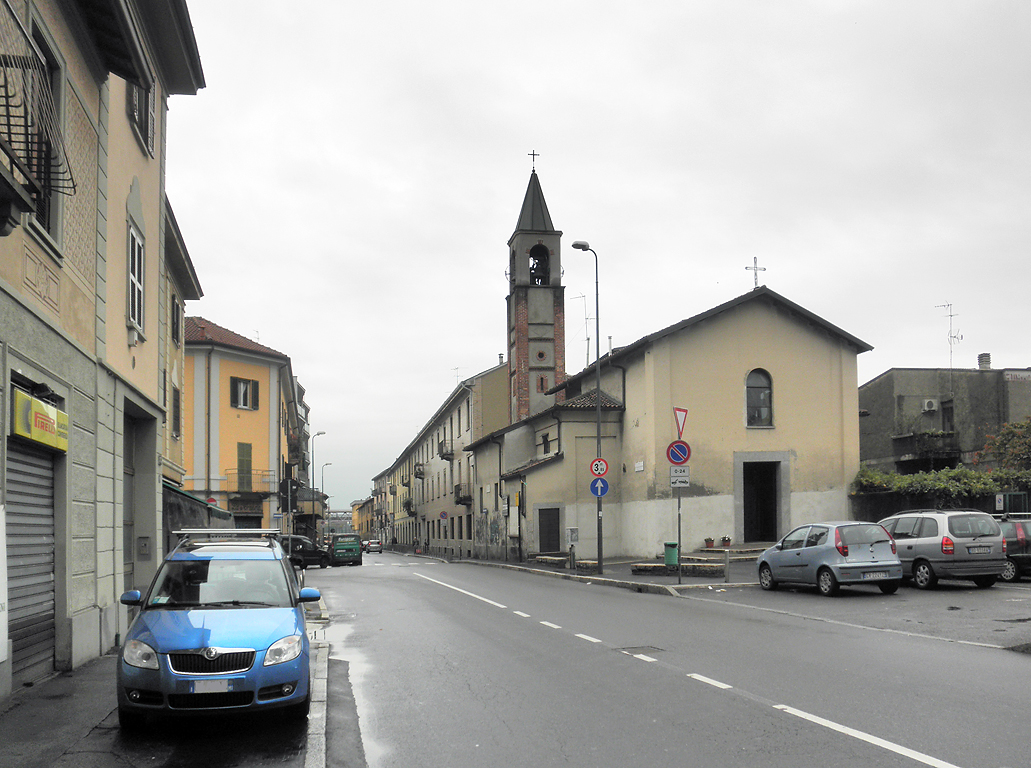

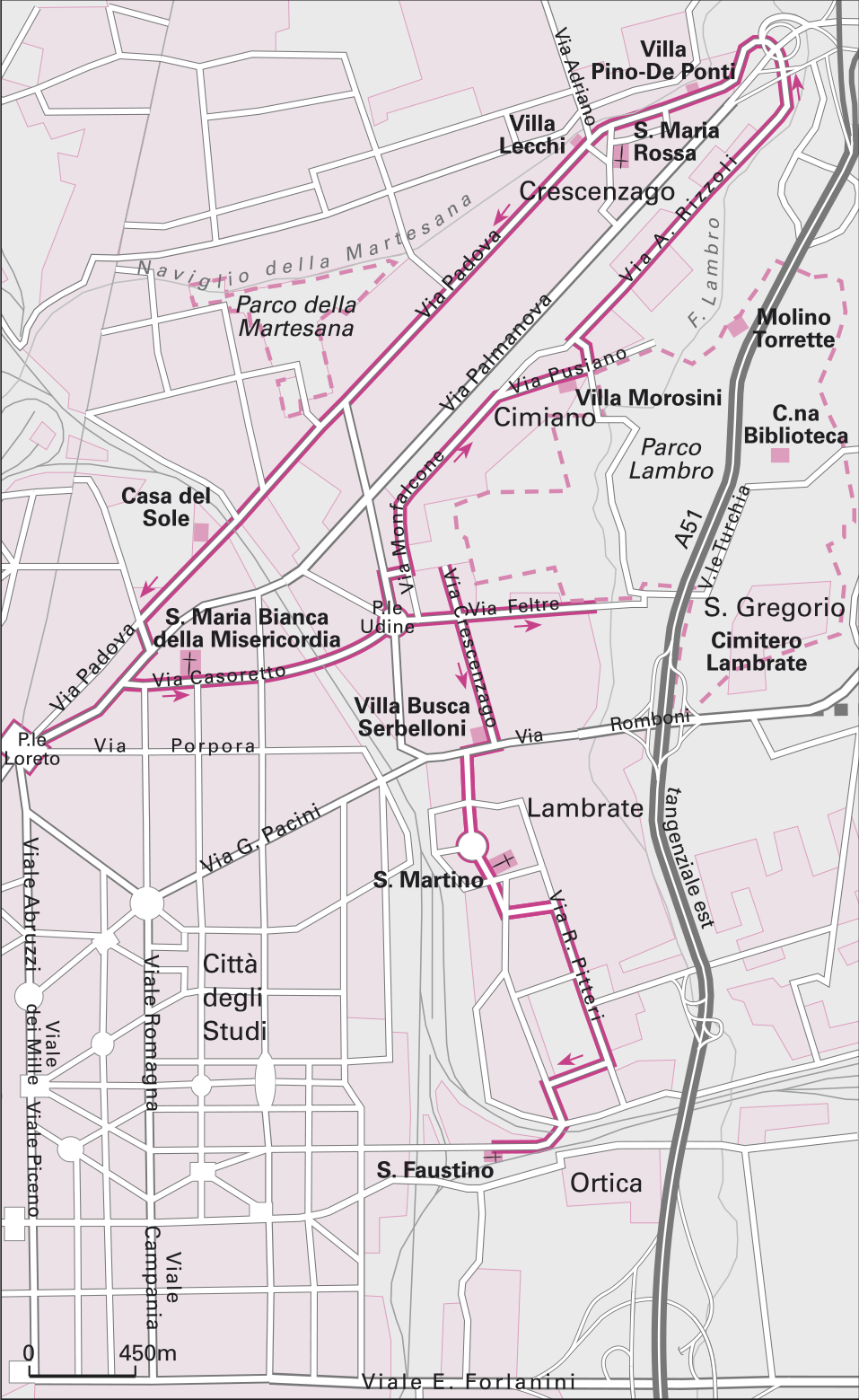
- Map of the neighborhoods of Milan: Lambrate, Ortica, and Crescenzago
- Country: Italy
- Region: Lombardy
- Province: Milan
- Comune: Milan
- Zone: 3
- Time zone: UTC+1 (CET)
  - Summer (DST): UTC+2 (CEST)

Ortica (Lombard: Ortiga [urˈtiːɡa]) is a district (quartiere) of Milan, Italy, located within the Zone 3 administrative division. The district used to be a frazione of Lambrate when the latter was an autonomous comune; after Lambrate was annexed to Milan, in 1923, Lambrate and Ortica came to be referred to as distinct districts.

The name Ortica comes from orto, referring to a small market garden, as the river Lambro, traversing both Lambrate and Ortica, has been long used for the irrigation of small cultivated areas.

Ortica housed a railway station, called Stazione di Lambrate, from 1896 to 1931; the station was later moved to another location in Lambrate proper (now Lambrate district), following a redesign of railway tracks around the city.

Enzo Jannacci, the famous Milanese singer-songwriter, mentions Ortica in his song Faceva il palo ("he was the lookout"), dedicated to some "Gang of the Ortica" (banda dell'Ortica).

The deindustrialization that began in the 1990s significantly transformed the working-class neighborhood, which nonetheless managed to maintain its vibrant local identity. This resilience is evident in the conversion of the former Ginori factory into a large residential complex with around 500 lofts, serving as homes, artist studios, and spaces for culinary and gastronomic endeavors.

Another major initiative started in 2015 involves the creation of 20 large murals as part of the Or.Me. project, which narrate the neighborhood's history and memory. The project continues to expand and has also inspired independent street artists. One of the latest murals, completed in 2023, is the "Mural of Rights," a tribute to 200 extraordinary individuals who have challenged social norms and made significant contributions to human and civil rights.
