= Kendall Smith =

American medical scientist and academic

Kendall A. Smith
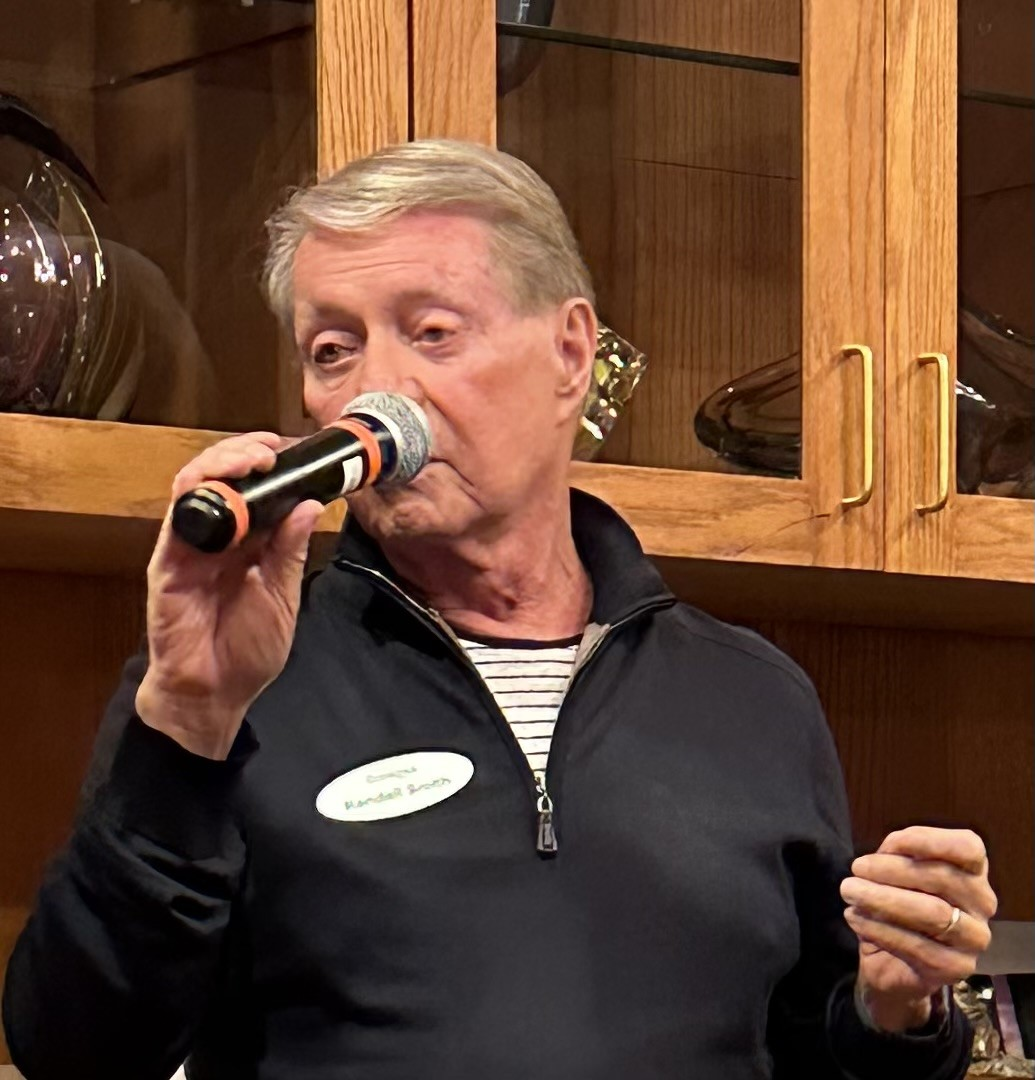
- Born: Akron, Ohio, U.S.
- Education: Denison University; Ohio State University College of Medicine
- Known for: Research on interleukins
- Scientific career
- Fields: Immunology

Kendall A. Smith is an American medical scientist best known for his work on interleukins, the regulatory molecules of the immune system, which has led to many of the new present-day therapies for immunological disorders, transplant rejection, infectious diseases and cancer. Smith is a Professor Emeritus of Medicine at Weill Cornell Medicine.

== Early life ==
Kendall Arthur Smith was born in Akron, Ohio, where he grew up as the second child of Robert Lyman Smith and Juanita Murphy Smith. He attended Fairlawn Primary School, Simon Perkins Junior High School followed by Buchtel High School in Akron, graduating in 1960.

== Medical and scientific training ==
Smith graduated from Denison University, Granville, Ohio with a B.S. in biology (1964). He graduated summa cum laude from the Ohio State University College of Medicine in 1968, then trained in Internal Medicine at Yale-New Haven Hospital (1968–1970). Smith then trained at the National Cancer Institute, Dartmouth Medical School and L’Institut de Cancerologie et d’Immunogenetique in Villejuif, France (1970–1974).

== Career ==
Smith joined the faculty of Dartmouth Medical School (Hanover, N.H.) as an Assistant Professor of Medicine in Hematology & Oncology in 1974, progressing to Associate Professor (1978) and Professor (1982). At the school, Smith focused his research on the immune system. By the 1970s, it had become clear that white blood cells are responsible for immune responses, but how these responses are initiated and regulated was not yet understood. The first molecularly defined T cell cytokine, interleukin-2 (IL-2), was originally described by Smith. His findings had a significant impact on immunology research and paved the way for the discovery of numerous humoral mediators of cell-mediated immunity. In groundbreaking research, Smith led a team that employed meticulous protein enrichment methods to purify TCGF (IL-2) to a state of purity and produce bioactive, biosynthetically radiolabeled TCGF. The introduction of radiolabeled TCGF/IL-2 allowed for an examination of its interaction with T cells, leading to a pivotal finding: the biological impacts of TCGF were facilitated by a high-affinity cytokine receptor that was selectively expressed on T cells activated through their T cell antigen receptor, thus underscoring the immune specificity of IL-2's effects.

In 1993, Smith moved to Weill Cornell Medicine in New York City to conduct clinical research in AIDS. There he served as the Chief of The Division of Immunology as well as the Co-Chair of the Immunology Program of The Graduate School of Biomedical Sciences, a joint program between Cornell and Sloan-Kettering Institute. He also served as the Director of The Tr-Institutional MD/PhD Program, a joint effort between Cornell, Sloan-Kettering and the Rockefeller University. Having extended his research to the clinic, by 1999, Smith established that low, physiological doses of interleukins could stimulate immune responses without toxicity.

In 2023, Smith published The Interleukin Revolution, a memoir recapping his career and research. Kirkus Reviews describes the book as a "fascinating look at a life in science, full of “eureka” moments and convoluted power plays" It notes that Smith's exposition is thorough and comprehensive, tracing the chronological evolution of his work from basic hypotheses to a detailed comprehension of molecular mechanisms. The writing style is praised for its balance, being sophisticated enough for scientists yet clear and straightforward for lay readers, and his descriptions of lab work are lauded for their vivid detail and down-to-earth prose.

== Publications ==
- Interleukin 2. Academic Press, Inc. 1988. ISBN 9780126514209.
- The Quantal Theory of Immunity: The Molecular Basis of Autoimmunity and Leukemia. World Scientific Publishing Co. Pte. Ltd. 2010. ISBN 9789814271752.
- Molecular Immunity: A Chronology of 60 Years of Discovery. World Scientific Publishing Co. Pte. Ltd. 2019. ISBN 9789813231702.
- The Interleukin Revolution. The Troy Bookmakers. 2023. ISBN 9781614687986.

== Honors and awards ==
- 1965 — Nu Sigma Nu Award for the Outstanding First year Medical Student
- 1966 — The Chauncy Leake Award
- 1967 — Alpha Omega Alpha honor society
- 1968 — Landacre Society – Student Research Honorary Society, President
- 1968 — Robert Nelson Watman Award for Outstanding Achievement in Research and Medicine
- 1968 — M.D. summa cum laude
- 1979 — Elected as Fellow to the American College of Physicians
- 1981 — Elected to the American Society for Clinical Investigation
- 1989 — Friedrich-Sasse Foundation Award
- 1993 — Denison University Alumni Citation Award
- 2009 — Alumni Achievement Award, The Ohio State University College of Medicine

== Journal articles ==
- The Long-Term Culture of Antigen-Specific T Cytotoxic T cells. Nature, 268:154-156, 1977.
- T Cell Growth Factor: Parameters of Production and a Quantitative Microassay for Activity. J. Immunol, 120:2027-32, 1978.
- The Functional Relationship of the Interleukins. J. Exp. Med. 151:1551-56, 1980.
- The Biochemical Characterization of the IL2 Molecule. Mol. Immunol. 18:1087-94, 1981.
- T Cell Growth Factor Receptors: Quantitation, Specificity and Biological Relevance. J. Exp. Med. 154: 1455–74, 1981.
- Production and Characterization of Monoclonal Antibodies to Interleukin 2: Strategies and Tactics. J. Immunol 131: 1808–15. 1983.
- The Interleukin T cell System: A New Cell Growth Model. Science. 224: 1312–16, 1984.
- The Interleukin 2 Receptor: Functional Consequences of its Bimolecular Structure. J. Exp. Med. 166: 1055–69. 1987.
- Differentiation of T Cell Lymphokine Gene Expression: The in vitro Generation of T Cell Memory. J. Exp. Med. 173:25-36. 1991.
- Isolation of Interleukin2-induced Immediate-Early Genes. PNAS. 90:2719-23. 1993.
- Rational Interleukin 2 Therapy for HIV-Positive Individuals: Daily Low Doses Enhance Immune Function Without Toxicity. PNAS. 93:10405-10, 1996.
- Therapeutic Use of IL2 to Enhance Antiviral T Cell Responses in vivo. Nature Med. 9:1-8, 2003.
- PD1 Combination Therapy with IL2 Modifies CD8+ T Cell Exhaustion. Nature. 610:173-81, 2022.
