= The Center for Study of Gene Structure and Function =

Consortium of scientific researchers

Coordinates: 40.7689°N 73.9650°W

The Center for Study of Gene Structure and Function (Gene Center) is a consortium of fifty-three researchers (twelve from minority groups underrepresented in the sciences). It is based at Hunter College in Manhattan. It focuses on cross-disciplinary and translational research by promoting dialogue and cooperation among scientists working in diverse biomedical research fields. It is funded by the Research Centers in Minority Institutions (RCMI) program of the National Center for Research Resources(NCRR) of the National Institute of Health (NIH) Since its establishment in 1985, the NIH has awarded the Gene Center over $38 million in federal grants.

The Gene Center participates in two primary collaboratory networks: Clinical and Translational Science Center (CTSC) and the RCMI Translational Research Network. The CTSC comprises New York City's Weill Cornell Medical College, Memorial Sloan-Kettering Cancer Center, Hospital for Special Surgery, and the Hunter-Bellevue School of Nursing. The CTSC builds collaborations between the partner institutions and community organizations to accelerate research from the laboratory into patient care, and to improve health outcomes in the community. The partnership was launched in September 2007 with a $49 million award from the National Institutes of Health (NIH). The RTRN is a coalition of 18 RCMI Programs across the United States. This network integrates clinical, biomedical, and behavioral researchers with health care providers and community leaders into geographically and ethnically diverse research partnerships aimed at improving patient outcomes in areas identified as national public health priorities.

The Gene Center also sponsors seminars, colloquia, and annual symposia and funds student researchers at the undergraduate, graduate and postdoctoral levels. This support includes translational research opportunities. These students, many of whom are minorities from national and international colleges and universities, have advanced to academic and professional appointments at institutions such as Hunter College, CUNY, George Washington University, Harvard, Johns Hopkins University, Albert Einstein College of Medicine, the Cancer Institute at Mount Sinai Hospital and National Institutes of Health.

== History ==
The Gene Center was founded in 1985 after the RCMI program was established by a Federal Mandate. The Congressional legislation was sponsored by Congressmen Louis Stokes and William Natcher. The Gene Center receives RCMI grant funds targeted for "enhancing the research capacity and infrastructure at minority colleges and universities that offer doctorates in health sciences." Because many investigators at RCMI institutions study diseases that disproportionately affect minorities, the program serves the dual purpose of bringing more minority scientists into mainstream research and enhancing studies of minority health. CUNY established the Center as an institute in 1988 to unite the efforts of CUNY chemists, biologists, and psychologists researching biomolecular structure, interactions and their effects on gene function.

The current Program Director is Dr. Robert Dottin.

== Mission and goals ==
Mission:

- To develop and prepare the next generation of American scientists, including minorities under-represented in the sciences
- To recruit and equip outstanding faculty, including minorities
- To develop shared core research facilities
- To implement strategies for scientific networking
- To build unique collaborations among biologists, chemists, biopsychologists, biophysicists, bioanthropologists and clinicians
- To transform basic research discoveries into clinical applications

Goals:

- Continue to increase and diversify the research faculty with emphasis on:
  - Recruitment of faculty historically underrepresented in the sciences
  - Mentoring of junior faculty to increase their competitiveness in acquiring extramural support and enhancing their visibility as researchers
  - Improve the research environment by increasing the contributions of postdoctoral fellows and graduate students in the research enterprise
- Sponsor complementary activities, such as colloquia, workshops and symposia
- Strengthen the research infrastructure
- Encourage and support students pursuing graduate study in biomedical research
- Participate in Translational Research with the Clinical Translational Science Center and with the RCMI Translational Research Network

== Awards and recognitions ==
The Gene Center and its members are widely acknowledged for their research and contributions to the scientific field.

Year	Gene Center Member	Award
2005	Dr. Derrick Brazill	Presidential Early Career Award for Scientists and Engineers (PECASE) after winning a 2004 Faculty Early Career Development (CAREER) Program award from the National Science Foundation (NSF) for his work on cell density sensing in Dictyostelium.
2002	Dr. Steven Greenbaum	Presidential Award for Excellence in Mathematics, Science, and Engineering Mentoring text
2001	Dr. Marie T. Filbin	Co-Recipient of the prestigious Ameritec Prize for Paralysis Research
1997	Dr. Jill Bargonetti	Presidential Early Career Award for Scientists and Engineers for Outstanding Cancer Biologist

== Members research areas and facilities ==
The fifty-three Gene Center researchers are also faculty members at Hunter College in the departments of Biology, Chemistry, Physics, Psychology, Anthropology, Urban Health and Social Work, and Mathematics and Statistics. The research fields of Gene Center members are:

- Bioinformatics
- Gene Expression and Signal Transduction
- Biomolecular Theory and Computer Graphics
- Nanotechnology
- Drug Design and Synthesis
- Molecular Immunology
- Cancer Research
- Neurobiology
- Biopsychology
- Drug and Protein Interaction with Nucleic Acids

There are 7 basic science and translational core research facilities available to Gene Center members and their collaborators and to the CUNY community:

- X-ray Diffraction
- Nuclear Magnetic Resonance
- Bioimaging
- Network
- Animal Care
- Flow Cytometry
- Internet2 Video-Conferencing

== Research programs ==
Hunter College offers several undergraduate, graduate, and postdoctoral research programs and fellowships. These programs give students access to the Gene Center's research laboratories and the resources of their mentors, collaborators and peers.

BRIDGES-to-the-Doctorate	Ronald E. McNair Post-Baccalaureate Achievement Program
Summer Program for Undergraduate Research (SPUR)	Minority Institutions' Drug Abuse Research Program (MIDARP)
Minority Access to Research Careers (MARC)	Minority Biomedical Research Support/Research Initiative for Scientific Enhancement (MBRS/RISE)
Howard Hughes Medical Institute Undergraduate Science Education Program	Louis Stokes Alliances for Minority Participation(LSAMP)
National Institute of Mental Health-Career Opportunities in Research Education and Training (NIMH-COR)	Biotechnology Workforce Training at Hunter College
Doctoral Program in Public Health	Gene Center Predoctoral Fellowship

== Events ==
Symposia	The Gene Center, along with its partners, hosts an annual International Symposium featuring speakers, including Nobel Laureates, and provides discussion on recent discoveries in biomedical research.
Seminars and Colloquia	Gene Center members propose topics for the seminars and colloquia. These meetings provide students and faculty with the opportunity to hear presentations by scientists from different universities across the nation and to network with peers and professionals.
Recruiting Conferences	The Gene Center participates in several annual national recruiting conferences including Annual Biomedical Research Conference for Minority Students (ABRCMS), Society for Advancement of Chicanos and Native Americans in Science (SACNAS), Society for Neuroscience (SfN), and National Organization for the Professional Advancement of Black Chemists and Chemical Engineers (NOBCChE). Representatives from the Gene Center attend these recruiting conferences to provide science students and professionals with information about the Gene Center, its programs and networking opportunities.

== Networking ==
Justgarciahill (JGH) is a virtual community for minorities in sciences committed to increasing the number of minorities entering science careers and to celebrating contributions to science by minority scientists. JGH strives to provide a supportive on-line environment that stimulates underrepresented minorities to pursue careers in science. The scientific content promotes the health of minority populations and addresses health disparity issues.
