= Mapei =

Italian construction materials company

- Native name: Mapei S.p.A.
- Type: Società per Azioni
- Industry: Chemical products for the building industry
- Founded: 1937; 89 years ago
- Founder: Rodolfo Squinzi
- Headquarters: 22 Via Cafiero, Milan, Italy
- Key people: Marco & Veronica Squinzi
- Products: Adhesives, sealants and chemical products for building
- Revenue: €4.4 billion (2025)
- Number of employees: 14,000 (2025)
- Website: www.mapei.com

Mapei S.p.A. (Italian pronunciation: [maˈpɛi]) is an Italian limited company founded in 1937 in Milan that manufactures chemical products for the building industry.

== History ==
=== Innovation and research ===
The company was founded and originally called Materiali Ausiliari per l'Edilizia e l'Industria (Auxiliary Materials for Building and Industry), before being renamed Auxiliary Materials for Building and Industry, by Rodolfo Squinzi, employing just seven members of staff. In the early days, it manufactured coloured paints and materials for buildings coverings.

It later focused on what was then a niche market, adhesives for floors and other surfaces, most notably for Linoleum surfaces, manufacturing an adhesive called ADESILEX L1. Next came adhesives for ceramics, stone materials, carpets, PVC and wood, manufacturing a specific adhesive for each product developed thanks to heavy investment, in terms of both financial and human resources, in research, which has always been part of the company's DNA. The market expanded in the 1960s, thanks to the worldwide popularity of Italian ceramics. ADESILEX P22 adhesive was launched in a ready-to-use pack that was revolutionary for the industry at that time, which traditionally prepared conventional cement-based mortars on-site. Manufacturing was then extended to include other special mortars, waterproofers and additives for concrete.

=== Internationalisation ===
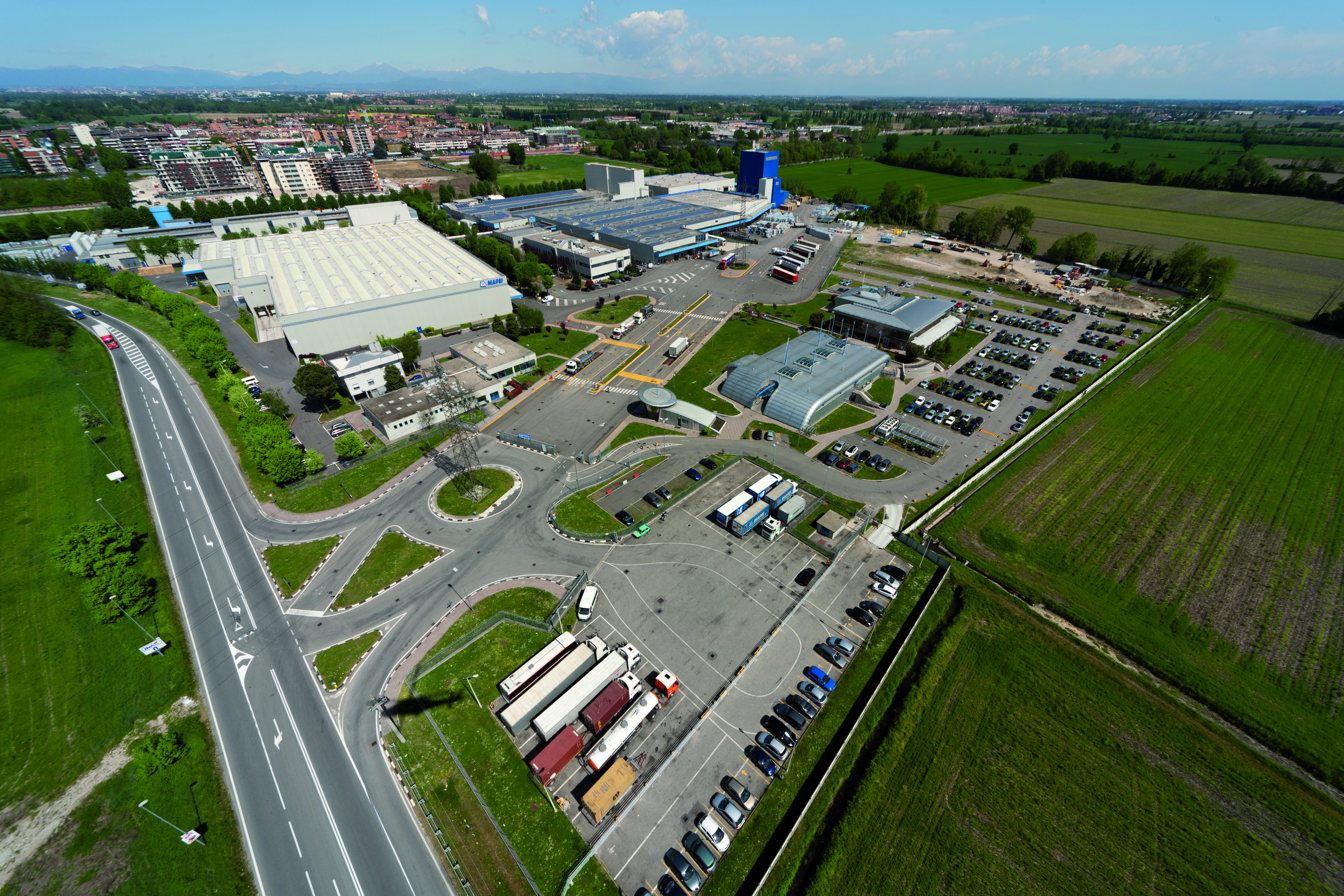
Mapei's Production Plant in Robbiano di Mediglia, Milan

In 1978, Giorgio Squinzi, a graduate in industrial chemistry, began internationalising the company, both commercially and in terms of production, by opening a small factory in Canada after supplying adhesives for installing the rubber surfaces used for the athletics tracks at the 1976 Olympics. Over the following decades the company expanded into Austria, United States, France and then the rest of the world, opening new branches and taking over other important brands, starting with Vinavil in Italy in 1994 and most recently culminating in its latest acquisition of Fili & Forme. This growth strategy is connected with the need to manufacture adhesives and chemical products for the building industry within a 400–500 km radius of building operations to keep transport costs sustainable.

Giorgio Squinzi, the Mapei Group's Managing Director, worked alongside his wife, Adriana Spazzoli, who was Director of Marketing & Communication. Their children, Marco and Veronica, now work for the company as, respectively, the Director of Research & Development and Director of Global Development. This multinational company is one of the world's leading manufacturers of adhesives and chemical products for the building industry with (figures for 2019) 90 subsidiaries in 56 countries operating through 83 manufacturing plants in 36 countries, each with its own quality control laboratory, and 31 research centres (including a corporate centre) in 20 countries. As at 2021, the company employs more than 11,000 staff and manufactures over 6,000 products for the building industry.

The Mapei Group has been publishing a two-monthly magazine in Italian and English since 1991. Adriana Spazzoli was the editor-in-chief of the magazine called Realtà Mapei for 28 years until 2019. 160,000 copies of the magazine are distributed all over Italy and 22,000 copies of Realtà Mapei International are published worldwide.

After Squinzi and Spazzoli died in 2019, their children, Marco Squinzi and Veronica Squinzi, took over the company as joint corporate CEO. Marco Squinzi, Veronica Squinzi and Simona Giorgetta are currently members of the board of directors that is chaired by the lawyer Laura Squinzi.

=== Projects ===
Over the years Mapei products have been used for installing athletics tracks at various Olympics after the Montréal games. They have also been used for repairing the corridors of the Sistine Chapel, installing floors in the main chamber of the Kremlin, and restoring Giotto's frescoes in St Francis of Assisi Basilica after it was damaged by an earthquake. They have also been used for the tunnel through Mont Blanc, the construction of the Twin Towers in Kuala Lumpur, the bridge connecting Denmark to Sweden, Three Gorges Dam in China, for constructing 240 km of tunnels serving the Tokyo-Osaka super train, for laying the floors of Hong Kong International Airport, repairing and constructing the track at the Kyiv Velodrome and for repairing the wooden structures of Basel Art Museum.

Mapei products have also recently been used to build the Panama Canal and Beijing-Daxing International Airport in China and to restore and subsequently extend La Scala Theatre in Milan. Mapei supplied additives for building the foundations of new Galeazzi Hospital in Milan and products for constructing the new bridge "For Genoa".

== Sport and culture ==
=== Mapei in sport ===
Mapei owns and sponsors Sassuolo Football Club, also supporting the women's team. After taking over the football club, Mapei then bought its own ground, Mapei Stadium – Città del Tricolore in Reggio Emilia, and more recently in 2019 opened a Sports Centre called Mapei Football Center in Ca' Marta, Sassuolo.

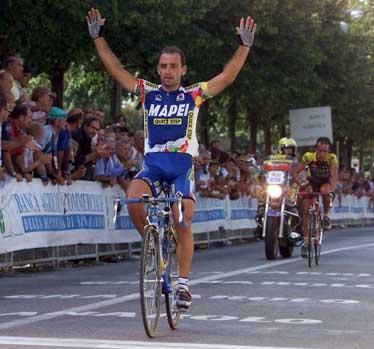
Paolo Bettini riding for Mapei cycling team in 2001

Before venturing into the world of football, Mapei's name was closely associated with road cycling sponsoring a professional cycling team from 1993 to 2002. The team would go onto become one the most dominant in history, winning the UCI team rankings in eight of the ten seasons it raced. The team was particularly dominant in one-day Classics Races. Its leading cyclists included: Tony Rominger, Pavel Tonkov, Andrea Tafi, Franco Ballerini, Paolo Bettini, Gianni Bugno, Óscar Freire, Johan Museeuw. In order to provide rational scientific support for its cycling team based on a proper ethical approach, Mapei Sports Research Centre was opened in Castellanza in 1996 (and later moved to Olgiate Olona) under the leadership of Professor Aldo Sassi. Its facilities include laboratories, clinics, and data analysis centres. The facilities are intended to promote the right approach to sport.

Mapei has also sponsored Reggiana Basketball Club and a women's team in Naples (Saces-Mapei-Givova Napoli).

=== Mapei in culture ===
The company is closely tied to La Scala Theatre in Milan. It officially became a "Corporate Subscriber" for the first time in 1984 and then, after contributing to the rebuilding and renovation of the theatre, it became a "Founding Partner" in 2008. Giorgio Squinzi joined the board of directors in 2016. Mapei is also a "Founding Member" of Santa Cecilia National Academy in Rome.

Mapei supports No'hma Theatre Space, which has hosted art projects organised and promoted by the association of the same name since 2000. This theatre, founded by Teresa Pomodoro, is located where the old 'drinking water building' used to stand in via Orcagna in the Città Studi neighbourhood. Mapei also sponsors the Verdi Orchestra and La Triennale Foundation in Milan.

Mapei is also linked to Milan through a business partnership with the Leonardo da Vinci National Museum of Science and Technology as a technical partner for various exhibition areas. It was also involved in restructuring the theatre in C. Beccaria Correctional Institute for Young Offenders.

== Shareholders ==
The firm is controlled by Emme Esse Vi s.r.l., the holding company owned by the Squinzi family which has 93.95% of the shares; Mapei itself holds the remaining 6.05%.

== Financial and economic figures ==
At the beginning of the 1990s, Mapei employed 500 staff. That number had risen to 4679 by 2006, including 906 employed by the holding company (that same year the Mapei Group had consolidated invested capital of approximately €953.9 million and a net worth of approximately €387.6 million, consolidated revenue of €1.18 billion and net consolidated profits of approximately €59.4 million). In 2012 Mapei was the third biggest Italian chemical industry after Versalis and the Mossi & Ghisolfi Group. It now employed 7,500 staff at over 58 factories in 28 countries. In 2017 that figure had risen to almost 10,000. Its consolidated revenue in 2018 was €2.4 billion and it now employed over 10,000 staff worldwide.

To celebrate the company's 80th anniversary in 2017, Giorgio Squinzi announced that Mapei had never made a loss any year in its entire corporate history. It had never furloughed staff or made anybody redundant to reduce its workforce.

Its consolidated income in 2019 was €2.8 billion employing 10,500 staff worldwide.

== See also ==
- List of Italian companies
