= Porta Monforte =

Coordinates: 45°28′04″N 9°12′23″E

- Quartiere of Milan
- Interactive map of Porta Monforte
- Country: Italy
- Region: Lombardy
- Province: Milan
- Comune: Milan
- Zone: 3
- Time zone: UTC+1 (CET)
  - Summer (DST): UTC+2 (CEST)

Porta Monforte is a district ("quartiere") of Milan, Italy, located within the Zone 3 administrative division. It is named after the eponymous city gate, which was added in the 1890s to the existing Spanish walls of the city. The gate was meant to serve as a customs office; the tax booths were designed by Luigi Tormenti and completed in 1889. While the addition of the Monforte city gate was intended to absorb part of the traffic going through Porta Venezia and Porta Vittoria, Porta Monforte remained a minor gate. The gate itself has since been demolished; it was located in what is now Piazza del Tricolore ("Tricolour Square").

Porta Monforte was the scene of some of the most dramatic events in the Milan riots of 1898, when the Italian army's artillery bombed a local monastery, killing hundreds of beggars that were standing in line to receive assistance and food.

== See also ==
Bava Beccaris massacre
