= Zone 3 of Milan =

Coordinates: 45.482506°N 9.241047°E

Zone 3 of Milan Municipality 3
- Municipality of Milan
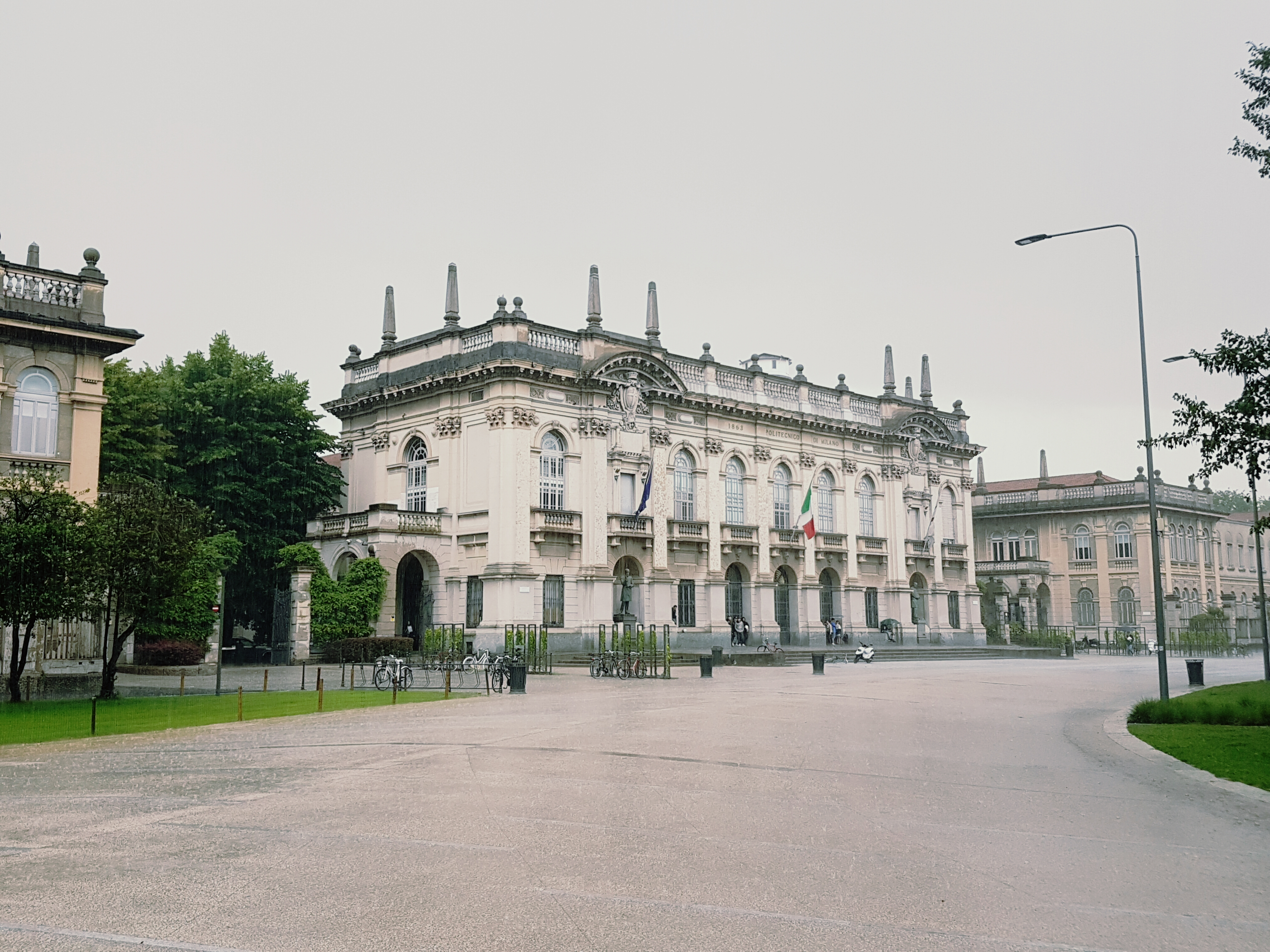
- Polytechic University headquarter

- Location of Zone 3 of Milan
- Country: Italy
- Region: Lombardy
- Province: Metro City of Milan
- Comune: Milan

Government
  - President: Caterina Antola (PD)

Area
  - Total: 5.49 sq mi (14.23 km^{2})

Population (2022)
  - Total: 142,726
- Time zone: UTC+1 (CET)
  - Summer (DST): UTC+2 (CEST)

The Zone 3 of Milan, since 2016 officially Municipality 3 of Milan, (in Italian: Zona 3 di Milano, Municipio 3 di Milano) is one of the 9 administrative divisions of Milan, Italy.

It was officially created as an administrative subdivision during the 1980s. On 14 April 2016, in order to promote a reform on the municipal administrative decentralization, the City Council of Milan established the new Municipality 3, a new administrative body responsible for running most local services, such as schools, social services, waste collection, roads, parks, libraries and local commerce.

The zone lies on the north-eastern part of the city. A significant part of its area is occupied by universities campuses of Studies' City (in Italian: Città Studi).

== Subdivision ==
The zone includes the following districts:

- Casoretto, which is the northernmost district of the zone, mainly residential;
- Cimiano, which was an autonomous comune until it was annexed to Crescenzago in 1757 and then to Milan in 1923. It houses the headquarter of Rizzoli publishing group;
- Città Studi, seat of many universities campuses. It houses the Polytechic University headquarter, all the scientific departments of the University of Milan and play fields of the University Sports Centre. Due to its function is also considered a student residential district. The district also houses several prominent hospitals, including the IRCCS National Cancer Foundation and the Carlo Besta Neurological Institute;
- Lambrate, an autonomous comune until it was annexed to Milan in 1923. It houses one of the major railway stations of Milan. The district is also well known for Parco Lambro, a large urban park established in 1934. The famous Lambretta motor scooter was manufactured here;
- Ortica, former frazione of Lambrate, it housed the railway station from 1896 to 1931;
- Porta Monforte, amed after the eponymous city gate, which was added in the 1890s to the existing Spanish walls of the city. The gate was meant to serve as a customs office; the tax booths were designed by Luigi Tormenti and completed in 1889. While the addition of the Monforte city gate was intended to absorb part of the traffic going through Porta Venezia and Porta Vittoria, Porta Monforte remained a minor gate. The gate itself has since been demolished; it was located in what is now Piazza del Tricolore ("Tricolour Square"). It was the scene of some of the most dramatic events in the Milan riots of 1898, when the Italian army's artillery bombed a local monastery, killing hundreds of beggars that were standing in line to receive assistance and food;
- Feltre, mainly comprises large apartment blocks, built in the late 1950s with state subsidies. The leading architects involved in the realization of this residential area were Luciano Baldessari, Giancarlo De Carlo, Ignazio Gardella and Angelo Mangiarotti, supervised by Gino Pollini. Two main types of apartment blocks were realized, respectively 4-floor and 9-floor high. The 4-floor buildings are located in the centre of the district, where most shops and public services are found, while the taller buildings are located on the district's perimetry;
- Rottole.

== Government ==
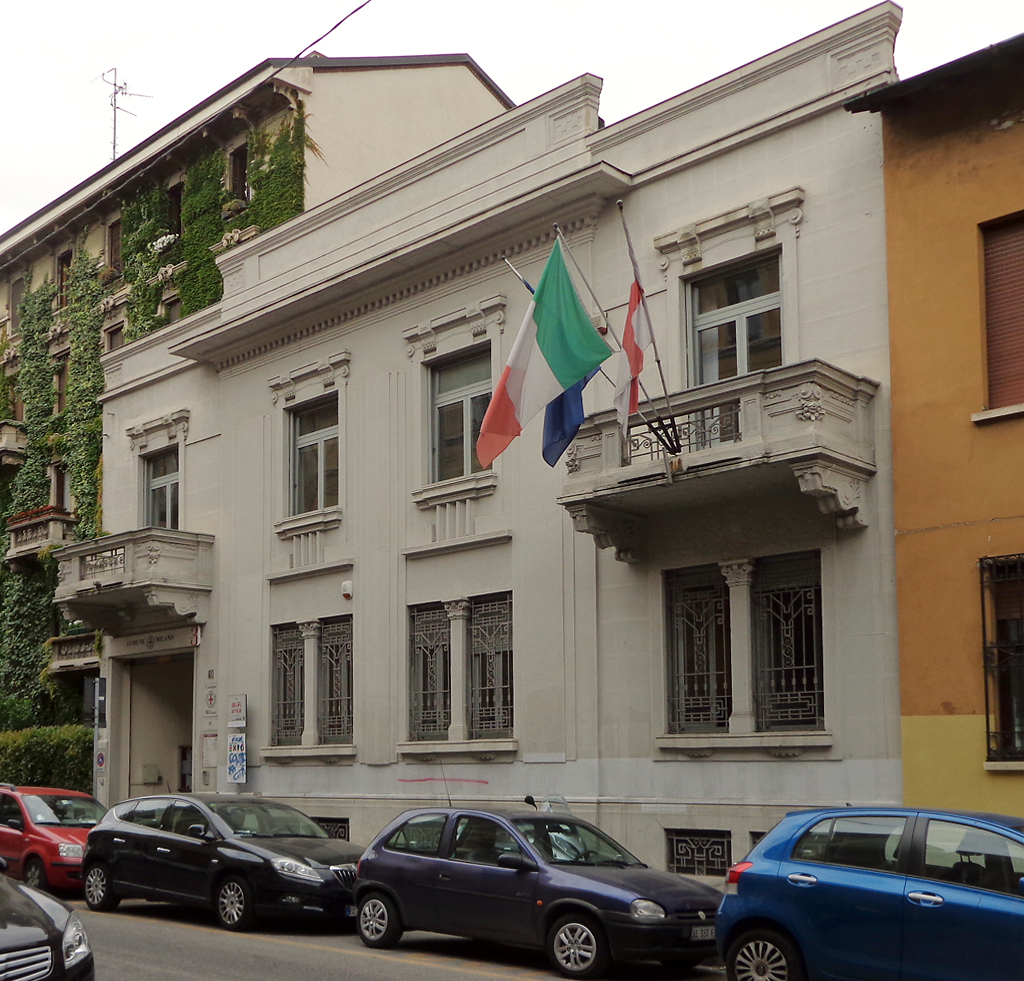
The seat of the Municipal Council.

The area has its own local authority called Consiglio di Municipio (Municipal Council), composed by the President and 30 members directly elected by citizens every five years. The Council is responsible for most local services, such as schools, social services, waste collection, roads, parks, libraries and local commerce in the area, and manages funds (if any) provided by the city government for specific purposes, such as those intended to guarantee the right to education for poorer families.

The President is Caterina Antola (PD), elected on 5 June 2016 and re-elected on 3-4 October 2021.

Here is the current composition of the Municipal Council after 2021 municipal election:

Alliance or political party	Members		Composition
Alliance or political party	2021–2026		Composition
Centre-left (PD-EV)	21	21 / 30	
Centre-right (FI-L-FdI)	9	9 / 30	

Here is a full lists of the directly-elected Presidents of Municipio since 2011:

President	Term of office		Party
Renato Sacristiani	16 May 2011	27 June 2016	PRC
Caterina Antola	27 June 2016	Incumbent	PD

== Transport ==
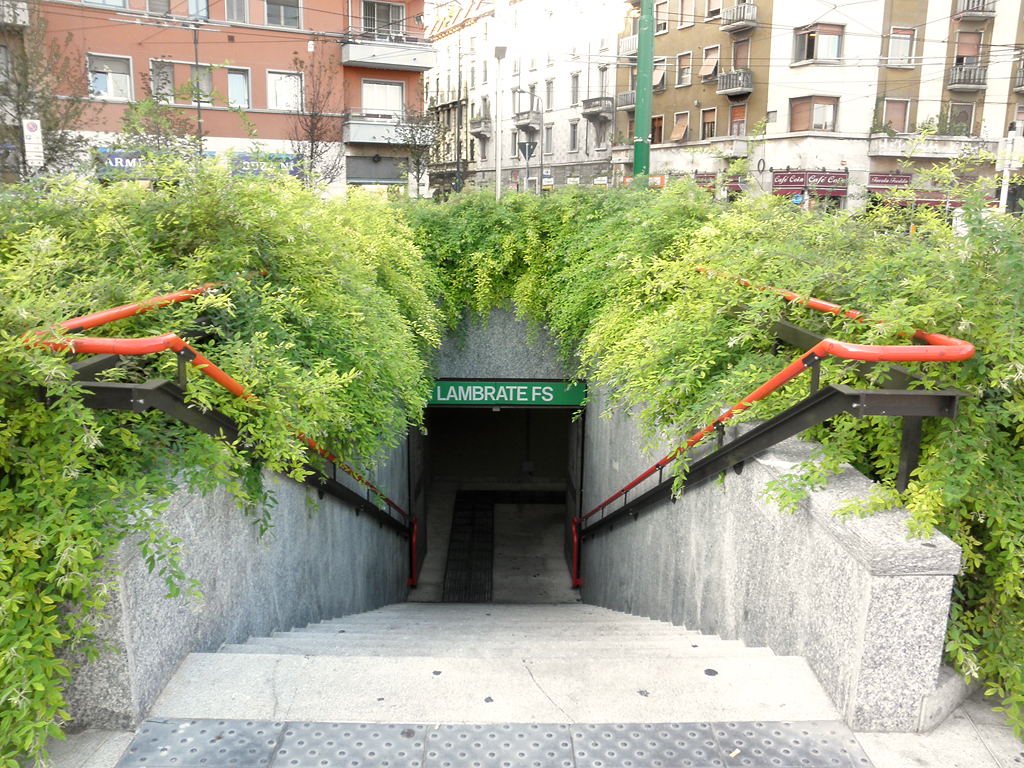
M2 Lambrate FS station entrance.

Stations of Milan Metro in Zone 3:

- Lima, Loreto, Porta Venezia;
- Caiazzo, Cascina Gobba, Cimiano, Crescenzago, Lambrate FS, Loreto, Piola, Udine.
- Argonne, Dateo, Susa.

Suburban railway stations in the Zone 3:

- Milano Lambrate
- Milano Porta Venezia
- Milano Dateo

== Other notable places ==
- Milano Lambrate railway station
- Lambro Park
- Maserati Park
- Politecnico di Milano

== Gallery ==
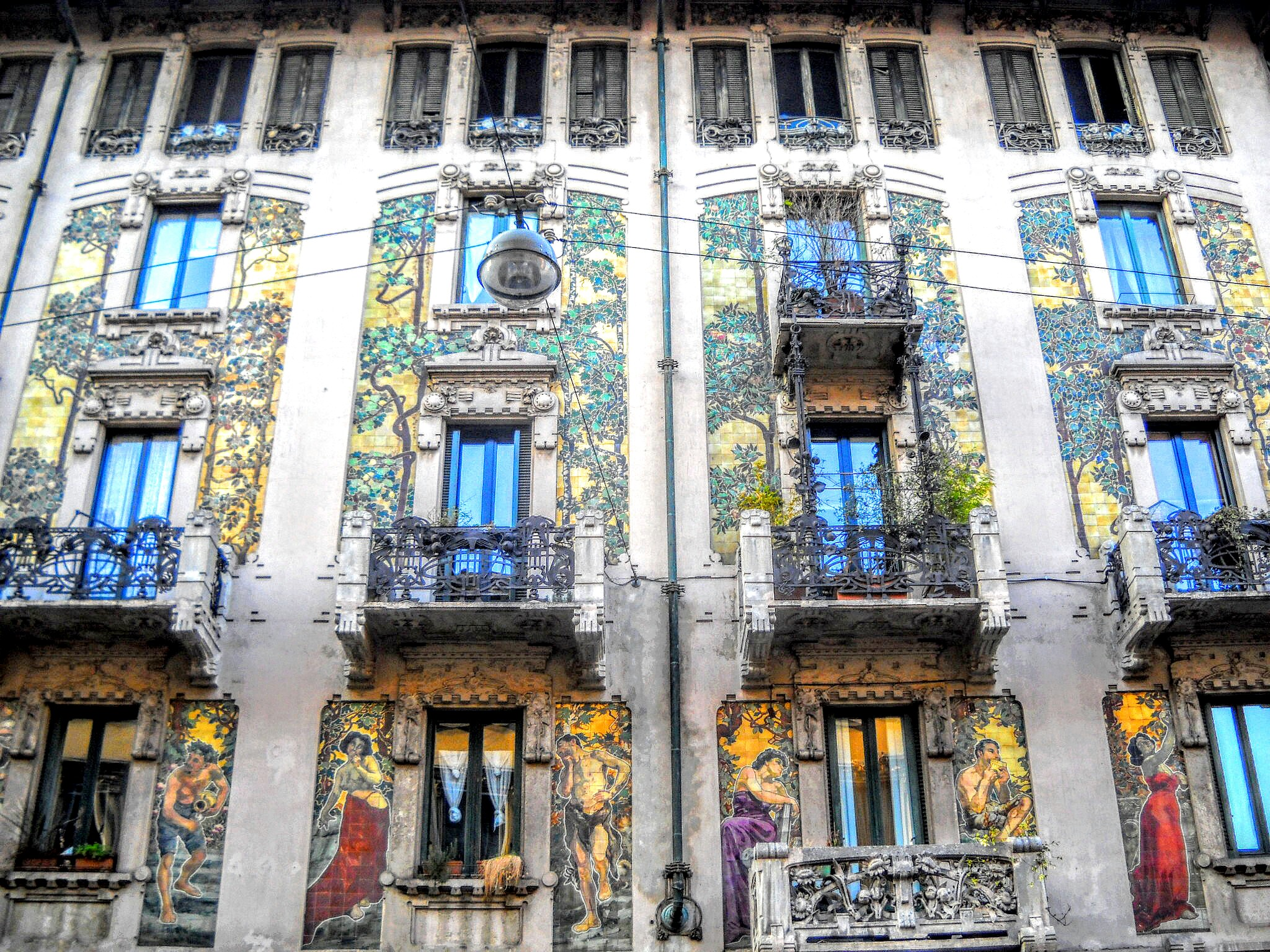
Casa Galimberti, typical example of Italian Liberty architecture

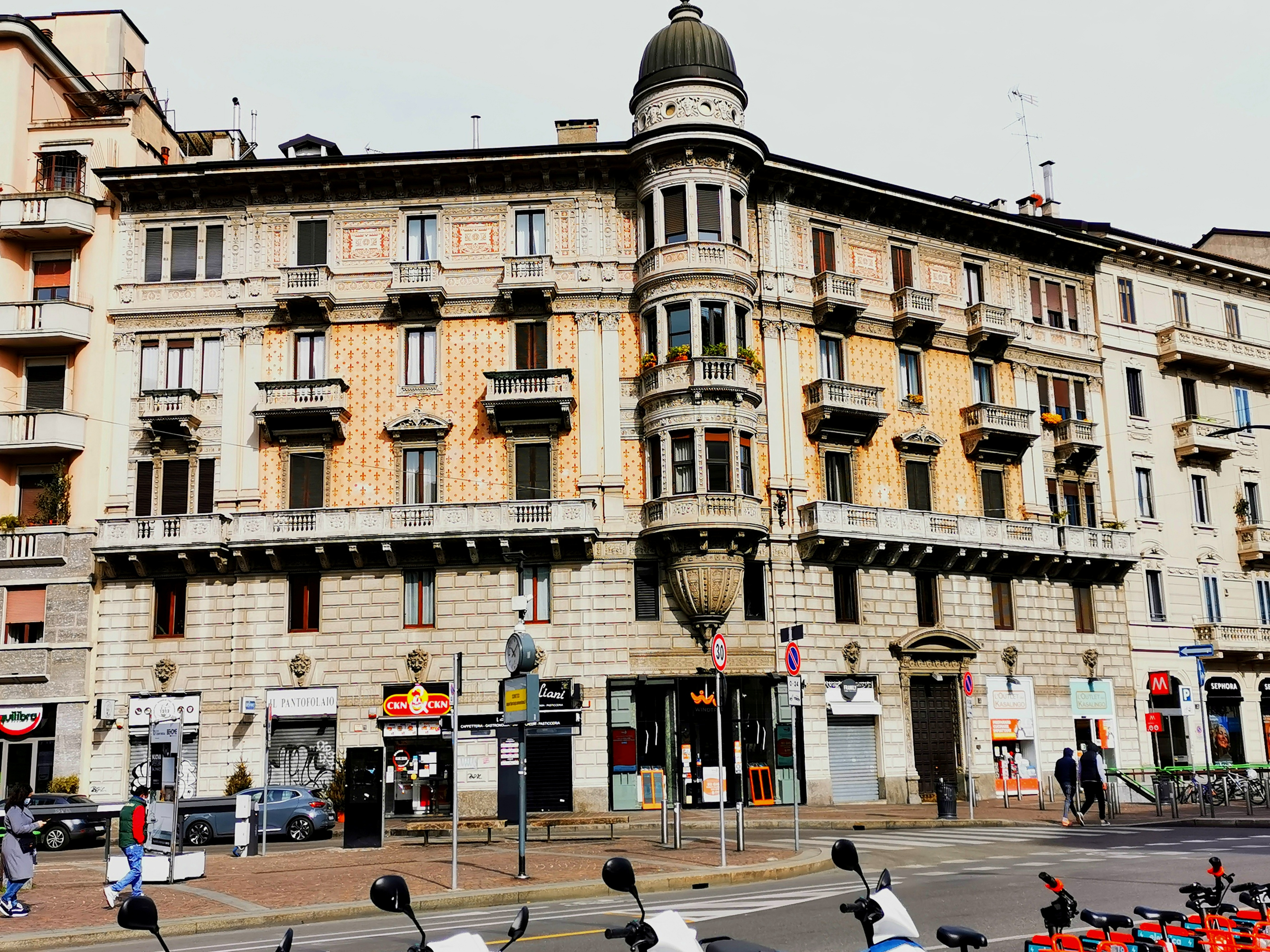
Liberty style architecture

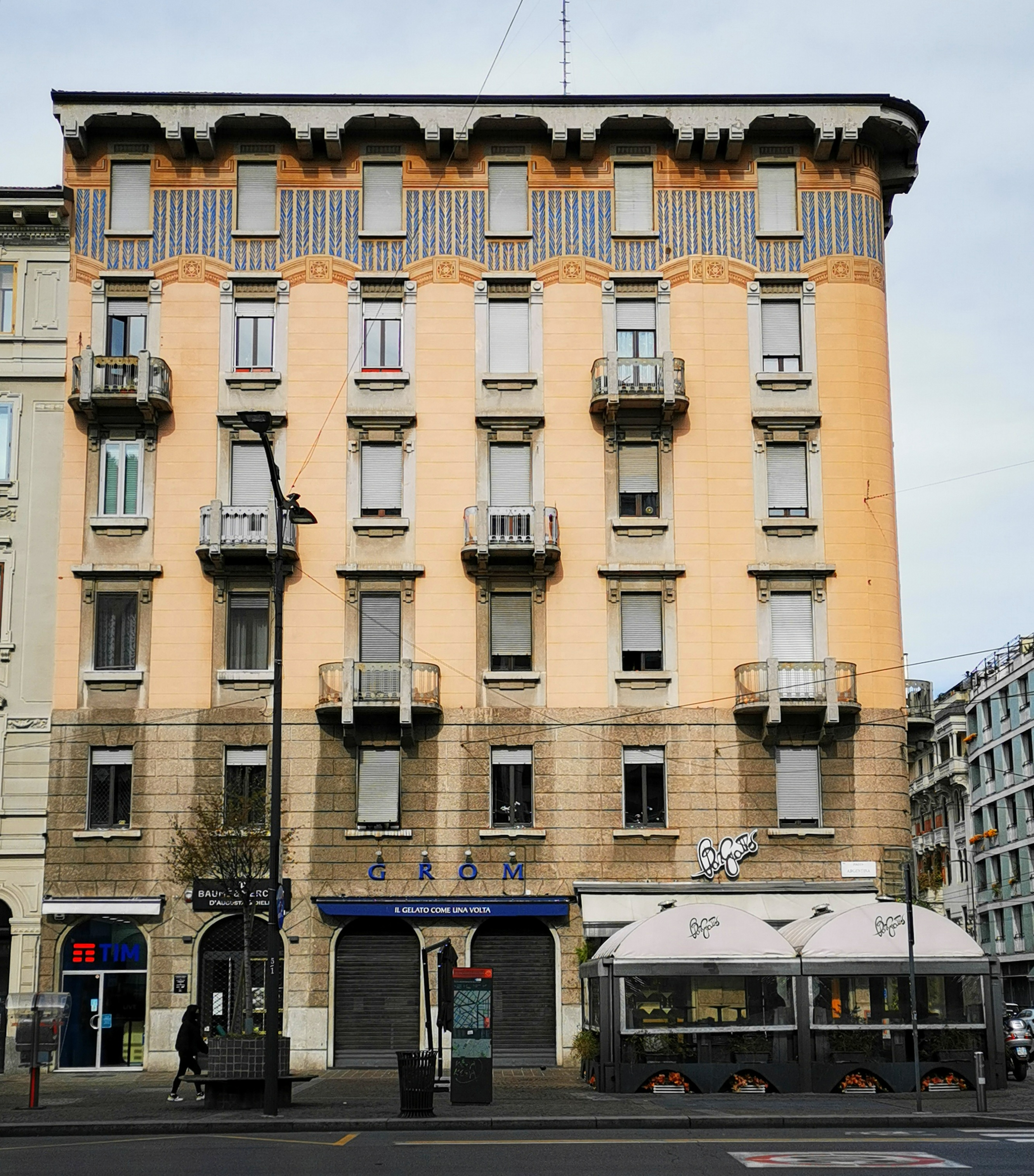
Liberty style architecture

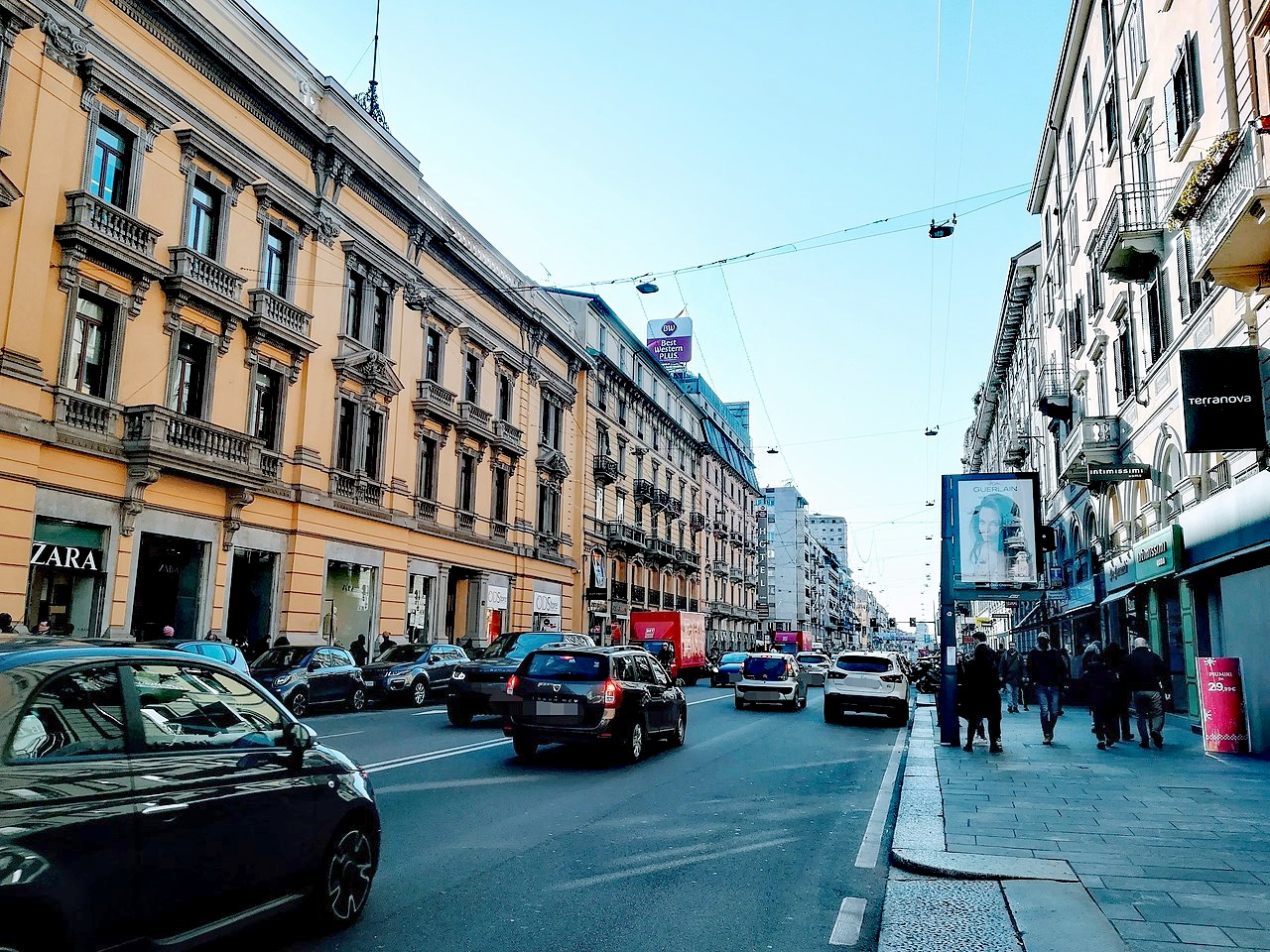
Corso Buenos Aires is one of the most prominent shopping streets in Europe

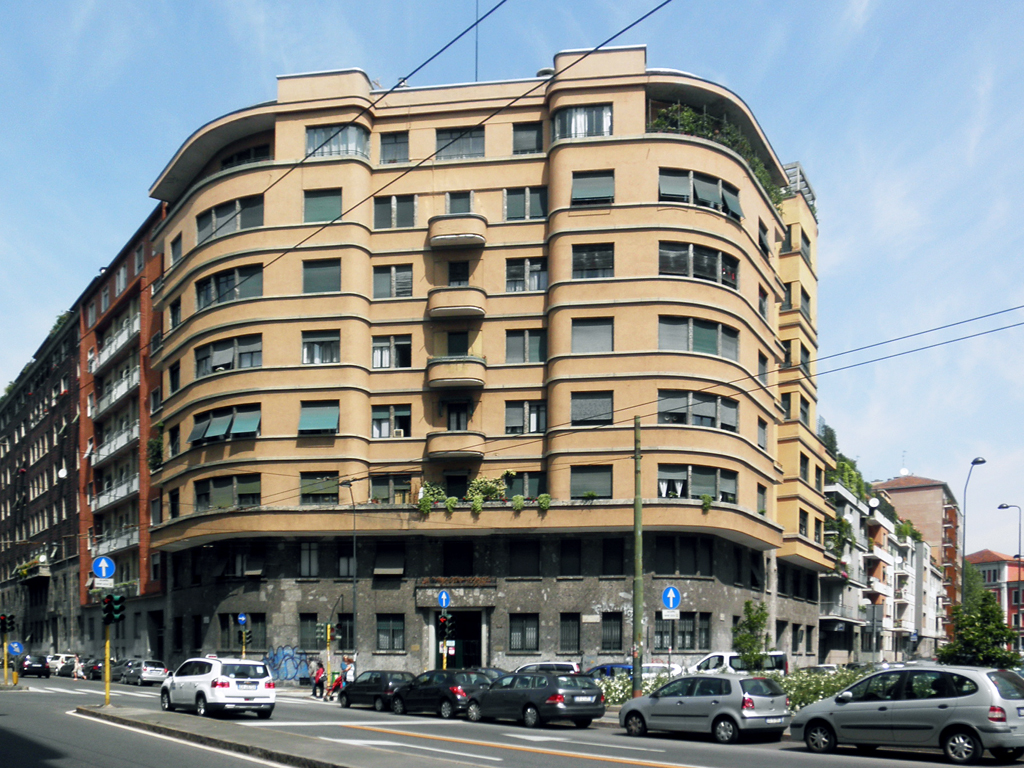
Typical Italian rationalist architecture, common style for residential buildings realized during the Fascist Regime

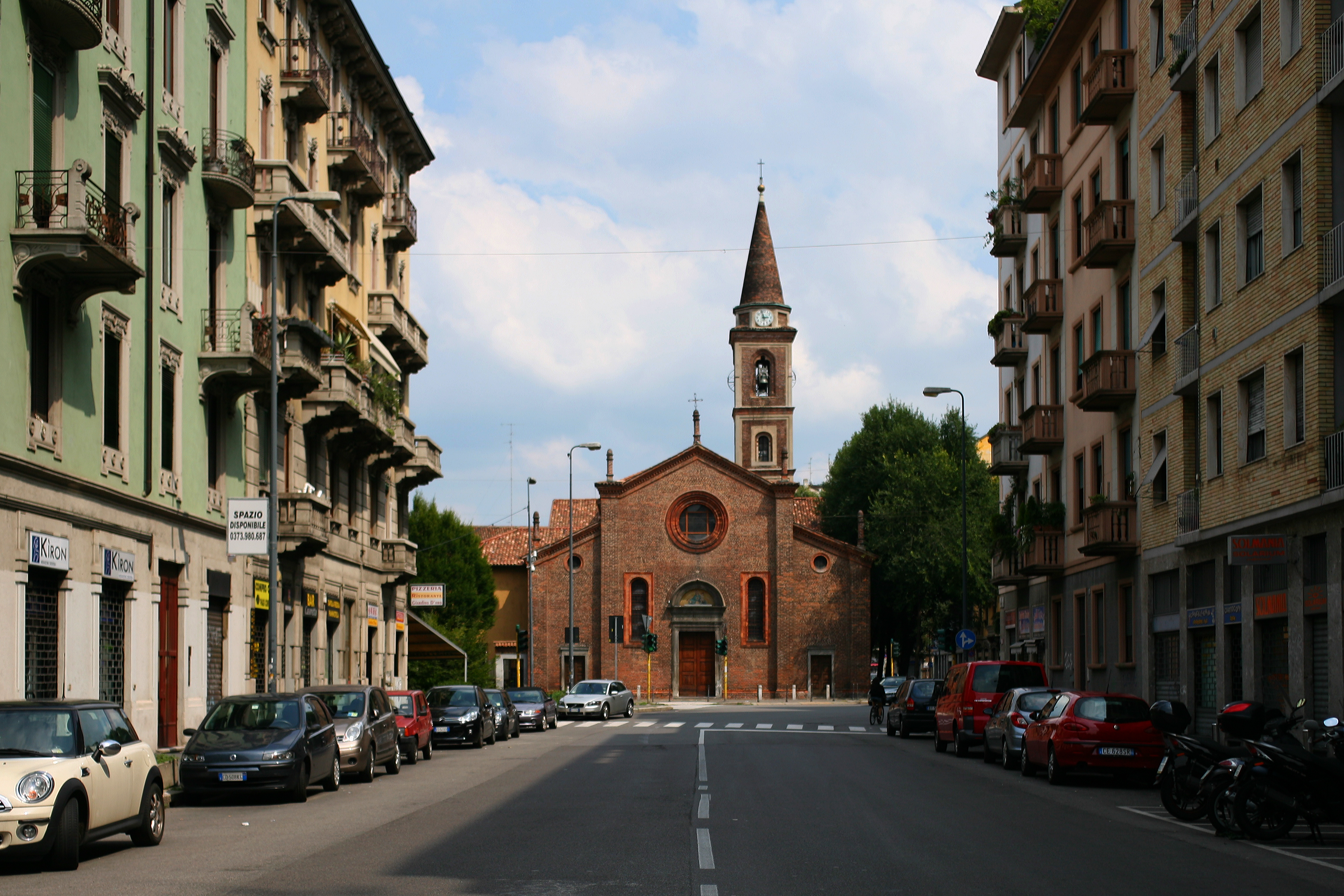
Casoretto Abbey

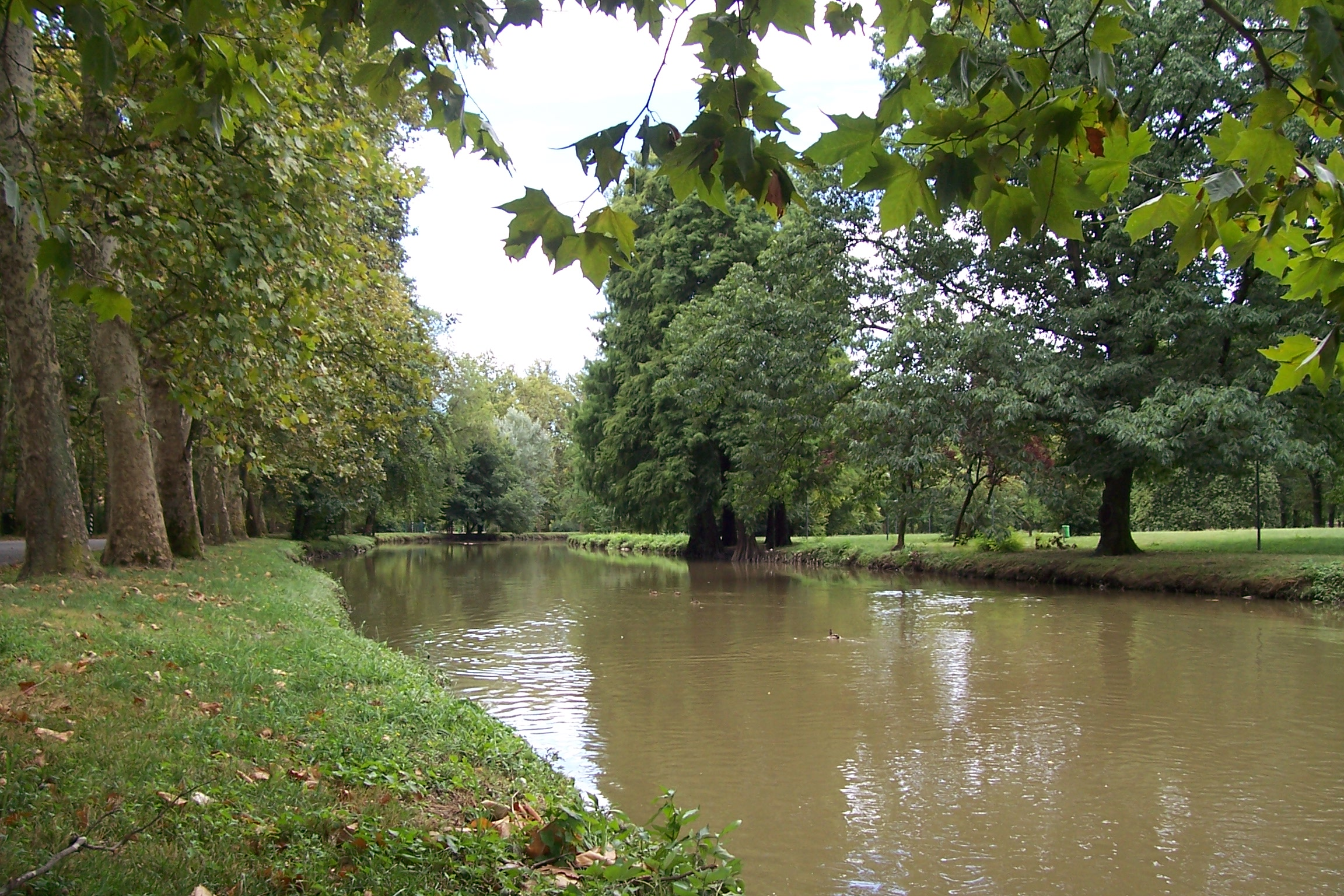
Parco Lambro, public park established in 1934

== Maps ==
Map of Milan Zone 3
