= Milano Lambrate railway station =

Railway station in Milan, Italy

Milano Lambrate
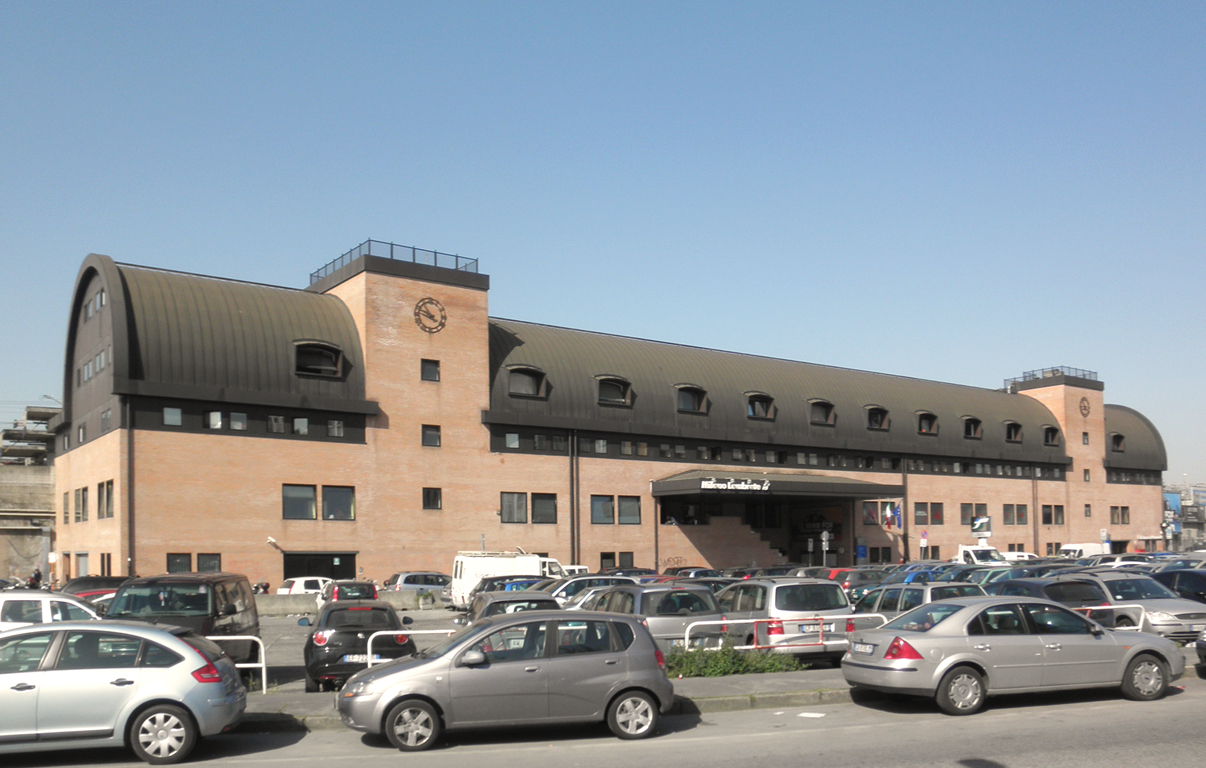
- The new passenger building of Milano Lambrate station in 2011

General information
- Location: Piazza Enrico Bottini 10; 20133 Milan; Italy
- Coordinates: 45°29′06″N 09°14′13″E
- Operator: Rete Ferroviaria Italiana; Centostazioni
- Lines: Milan belt railway Milano–Genova; Milano–Venezia; Milano–Bologna
- Tracks: 12
- Train operators: Trenitalia; Trenord
- Connections: Line M2; ATM trams; ATM trolleybuses, ATM urban buses, intercity buses

Other information
- Fare zone: STIBM: Mi1

History
- Opened: 1931; 95 years ago
- Electrified: 1938

Services
Preceding station	Trenord	Following station
Milano Greco Pirelli towards Saronno	Line S9 (Milan suburban railway service)	Milano Forlanini towards Albairate–Vermezzo
Location
- Location within Milan

Milano Lambrate railway station (Italian: Stazione di Milano Lambrate) is one of the main stations serving the city and comune of Milan, Italy. It is located in the north-eastern part of the city, and takes its name from the neighborhood of the same name.

Opened in 1931, the station is the third largest in Milan in terms of number of tracks, after Milano Centrale and Milano Porta Garibaldi. It is part of the Milan belt railway as well as of the railways linking Milan with Genoa, Venice, Bologna and Mantua.

The station is managed by Rete Ferroviaria Italiana (RFI), while the commercial area of the passenger building is managed by Centostazioni. The train services are operated by Trenitalia and Trenord.

Underneath the station, on its southwestern side and connected with it, is a Milan Metro station of the same name on Line 2.

== Location ==
Milano Lambrate railway station is situated at Piazza Enrico Bottini, in the northeastern Milanese district of Lambrate, which, until 1924, was a separate comune from Milan. It is within walking distance of the university/politecnico campus, in the neighbourhood named Città Studi.

== History ==
The station inherited its name from an earlier station, located in the district of Ortica. The earlier station was opened in 1896, on the original route of the Milan-Venice railway (the so-called Strada ferrata ferdinandea, named in honour of Emperor Ferdinand I of Austria).

The passenger building of the original station still stands on Via G. A. Amedeo, near the church of Saints Faustinus and Jovita and the present-day Buccari flyover.

In 1931, during the reorganization of the entire Milanese railway system, the original station was replaced by the present one, located on the Milan belt railway.

In the early 1990s, a new passenger terminal was constructed. It was designed by architect Ignazio Gardella and is located at Piazza Monte Titano. The 1931 building, renovated in 2005, now houses some commercial activities.

== Features ==
The station is equipped with 12 tracks, usually allocated as follows:

- 1: S9 trains from Saronno to Albairate-Vermezzo.
- 2: Trains terminating at Lambrate.
- 3: Regional trains from Porta Garibaldi / Greco Pirelli to Piacenza or Voghera.
- 4: S9 trains from Albairate-Vermezzo to Saronno, regional trains from Piacenza or Voghera to Porta Garibaldi / Greco Pirelli.
- 5: Local and medium-distance trains from Porta Garibaldi / Greco Pirelli to Treviglio (regular line).
- 6: Local and medium-distance trains from Treviglio (regular line) to Porta Garibaldi / Greco Pirelli.
- 7: Medium- and long-distance trains from Centrale to Treviglio (high-speed line).
- 8: Medium- and long-distance trains from Treviglio (high-speed line) to Centrale.
- 9: Long-distance trains (usually non stopping) from Centrale to Rogoredo.
- 10: Long-distance trains (usually non stopping) from Rogoredo to Centrale.
- 11: Regional and Interregional trains from Centrale to Rogoredo.
- 12: Regional and Interregional trains from Rogoredo to Centrale.

== Interchange ==
The station offers interchange with Milan Metro Line 2, tram line 19, trolleybus line 93, several urban bus lines (NM2, N54, 39, 45, 53, 54, 54/, 81, Q39, Q55, Q75), and an intercity bus line (924).

== Gallery ==
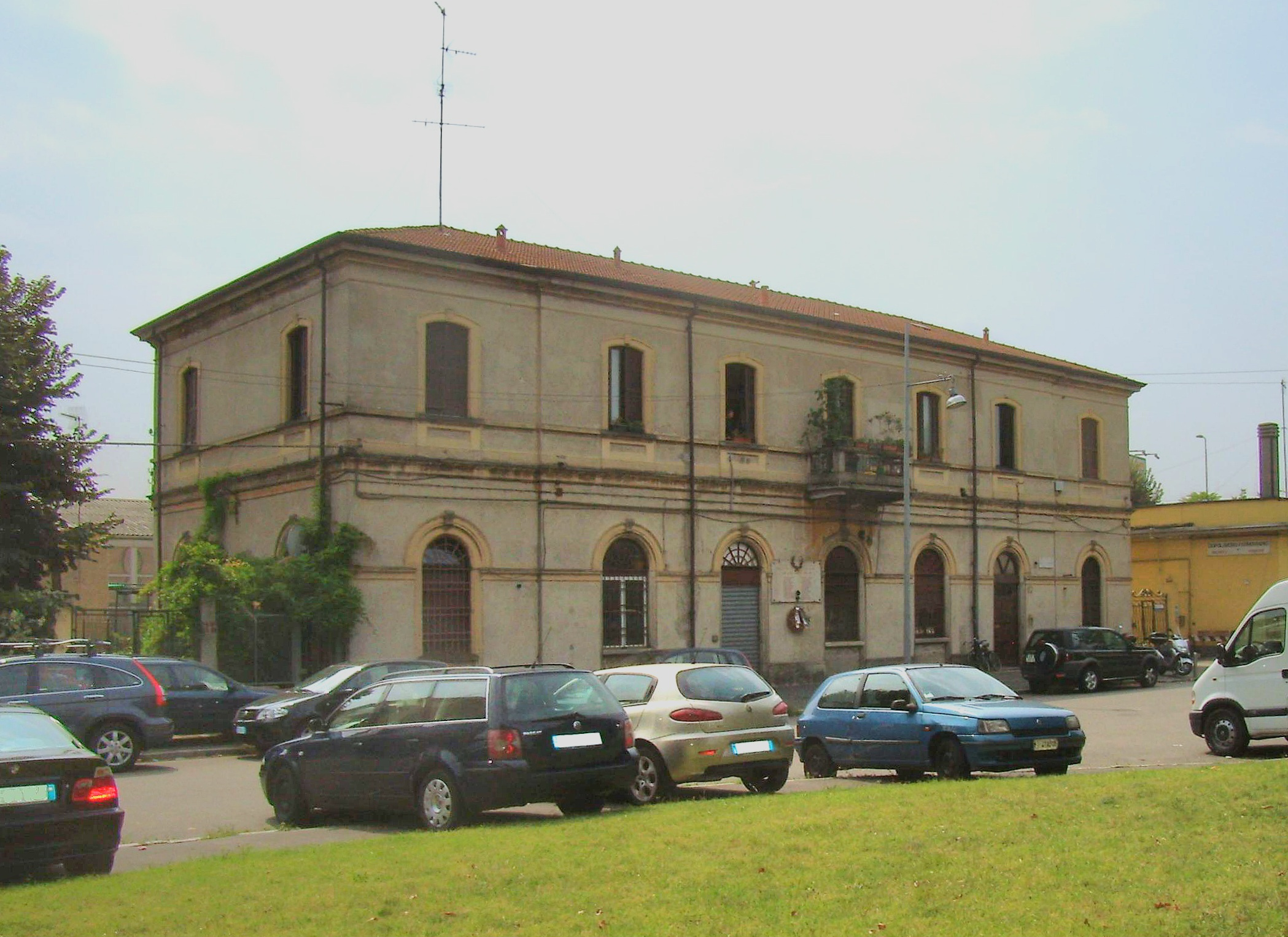
The passenger building of the original station

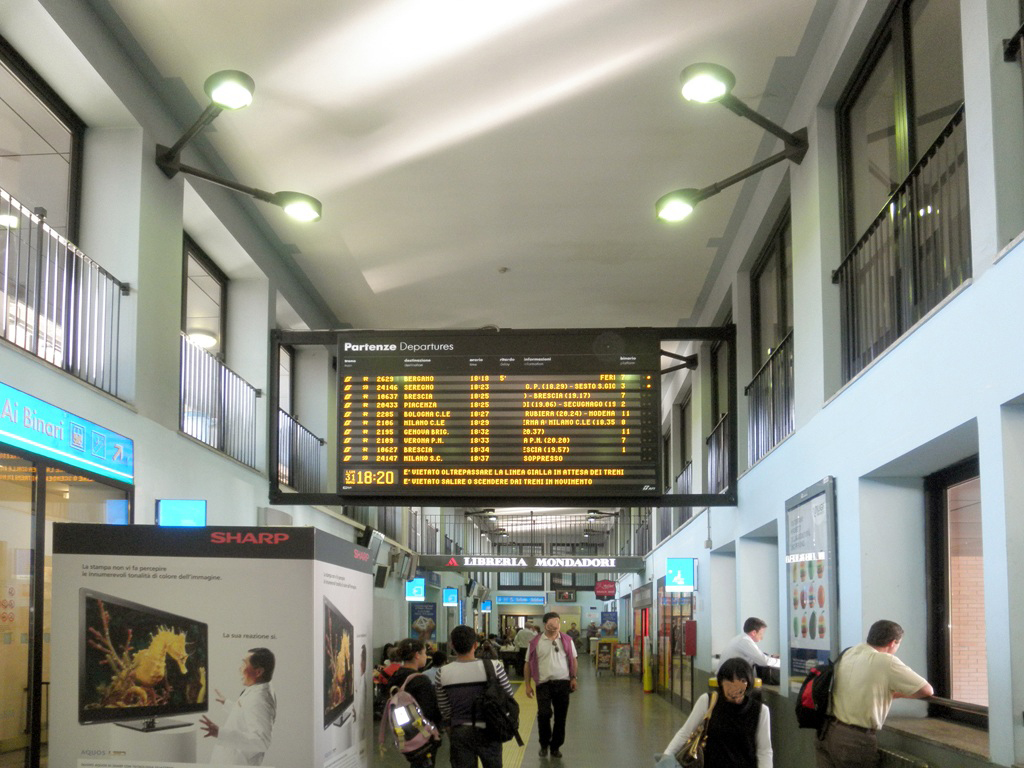
Inside the passenger building

== See also ==
- Railway stations in Milan
- History of rail transport in Italy
- Rail transport in Italy
- Railway stations in Italy
