= Birrificio Lambrate =

Craft brewery in Milan

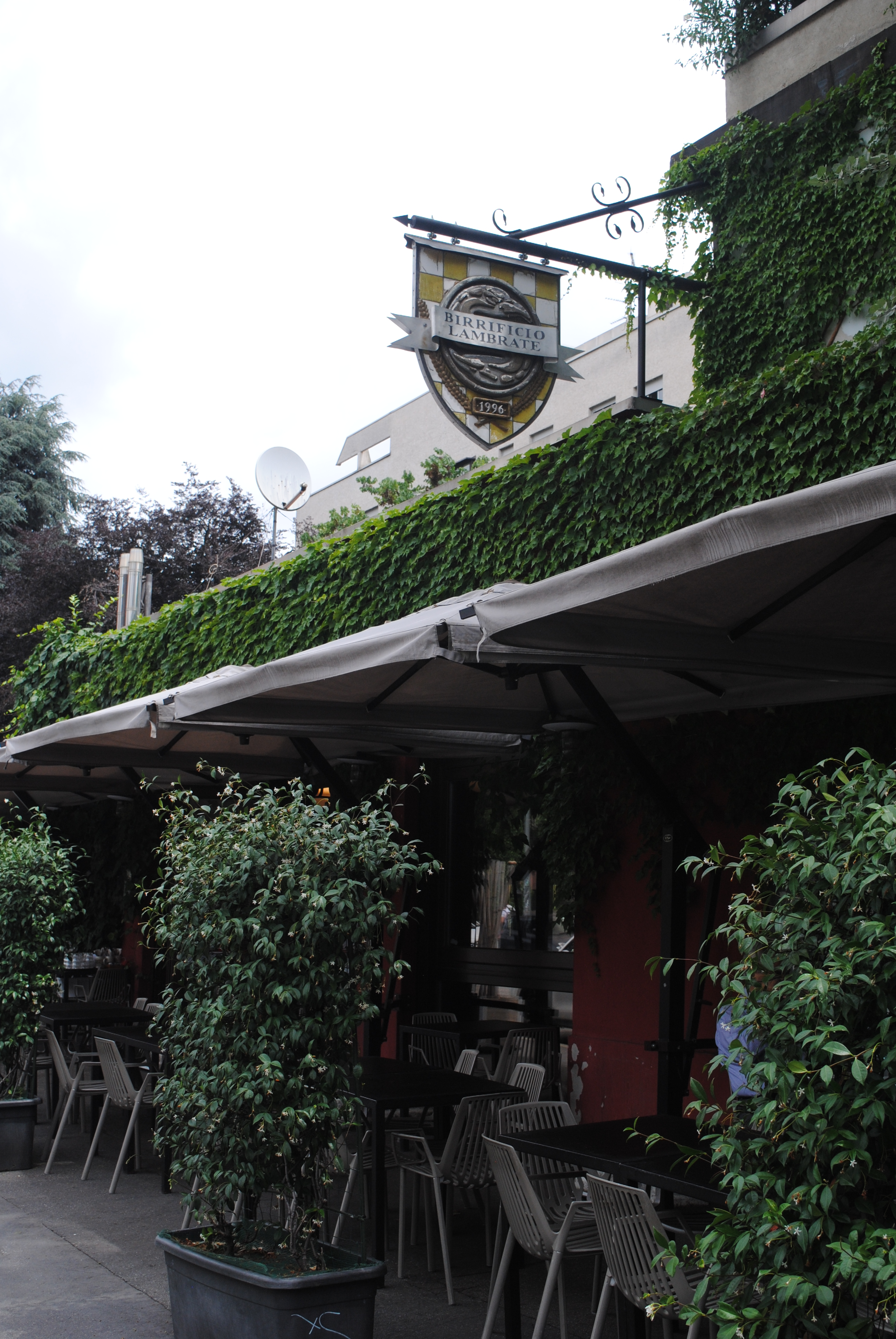
- The frontage on Via Camillo Golgi, seen in June 2018
- Interactive map of Birrificio Lambrate
- Type: Brewpub/ Craft brewery
- Location: Lambrate, 20134 Milan, Italy Via Privata Gaetano Sbodio 30/1
- Coordinates: 45.48571°N 9.23150°E
- Opened: 1996
- Website: birrificiolambrate.com

Pronunciation
by a male Italian speaker

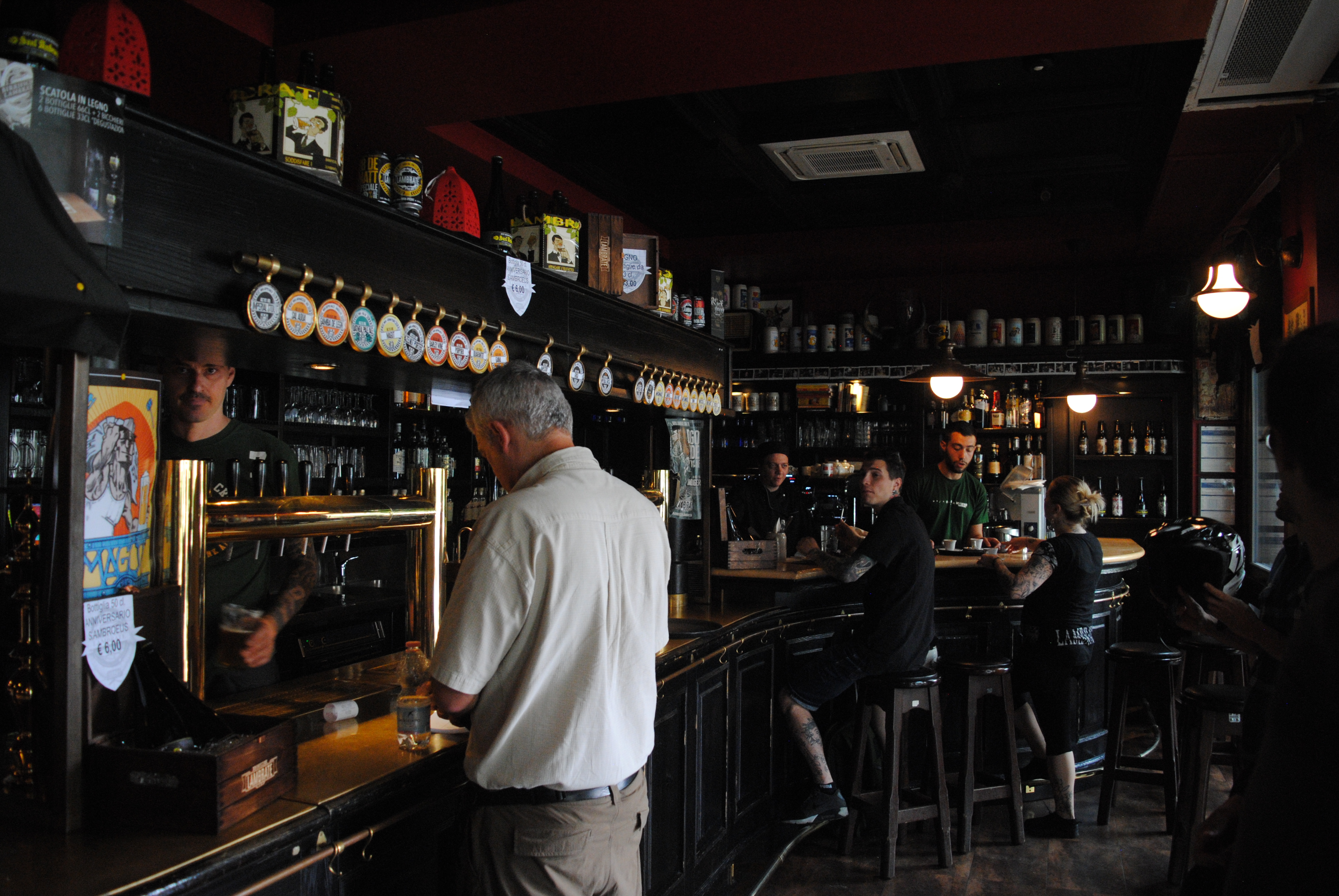
The bar at Via Camillo Golgi

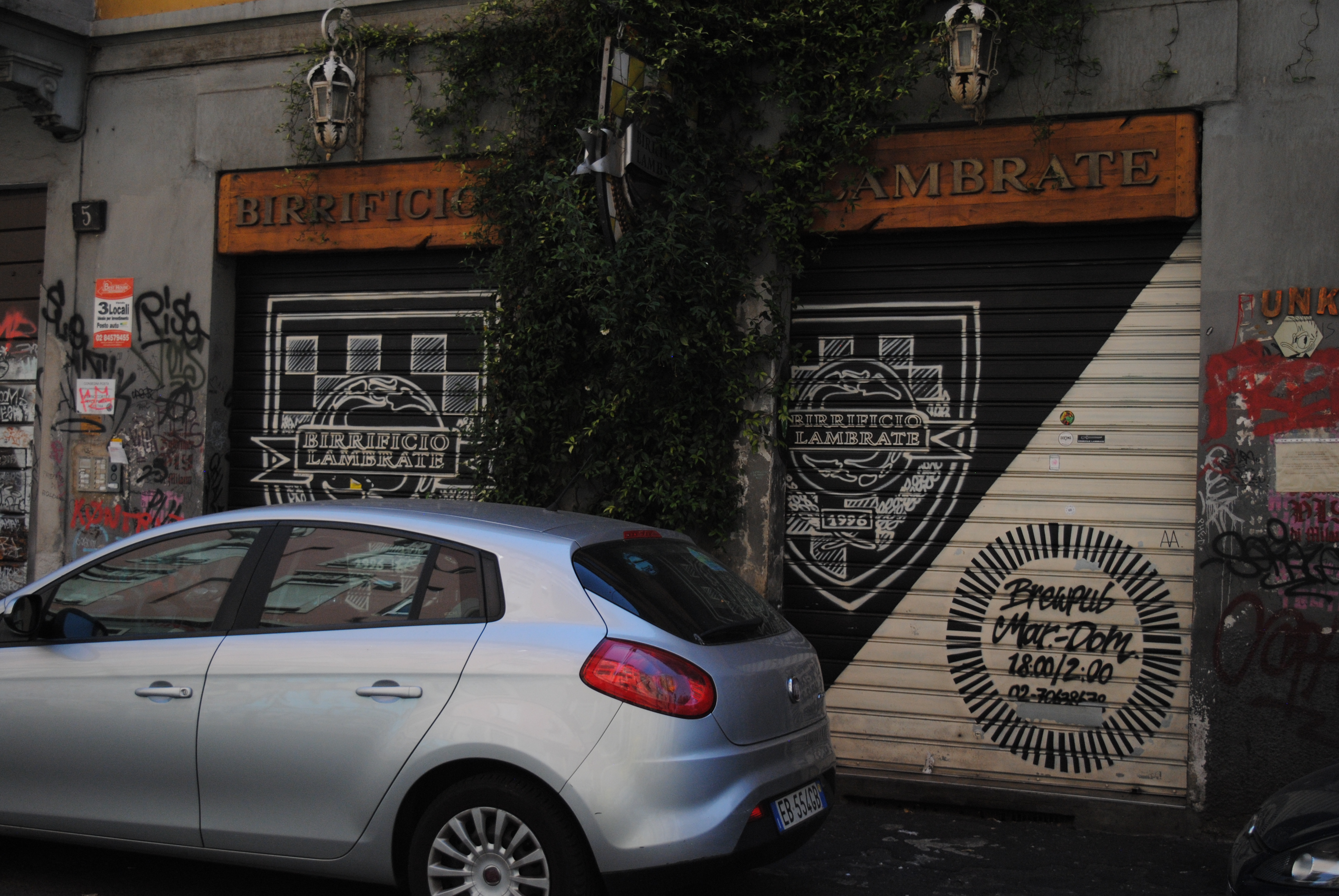
Pub on via Adelchi, Milan in June 2019

Birrificio di Lambrate is a craft brewery in the Lambrate district of Milan, Italy, founded in 1996. The brewery, formerly located at Via Adelchi, 5, angolo Via Porpora, 10100 is now at Via Privata Gaetano Sbodio 30/1, 20134. It has two outlets in Milan, a pub at Via Adelchi and an "English style" pub-restaurant, at Via Camillo Golgi, 60, 20133.
