= Rosemary Boyton =

British immunologist

- Born: Rosemary Jane Boyton
- Education: University of London
- Scientific career
- Fields: Immunology; Respiratory medicine
- Workplaces: Imperial College London; Royal Brompton Hospital; Guy's Hospital; Hammersmith Hospital
- Thesis: T cell receptor signalling in Th1 and th2 cytokine responses in autoimmunity (2000)
- Website: www.imperial.ac.uk/people/r.boyton

Rosemary Jane Boyton is a British immunologist who is Head of Lung Immunology and Adult Infectious Disease at Imperial College London. She works on the molecular immunology of infectious, allergic and autoimmune inflammation. She holds an honorary consultant position at the Royal Brompton Hospital, where she specialises in lung infection.

== Early life and education ==
Boyton trained in medicine at the Royal Free London NHS Foundation Trust and gained a Bachelor of Medicine, Bachelor of Surgery (MB BS) degree. She served as a junior doctor in various London hospitals, including the Royal Brompton Hospital, Guy's Hospital and the Hammersmith Hospital. After training in respiratory medicine, infectious diseases and general medicine, Boyton was awarded a Wellcome Trust research fellowship to complete a PhD at Imperial College London where she studied the mechanisms that underpin T helper cell responses.

== Research and career ==
After earning her doctoral degree, Boyton completed her specialist training at St Mary's Hospital and the Royal Free Hospital. She was awarded a Medical Research Council fellowship to develop novel models of lung inflammation. Boyton established the Imperial College London Lung Immunology Group, where she studies respiratory infection and asthma. In allergic asthma, lung inflammation is caused by a CD4 T cell that attacks otherwise harmless allergens. This attack can trigger an immune reaction which damages bodily tissue. Boyton has studied how the body responds to pollen, in an effort to improve treatment for people who suffer from hayfever. She showed that it was peptide 26 in the pollen that is most regularly recognised by the immune system. In 2016 she was awarded a Medical Research Council (MRC) grant to investigate correlates of immunity to Zika virus.

During the COVID-19 pandemic, Boyton studied the requirements for countries to move out of lockdown. As of late April 2020, around one third of the world's population was under lockdown. Boyton explained that to begin to reopen countries, there should be investment in increased testing, immune status return-to-work permits and contact tracing. She has claimed that countries that which reopen ignore the fact that outbreaks amongst low-risk individuals can still cause a pandemic. Boyton emphasised that there would be a need for more accurate and specific antibody tests, which could identify asymptomatic SARS-CoV-2 sufferers who have recovered from the disease, and seroprevalence data. In the case of Severe Acute Respiratory Syndrome, 90% of survivors had virus-neutralising antibodies, and around half had strong T-lymphocyte responses. Boyton believes that policy should be guided by data and evidence rather than assumptions about herd immunity. Her research has been funded by the Medical Research Council (MRC) and Biotechnology and Biological Sciences Research Council (BBSRC).

=== Selected publications ===
- Boyton, R. J.; Altmann, D. M. (2007). "Natural killer cells, killer immunoglobulin-like receptors and human leucocyte antigen class I in disease". Clinical & Experimental Immunology. 149 (1): 1–8. doi:10.1111/j.1365-2249.2007.03424.x. ISSN 0009-9104. PMC 1942026. PMID 17521317.
- Campbell, John D.; Buckland, Karen F.; McMillan, Sarah J.; Kearley, Jennifer; Oldfield, William L. G.; Stern, Lawrence J.; Grönlund, Hans; van Hage, Marianne; Reynolds, Catherine J.; Boyton, Rosemary J.; Cobbold, Stephen P. (2009). "Peptide immunotherapy in allergic asthma generates IL-10–dependent immunological tolerance associated with linked epitope suppression". Journal of Experimental Medicine. 206 (7): 1535–1547. doi:10.1084/jem.20082901. ISSN 0022-1007. PMC 2715096. PMID 19528258.
- Boyton, Rosemary J.; Openshaw, Peter J. (2002). "Pulmonary defences to acute respiratory infection". British Medical Bulletin. 61 (1): 1–12. doi:10.1093/bmb/61.1.1. ISSN 0007-1420. PMID 11997295.
- Boyton, Rosemary J (2005). "Infectious lung complications in patients with HIV/AIDS". Current Opinion in Internal Medicine. 4 (4): 400–404. doi:10.1097/01.mcp.0000156992.53246.f8. ISSN 1535-5942. PMID 15818180. S2CID 32685800.
