= Boyton End, Suffolk =

Hamlet in Suffolk, England

Coordinates: 52.07°N 0.506°E

Boyton End
- Location within Suffolk
- OS grid reference: TL7144
- Civil parish: Stoke-by-Clare
- District: West Suffolk
- Shire county: Suffolk
- Region: East
- Country: England
- Sovereign state: United Kingdom
- Police: Suffolk
- Fire: Suffolk
- Ambulance: East of England

Boyton End is a hamlet in Suffolk, England, about 3 miles or 5 km east of the town of Haverhill, and almost on the Stour Valley Path. Boyton was recorded in the Domesday Book as Alia Boituna.
