= Lambrate =

Lambrate Lambraa (Lombard)
- Quarter of Milan
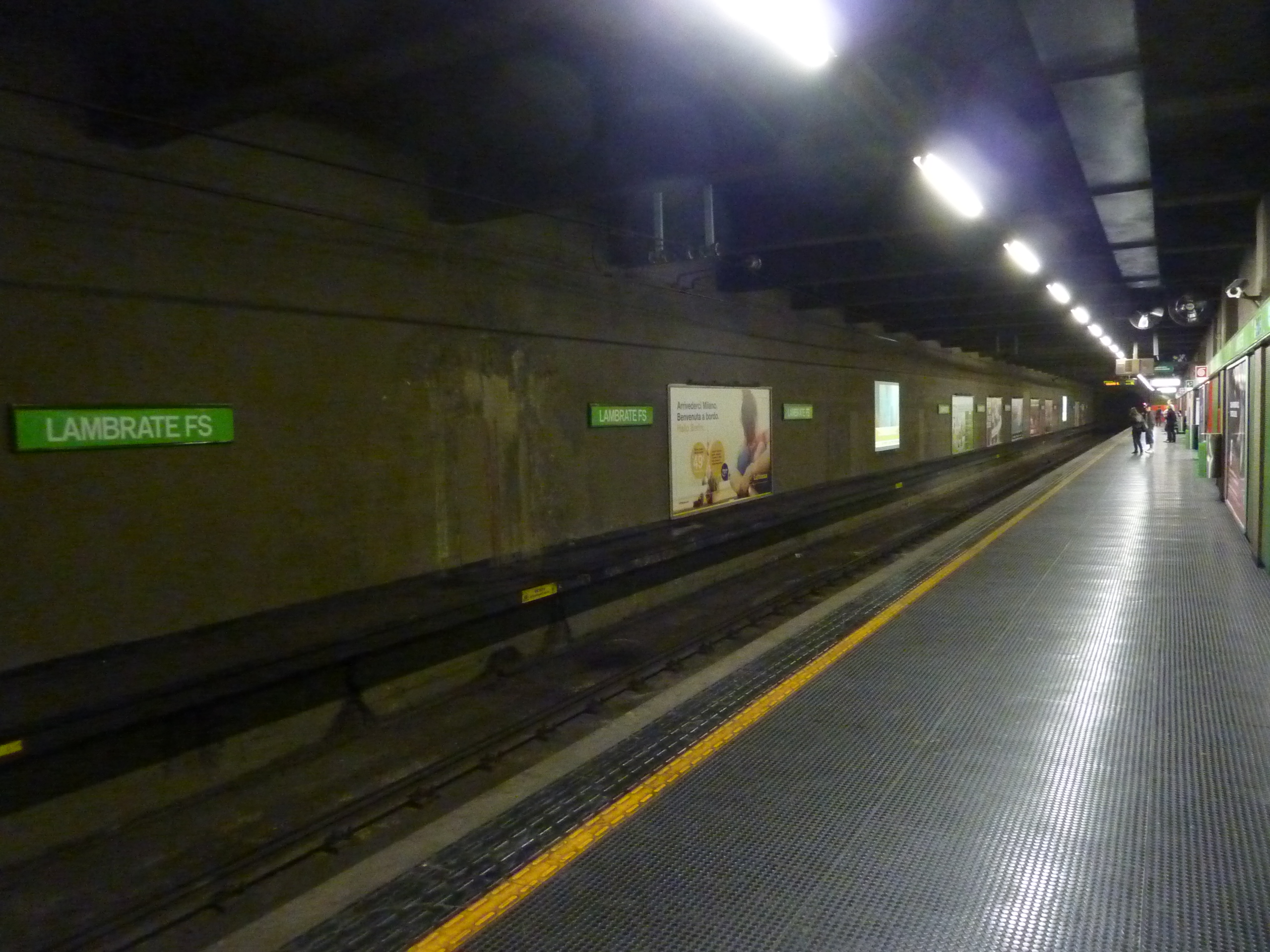
- Milano Lambrate railway station

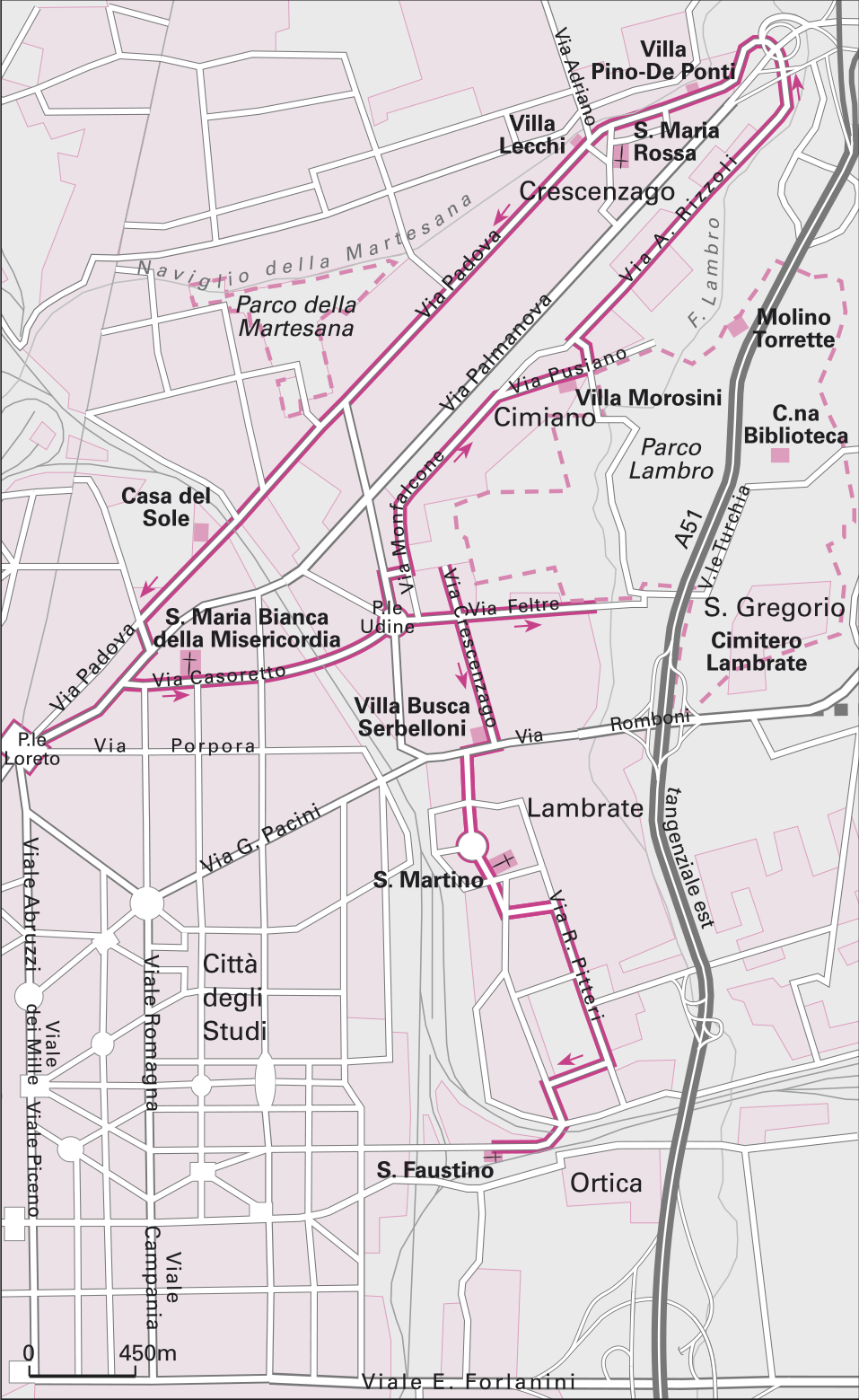
- Coordinates: 45.482506°N 9.241047°E
- Country: Italy
- Region: Lombardy
- Province: Milan
- Comune: Milan
- Zone: 3
- Time zone: UTC+1 (CET)
  - Summer (DST): UTC+2 (CEST)

Lambrate (Milanese: Lambraa [lãˈbraː]) is a quarter of Milan, Italy, located within the Zone 3 administrative division, 6 km (3.7 mi) north-east of the city centre. It owes its name to the Lambro river that traverses the area. Milano Lambrate railway station, the third-largest railway station in Milan, is located in Lambrate. The district is also well known for Parco Lambro, a large urban park established in 1934. The famous Lambretta motor scooter was manufactured in Lambrate, and named after this district, as is Birrificio Lambrate, a craft brewery established in 1996.

== History ==
Lambrate originated as a Roman vicus. The Romans conquered the area in 222 BC, after a long siege of Milan (then Mediolanum), where Romans fought against the local Insubres and Boii as well as their ally Hannibal. Pliny the Elder mentions mansio ad Lambrus (Lambrate) in his Naturalis historia as a supply station; it is also likely that Lambrate served as a river port for Mediolanum. The Romans largely developed the area, both for agriculture and for navigation on the Po River basin. Finds of the old Roman settlement of Lambrate, including a marble sarcophagus, have been revealed in 1905 and are now exposed at the Sforza Castle museum. The small chapel in the centre of Lambrate was supposedly one of the first places of Christian worship in the area.

In the 8th and 9th century, two monasteries of the Order of Saint Benedict were built in Lambrate. In 1162, when Milan was demolished by Frederick I Barbarossa, Lambrate was proclaimed an "imperial borgo"; many Milanese refugees found a new home here.

During Spanish rule (in the 16th century), a war factory called "Polveriera" was built in Lambrate, which played a major role in the development of the area.

The Spanish transformed Lambrate into a fief, a condition that lasted until Lombardy fell under the Napoleonic Empire, when Lambrate became a free comune in 1798. In 1808, Lambrate was annexed to Milan by the French viceroy's decree.

In 1816, during the Austrian rule, Lambrate was again an autonomous comune, to be annexed to Milan once again in 1923.

In the first half of the 20th century, the Martinitt corporation was based in Lambrate.

After World War II, the Innocenti machine factory began producing in Lambrate the famous motorcycle Lambretta, that owes its name to Lambrate.

A new public mural for the local school was commissioned for n 2026.

== The Chapel ==
One of the prominent monuments of Lambrate is the old chapel located in the centre of the district, at the corner of via Bertolazzi and via Dardanoni, which existed since Roman times (possibly having a pagan rather than Christian origin). Officially named San Martino in Lambrate, it was founded in 1180.

The history of the chapel is intertwined with the lives of Saints Charles Borromeo and Federico Borromeo.

According to Alessandro Manzoni's scholars, an implicit reference to the chapel is found in The Betrothed when the main character Renzo Tramaglino travels from Milan to Trezzo d'Adda.

During World War II, on 13 August 1943, the chapel was hit by a bomb that knocked down part of the roof and landed on the altar, without exploding.

== See also ==
- Lambretta
- Parco Lambro
- Martinitt
- Stazione di Milano Lambrate
