= Boyton End, Essex =

Hamlet in Essex, England

Coordinates: 51.966°N 0.351°E

Boyton End
- Location within Essex
- OS grid reference: TL6232
- Shire county: Essex
- Region: East
- Country: England
- Sovereign state: United Kingdom
- Police: Essex
- Fire: Essex
- Ambulance: East of England

Boyton End is a hamlet in the Uttlesford district of Essex, England. It is located approximately one mile north-east of Thaxted on the B1051 road.
