= Città Studi =

Coordinates: 45.478155°N 9.226284°E

- Quarter of Milan
- Country: Italy
- Region: Lombardy
- Province: Milan
- Comune: Milan
- Zone: 3
- Time zone: UTC+1 (CET)
  - Summer (DST): UTC+2 (CEST)

Città Studi (literally, "studies city") is a district ("quartiere") of Milan, Italy, located within the Zone 3 administrative division. Its name comes from the fact that the Politecnico technical university, as well as most technical and scientific branches of the University of Milan, are based in this area. The area also houses several prominent hospitals of Milan, including the IRCCS National Cancer Foundation and the Carlo Besta Neurological Institute.

There are plans to relocate the University of Milan from Città Studi to the former Expo campus at Rho fiera by 2025, which have met considerable opposition.
