= Molecular Immunology =

- Discipline: Immunology
- Language: English
- Edited by: M.R. Daha

Publication details
- Publisher: Pergamon Press

Standard abbreviations
- ISO 4: Mol. Immunol.

Indexing
- ISSN: 0161-5890

Links
- Journal homepage

Molecular Immunology is a peer reviewed academic journal published by Pergamon Press (an imprint of Elsevier). The editor is M.R. Daha.
