= Augusto Magnaghi =

Italian architect and designer (1914–1963)

- Born: Augusto Magnaghi Delfino; 27 August 1914; Milan, Italy
- Died: 23 November 1963 (aged 49); Milan, Italy
- Education: Polytechnic University of Milan
- Occupations: Architect, designer

Augusto Magnaghi (27 August 1914 – 23 November 1963) was an Italian architect and designer. He was one of the notable Milanese architects of the early postwar period, working mainly in public architecture, residential buildings and industrial design.

== Life and career ==
Born in Milan to Carlo Magnaghi and Dorina Alberizio, originally from Casorate Primo in the province of Pavia, Magnaghi graduated in architecture from the Polytechnic University of Milan in 1936, where he met Mario Terzaghi, with whom he established a long professional collaboration.

In his early career, he worked at the studio of Giuseppe Terragni and Pietro Lingeri, contributing to the preparation of the competition project for the Palazzo del Littorio. In 1939 Magnaghi and Terzaghi designed the "Casa dei Nidi" in Fino Mornasco, an early Rationalist residential building, and in 1941 they joined the futurist movement.

After World War II, Magnaghi and Terzaghi collaborated with INA-Casa, also exploring prefabricated construction systems for public housing, including projects in Milan's QT8 district and the Quartiere Feltre. In collaboration with Ignazio Gardella, they contributed to the design of the hospital in Ivrea, while with Vittorio Gandolfi they worked on the new airport project for Lagos, Nigeria. They received the Montini Prize for the design of the church of San Filippo Neri in the Bovisasca district of Milan.

Alongside architecture, Magnaghi worked in industrial design. He designed the first sofa bed for the Busnelli company and created door handles that became part of the collection of the Museum of Modern Art in New York. These handles were also installed on the Italian ocean liners Raffaello and Michelangelo. In 1954 he received the Compasso d'Oro award for the design of the first modular kitchen produced by the SAFFA company.

Magnaghi's architectural works include the workers' village of the Vita Mayer paper mill in Cairate (1950), the Comasina district in Milan (1953–1969), and Metanopoli in San Donato Milanese (1952–1991). He also designed the elementary school of Orago (1954), the Scala district in Pavia (1966–1973), the Rossi laboratories in Albizzate (1956–1958), the BICA-Montecatini headquarters in Milan (1955–1958), and several religious and civic buildings, including the church of Villa Cagnola in Gazzada Schianno (1959–1963) and the INAM clinic in Cremona (1960).

Magnaghi died in Milan on 23 November 1963, while he was working on the Fornaroli Hospital in Magenta.

== Sources ==
- Bevilacqua, Francesco (2001). "Augusto Magnaghi". In Godoli, Ezio (ed.). Dizionario del futurismo. Vol. 1. Florence: Vallecchi. p. 675.
- Terzaghi, Mario (1969). "Augusto Magnaghi". In Portoghesi, Paolo (ed.). Dizionario enciclopedico di architettura e urbanistica. Vol. 4. Rome: Istituto Editoriale Romano. p. 165.
- Feraboli, Maria Teresa (2003). "Augusto Magnaghi e Mario Terzaghi". In Ciagà, Grazia Lidia (ed.). Gli archivi di architettura in Lombardia. Censimento delle fonti. Milan: Comune di Milano.
