= Villaggio ANIC =

Neighbourhood in Ravenna, Italy

- Neighbourhood
- Interactive map of Villaggio ANIC
- Coordinates: 44.4336°N 12.2069°E
- Country: Italy
- Region: Emilia-Romagna
- Province: Ravenna
- Municipality: Ravenna
- Construction: 1955–1964
- Founder: Eni
- Named for: Azienda Nazionale Idrogenazione Combustibili
- Postal code: 48122

Villaggio ANIC is a residential neighbourhood located in the San Giuseppe district of Ravenna, Emilia-Romagna, Italy. It was built by the Azienda Nazionale Idrogenazione Combustibili (ANIC), part of Eni, to house workers and employees of the nearby petrochemical complex developed after the discovery and exploitation of methane fields in the Ravenna area in the 1950s.

== History ==
The first plans were developed in 1955 by architect Mario Bacciocchi, who had previously designed Metanopoli for Eni in San Donato Milanese. The original scheme envisaged a company town integrated with the industrial plant. The first residential area, known as the "Modulo Z", was built near the factory for technical employees and their families.

From 1957, following the acquisition of additional land, the project was revised to create an autonomous residential district separated from the industrial complex. The new master plan was prepared by architects Vito and Gustavo Latis and presented in 1958. Conceived for around 15,000 inhabitants, it was organized into semi-independent residential units connected by green areas and public services. The final plan included eight residential areas around a central service core, with different building types for workers and managers.

Only part of the planned neighbourhood was completed between 1958 and 1960, consisting of around fifteen four-storey residential buildings. The project was later continued by Edoardo Gellner and, from 1964, by Marco Bacigalupo and Ugo Ratti, who completed additional housing, services and schools. After the privatization of the housing complex in the 1990s, the neighbourhood underwent several modifications, including an extension designed by Carlo Maria Sadich in 1993.

== Sources ==
- Deschermeier, Dorothea, ed. (2008). Impero ENI. L'architettura aziendale e l'urbanistica di Enrico Mattei. Bologna: Damiani. pp. 58–66.
- Fabbri, Roberto (2011). "Un progetto per Enrico Mattei. Chiesa e centro parrocchiale al villaggio A.N.I.C. di Ravenna (1960–1965)". In Pace, Sergio (ed.). Pier Luigi Nervi. Torino, la committenza industriale, le culture architettoniche e politecniche italiane. Cinisello Balsamo: Silvana Editoriale. pp. 49–53.
- Marzot, Nicola (March–April 1999). "Il recupero del "Villaggio Anic" a Ravenna" (PDF). Paesaggio urbano. Diossier di cultura e progetto della città. No. 2.
