= Mario Bacciocchi =

Italian architect and urban planner (1902–1974)

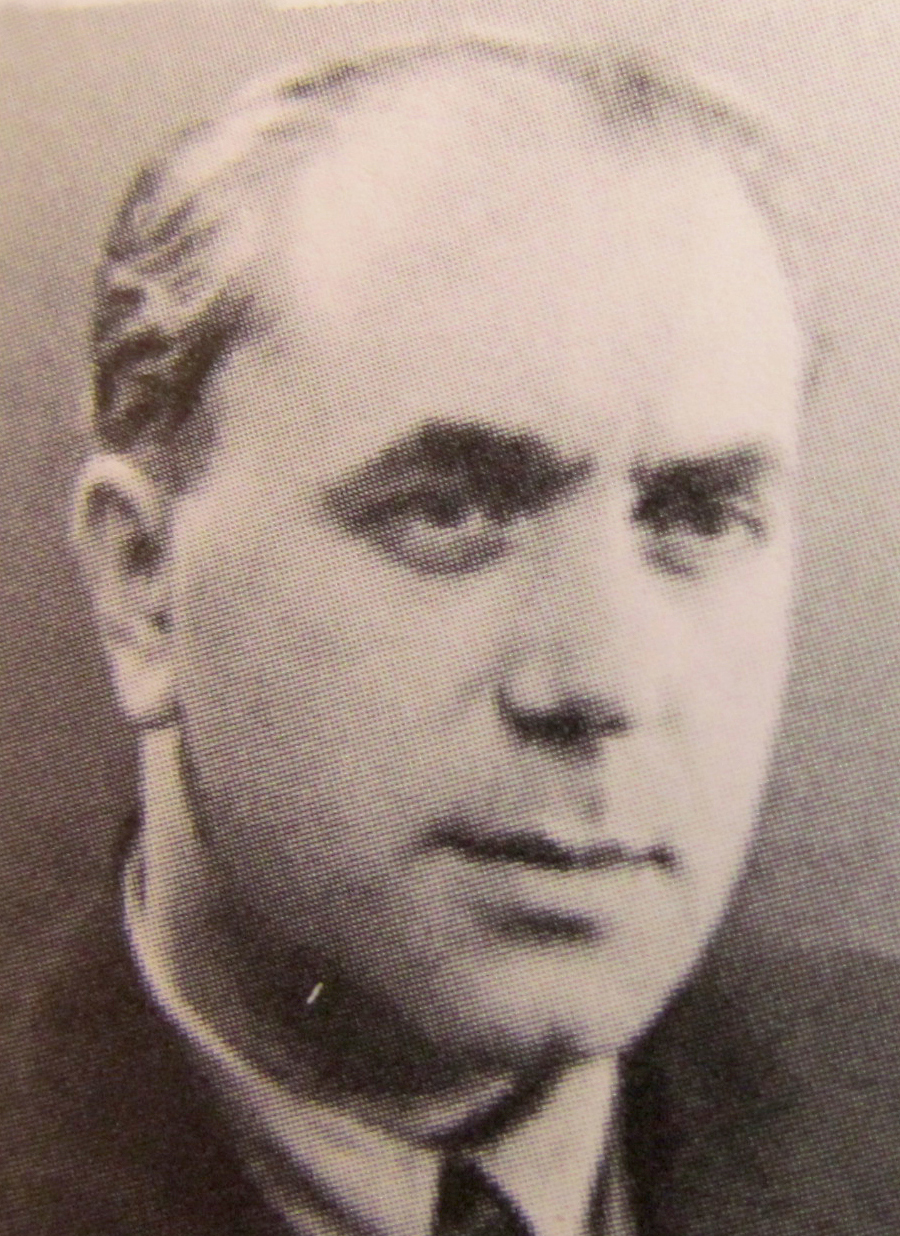
- Born: 17 September 1902; Fiorenzuola d'Arda, Province of Piacenza, Kingdom of Italy
- Died: 24 May 1974 (aged 71); Milan, Italy
- Education: Polytechnic University of Milan
- Occupations: Architect, urban planner

Mario Bacciocchi (17 September 1902 – 24 May 1974) was an Italian architect and urban planner.

== Life and career ==
Born in Fiorenzuola d'Arda, Bacciocchi graduated in architecture from the Polytechnic University of Milan in 1925. He became known for his urban and architectural projects in Milan, including the Locatelli Tower (1936–1939) and the residential tower on Via Ariberto (1952).

After World War II he worked on urban planning projects abroad, including the master plan of Gandhidham in India, and collaborated with Eni on projects such as Agip service stations and buildings in the Metanopoli district of San Donato Milanese. He designed the Madonna Queen Shrine in East Boston.

He was among the architects involved in the design of the Quartiere Feltre in Milan (1951–1961), together with Gino Pollini, Luciano Baldessari, Ignazio Gardella, Giancarlo De Carlo, Angelo Mangiarotti, and others. He also contributed to the design of the Villaggio ANIC in Ravenna (1956–1963).

In Piacenza, Bacciocchi designed the Liceo Melchiorre Gioia (1933–1937), the church of the Holy Trinity (1948–1951), the local headquarters of the Catholic University of the Sacred Heart (1949–1953), and the RDB Building.

Bacciocchi died in Milan in 1974.

== Selected works ==
- Villa Barilla, Salsomaggiore Terme (1925)
- Poggio Diana complex and Teatro Nuovo, Salsomaggiore Terme (1928; 1940)
- Competition project for Piazza del Duomo, Milan (first prize ex aequo, 1934)
- Liceo Melchiorre Gioia, Piacenza (1933–1937)
- Locatelli Tower, Milan (1936–1939)
- Piccolo Cottolengo and church of San Benedetto, Milan (1938)
- Church of the Holy Trinity, Piacenza (1948–1951)
- Master plan of Gandhidham, India (1949)
- Ara Pacis Mundi, Medea (1950)
- Quartiere Feltre, Milan (1951–1961; with Gino Pollini, Luciano Baldessari, Ignazio Gardella, Giancarlo De Carlo and others)
- Agip service station at Piazzale Accursio, Milan (1951–1953)
- Agip service station in Bari (1952)
- Agip service station in Lecce (1952)
- Master plan of Metanopoli, San Donato Milanese (1952–1955)
- Bacciocchi Tower, Milan (1952)
- Headquarters of the Catholic University of the Sacred Heart in Piacenza (1953–1957)
- RDB Building, Piacenza
- Church of Santa Barbara, San Donato Milanese (1955)
- Sacred Citadel of the Don Orione Foundation and the Queen Madonna Shrine, Orient Heights, Boston (1955–1956)
- Villaggio ANIC, Ravenna (1956–1963)
- Church of Sant'Ignazio di Loyola, Milan (1962–1963)
