= Annibale Fiocchi =

Italian architect (1915–2011)

- Born: 29 July 1915; Milan, Kingdom of Italy
- Died: August 2011 (aged 96)
- Education: Polytechnic University of Milan
- Occupation: Architect

Annibale Fiocchi (29 July 1915 – August 2011) was an Italian architect, known for his work with Olivetti and for his contribution to the post-war development of Ivrea, Italy.

== Life and career ==
Fiocchi was born in Milan in 1915 and graduated in architecture from the Polytechnic University in 1939. In the same year he won the Camillo Boito competition for the design of a theatre and the Luigi Canonica competition for a municipal planning project in Milan.

From 1947 to 1954 Fiocchi was head of the Architecture Office of Olivetti in Ivrea, where he worked on several projects connected with the company's industrial and social development. In 1951 he received the gold medal at the Milan Triennial for the urban plan of the Canton Vesco district in Ivrea, designed in collaboration with Marcello Nizzoli.

Among his main works are the ICO Olivetti factories in Ivrea (1949, with Luigi Figini and Gino Pollini), the housing projects for Olivetti employees (1950–1953), and the Olivetti Office buildings in Milan (1951–1954) and Ivrea (1955–1964), designed with Nizzoli and Gian Antonio Bernasconi. He was also among the architects involved by Eni in the development of Metanopoli, the company town in San Donato Milanese planned from the 1950s.

Fiocchi died in August 2011.

== Selected works ==
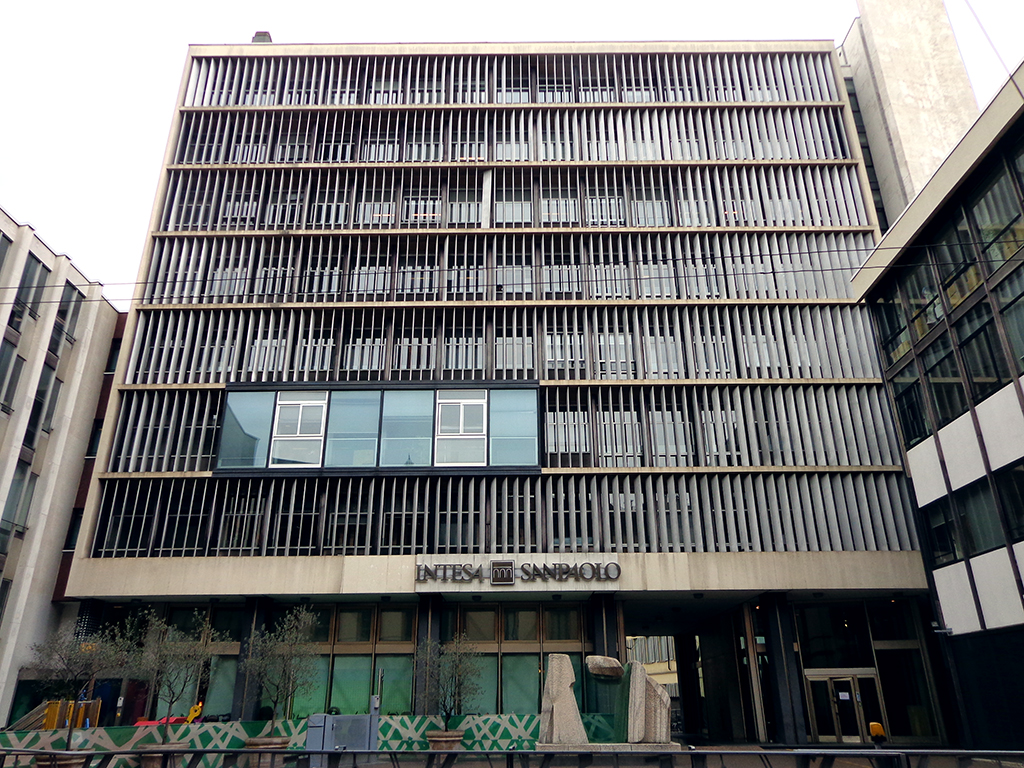
The Olivetti Office Building in Milan

- Canton Vesco district, Ivrea (1948–1957, with Marcello Nizzoli)
- Third expansion of the ICO Olivetti factories, Ivrea (1949, with Luigi Figini and Gino Pollini)
- Housing for Olivetti employees, Ivrea (1950–1953)
- Olivetti Office Building, Milan (1951–1954, with Nizzoli and Gian Antonio Bernasconi)
- Villa Casana extension, Ivrea (1954)
- Offices of Industrie Mazzucchelli, Castiglione Olona (1955–1958)
- Olivetti Office Building, Ivrea (1955–1964, with Nizzoli and Bernasconi)
- Varese Shoe Factory, Varese (1960–1965)
- Church and parish complex of the Beata Vergine del Rosario, Castiglione Olona (1968)

== Sources ==
- Olivetti: una storia industriale. Milan: Electa. 1988.
- Ciagà, Graziano Luigi, ed. (2003). Gli archivi di architettura in Lombardia. Censimento delle fonti. Milan: Centro di Alti Studi sulle Arti Visive.
- Gibello, Luca; Sudano, Paolo Mauro (2007). Annibale Fiocchi architetto. Florence: Aiòn Edizioni. ISBN 978-88-88149-44-8.
