= Villa Capellaro =

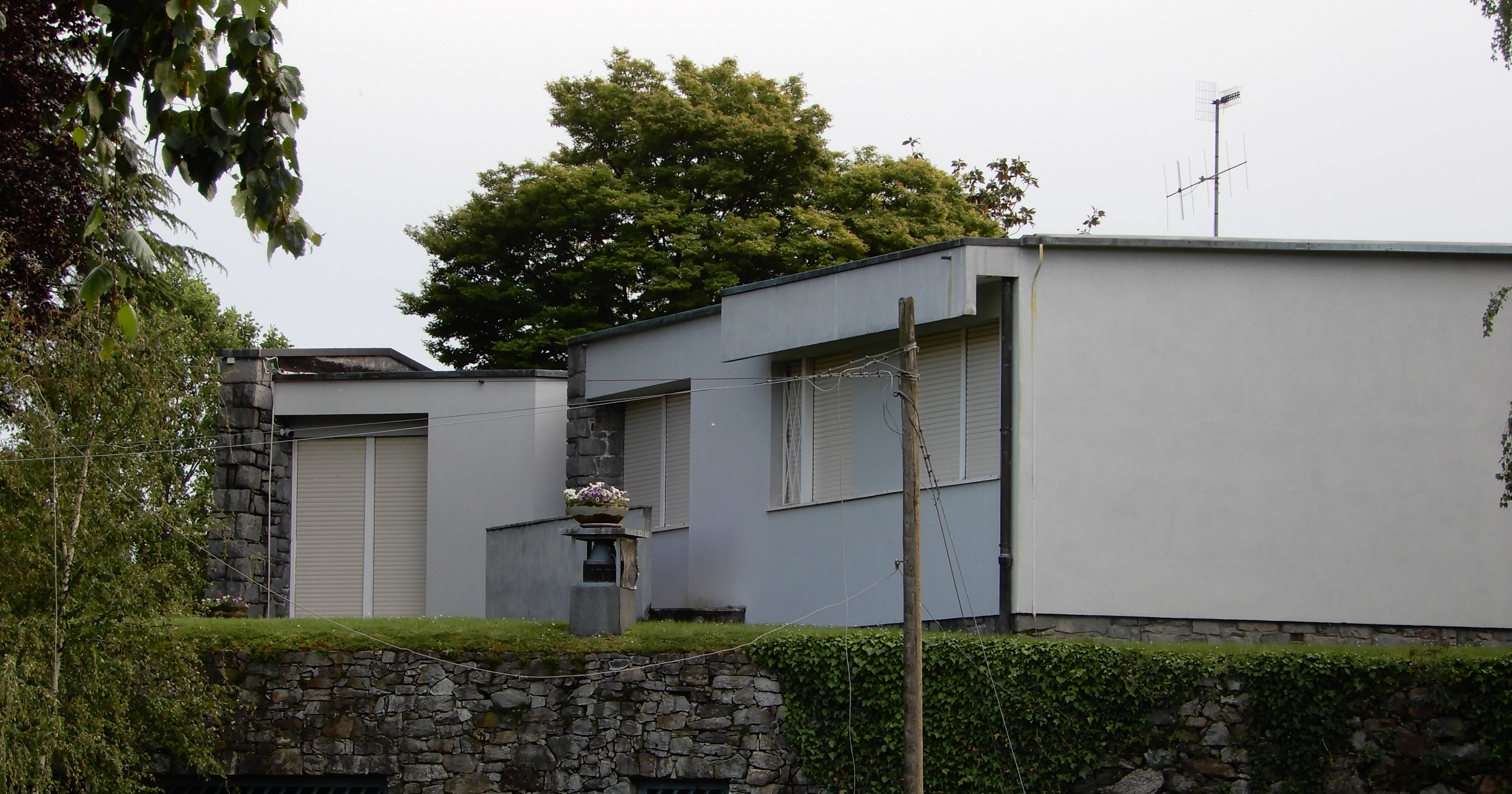
- Villa Capellaro in 2020
- Click on the map for a fullscreen view

General information
- Location: Ivrea, Italy
- Coordinates: 45°27′31.37″N 7°51′56.06″E

Design and construction
- Architects: Marcello Nizzoli, Gian Mario Oliveri

Villa Capellaro is a villa located in Ivrea, Italy. It is part of the Olivetti complex in Ivrea, which has been designated as a UNESCO World Heritage site under the name Ivrea, Industrial City of the 20th Century.

== History ==
The villa was designed between 1953 and 1955 by Marcello Nizzoli and Gian Mario Oliveri. Built for Olivetti's engineer Natale Capellaro, the villa is part of a group of residences intended to house Olivetti's executive staff and their families.

== Description ==
The building is located on Via Pinchia, a short distance from the former Olivetti factories and offices.

The building is the result of a complex exploration of volumetric composition, further emphasized by the different solutions adopted for the treatment of the façades, using stone and plaster.
