= Metanopoli =

Neighbourhood in San Donato Milanese, Italy

- Neighbourhood
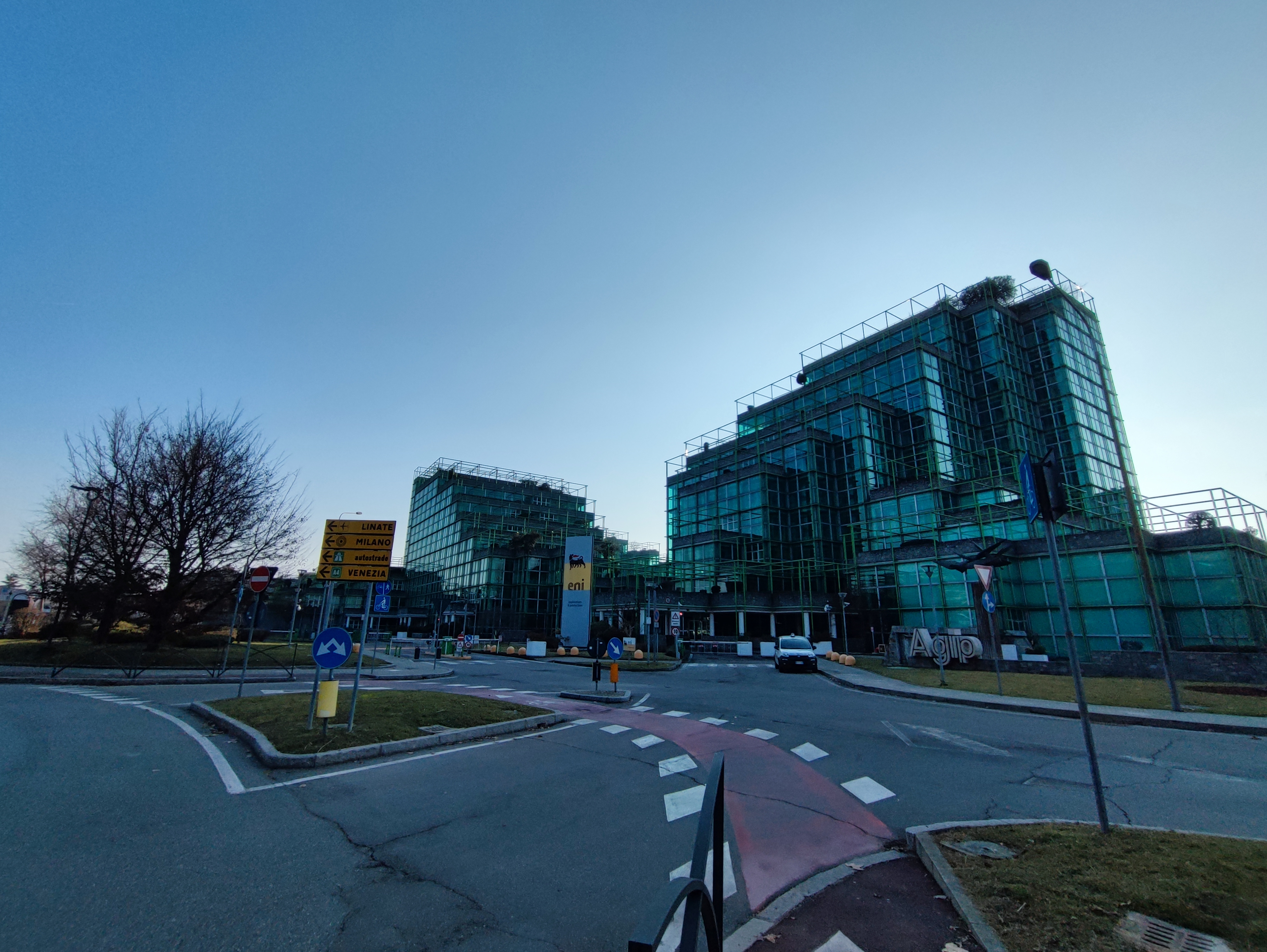
- Interactive map of Metanopoli
- Coordinates: 45.4203°N 9.2576°E
- Country: Italy
- Region: Lombardy
- Metropolitan city: Milan
- Municipality: San Donato Milanese
- Founded: 1952
- Founder: Enrico Mattei
- Named for: Eni
- Postal code: 20097
- Area code: +39 02

Metanopoli ("Gas Town") is a neighbourhood of San Donato Milanese, in the Metropolitan City of Milan, Lombardy, Italy. It was established from 1952 as a planned community for the employees of the energy company Eni, under the leadership of Enrico Mattei.

The master plan was designed by architect Mario Bacciocchi as a garden city integrating residential, social and productive functions. Unlike many industrial settlements of the period, Metanopoli was created as a new urban development rather than as an expansion of an existing settlement. Its urban structure was based on flexible planning, with large green areas and future expansion areas. The landscape design of the green spaces was developed by Pietro Porcinai.

Between 1965 and 1975, architects Marco Bacigalupo and Ugo Ratti developed further integrated urban plans, including the general urban plan of San Donato Milanese (1968–1970) and a residential and tertiary development plan (1972), extending beyond Eni-owned areas. In the 1990s, proposals for the redevelopment of Metanopoli included the "Business District" project by Kenzo Tange (1991) and a wider urban regeneration plan involving architects such as Mario Bellini, Vittorio Gregotti, Antonio Monestiroli and Gino Valle (1999).

The neighbourhood includes several significant examples of post-war Italian architecture, including houses by Vittorio Gandolfi (1956-1957), the church of Santa Barbara designed by Bacciocchi (1955) and the church of Sant'Enrico by Ignazio Gardella (1962–1966). Later developments included office buildings for Snam, designed by architects Marcello Nizzoli, Giuseppe Mario Oliveri, Annibale Fiocchi, Franco Albini, Franca Helg, Mario Terzaghi, Augusto Magnaghi, Roberto Gabetti, and Aimaro Isola. In January 2026, a new Eni headquarters complex designed by Thom Mayne and Morphosis Architects was inaugurated in Metanopoli.

== See also ==
- Società Sportiva Metanopoli

== Sources ==
- Sermisoni, Silvana (1995). Sermisoni, Silvana (ed.). Metanopoli. Attualità di un'idea. Milan: SNAM.
- Fiano, Elena; Guidarini, Stefano (May 1999). "Domus, Snam e Metanopoli". Domus (851): 123–130.
- Magni, Francesco (2011). Lo studio Bacigalupo Ratti e l'ENI (1955-1980). Rappresentazione della modernità ed etica della professione. Milan: FrancoAngeli.
