= Olivetti Office Building =

- Palazzo Uffici Olivetti
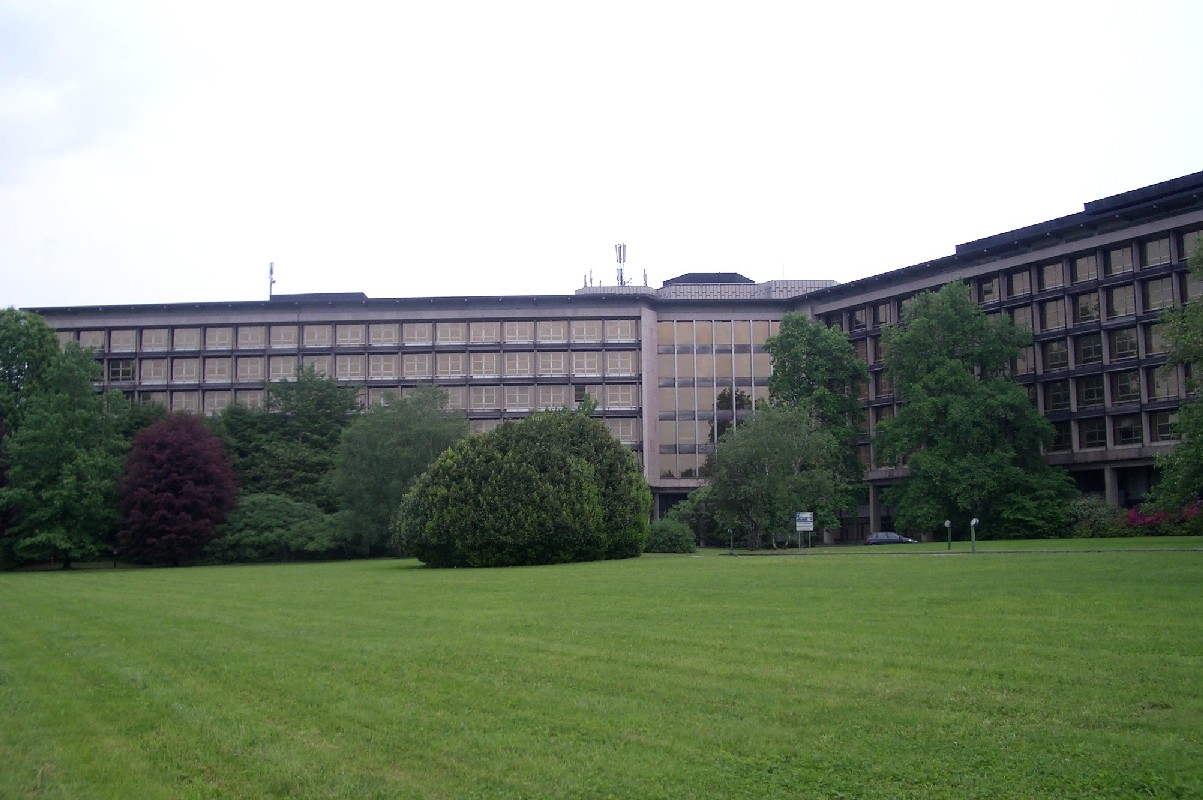
- Olivetti Office Building in 2005
- Click on the map for a fullscreen view

General information
- Architectural style: International Style
- Location: Ivrea, Italy
- Coordinates: 45°27′12.8″N 7°51′53.8″E

The Olivetti Office Building (Italian: Palazzo Uffici Olivetti) is a building located in Ivrea, Italy. It is part of the Olivetti complex in Ivrea, which has been designated as a UNESCO World Heritage site under the name 'Ivrea, Industrial City of the 20th Century'.

== History ==
The building was built by the Olivetti company of Ivrea between 1960 and 1964 and designed by architects Annibale Fiocchi, Gian Antonio Bernasconi, and Marcello Nizzoli. Its construction met the company's need, during a period of significant industrial expansion, for a representative headquarters.

== Description ==
The building, which reflects the forms of the International Style, has a star-shaped plan with three wings hinged at 120 degrees to a central block. This central block serves as the core of the structure and houses service areas along with a grand hexagonal staircase, topped by a large Murano glass skylight.

== Gallery ==
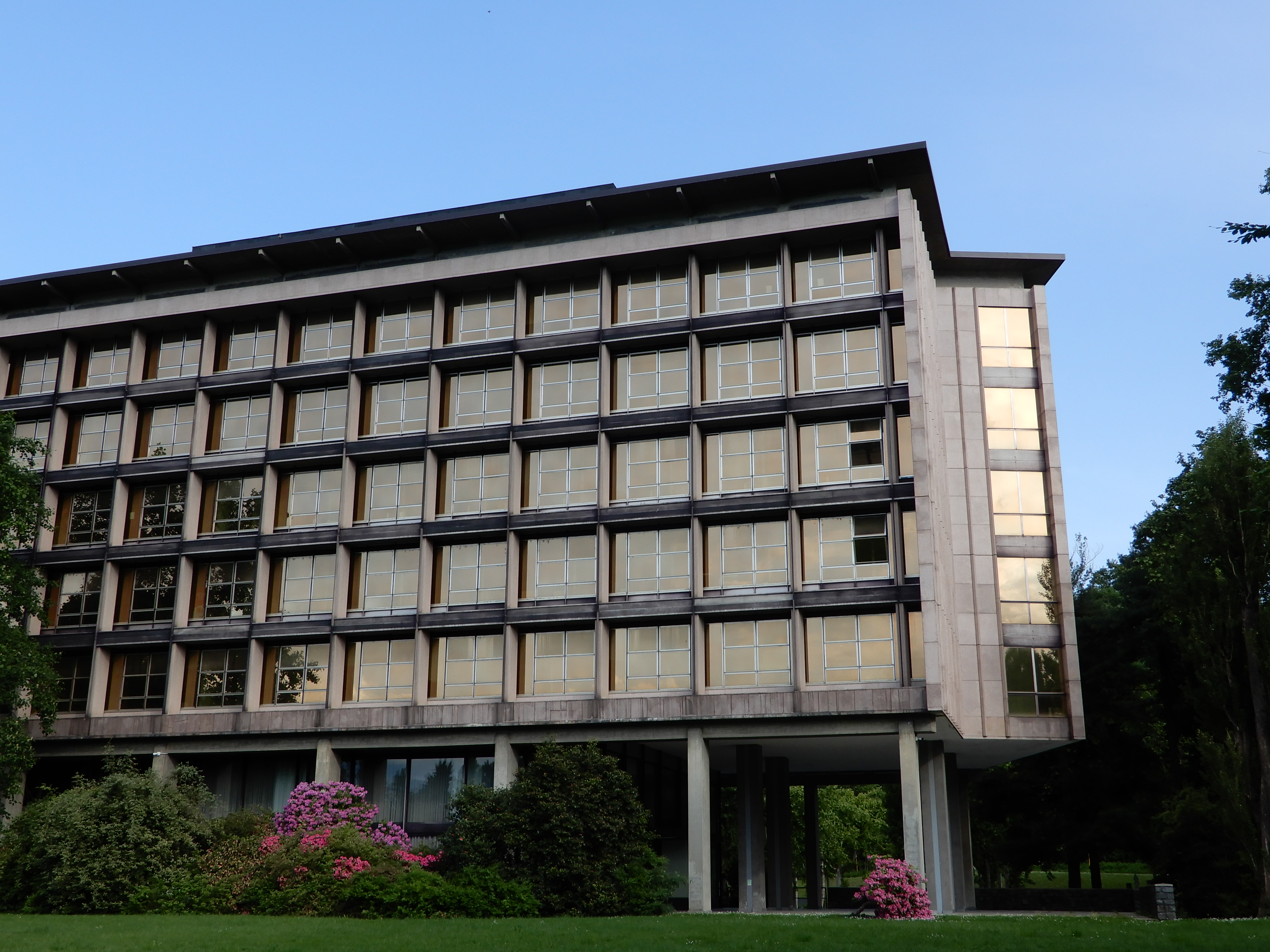

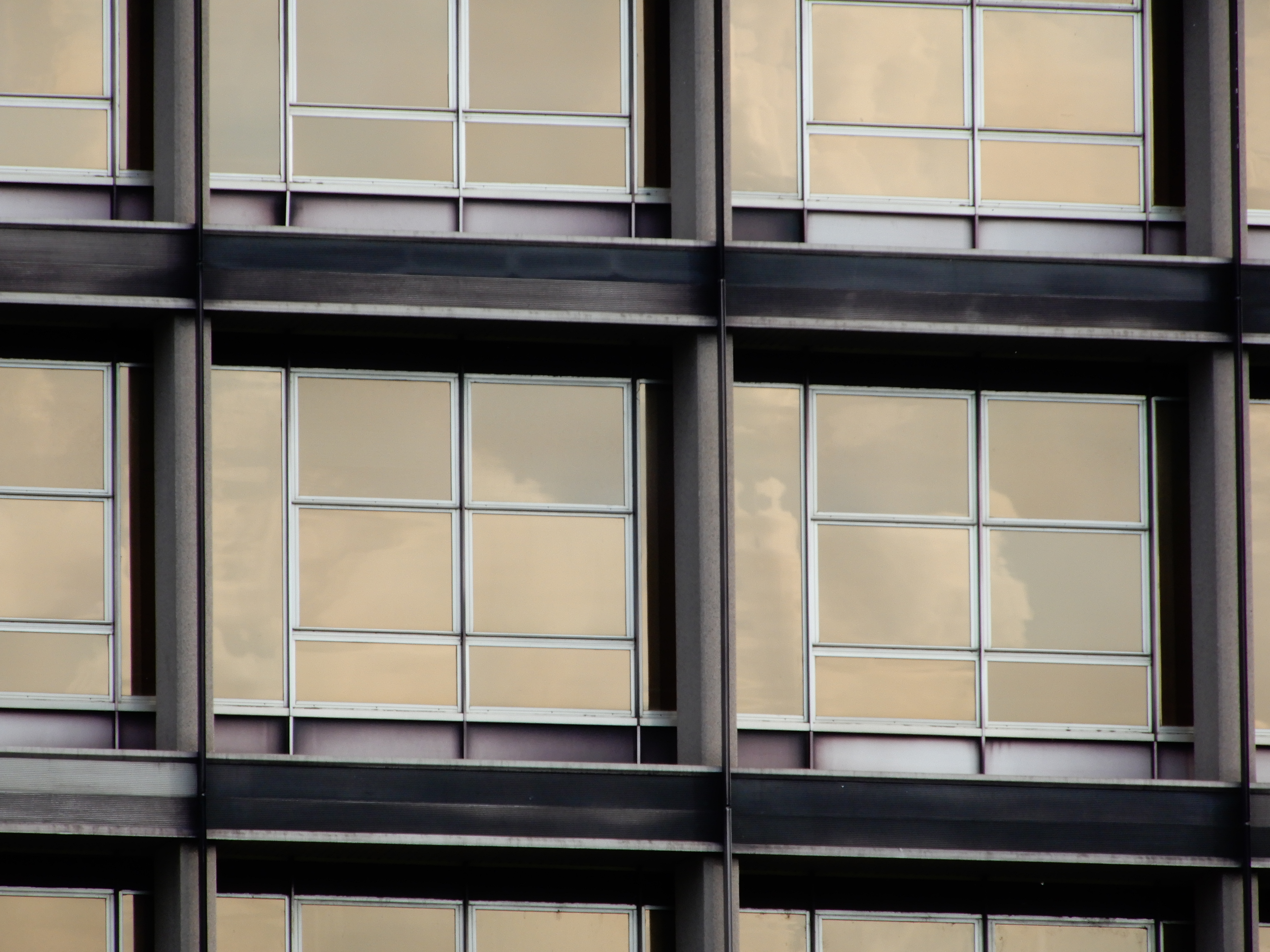

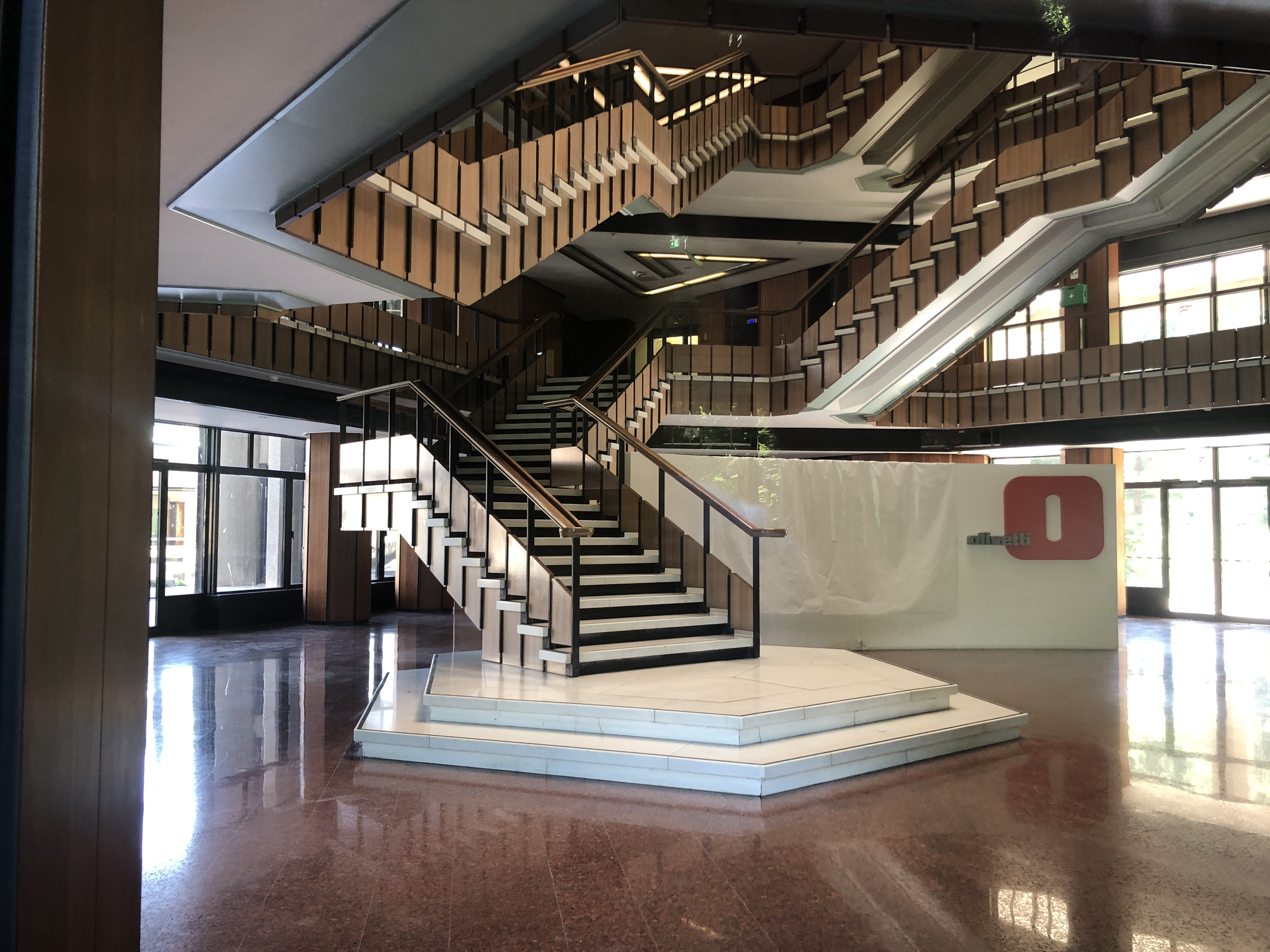
