= Gian Antonio Bernasconi =

Italian architect and architectural journalist

- Born: 21 June 1911; Milan, Kingdom of Italy
- Died: 1991 (aged 79–80)
- Education: Polytechnic University of Milan
- Occupations: Architect, journalist

Gian Antonio Bernasconi (21 June 1911 – 1991) was an Italian architect, architectural journalist and academic. He served as director of the Olivetti Architecture Office and was chief editor of Casabella from 1965 to 1970.

== Life and career ==
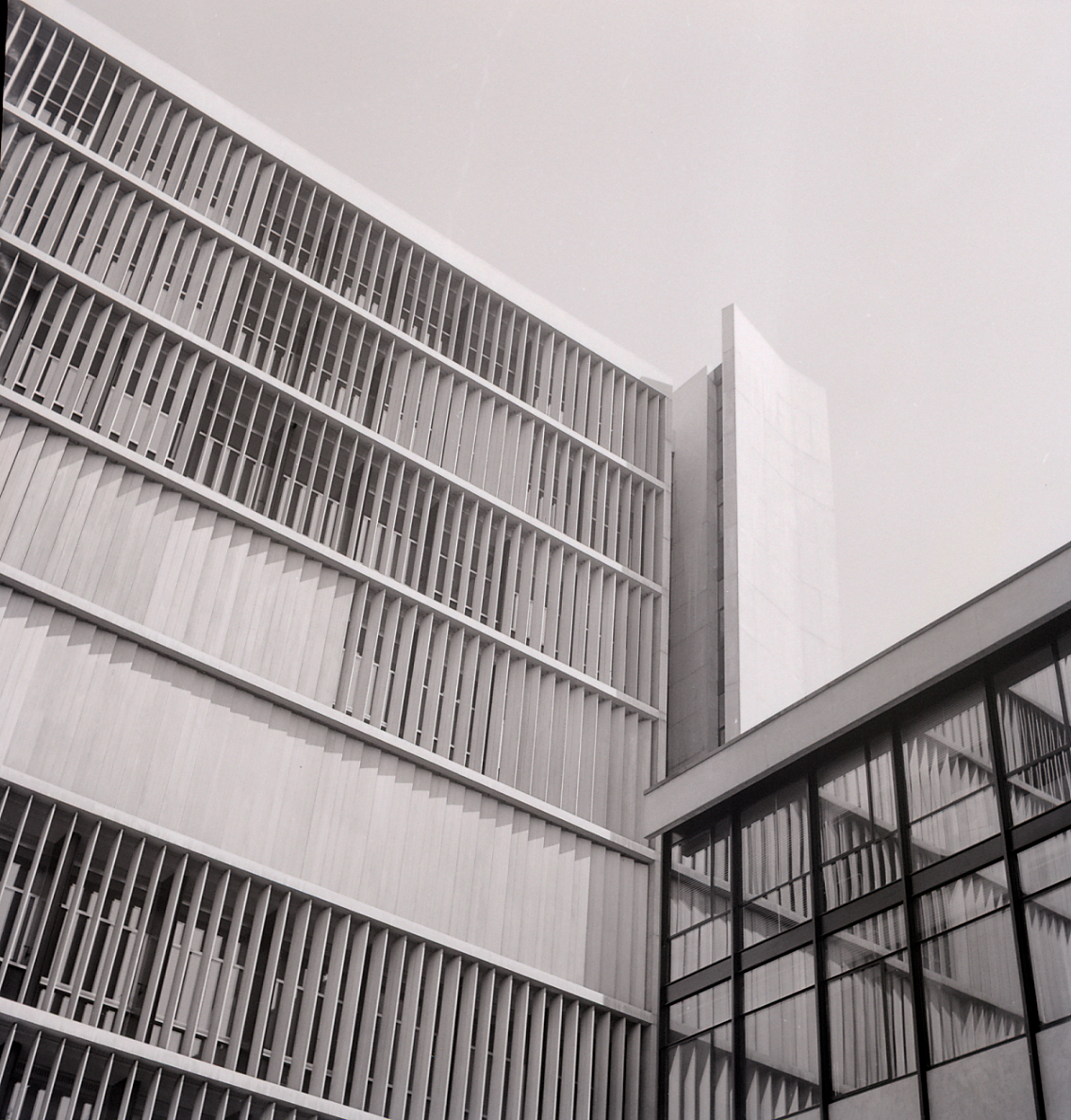
The Olivetti Office Building in Milan, photographed by Paolo Monti in 1960

Born in Milan, Bernasconi graduated in architecture from the Polytechnic University in 1936. He began collaborating with Adriano Olivetti in 1938 and became director of the Olivetti Architecture Office in 1945.

Among his best-known works are the Olivetti Office Buildings in Milan (1951–1954) and in Ivrea (1960–1963), both designed with Marcello Nizzoli and Annibale Fiocchi. He later worked on industrial, commercial and urban planning projects in Italy and abroad, often in collaboration with his brother Emiliano. Other notable works include the Volpiano refinery and the Petroleum House in Cairo. In 1957, he received the International Architecture Prize at the 4th São Paulo Art Biennial in Brazil.

Bernasconi taught architectural composition at several Italian universities and served as director of the architectural magazine Casabella between 1965 and 1970.

== Selected works ==
- Olivetti Office Building, Milan (1951–1954)
- Altimani headquarters, Milan (1955–1957)
- Olivetti Office Building, Ivrea (1960–1963)
- Volpiano refinery (1971)
- Petroleum House, Cairo (1977)
- Cassa di Risparmio di Pistoia e Pescia service complex (1976–1980)
- Cassa di Risparmio di Lucca (1982–1985)

== Sources ==
- Astarita, Rossano (2000). Gli architetti di Olivetti: una storia di committenza industriale. Milan: Franco Angeli.
- Bonifazio, Patrizia; Scrivano, Paolo (2001). Olivetti costruisce: architettura moderna a Ivrea. Milan: Skira.
- De Seta, Cesare (1981). L'architettura del Novecento. Turin: UTET. p. 287.
