= Baldessari =

Baldessari is a surname. Notable people with the surname include:

- Horacio Baldessari (born 1958), Argentine footballer
- Irene Baldessari (born 1993), Italian middle-distance runner
- John Baldessari (1931–2020), American conceptual artist
- Luciano Baldessari (1896–1982), Italian artist, architect, and designer
