= Quartiere Feltre =

Coordinates: 45°29′21″N 9°14′45″E

- Quartiere of Milan
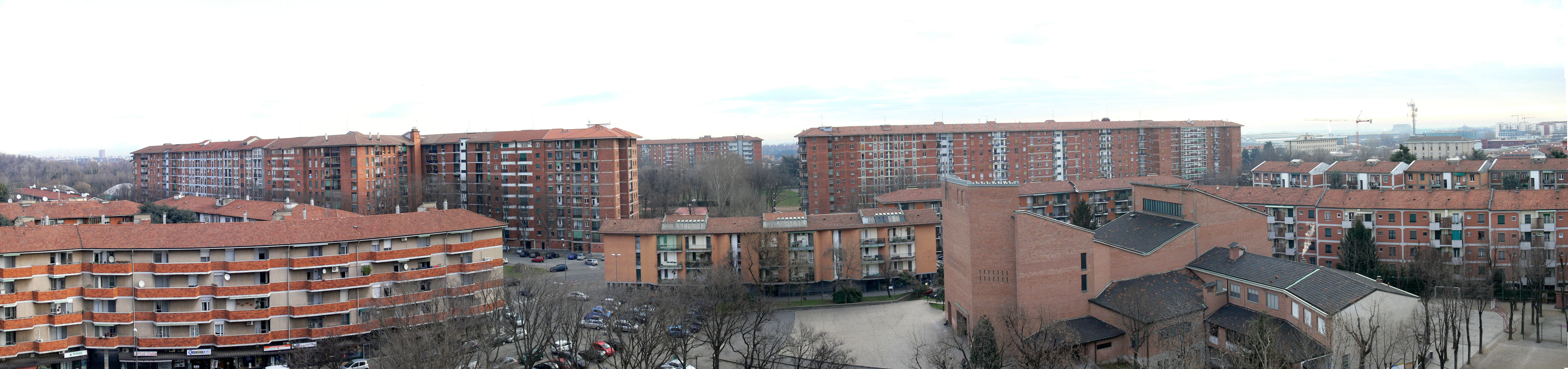
- Interactive map of Quartiere Feltre
- Country: Italy
- Region: Lombardy
- Province: Milan
- Comune: Milan
- Zone: 3
- Time zone: UTC+1 (CET)
  - Summer (DST): UTC+2 (CEST)

Quartiere Feltre is a residential district ("quartiere") of Milan, Italy. It is located in the Zone 3 administrative division, extending east of the city centre, adjacent to the districts of Lambrate and Cimiano, the Lambro river and the Tangenziale Est ring road. It is named after Via Feltre, a large suburban street that connects Milan to the Parco Lambro city park.

The district mainly comprises large apartment blocks, built in the late 1950s with state subsidies. The leading architects involved in the realization of this residential area were Gino Pollini, Mario Bacciocchi, Luciano Baldessari, Ignazio Gardella, Giancarlo De Carlo, Gianluigi Giordani, Angelo Mangiarotti, Mario Terzaghi, Pier Attilio Troilli, and Tito Varisco Bassanesi. Two main types of apartment blocks were realized, respectively 4-floor and 9-floor high. The 4-floor buildings are located in the centre of the district, where most shops and public services are found, while the taller builinds are located in the district's periphery.

== Sources ==
- Edilizia sovvenzionata a Milano, "Urbanistica", 1958, 24/25 (in Italian).
