= La Spezia Courthouse =

Judiciary building in La Spezia, Italy

- Interactive map of the La Spezia Courthouse area

General information
- Location: La Spezia, Liguria, Italy
- Coordinates: 44°6′47.09″N 9°50′19.90″E
- Construction started: 1990
- Completed: 1994

Design and construction
- Architects: Ignazio Gardella, Eugenio Vugi

The La Spezia Courthouse (Italian: Palazzo di Giustizia della Spezia, lit. 'Palace of Justice of La Spezia') is a judicial complex located on Viale Italia in La Spezia, Italy.

== History ==
The Court of La Spezia, established in 1923 alongside the Province, had its first headquarters in a building on Piazza Cesare Battisti, which was later heavily damaged by bombing during World War II. After being relocated to provisional buildings, starting from 1963, the planning phase began to provide the Court and judicial offices with an adequate building.

Architect Ignazio Gardella, one of the leading figures of Modern architecture in Italy, was commissioned to design the new courthouse, working on the project with architect Eugenio Vugi. After many years of revisions, reconsiderations, and interruptions, the new courthouse was finally inaugurated in 1994.

== Description ==
The exterior facades of the building are characterized by alternating bands of Carrara marble and plaster with brick dust. The eaves line is capped by a sturdy terminal band. The building's cubic volume appears supported by a perimeter row of black columns resting on a base plinth covered with marble.

The ground floor, entirely colonnaded and open except for the internal courtyard, the building entrances, and the shops, constitutes a covered, paved square in stone.

The building, with a square plan measuring 55 meters per side and an internal courtyard of 22 meters per side, has four floors for courtrooms (which are taller) and five floors dedicated to offices and archives.

== Sources ==
- Marco Casamonti, ed. (2006). Ignazio Gardella architetto 1905-1999. Costruire la modernità. Milan: Electa. p. 194.
- Francesco Dal Co (1997). Storia dell'architettura Italiana. Il secondo Novecento (1945-1996). Milan: Electa. p. 129.
- Giovanna Franco; Stefano Francesco Musso (2016). Architetture in Liguria dopo il 1945. Genoa: De Ferrari. p. 294.
- Ignazio Gardella (September 1995). "Palazzo di Giustizia di La Spezia, Italia" (PDF). Zodiac (14): 90–99.
- Carlo Olmo (2003). Dizionario di architettura del XX secolo. Turin: Umberto Allemandi & C. p. 840.
