= Vito Latis =

Italian architect (1912–1996)

- Born: 29 July 1912; Florence, Kingdom of Italy
- Died: 3 January 1996 (aged 83); Albavilla, Province of Como, Italy
- Education: Polytechnic University of Milan
- Occupation: Architect

Vito Latis (29 July 1912 – 3 January 1996) was an Italian architect, urban planner and designer. He was one of the protagonists of post-war architecture in Milan and co-founder of Studio Latis together with his brother Gustavo.

== Life and career ==
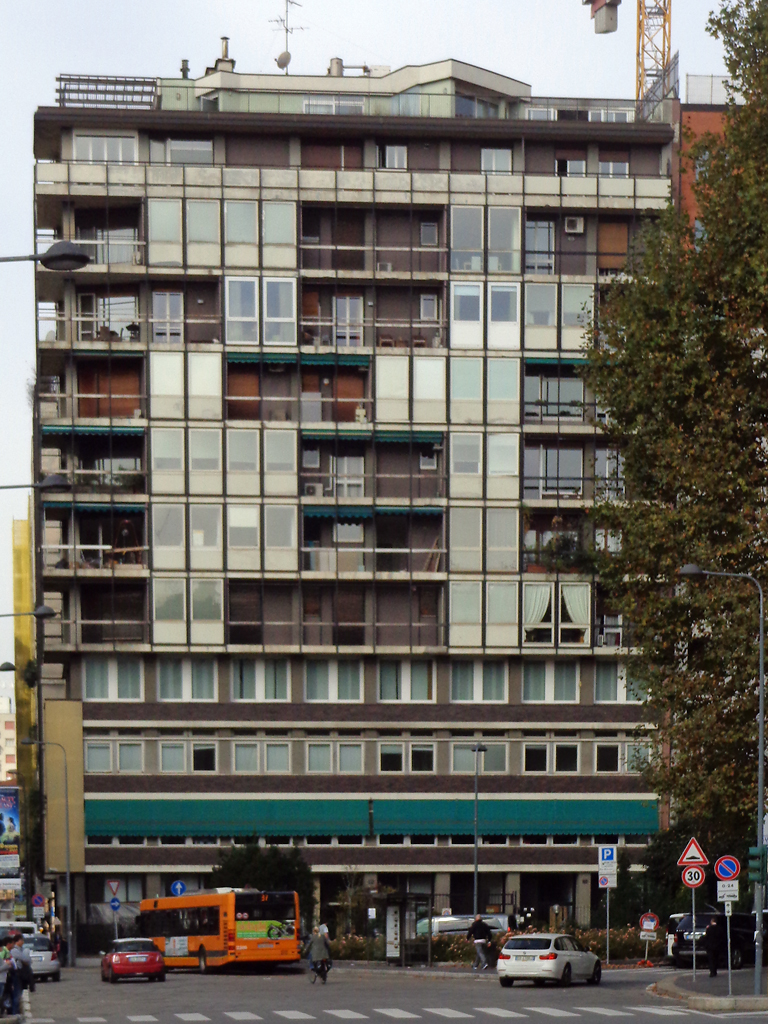
Building on Piazza della Repubblica, Milan (1954–1955)

Born in Florence in 1912, Latis graduated in architecture from the Polytechnic University of Milan in 1935, where he later became assistant professor in architectural drawing. In 1936 he founded his own architectural practice and participated in several editions of the Milan Triennial between 1936 and 1954.

During World War II, because of the racial laws introduced by the Fascist regime, Latis was dismissed from the Polytechnic University and sought refuge in Switzerland, where he worked with the Bureau Technique de la Reconstruction in Zurich (1944–1945). After returning to Italy, he participated in the Milan urban planning commission for the new master plan (1947–1948) and became involved in the activities of the Istituto Nazionale di Urbanistica.

In 1952–1953 he served as president of the Movimento di Studi per l'Architettura (MSA). Latis took part in the design of the Vialba I housing district in Milan, built between 1957 and 1960 as part of the INA-Casa housing scheme. The project was developed by a group of architects also including Ezio Cerutti, Pietro Lingeri, Giulio Minoletti, Mario Morini and Mario Tevarotto.

In 1955 Latis expanded his architectural practice by establishing Studio Latis together with his brother Gustavo. The studio also involved their sister Marta, responsible for aspects of interiors and visual design, and the Swedish architect and designer Margareta Tingdal, who joined the practice and married Vito Latis in the same year. The studio worked across residential architecture, industrial buildings, urban planning, interiors and design, becoming an important presence in post-war Milanese architecture. In later decades, the practice continued with the involvement of the Latis family, including architects Elisabetta, Francesco and Giovanna.

Latis' work is characterized by attention to housing, urban integration and the relationship between architecture and social needs.

Latis died in Albavilla, in the province of Como, on 3 January 1996.

== Sources ==
- Capitanucci, Maria Vittoria, ed. (2007). Vito e Gustavo Latis: frammenti di città (in Italian). Milan: Skira.
- Baffa, Matilde, ed. (1995). Il Movimento di Studi per l'Architettura (in Italian). Bari: Laterza.
- Irace, Fulvio (1997). Milano moderna (in Italian). Milan: Motta.
