= Anna Castelli Ferrieri =

Italian architect and designer (1918–2006)

- Born: 6 August 1918; Milan, Italy
- Died: 22 June 2006 (aged 87); Milan, Italy
- Education: Milan Polytechnic Institute
- Occupations: Architect, industrial designer
- Spouse: Giulio Castelli
- Children: daughter, Marial Castelli; and son, Valerio Castelli
- Relatives: Claudio Luti, son in law

Anna Castelli Ferrieri (6 August 1918 – 22 June 2006) was an Italian architect and industrial designer. She is most known for her influence in the use of plastics as a mainstream design material and her cofounding of Kartell, an Italian contemporary furniture company.

== Early life and education ==
Ferrieri was born on 6 August 1918 in Milan, Italy. She was one of the first women to study at Milan Polytechnic University, from which she graduated in 1943 with a degree in architecture. During her studies, Ferrieri was influenced by Italian Rationalist architect Franco Albini, whose work and theory focused on reduction, function, and rigorous beauty. She was also influenced by the simplicity and functionality championed by the Bauhaus school of art, architecture, and design in Germany.

== Career ==
After her studies, from 1946 to 1947, she worked as an editor at the architecture magazine Costruzioni. In 1949, Ferrieri joined her husband, Giulio Castelli, in founding the furniture company Kartell, which would become a leading company in the manufacture of high-quality plastic furniture, lighting, and homewares. Plastic at this time was considered to be an industrial material and was not typically seen inside the home.

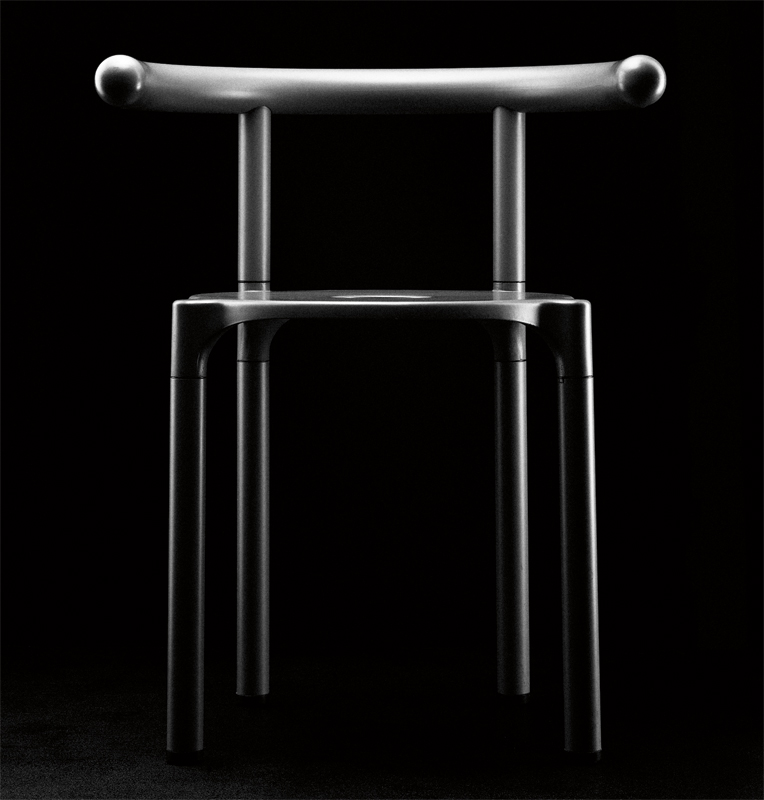
Anna Castelli Chair for Kartell

According to historian Catharine Rossi, Ferrieri experienced problems in partnership due to her trouble in balancing her role as a wife and as an architect designer. She only agreed to work at Kartell, per her husband’s request, after two of his business partners left. As the internal and leading designer at Kartell, Anna Ferreri lead the way for innovative designs that led the company. In the 1960s and 1970s, furniture contributed more growth to the Kartell company over any other divisions of the company. This innovative furniture became the image of the company and the products that represented this image were the colored fitted furniture, the flower boxes, and the stools designed by Anna Castelli Ferrieri. Anna Ferrieri designed the first chair from a single mould in 1968. Anna Castelli Ferrieri laid the Kartell foundations on geometric shapes, bold color, and highly polished finishes.

In 1972, Ferrieri and her husband exhibited artwork in the “Italy: The New Domestic Landscape” exhibition at the Museum of Modern Art in New York. This exhibition featured her “Componobili” of 1969. One of her best known works is the Componibili. Componibilis are stacking module storage pieces. These units have been described as, "Flexible, functional and practical". and as "instantly endearing and slightly futuristic elegance that suits any situation with ease." Today, even after 40 years of production the Componibili is still one of Kartell's best selling furniture items. A more compiled list of all of Ferrieri’s exhibitions are listed below. Ferrieri worked as art director for Kartell from 1976 to 1987, and is most known for her use of materials such as metal and polyurethane. Through her use of plastics, a fairly unused furniture material at the time, she was able to create novel forms that were both elegant and functional. She mediated between creativity of the designers and the needs of the technical project achievability – all while still creating her own designs. Ferrieri married Giulio Castelli and the couple led the way in Italian modern design with Kartell throughout the 60s, 70s and 80s. In addition to her work, she founded and was a member of several organizations including; The Movement of Architecture Studies (MAS) of Milan, 1945; National Institution of Urban Planning (NIU), 1952–1956 and later became president from 1969–1971; Italian Industrial Design Association (IDA) in 1956. She also published two books; one in 1984, “From Project to Product: Plastic and Design”, and the second book was published in 1991, “The Interface of Material”, which explains the responsible behavior on the part of designers. In addition, she also has published a profound list of articles.

== Style, technique, and artwork ==
Ferrieri was a pioneering architect, commonly associated with post war Italian Modern Design. Her design focused on technological innovation through the use of new materials, like plastic. Ferrieri created more than 50 architectural projects, but some of her most famous and iconic works are as follow; the Kartell headquarters (with it being made from brilliant red blocks), a residential building on Via Marchiondi in Milan, and several offices and factories in Alfa Romeo. All of these were created in collaboration with Ignazio Gardella. Although, according to biographer Cristina Morozzi, Gardella took the recognition for projects that Ferrieri worked on because he wanted to be the master of his own studio. In 1982, she created the first table to be made of entirely injection molded plastic. In 1988, she created arm lounge chair that had a “marbleized” injection blend of plastic. Anna Ferrieri won numerous awards, including the Compasso d’Oro, an industrial design award given by ADI to acknowledge and promote high quality designs. However, her work is still in production which speaks the highest praise.

== Exhibitions ==
• Design Italian Style, Hallmark Gallery, New York, 1968 • Italy: The New Domestic Landscape, Museum of Modern Art, New York, 1972• Design and Design, Palazzo delle Stelline, Milan, 1979• Italienisches Moebel Design, Stadtmuseum, Cologne, 1980• Dal Cucchiaio alla Città, Milan Triennale, 1983• Italian Women Designers, Takashimaya Stores, Tokyo, 1985 • Anna Castelli Ferrieri per Kartell, Galliano, Turin, 1985• Anna Castelli Ferrieri at Gallery Modus, Berlin, 1986• Sedersi Kartell, La Rinascente, Milan, 1988• Industrial Elegance, Pacific Design Center, Los Angeles, 1992

== Honors and awards ==
Anna Castelli Ferrieri has a distinguished list of honors and awards that she has received; receiving her first award at the age of 29. She received: • Gold Medals, Milan Triennale, one in 1947 and another in 1950• Oscar Plast Award, London, 1968 Silver Medal Oesterreichisches Bauzentrum, Vienna, 1969• Gold Medal, Monza, 1972; MACEF Award Milan, 1972• Bundespreis Gute Form, West German Government, Bonn, 1973• SMAU Award, Milan, 1977; Product Design Award, Resource Council, New York, 1979 and 1984• Premio Compasso d’Oro Awards, Adi, Milan in 1979 and again in 1987• Design Award, American Societies of Industrial Design, Museum of Art, San Diego, 1981• Gold Medal, BIO9, Llubljana, 1982; Furniture Fair Design Award, Clogne, 1982 and 1987• Industrial Design Magazine Annual Award, New York, 1983• Fine Furniture of the Year Award, Hamburg, 1984.

== Struggles with success ==
Ferrieri openly admitted that working women faced obstacles in the public spheres as well as in the private spheres of life. Anna Ferrieri found that balancing her roles of a designer, wife, and mother were often difficult. During the 1950s through the 1960s, the theme of incompatibility of professional and familial life was a key issue discussed publicly through the newsletter, 8th Pax Romana. The conversation developed into expectations of women and the primary roles as mothers and how these roles influence possibilities for careers. In 1971, one member of the Italian Association of Women Engineers and Architects (Italian: Associazione Italiana Donne Ingegneri e Architetti, or AIDIA), said the biggest obstacle in women’s liberation was family. In the early 1970s, Ferrieri was asked by one of her husband’s aunts to join Soroptimists, which was an international feminist organization. By 1973, she was the president of this organization and presented “International and interdisciplinary action for the promotion of human rights and in particular the condition of women” to the United Nations. Ferrieri became an active feminist and her actions contrasted with other women architects of her time.

== Personal life ==
Anna Castelli Ferrieri (1918–2006) was an Italian pioneering architect. Coming from a family of community members, her father, Enzo Ferrieri, was a well-known journalist, director, and critic of city's legendary Teatro del Convegno; a highly regarded theater company. Her husband, Giulio Castelli, was a chemical engineer and she later became his Kartell business partner. In 1988, the couple sold their company to Claudio Luti, their son in law, and retired. Even after retirement, Ferrieri remained active in the design field. She taught at the Milan Domus Academy from 1987 – 1992. She also took on a variety of commissions, including: “a sofa design for Arflex, a chair for Matteo Grassi, and flatware for Sambonet”

== Death ==
Ferrieri died on 22 June 2006. in her home in Milan, at the age of 87, from complications of lung disease. She was survived by her husband, Giulio Castelli; daughter, Maria Castelli; and son, Valerio Castelli. Giulio Castelli died four months later at the age of 86.
