= Giuseppe Mario Oliveri =

Italian architect and designer (1921–2007)

- Born: 28 January 1921; Palermo, Kingdom of Italy
- Died: June 19, 2007 (aged 86); Milan, Italy
- Education: Polytechnic University of Milan
- Occupations: Architect, designer

Giuseppe Mario Oliveri (28 January 1921 – 19 June 2007) was an Italian architect and industrial designer associated with the work of Marcello Nizzoli and the development of postwar Italian architecture and design.

== Life and career ==
Born in Palermo, Oliveri studied decorative arts before serving in the Italian military during World War II. He later studied architecture, completing his degree at the Polytechnic University of Milan in 1950. In 1948 he joined the studio of architect and designer Marcello Nizzoli, contributing to projects for Olivetti, including office buildings and housing for company employees in Ivrea, and for Eni, including Metanopoli.

After Nizzoli reduced his architectural practice in the early 1960s, Oliveri became one of the founders of Nizzoli Associati in 1965 together with Alessandro Mendini and Paolo Viola. The multidisciplinary practice combined architecture, urban planning, graphic design and industrial design. During this period Oliveri also edited the Industrializzazione dell'edilizia column in Casabella, later expanded into the book Prefabbricazione o metaprogetto edilizio (1968).

Throughout the 1970s and 1980s Oliveri continued to work under the names Nizzoli Sistemi and Studio Nizzoli, designing residential developments, tourist facilities, office buildings and industrial products. Notable projects included the urban plan for the South District of Bratislava (1967), tourist developments at Otranto (1973–1976) and Lignano Sabbiadoro (1977), and the Editoriale Domus headquarters in Rozzano (1980). His work received international recognition, including a Gold Medal at the 1973 BIO exhibition in Ljubljana for a radiator designed for Solar-Saim. Several of his industrial designs entered museum collections, including those of the Design Museum in London, the Milan Triennial and the Centre Pompidou in Paris.

In 1992 Oliveri was appointed professor of architectural technology at the University of Palermo. A retrospective of his work, G. Mario Oliveri e gli Studi Nizzoli. Architecture and Design – Since 1948, was held at the Casa della Cultura in New York in 2001.

Oliveri died in Milan on 19 June 2007.

== Sources ==
- Gravagnuolo, Benedetto, ed. (1983). Gli Studi Nizzoli. Architettura e design 1948–1983. Milano.
- Spinelli, Luigi, ed. (2001). Giuseppe Mario Oliveri e gli Studi Nizzoli. Architecture and Design – Since 1948. Rozzano.
