= Mario Terzaghi =

Italian architect and designer (1915–1998)

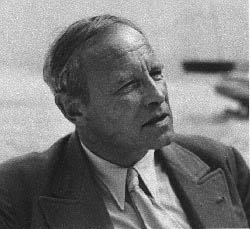
- Born: 13 July 1915; Florence, Kingdom of Italy
- Died: 26 December 1998 (aged 83); Milan, Italy
- Education: Polytechnic University of Milan
- Occupations: Architect, designer

Mario Terzaghi (13 July 1915 – 26 December 1998) was an Italian architect and designer. He was one of the protagonists of postwar Milanese architecture and was known especially for public housing, educational and healthcare buildings, as well as industrial design. He worked for many years in partnership with architect Augusto Magnaghi.

== Life and career ==
Born in Florence, Terzaghi studied architecture at the Polytechnic University of Milan, where he met Augusto Magnaghi, with whom he established a long-lasting professional partnership. During his studies he trained at the studio of Giuseppe Terragni and Pietro Lingeri, and in 1941 he joined the Gruppo Primordiale Futurista Sant'Elia, a futurist movement inspired by Antonio Sant'Elia.

After World War II, Magnaghi and Terzaghi became active in postwar reconstruction, focusing on public housing, schools, healthcare buildings and industrial architecture. Their work included projects for the INA-Casa housing programme, such as the Cairate workers' village (1950), and major neighbourhoods including the Comasina (1953–1963) and the Feltre (1957–1963) districts in Milan. They also designed schools, churches, offices and healthcare facilities in Lombardy, including INAM clinics in Milan, Laveno-Mombello and Cremona.

Terzaghi also worked in industrial and product design. Together with Magnaghi he designed furniture and interiors for companies including SAFFA, Busnelli and Olivari, creating products such as the Talia seating collection and the BICA door handle.

After Magnaghi's death in 1963, Terzaghi continued their architectural practice independently, completing several projects including the Hospital of Magenta (1963–1970), hospital buildings in Calcinate and Legnano, schools, commercial facilities and residential developments.

He died in Milan on 26 December 1998.

== Sources ==
- Feraboli, Maria Teresa (2003). "Augusto Magnaghi e Mario Terzaghi". In Ciagà, Grazia Lidia (ed.). Gli archivi di architettura in Lombardia. Censimento delle fonti. Milan: Comune di Milano.
- Bevilacqua, Francesco (2001). "Mario Terzaghi". In Godoli, Ezio (ed.). Dizionario del futurismo. Vol. 2. Florence: Vallecchi.
