= Olivetti Company Canteen and Recreation Center =

- Mensa Aziendale e Circolo Ricreativo Olivetti
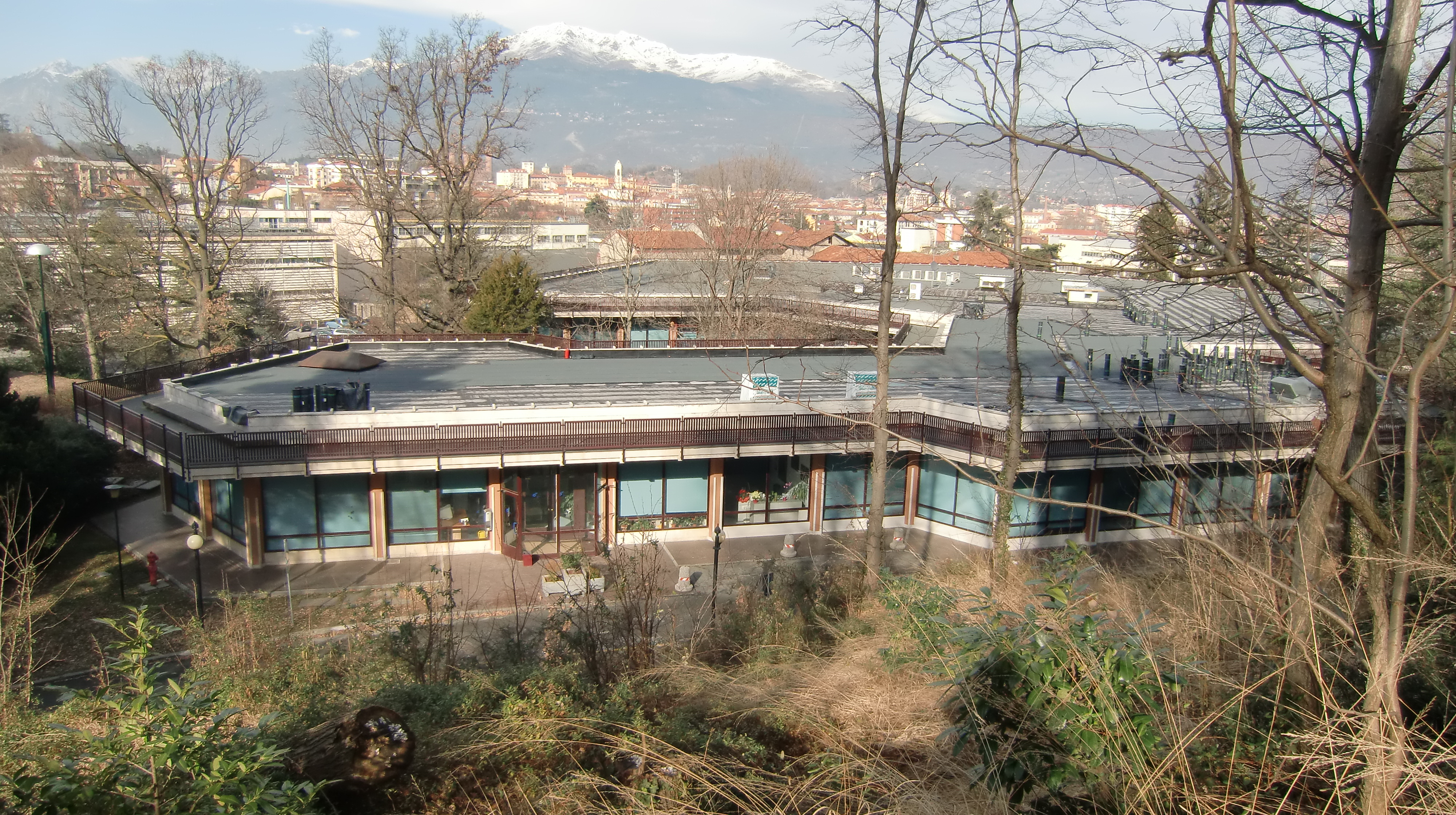
- Olivetti Company Canteen and Recreation Center in 2011
- Click on the map for a fullscreen view

General information
- Location: Ivrea, Italy
- Coordinates: 45°27′28.8″N 7°52′31.08″E

Design and construction
- Architects: Ignazio Gardella, Roberto Guiducci

The Olivetti Company Canteen and Recreation Center (Italian: Mensa Aziendale e Circolo Ricreativo Olivetti) is a building located in Ivrea, Italy. It is part of the Olivetti complex in Ivrea, which has been designated as a UNESCO World Heritage site under the name Ivrea, Industrial City of the 20th Century.

== History ==
The Olivetti company first introduced a workers' canteen as early as 1936. Initially, the service was located in the basement of one wing of the factory, and meals were distributed on a self-service basis, highly innovative for the time, using a meal voucher payment system.

During the Second World War, the canteen was also opened to employees' family members. In the post-war period, the spaces became insufficient due to the increase in staff. In the 1950s, the search for a new location began, and the choice fell on a green area at the foot of the hill behind the factory complex.

The design of the building, entrusted to Ignazio Gardella, began in 1953. The first project also included a cinema, but this was ultimately discarded. The building permit was granted in 1955, while the construction, carried out in collaboration with engineer and urban planner Roberto Guiducci, was completed in 1961.

The building was designed to accommodate up to 1,600 people in its dining hall, serving as many as 9,000 meals daily. Its main atrium provided a versatile space for recreational and cultural activities integrated into factory life, while the upper floors housed additional worker facilities, including rest and reading areas.

== Description ==
The building follows a hexagonal layout and is organized over several levels following the natural contours of the site without any excavation or earthworks, thereby extending the geometric forms of the underlying moraine hill. The central block of the canteen, encircled by wide walkable balconies connected by footbridges and staircases, links the different levels and provides direct access to the hill's green areas and the recreational and rest spaces. The balconies and the large windows, interrupted only by pillars, allow visitors to pause and enjoy the view while being sheltered by the eaves. The design conveys a sense of architectural distinction, with Gardella drawing on Frank Lloyd Wright's influence in its layout, color palette, and material choices.
