= Dan Petrescu (businessman) =

Romanian businessman and billionaire (1953–2021)

- Born: 1953; Bucharest, Romania
- Died: 3 October 2021 (aged 68); San Donato Milanese, Italy
- Education: Politehnica University of Bucharest
- Occupation: Businessman

Dan Petrescu (1953 – 3 October 2021) was a Romanian businessman and billionaire, among the richest people in Romania. Born in 1953 in Bucharest, Petrescu studied at the Politehnica University of Bucharest. After graduating, Petrescu married his wife Regina Dorotea Petrescu Balzat, with whom he had a son, Dan Ștefan Petrescu, and emigrated to West Germany. There, he met who would be his economic partner for years, Ion Țiriac, another Romanian businessman. They were involved in several businesses together and returned to Romania following the Romanian Revolution.

Petrescu later ran various businesses on his own, earning a lot of property and a total wealth of around €3 billion. He was private with his personal life, having never given an interview, and was described as humble. Petrescu, his wife and his son and some friends of his family died on 3 October 2021 following an airplane crash on San Donato Milanese, near Milan, in Italy.

== Biography ==
Dan Petrescu was born in 1953 in Bucharest. After ending his studies at the Politehnica University of Bucharest, Petrescu married and emigrated to West Germany in the 1980s, starting a business in the domain of automobiles in the country. In West Germany, Petrescu met the Romanian businessman and now former tennis player Ion Țiriac, with whom he began to collaborate in tennis-related businesses. Petrescu and Țiriac returned to Romania following the Romanian Revolution, where they continued to be economic partners. Petrescu was involved in the development of companies with Țiriac such as the Ion Țiriac Bank (now UniCredit Bank Romania) or some real estate companies. Eventually, both businessmen split their ways, with Petrescu starting his own business in real estate and car distribution, thus managing to amass a great fortune. Țiriac would later state at several times that Petrescu had a wealth greater than him. As of 2020, Țiriac was the third richest Romanian in the world, and his net worth was of 6 billion Romanian lei on that year.

Petrescu was notable for his confidentiality and for how little was known about him, this being the reason why he was sometimes called the "shadow billionaire" (Romanian: miliardarul din umbră). Petrescu never gave an interview, tried not to stand out and did his business through several offshore companies. He was described as humble and it has been said about Petrescu that "he drove an Opel Vectra for years" and that "you could see him on a scooter on the street and not know who he is". He was jokingly called "Petre Ispirescu" by his friends since "he had an innate talent for telling stories". Petrescu controlled vast extensions of land in Romania, including in the capital Bucharest. He owned 150 apartments in the city, as well as several villas. His companies built dozens of shopping centers, some of which operated Auchan, Carrefour, Metro AG and Real stores. Petrescu used to rent some of the spaces he owned for periods of between 10 and 20 years, which contributed to part of his great fortune. His wealth has been estimated to have been €3 billion. Petrescu held both Romanian and German citizenship.

Petrescu died on 3 October 2021, aged 68, in an airplane crash. He owned a private plane, a Pilatus PC-12, which he bought in 2015 and piloted himself. The plane carried the registration YR-PDV and was registered in Romania, having set off from there on 30 September 2021. It later arrived in Milan, in Italy, and on the day of the crash, it took off from there at 13:03 CEST bound for Olbia, also in Italy, and crashed into an empty building under renovation shortly after on 13:12 CEST on San Donato Milanese, close to Milan. The plane had eight passengers of varying nationalities (mostly Romanian and Italian), all of whom died. Dan Petrescu, his wife Regina Dorotea Petrescu Balzat and their son Dan Ștefan Petrescu died in the crash. Filippo Nascimbene, his wife Claire Stephanie Caroline Alexandrescou, their one-year-old baby boy Raphael Nascimbene and Claire's mother Miruna Anca Wanda Lozinschi, as well as Julien Brossard, a friend of Dan Ștefan Petrescu, also perished in the accident. Following the airplane crash, it was announced that the Romanian businesswoman Anca Surugiu, who had been an assistant and coordinator for all of Petrescu's companies, would take over his fortune.
