= Azienda Nazionale Idrogenazione Combustibili =

Former Italian chemical company

Azienda Nazionale Idrogenazione Combustibili (ANIC) was an Italian chemical company, established during the Fascist regime with the objective of obtaining synthetic gasoline by hydrogenation of brown coal. It was set up in 1936 by state-owned Agip and Montecatini as a joint venture. In 1953, it was acquired by Eni.

== History ==
After the Second Italo-Ethiopian War, in November 1935 Fascist Italy was targeted with sanctions by the League of Nations, an event that induced Italian dictator Benito Mussolini to pursue an economic policy of autarky. At that time, about 75 per cent of Italy's energy requirement was covered by imports, so Mussolini negotiated the acquisition of patents from I.G. Farben and the International Hydrogenation Engineering & Chemical Company in order to start production of synthetic fuels and lubricants from brown coal and heavy Albanian crude. The regime thus organized the set up of a joint venture between Agip and Montecatini in February 1936, that was put in charge of the construction of two new chemical plants in Leghorn, Tuscany and Bari, Apulia. After Anic refineries came on steam, the Italian petrol production rose from 290 thousand tons in 1937 to 520 thousand in 1939.

== See also ==
- Villaggio ANIC
