= 2021 Milan Pilatus PC-12 crash =

2021 aviation accident in Italy

2021 Milan airplane crash
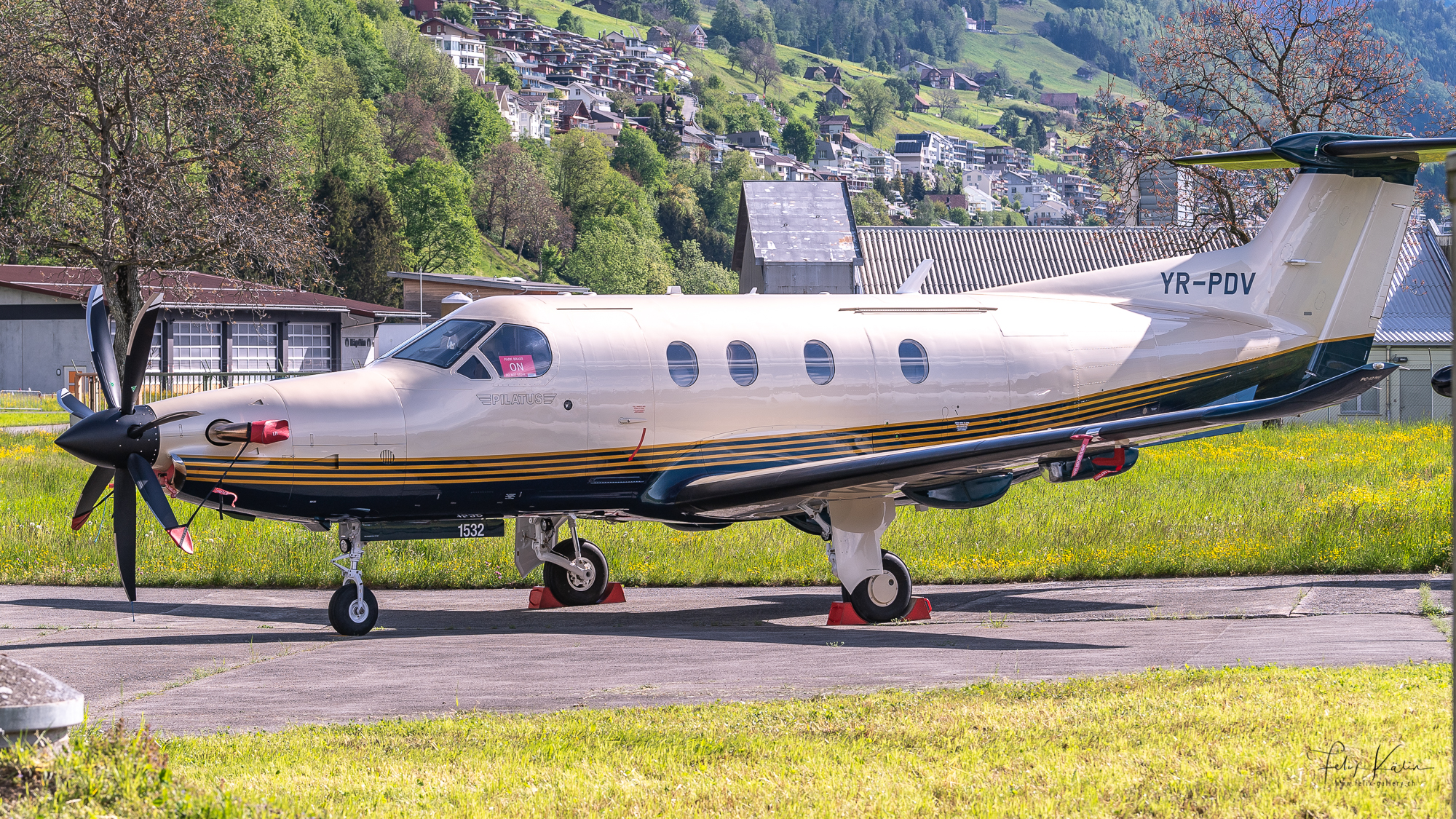
- YR-PDV, the Pilatus PC-12 involved in the accident, photographed on May 2021

Accident
- Date: 3 October 2021
- Summary: Crashed after take-off, possible task saturation
- Site: Milan, Italy; 45.4288°N 9.2545°E

Aircraft
- Aircraft type: Pilatus PC-12/47E
- Registration: YR-PDV
- Flight origin: Linate Airport, Milan, Italy
- Destination: Olbia Costa Smeralda Airport, Olbia, Italy
- Occupants: 8
- Passengers: 6
- Crew: 2
- Fatalities: 8
- Survivors: 0

On 3 October 2021, a Romanian private plane crashed into a building in Milan, Lombardy, Italy. All eight occupants of the aircraft were killed, including the Romanian businessman and billionaire Dan Petrescu, who owned and piloted the plane.

== Incident ==
At 13:03 CEST on 3 October 2021, a small private plane carrying two crew and six passengers departed Milan's Linate Airport destined for Olbia Costa Smeralda Airport on Sardinia, both locations being in Italy. Less than two minutes after take-off, the auto-pilot was disconnected; flying manually while climbing through cloud, the pilot lost control of the aircraft, and it descended rapidly until it crashed into an incomplete building near San Donato station in Milan. All eight on board were killed.

== Aircraft ==
The aircraft was a Pilatus PC-12/47E carrying the registration YR-PDV. It was registered in Romania, and arrived in Milan from Romania on 30 September 2021.

== Victims ==
Eight people were killed during the crash: the Romanian businessman Dan Petrescu, his Romanian–French wife and their son; the others were a family of four: an Italian man, his French wife, their one-year-old child, and the child's Romanian–French maternal grandmother; and a Canadian man who was a mutual friend of both families.

== Investigation ==
On 12 November 2021, all data contained in the lightweight data recorder (LDR) of the plane recovered after its wreck were successfully downloaded at the technological laboratories of the National Agency for the Safety of Flight (ANSV). In-depth and extensive analysis carried out by ANSV of the recovered data highlighted the unavailability of data about the flight or recordings referable to the flight that ended with the accident. In fact, from the maintenance documentation acquired by ANSV, it was discovered that the aforementioned LDR was inefficient even before the flight of the accident.

The ANSV released the final report on June 21, 2024, acknowledging that the loss of data from the lightweight data recorder (LDR) made the determination of cause with certainty impossible. The ANSV proposed that the most likely cause is a loss of control during a SID departure in daylight IMC conditions where the pilot is flying manually, which probably resulted in task saturation and the focus of the pilot probably shifted from basic flight control to navigation. The ANSV believed that a recurring lack of pilot training could also be contributed to the cause.
