= Luciano Baldessari =

Italian architect and scenographer

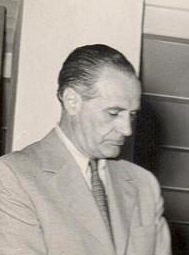
- Born: 10 December 1896; Rovereto
- Died: 26 September 1982 (aged 85); Milan

Luciano Baldessari (1896–1982) was an Italian artist, architect, and designer. Baldessari was born on December 10, 1896, in Rovereto, Italy.

In 1913, Baldessari began his career as a visual artist after studying in the Scuola Reale Elisabettiana. He participated in the Futurist movement among contemporaries including Fortunato Depero. In 1919, Baldessari moved to Milan where he studied architecture at Milan Polytechnic; he completed his degree in 1922.

In 1923 Baldessari moved to Berlin where he worked as a set designer.

In 1926, he returned to Milan and began his career in rationalist architecture. During this period, Baldessari designed a number of influential buildings including the Bernocchi Pavilion at the 10th International Fair of Milan and the Craja Bar in Milan (in collaboration with Luigi Figini, and Gino Pollini, Fausto Melotti and Marcello Nizzoli).

Baldessari died in 1982 in Milan.
