= Pietro Lingeri =

Italian architect (1894–1968)

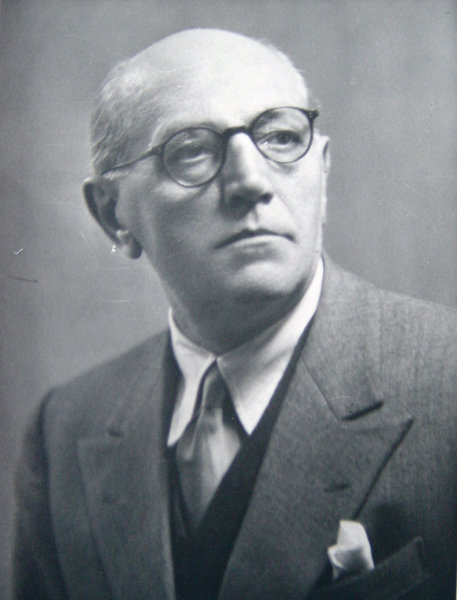
- Born: 25 January 1894; Bolvedro, Tremezzo, Province of Como, Kingdom of Italy
- Died: 15 May 1968 (aged 74); Bolvedro, Tremezzo, Province of Como, Italy
- Education: Brera Academy
- Occupation: Architect

Pietro Lingeri (25 January 1894 – 15 May 1968) was an Italian architect and a prominent figure of Italian Rationalism.

After graduating from the Brera Academy in Milan in 1926, Lingeri became one of the founders of the Movimento Italiano per l'Architettura Razionale (MIAR) in 1930. He collaborated with architects such as Giuseppe Terragni, contributing to several projects of the Italian Rationalist movement, including Casa Rustici in Milan (1935). His work was characterised by the use of modern materials and elements, including reinforced concrete, large glazed surfaces and metal details. After World War II he designed residential buildings, including housing projects for the QT8 and Vialba districts in Milan.
