= Ignazio Gardella =

Italian architect and designer

Ignazio Gardella

Ignazio Gardella (30 March 1905 in Milan, Lombardy – 16 March 1999) was an Italian architect and designer.

== Biography ==
Born into a family of architects, the first of whom was his namesake Ignazio Gardella Sr. (1803–1867). Gardella graduated in engineering from the Politecnico di Milano university in 1928, and later earned a degree in architecture from the Istituto Universitario di Architettura di Venezia (IUAV) in 1949.

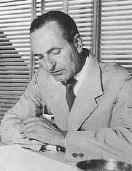
Ignazio Gardella in the Fifties

In his university years he came into contact with other young protagonists of the Milanese scene together with whom he took part in the creation of the Italian Modern Movement.

== Professional activity ==
His long professional activity, which began before his graduation at the end of the 1920s with his father Arnaldo Gardella (1873–1928), produced an enormous quantity of projects and realizations.

== The CIAM ==
In the same years he was a leader of important cultural events, like CIAM (in 1952 he founded, with others, the summer session in Venice; in 1959 he participated in CIAM X in Otterlo in the Netherlands), or the first INU conferences (starting in 1949).

== International maestro ==
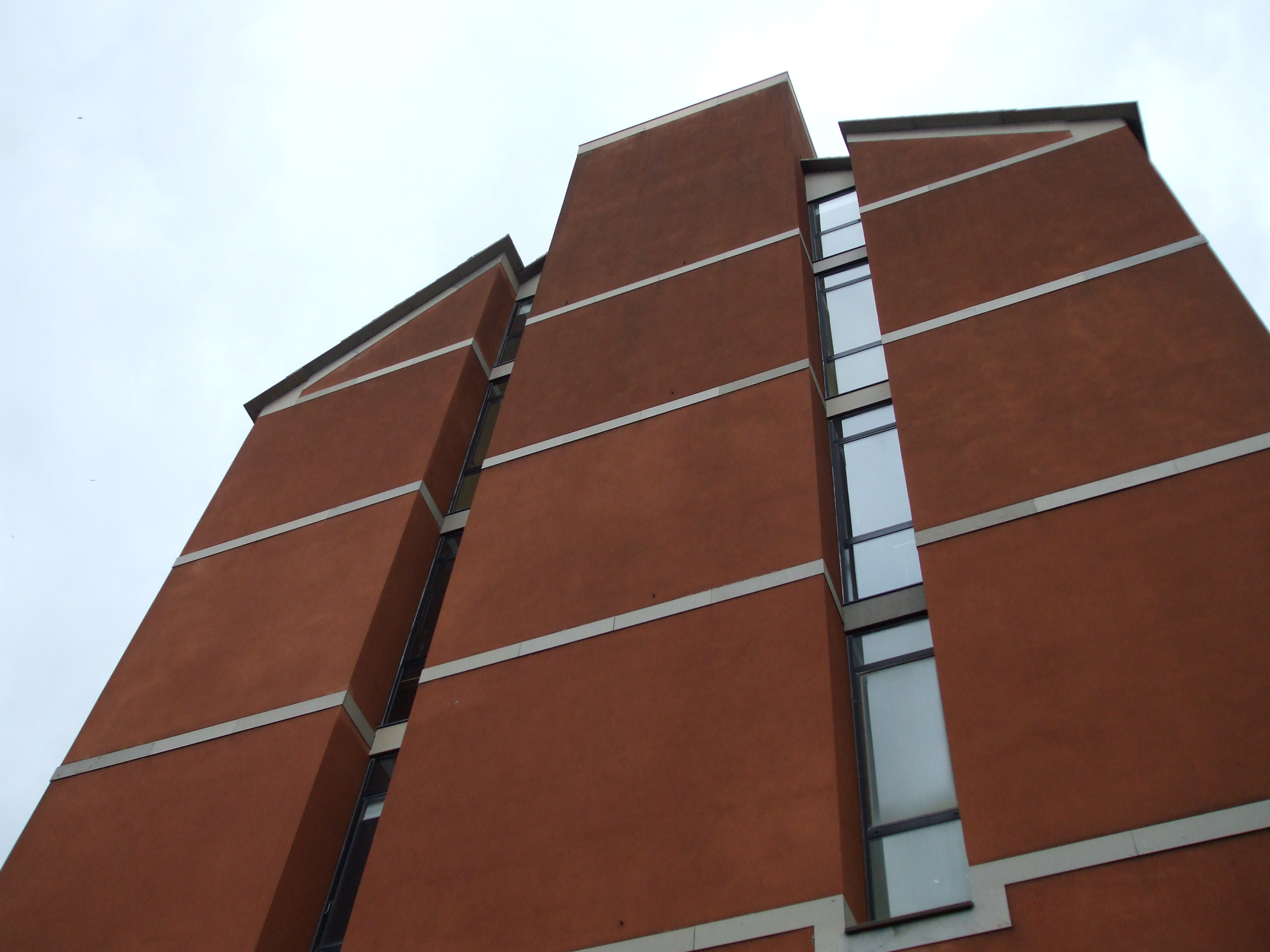
West facade of the Faculty of Architecture of Genoa

The figure of Gardella remained at the pinnacle of Italian architecture for all of the 1960s and '70s, with intense professional activity whose importance is proven by his presence in international publications. In the last phase of his life, Gardella, now among the eminences grises of Italian architecture, still produced significant projects, like the Faculty of Architecture of the University of Genova (1975–1989), which brought him once more to the front lines of the architectural debate.

== The designer activity ==
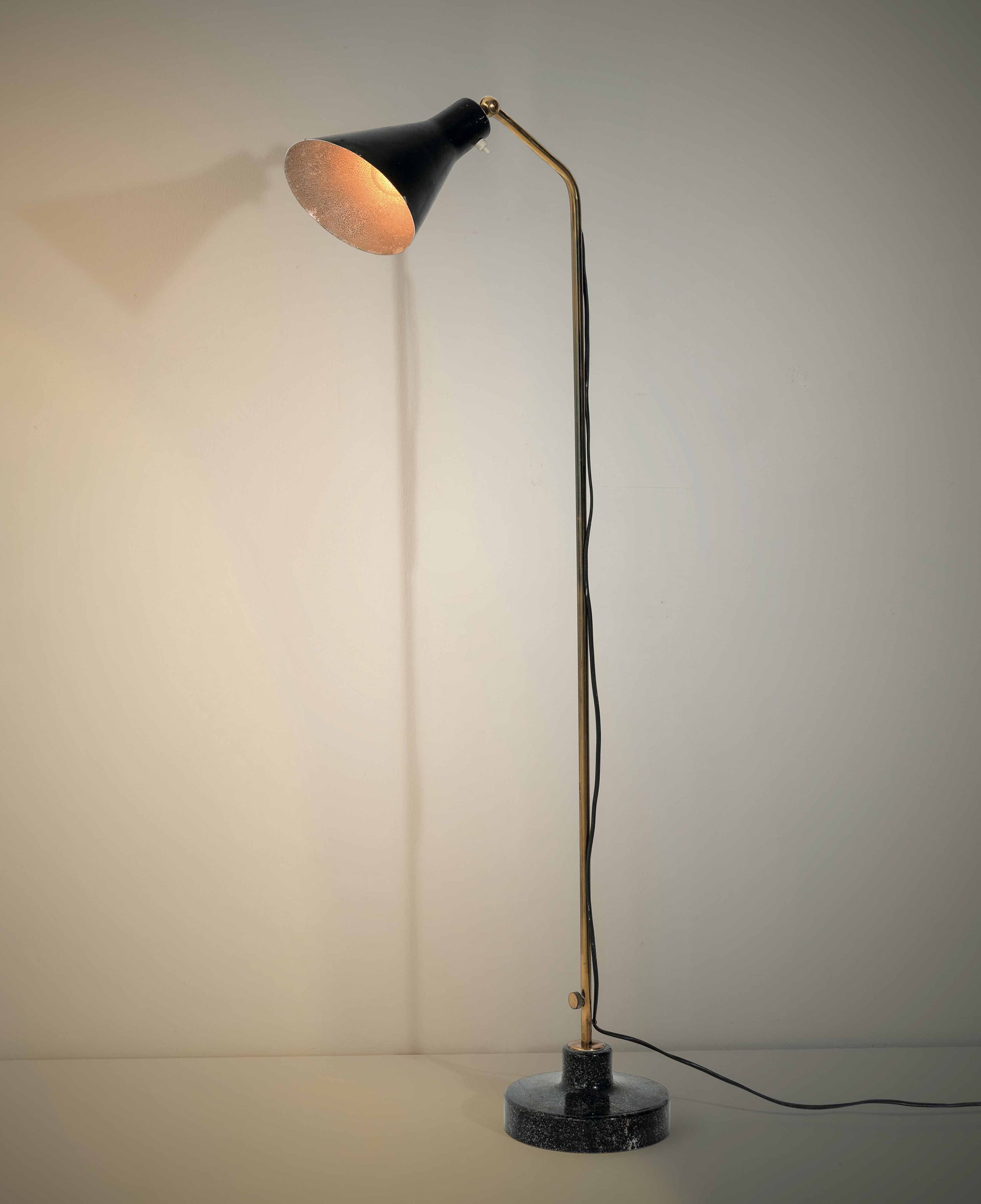
Lampada Alzabile - Lt3, 1948

Gardella's activity was also decisive in the field of design as early as 1947, when, together with Luigi Caccia Dominioni and Corrado Corradi Dell'Acqua, he founded Azucena, the first Italian company producing modern furnishing objects. Gardella designed various furniture pieces.

== Architecture according to Gardella ==
If one looks for Ignazio Gardella's style, one is likely to be disoriented. His projects, over the years, changed according to changing architectural tendencies, often anticipating them, but always containing elements that diverged from the current with which they might be associated. Gardella is one of the Italian Rationalists, but his use of local construction techniques, like the famous brick screen of the Dispensario in Alessandria, makes him in some ways a heretic.

In the 1950s he came closer to regionalist currents, but his buildings also maintained an abstraction that distanced them from the most famous works of Neoliberty or Neorealism.

In the 1960s and 1970s he seemed to adhere to a strictly professional form of practice like the Modern Movement or the International Style. His Uffici Alfa Romeo (1969) opposed the use of industrial materials and the development of a complex program. But Gardella strictly controlled the form, imposing a symmetrical composition.

In the 1980s he seemed to stick to the Post Modern, but he did not in reality share its principles. Thus he himself said, "It is always difficult to say who are the fathers and who the sons. But Mario Ridolfi and I said, jokingly, that if we were really the fathers of all the works exhibited (at the 1980 Venice Biennale) we would have to admit (...) to having gone to bed with women of every type and every race." (S. Guidarini, 2002).

In reality there are aspects of his work that remain the same throughout his long career and constitute a continuity. These aspects can be synthesized in two complementary points:

- Gardella's architecture always maintains a composure that could be called 'classic'. This can be deduced from the extreme refinement of his details, which are comparable to those of his contemporary and friend Franco Albini, whether by control of the complete design of a building or because of the design of architectural spaces. In his architecture there is a preoccupation with and emphasis on the immediate, on the style of the moment, and a research for a kind of timelessness.

- Complementing this aspect is his capacity to change registers, to adapt himself to the genius loci (the spirit of a place), as few other architects have succeeded to do. If the almost contemporary Case Borsalino in Alessandria are compared with the Casa alle Zattere in Venice, one realizes that there is a great difference. The materials have changed, as have the decorative elements and the conception of volume. This is clearly owed to his will to take up influences from the built environment or context.

== Works and important projects ==
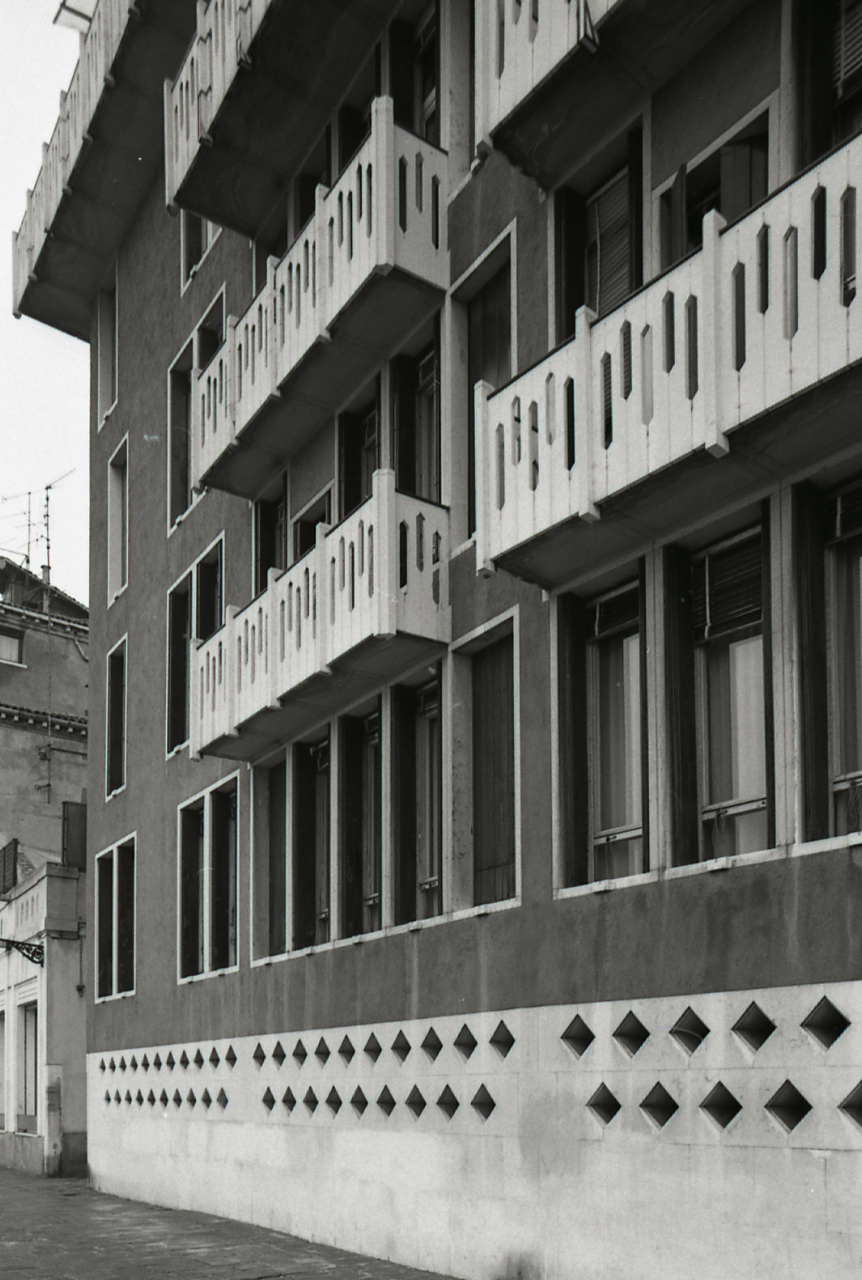
Casa Cicogna alle Zattere, Venice (1953). Photo by Paolo Monti, 1982

From among his first buildings one could note the Antitubercular Dispensary of Alessandria (1934–38) which is one of the masterpieces of rationalist architecture.

The "Casa alle Zattere" in Venice (1953)

=== Before World War II ===
Before the war he also participated in several important architecture competitions such as:

- 1933-1936 Extension of the Villa Borletti in Milan.
- 1934 Concorso per una Torre Littoria in piazza del Duomo, Milan (unrealized project)
- 1933-1938 Dispensario Antitubercolare di Alessandria.
- 1938 The Milano-Verde (Green Milan) Plan (with Franco Albini, Giuseppe Pagano, Giulio Minoletti, Giancarlo Palanti, Giacomo Prevadal, Giovanni Romano);

=== After the War ===
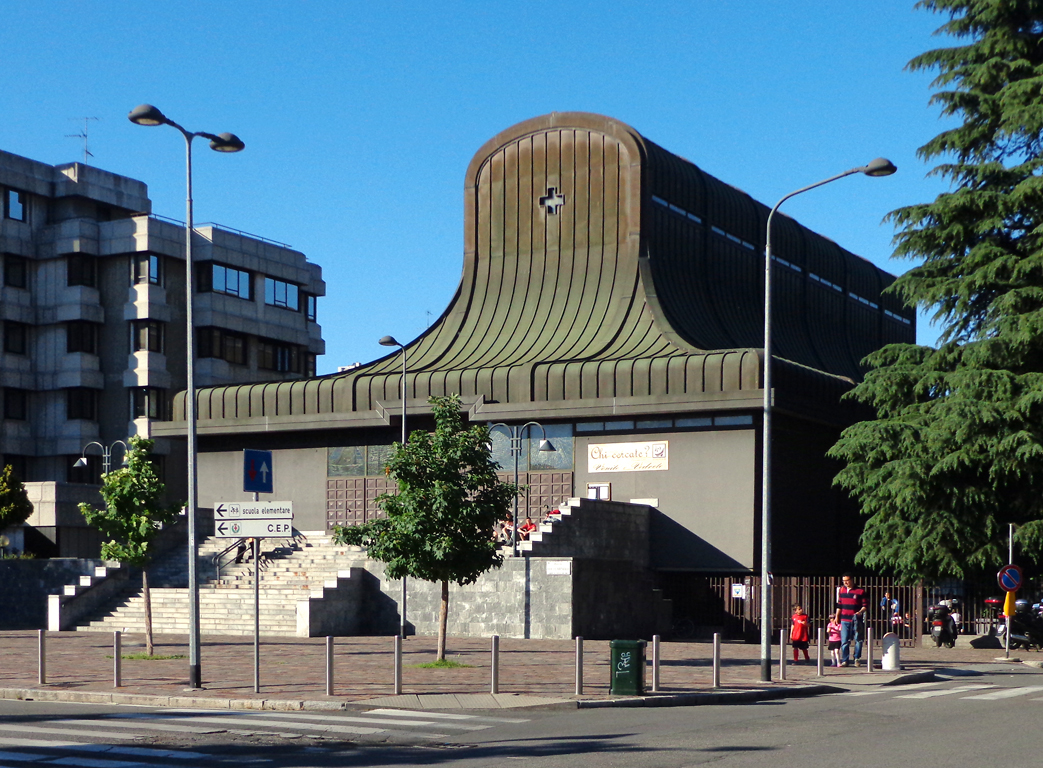
San Nicolao della Flue, Milan

In the early postwar period, Gardella took up once more his activity with full vigor, producing many important works and some masterpieces such as:

- 1944-1946 Barbieri House, or Casa del viticultore, Castana
- 1947-1953 Apartment House Tognella, or "Casa al Parco", Milan (with Enrico Ghiringhelli)
- 1947-1954 Padiglione d'Arte Contemporanea (PAC), Milan (which he rebuilt with his son Jacopo Gardella in 1996 after the attack of 1993)
- 1948-1952 Apartment House for the Borsalino Employees, Alessandria
- 1949-1954 Apartment House "Giardini d'Ercole" in via Marchiondi, Milan (with Anna Castelli Ferrieri)
- 1951-1956 Public Housing "INA-Casa", Cesate, Milan
- 1953-1958 Casa Cicogna, or "Casa alle Zattere", Venice
- 1958 Olivetti Company Canteen and Recreation Center in Ivrea
- 1963-1994 La Spezia Courthouse, La Spezia
- 1967 Kartell headquarters in Noviglio, with Anna Castelli Ferrieri
- 1968-70 Chiesa di San Nicolao della Flue, with Anna Castelli Ferrieri
- 1969 Uffici Alfa Romeo in Arese, with Anna Castelli Ferrieri.
- 1969 Project for the New Civic Theater of Vicenza (unrealized)
- 1969-1976 Piano particolareggiato for the area of San Donato and San Silvestro in Genoa (with Silvano Larini, Jacopo Gardella, Daniele Vitale, Giuliano Nardi)
- 1975-1989 Faculty of Architecture of Genoa
- 1981-90 Teatro Carlo Felice in Genoa (with Aldo Rossi, Bruno Reichlin and Angelo Sibilla)

== Writings ==
The publications of Gardella, though they include many articles and projects published in all of the major international reviews, are not just of theoretical interest. A list of his publications is available at:

- Interview with Ignazio Gardella by Antonio Monestiroli, in L'architettura secondo Gardella, Bari-Roma, Laterza, 1997.

== University professor ==
Gardella also had an important role in education, from his invitation in 1949 by Giuseppe Samonà to be part of the staff of the IUAV. His academic career brought him to the post of Professore Ordinario in 1962, which he held until 1975.

== Awards ==
Gardella won many prizes, among which are the: Premio Nazionale of Olivetti for Architecture (1955), the 1977 Medaglia d'oro del Presidente della Repubblica ai benemeriti della Scuola, della Cultura e dell'Arte (Gold Medal), the Leone d'Oro alla carriera dalla Biennale di Venezia (1996), Honorary membership in the Royal Institute of British Architects (RIBA), and member of the Accademia di San Luca and socio onorario of the Accademia di Belle Arti di Brera.

== Publications ==
- Ceriani, AA. VV. a cura di Franco Buzzi; Ignazio Gardella progetti e architetture 1933-1990, Venezia, Marsilio, 1992.
- Guidarini, Stefano; Ignazio Gardella nell'architettura italiana. Opere 1929-1999, Milan, Skira, 2002.
- Loi, AA. VV. a cura di Maria Cristina; Ignazio Gardella. Architetture, Electa, Milan 1998.
- Porta, AA. VV. a cura di Marco; L'architettura di Ignazio Gardella, presentazione di Giulio Carlo Argan; saggio introduttivo di Roberto Gabetti; testimonianze di Franco Purini, ... (e altri), Milan, Etas libri, 1985.
- Samonà, Alberto; Ignazio Gardella e il professionismo italiano, Romae Officina, 1981c.
- Zermani, Paolo; Ignazio Gardella, Rome-Bari, Laterza, 1991,
- Palandri, Alessio; BBPR, Franco Albini e Franca Helg, Ignazio Gardella. Tre architetture in Toscana, Edizioni Diabasis, Parma, 2016. ISBN 978-88-8103-852-7
