= San Donato Milanese =

San Donato Milanese San Donaa (Lombard)
- Comune
- Città di San Donato Milanese
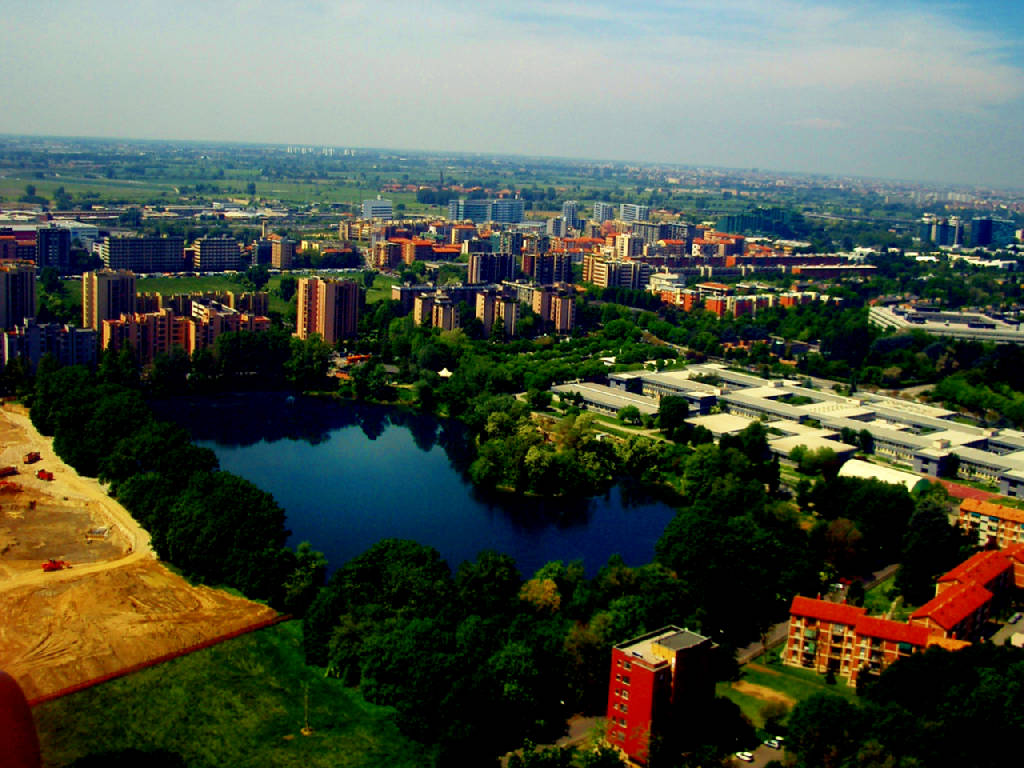

- Coat of arms

- Location within Italy Location within Lombardy
- Coordinates: 45°25′N 9°16′E
- Country: Italy
- Region: Lombardy
- Metropolitan city: Milan (MI)
- Frazioni: Poasco, Sorigherio

Government
  - Mayor: Francesco Squeri

Area
  - Total: 12.8 km^{2} (4.9 sq mi)
- Elevation: 102 m (335 ft)

Population (31 May 2023)
  - Total: 32,051
  - Density: 2,500/km^{2} (6,490/sq mi)
- Demonym: Sandonatesi
- Time zone: UTC+1 (CET)
  - Summer (DST): UTC+2 (CEST)
- Postal code: 20097
- Dialing code: 02
- Patron saint: Donatus of Arezzo
- Website: Official website

San Donato Milanese (Milanese: San Donaa [ˌsãː duˈnaː]) is a comune (municipality) in the Metropolitan City of Milan in the Italian region of Lombardy, located about 10 kilometres (6 mi) southeast of Milan. It is served by the San Donato underground station right on the borderline between the town and Milan and by the San Donato Milanese railway station, serving only trains for the Trenord S1 line "Saronno–Lodi" and vice versa.

== History ==
Although the area was settled in ancient times, the origins of San Donato date back to the 7th century, when a pieve was founded here by the army of Grimoald I, Duke of Benevento. After a period under the Milanese family De Advocati, the town was a possession of the archbishops of Milan until the 16th century.

A series of abbeys were founded in the area by Bernard of Clairvaux during the 11th century. Later Frederick Barbarossa resided here after his destruction of Milan, while the Visconti and the Torriani fought here (1278) for the possession of the duchy of Milan. The battle of Marignano was also fought nearby, Francis I of France settled his headquarters here after the battle.

Today San Donato is a modern industrial and services centre. It received the honorary title of city with a presidential decree on 30 December 1976.

On 3 October 2021, a private plane crashed into an empty building under renovation on San Donato Milanese after taking off from Milan to go to Olbia. The plane had 8 passengers, all of whom died. One of the deceased was Dan Petrescu, a Romanian businessman and billionaire, one of the richest people in Romania at the time and the owner of the plane.

== See also ==
- Metanopoli
