= Marcello Nizzoli =

Italian artist, architect, and designer (1887–1969)

- Born: 2 January 1887; Boretto
- Died: 31 July 1969 (aged 82); Camogli
- Occupation: Designer, architect, painter, poster artist
- Works: Olivetti Lettera 22
- Awards: Honorary Royal Designer for Industry (1961); Compasso d'Oro (1954, 1957)

Marcello Nizzoli (Italian pronunciation: [marˈtʃɛllo nitˈtsɔli]; 2 January 1887 – 31 July 1969) was an Italian artist, architect, industrial and graphic designer. He was the chief designer for Olivetti for many years and was responsible notably for the iconic Lettera 22 portable typewriters in 1950.

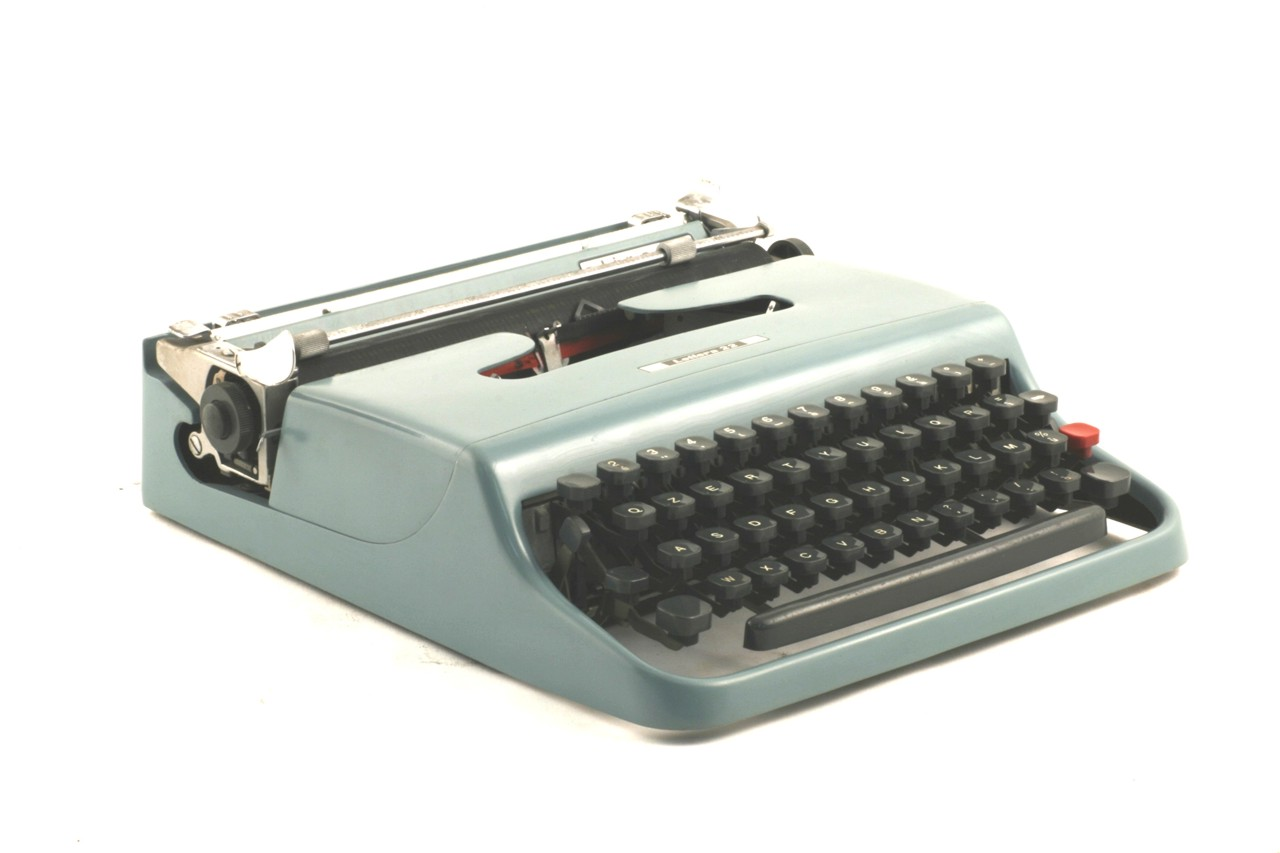
The Olivetti Lettera 22 typewriter designed by Nizzoli and Giuseppe Beccio won the inaugural Compasso d'Oro award in 1954.

== Working life ==
After graduating from the Accademia di Belle Arti of Parma (1913), he worked as a draughtsman in Milan until World War I. The influence of Futurism and, particularly, the work of Fortunato Depero were fundamentally important in his cultural formation. His success as a draughtsman was established at the Prima Esposizione Internazionale delle Arti Decorative in Monza (1923), but he continued to diversify, designing fashion accessories such as handbags, shawls and poster advertisements for famous names such as Campari and Martini. During the 15 years after World War I, Nizzoli demonstrated his remarkable talent for handling the most diverse forms of the avant-garde movements, from Futurism to Cubism, from the Viennese Secession style to Novecento Italiano, adapting them to the taste of his cultivated middle-class clientele. Nizzoli had already designed (with Fausto Melotti) mannequins for Baldessari's early Rationalist Craja Café (1930) in Milan when he met Edoardo Persico (1931) who, with Giuseppe Pagano, had begun to transform the magazine Casabella into the main forum for architectural debate. Persico's theoretical approach complemented Nizzoli's more practical orientation, and some of the most significant artefacts of Italian Rationalism emerged from their collaboration.

The Sala delle Medaglie d’Oro, in which the achievements of Italy's gold-medallist aviators were fêted at the Mostra Dell’aeronautica Italiana in Milan (1934), was an important symbolic use of the Rationalist three-dimensional grid visually to enhance as well as define function. The use of linear elements was further extended for decorative as well as spatial purposes in the Parker shop (1934–5), Milan. With Giancarlo Palanti they designed the Salone d’Onore at the Triennale of 1936 in Milan, a brilliant reconciliation of the contemporary call for a national neo-classical style with European modernism. The meeting with Persico was influential in to drawing Nizzoli, his meeting in 1938 with Adriano Olivetti was equally significant as far as industrial design was concerned.

The first of a long series of calculating machines, the MC 4S Summa, was created in the Olivetti planning and research office, surroundings highly favourable to collaboration between artists and technicians. It set the pattern for future projects. In-depth consideration was given to technical and ergonomic aspects of the product and to easy user-identification of its parts, resulting in a unified concept, based on careful analysis rather than on an a priori formula.

== Inventions and awards ==
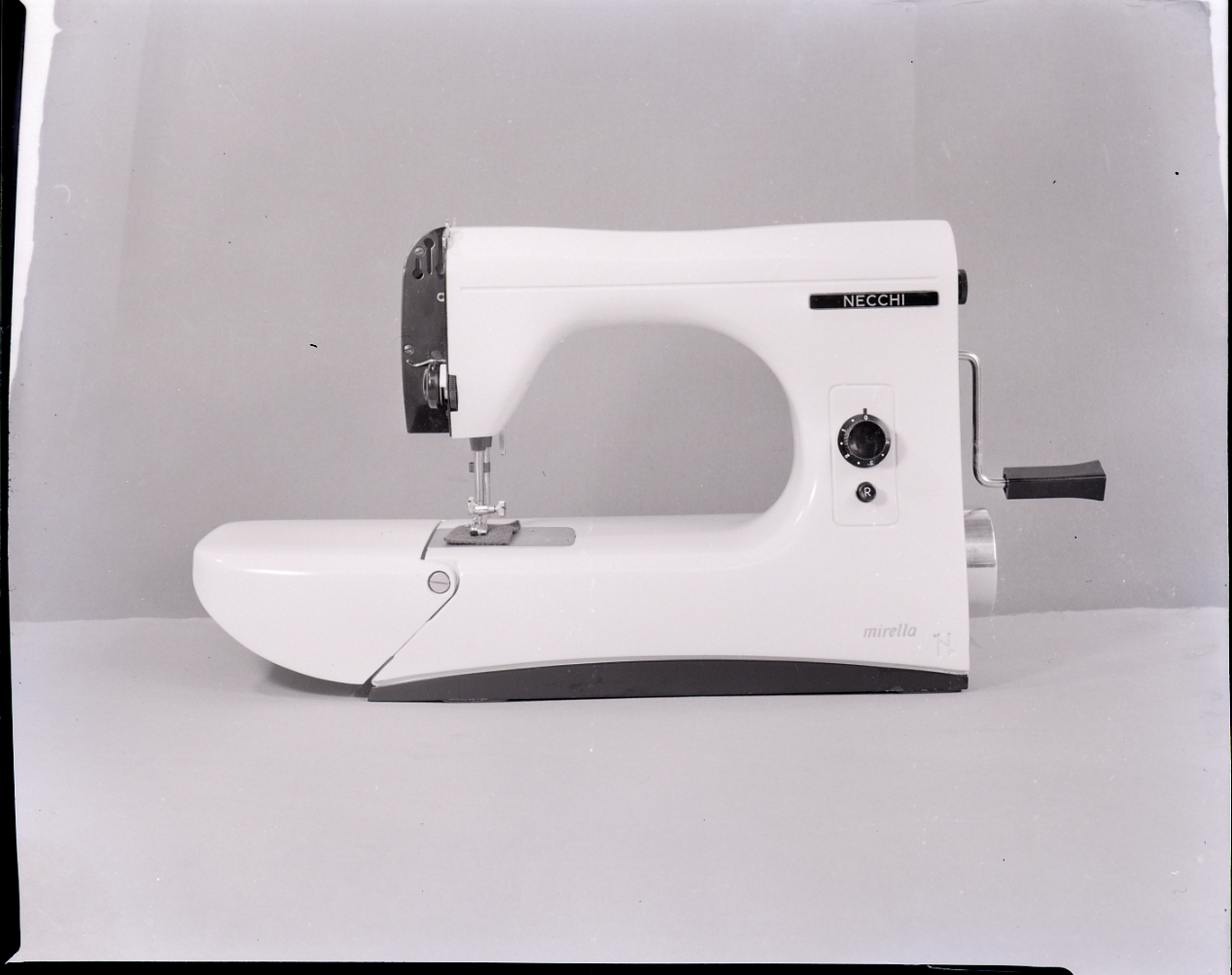
Nizzoli's design for the Mirella sewing machine for V. Necchi Spa won the Compasso d'Oro award in 1957. (Photo by Paolo Monti, 1960)

Nizzoli's two best-known design projects are the Olivetti typewriter Lexicon 80 (1948) and the Necchi Mirella sewing machine (1957). He also designed the iconic Aurora 88 fountain pen (1948). He continued his architectural work, along the lines laid down by Persico in the early 1930s, working towards the integration of the arts with architecture, as in the Eni office block (1956–8; with Giuseppe Mario Oliveri) at Metanopoli, in San Donato Milanese, Milan.

He was awarded the inaugural Compasso d'Oro in 1954 for his design of the Olivetti Lettera 22 portable typewriter, and he received a second Compasso d'Oro in 1957 for the Mirella sewing machine.

== Gallery ==
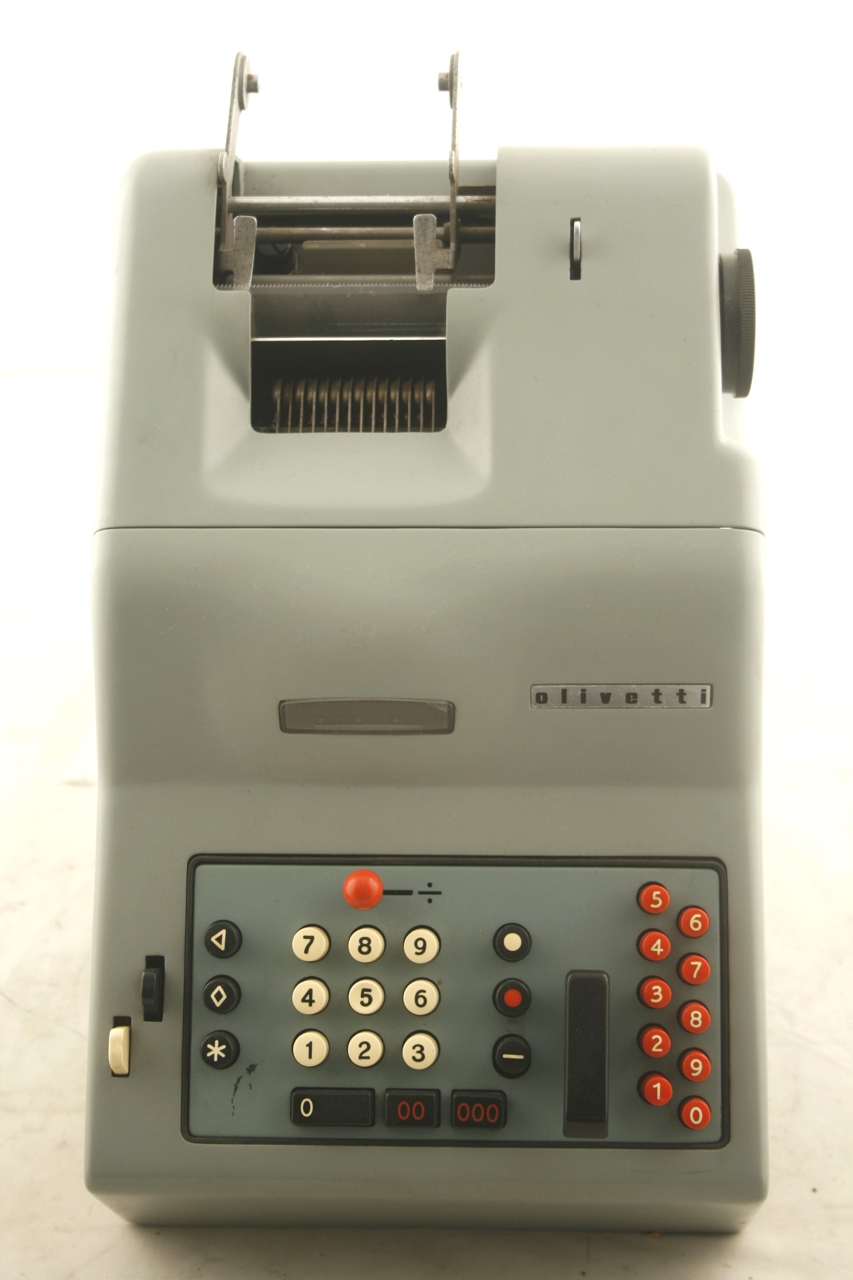
Olivetti Divisumma 14 calculator (1948)

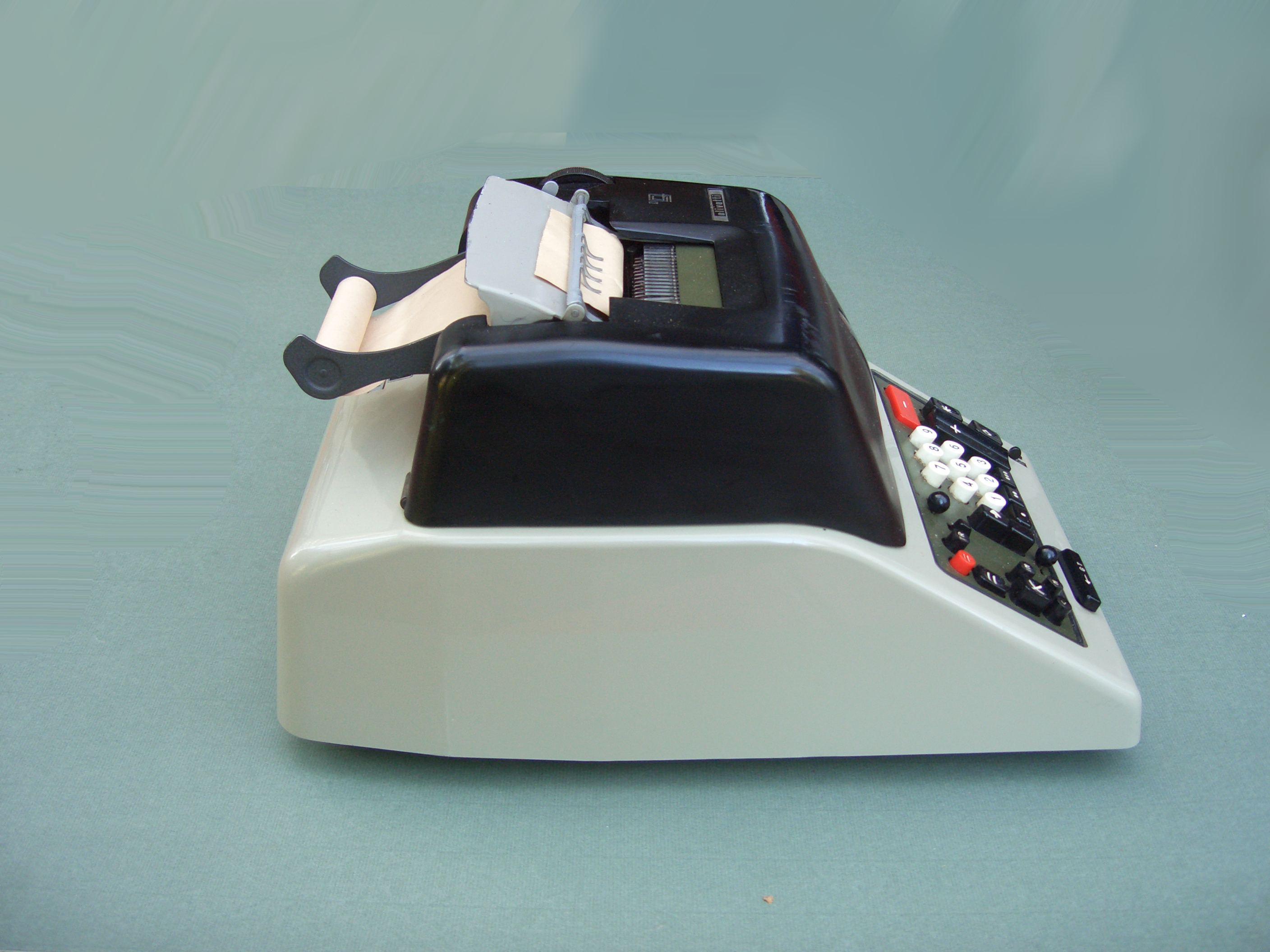
Olivetti MC 24 calculator (1956)

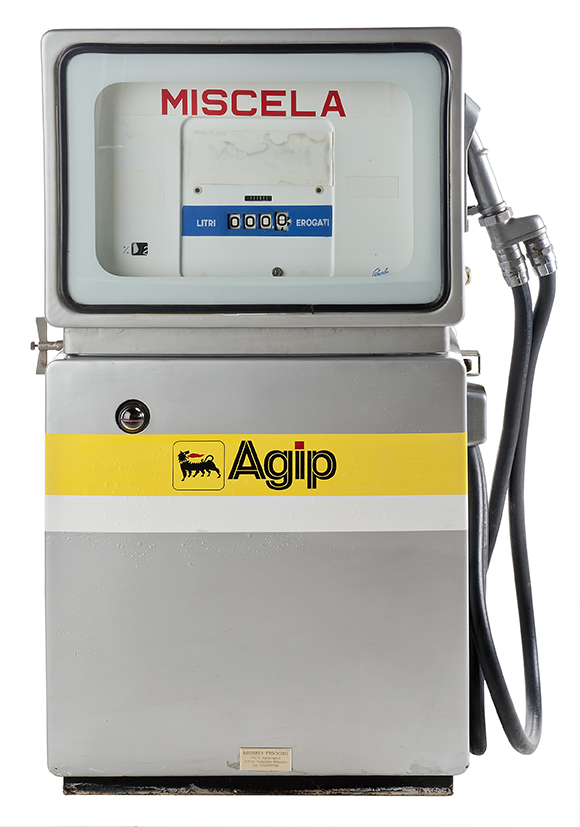
AGIP gas pump, designed with Giuseppe Mario Oliveri (1963)
