= Fascist martyrs =

Italians who died for the Fascist cause

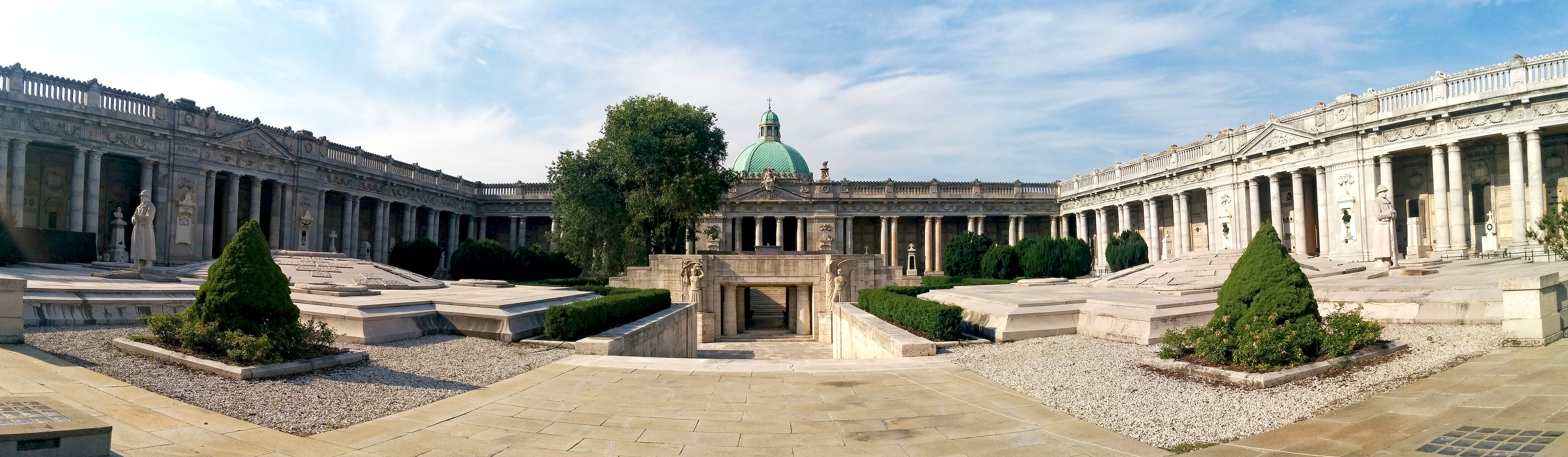
The Monument to Martyrs of Fascism in the Certosa di Bologna unveiled on the occasion of the tenth anniversary of the March on Rome on 28 October 1932.

Fascist martyrs or Martyrs of the Fascist Revolution or Martyrs of Fascism (Italian: martiri fascisti) were citizens of Fascist Italy who died for the Fascist cause and were memorialized for doing so as martyrs, beginning with the founding of the Fasci Italiani di Combattimento in 1919.

== History ==
During the birth and spread of the fascist movement, its theoreticians argued that a civil war was underway, for which the responsibility would derive from the anti-national drift of the proletariat during Biennio Rosso. The breakdown of legality, by the successful holding of the March on Rome, would have confirmed the revolutionary nature of the advent of fascism, qualifying as martyrdom the deaths of its adherents during the previous period of turmoil: in fact, during the two-year legalitarian period (1922–1924), precisely because he was President of the Council of Ministers of the Kingdom of Italy according to the statutory order, Benito Mussolini endorsed the rhetoric of "martyrs" to keep alive the pseudo-revolutionary narrative of his coming to power.

Therefore, on 30 November 1922, only a month after Benito Mussolini seized power after the March on Rome, it was decreed that each city or town should establish an avenue or park of Remembrance, with a new tree for each fallen in the town during the Great War: shortly afterwards the number was extended to all "fascist martyrs," and by 1925 they amounted to about 400 names. Nevertheless, the "myth of three thousand dead Fascists that Fascism began to spread in the fall of 1924" was intended to counterbalance the traumatic effect of the Matteotti murder on public opinion, according to the motto "one Matteotti is not worth 3000 dead".

== Counting ==
In 1925, in the regime's declarations, there were 45 dead and 285 wounded for the fascist cause, while in 1933 it was reported that the Voluntary Militia for National Security had over four hundred dead in addition to thousands of maimed and wounded for the fascist cause since its founding in 1923. Family members of the fallen, maimed and wounded were ex officio members of the Fascist Association of Families of the Fallen, Maimed and Wounded for the Revolution.

During the Regime, it was said that the Fascist Revolution had cost three thousand deaths, but it was a number emphasized by the same propaganda. The Opera Nazionale Balilla remembered these three thousand deaths in the first article of the Balilla Catechism in the Balilla Oath:

In the name of God and Italy I swear to carry out the orders of the DUCE and to serve with all my strength and, if necessary, with my blood, the Cause of the Fascist Revolution. The Fascist who swears no longer belongs to himself but to the DUCE and the cause of the Fascist Revolution, just as the three thousand Fascist martyrs died for the DUCE and the Revolution.

== Apologetics ==
During a speech at Palazzo Venezia on the occasion of the tenth anniversary of the March on Rome on 17 October 1932, Mussolini before 25,000 hierarchs remembered the Fascist Martyrs with these words, "Of all the insurrections of modern times, the bloodiest was ours. A few dozen required the storming of the Bastille...the Russian one cost but a few dozen victims. Ours, which lasted three years, required vast sacrifice of young blood."

On 24 May 1933, on the occasion of the ceremony of the entry into the war in World War I, the governor of Rome Francesco Boncompagni Ludovisi together with the vice-governor laid laurel wreaths at the Tomb of the Unknown Soldier and at the Altar of the Fascist Fallen on the Capitol; then the president of the Senate of the Kingdom Luigi Federzoni laid a laurel wreath on the Altar of the Fascist Fallen on behalf of Parliament.

In 1932 on the occasion of the Exhibition of the Fascist Revolution, the Fascist Martyrs' Memorial was inaugurated, but the catalogue merely stated that there had been "hundreds and hundreds".

On 5 December 1932, to close the decennial events, the President of the Senate of the Kingdom Luigi Federzoni along with all senators paid their respects at the Fascist Martyrs' Chapel at the Palazzo del Littorio, then the headquarters of the National Fascist Party.

== Shrines and monuments ==
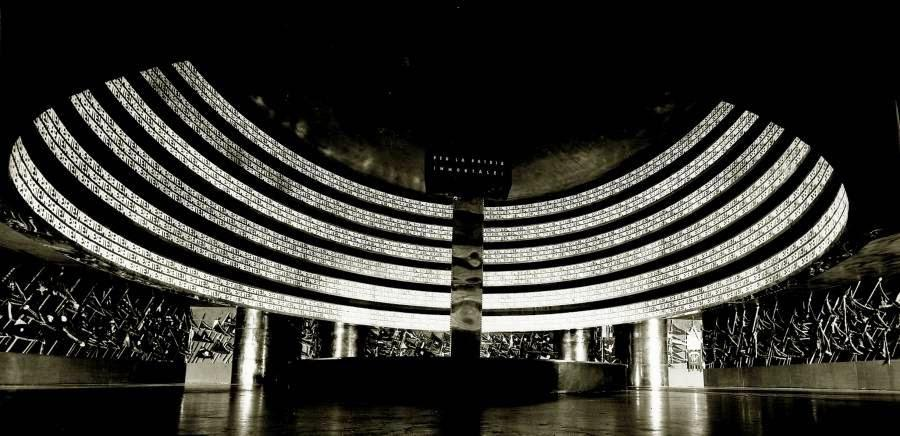
Shrine of the Martyrs of the Fascist Revolution at the Exhibition of the Fascist Revolution, 1932

- In Bologna on 28 October 1932, the Monument to the Martyrs of Fascism at the Certosa di Bologna was inaugurated with 53 bodies of those who died for the cause of the Fascist Revolution designed by architect Giulio Arata with statues by sculptor Ercole Drei.
- In Florence in 1934 in the Famedio di Santa Croce the Sacrarium of Fascist Martyrs was built, which was enlarged in 1938 to accommodate the fallen "for the Empire and for Spain" and in 1939 was visited by Adolf Hitler and Benito Mussolini.
- In Milan's Monumental Cemetery in 1925, the Shrine of Fascist Martyrs was built, which is still a gathering place for nostalgics today.
- In Novara in 1934 the Novara Fascist Memorial was inaugurated in Rimembranze Park.
- In Novi Ligure (Alessandria) the Fountain to the Fascist Martyrs was designed by architect G. Serra.
- In Pavia, the Fascist War Memorial was built inside the monastery of Santa Maria delle Cacce.
- In Rome, a Chapel of the Fallen for the Revolution was built at the Verano Cemetery strongly desired by the leadership of the National Fascist Party with twelve bodies of Romans who fell for the Fascist cause between 1920 and 1922, but since there were only four bodies it was added those who died in 1924 or years later or even abroad; the chapel was inaugurated in 1933, a Chapel of the Fascist Martyrs was also built at the Palazzo del Littorio (headquarters of the PNF) with marble from the Julian Alps and was inaugurated on 28 October 1932. In addition, the Altar of the Fascist Martyrs in the Piazza del Campidoglio was inaugurated on 28 October 1926.
- In Siena in 1938 the Shrine of Fascist Martyrs was inaugurated with ten bodies inside the Basilica of San Domenico, the ceremony was also attended by Achille Starace sent by the Duce.
- In Turin on 28 October 1934, the Fascist Fallen Bell was consecrated in Piazza Castello, which was placed in the Torre Littoria.

== Other ==
- In Gaeta (Latina) there was Piazza dei Martiri Fascisti, since 1945 Piazzale Giovanni Caboto.
- In the Genoese neighbourhood of Sampierdarena on 19 August 1935, Via Milite Ignoto changed its name to Via dei Martiri Fascisti, a name it kept until 3 July 1945, when it changed its name to Via Paolo Reti in honour of the fallen partisan.
- In the Pinciano district of Rome were Viale dei Martiri Fascisti and Piazzale dei Martiri Fascisti renamed Viale Bruno Buozzi and Piazza Don Minzoni in 1945.

== See also ==
- Propaganda in Fascist Italy
- Funerals of Ion Moța and Vasile Marin
- Monument to Onésimo Redondo
- Horst Wessel
- Beer Hall Putsch
