= Torre littoria =

Italian Fascist building type

In the Fascist architecture of Italy, a torre littoria (plural torri littorie) 'lictor tower' or torre del littorio is a monumental tower, a building type, sponsored by the Italian Fascist Party between 1933 and 1940. They "fused monumentality, rationalism and classicism in the service of the imperial vision of the state" and "commemorate[d] the Fascist revolution". Many are attached to a Casa del Fascio, but some are free-standing, such as the Torre Littoria of Turin. Many use the vocabulary of Italian rationalist style. They often include clocks or bells. The tower base sometimes included a Sacrario ai Caduti Fascisti 'shrine to Fascist martyrs', which was usually removed after the fall of the Fascist regime. Most of them were renamed after WWII.

In 1932, Achille Starace, the national secretary of the Fascist Party (PNF) decreed that every Casa del Fascio should have a torre littoria with bells to announce Fascist ceremonial events.

The building type was first created in Arezzo in 1933 from a restored medieval tower. It included a large bell and a memorial to Fascist martyrs.

By the mid-1930s, they were ubiquitous:

- Turin: Torre Littoria, a freestanding office building
- Milan: Torre Branca, originally the Torre Littoria, a free-standing steel lattice tower in the Parco Sempione
- Varese: Civic Tower, freestanding
- Como: incorporated into the main block of its Casa del Fascio and not projecting beyond it
- Lissone, incorporated into its Casa del Fascio
- Predappio, part of its Casa del Fascio
- Salerno, part of its Casa Littoria; at the base of the tower was a large hall with a shrine to the dead of the First World War
- Arezzo
- Biella
- Sestri Levante
- Soresina
- Casalmaggiore, functioned as a water tower
- Rhodes (Italian Dodecanese)
- Mogadishu (Italian Somaliland), part of its Casa del Fascio
- Addis Ababa (Italian East Africa), planned but never built

The city plans of Fascist new towns (Foundation Cities) generally included torri littorie in their central piazza as part of their Case del Fascio, e.g., in Aprilia (demolished), Carbonia, Fertilia, Guidonia Montecelio, Sabaudia, and Torviscosa.
