= Casa del Fascio =

Italian Fascist Party buildings

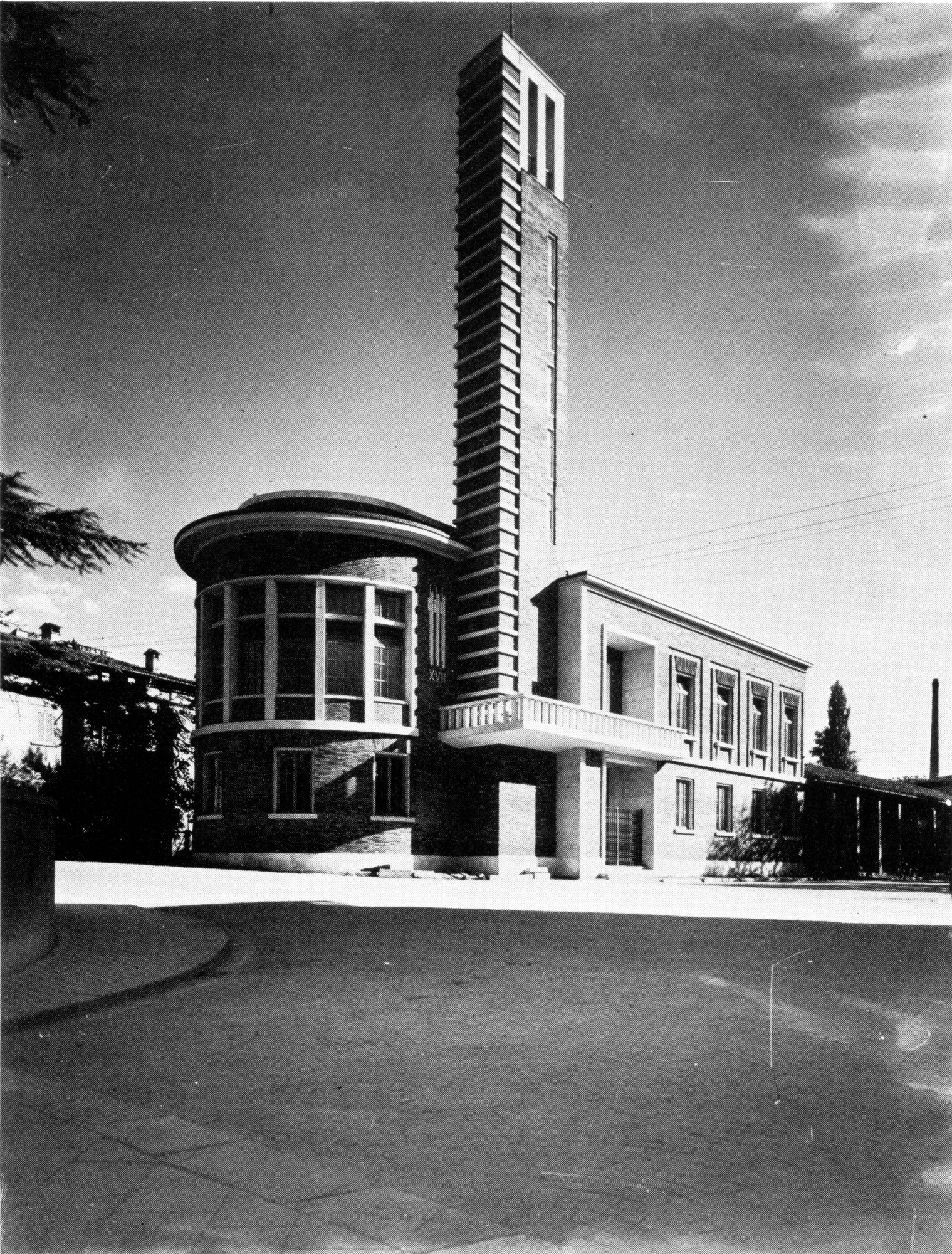
The Palazzo Littorio of Montevarchi

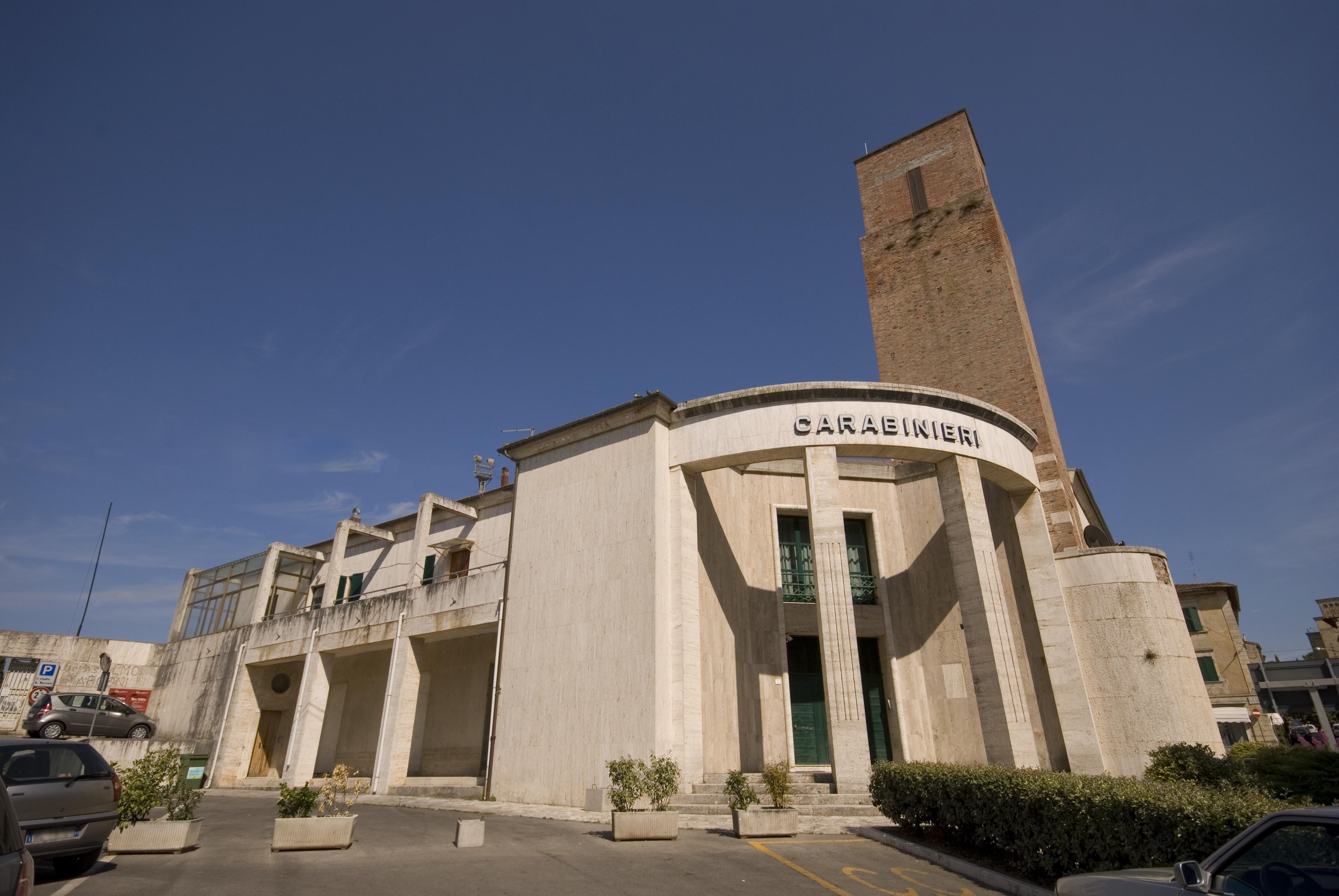
The former Casa del Fascio of Asciano

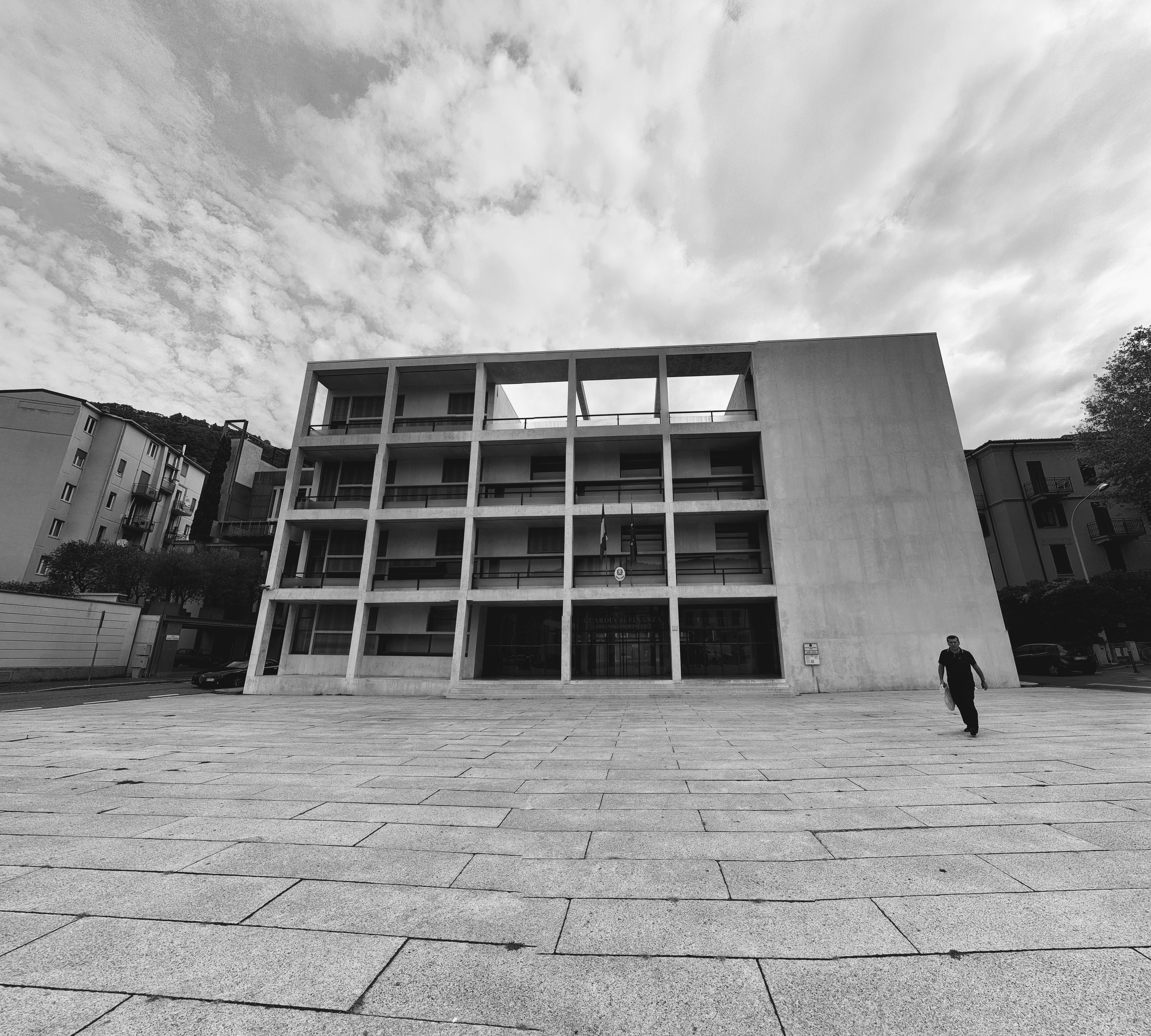
Main façade of the Casa del Fascio in Como seen from the Piazza del Popolo

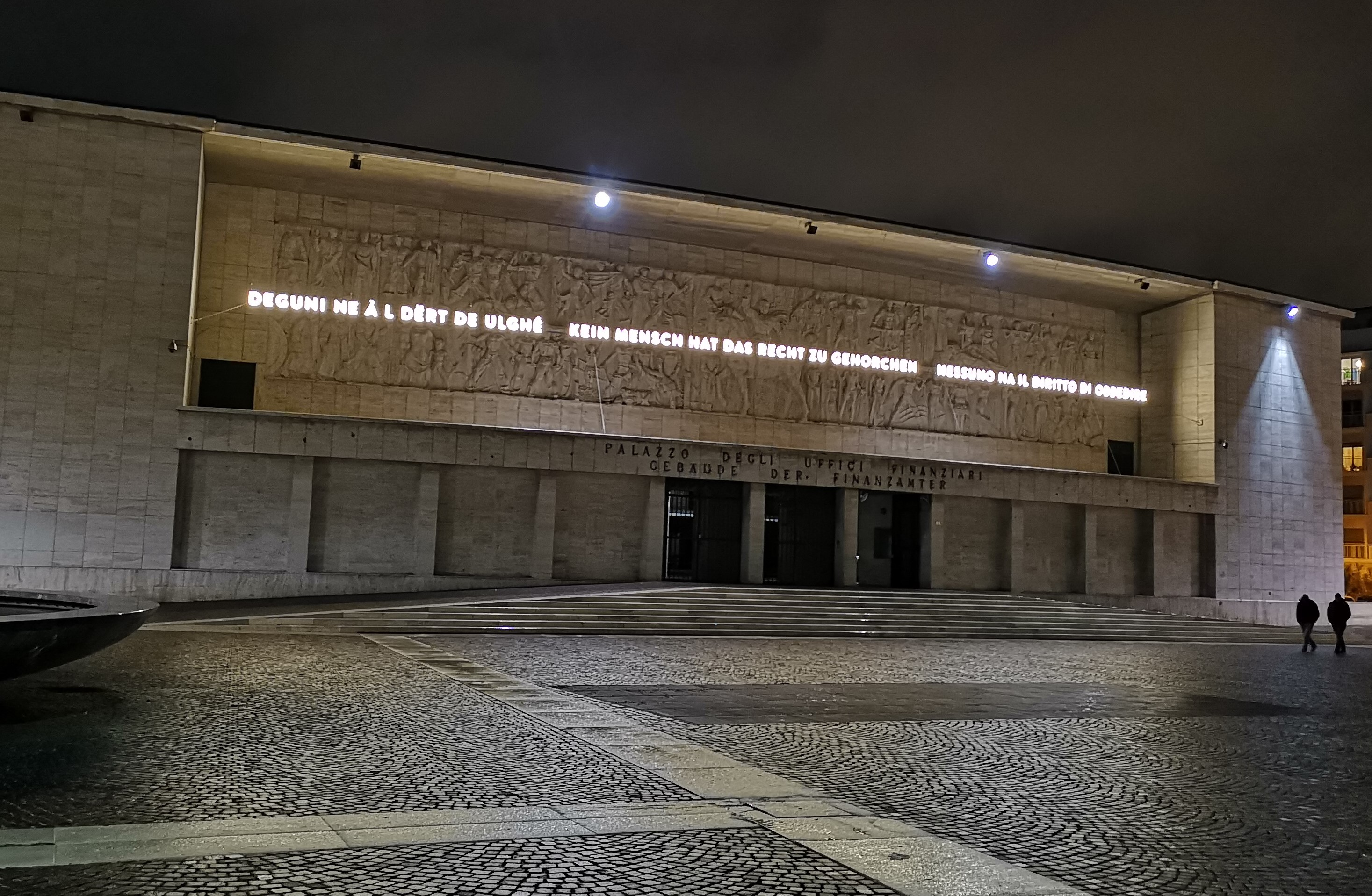
The former Casa Littoria in Bolzano, juxtaposed with a Hannah Arendt-quotation in 2017

A casa del Fascio, casa Littoria, or casa del Littorio (Italian pronunciation: [ˈkaːza del ˈfaʃʃo, ˈkaːsa -]) was a building housing the local branch of the National Fascist Party (PNF) and later the Republican Fascist Party (PFR) under the regime of Italian Fascism, in Italy and its colonies, and Malta. In major urban centers, it was called the palazzo del Littorio or palazzo Littorio. Littorio means lictor, the bearer of the fasces lictorii, the symbol of Roman power adopted by the Fascist party.

== History ==
There were about 11,000 case del Fascio, 5,000 of which were constructed specifically for that use. Many were designed in Italian rationalist style by architects such as Giuseppe Terragni, Adalberto Libera, Saverio Muratori, Ludovico Quaroni, and Giuseppe Samonà, but there were also historicist and modern designs.

A common feature of Case del Fascio was a torre littoria, as decreed by Achille Starace, the national secretary of the PFN, in 1932.

The Case del Fascio became one of the central points of the Fascist new towns founded under the regime, along with the church and the town hall.

In smaller towns, existing buildings were bought or rented, sometimes unmodified, sometimes specially adapted.

After World War II, the Case del Fascio were turned over to the Italian state under the provisions of Law 159 of July 27, 1944, "Sanctions against Fascism". Still today they often bear signs or emblems of the fascist regime. At present, only the Bolzano former Casa Littoria has been recontextualized, displaying from 2017 onwards a quote from Hannah Arendt publicly contradicting the monumental bas-relief with Mussolini at its center.

== Examples ==
- Casa del Fascio (Bolzano)
- Casa del Fascio (Como)
- Casa del Fascio (Mogadishu)
- Casa del Fascio (Grosseto)
- Casa del Fascio (Varese)

== Bibliography ==
- L'architettura delle Case del Fascio nella Regione Lazio, a cura di Flavio Mangone e Andrea Soffitta, Alinea, Firenze, 2006
