= Casa del Fascio (Como) =

1936 rationalist building in Como, Italy

Palazzo Terragni
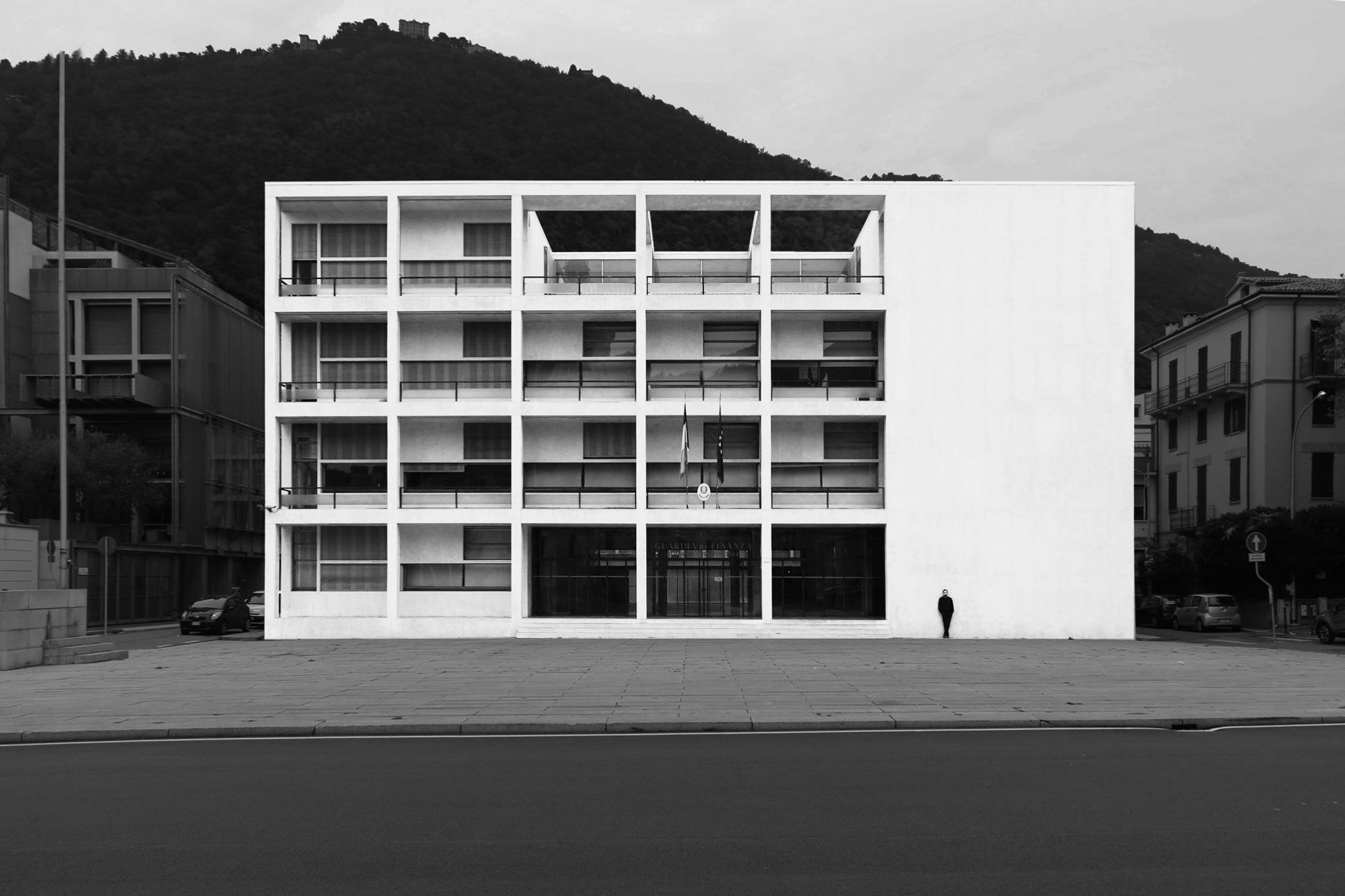
- Main façade overlooking Piazza del Popolo

- Location within Lombardy
- Former names: Casa del Fascio

General information
- Architectural style: Rationalist
- Location: Piazza del Popolo, 4, Como, Italy
- Coordinates: 45.812363°N 9.086022°E
- Construction started: 1932
- Completed: 1936

Technical details
- Size: 1,101 square metres (11,850 sq ft) floor area

Design and construction
- Architect: Giuseppe Terragni
- Designations: Head office of the provincial command of Guardia di Finanza

The Casa del Fascio of Como (Italian pronunciation: [ˈkaːza del ˈfaʃʃo, ˈkaːsa -]), also called Palazzo Terragni, is a building located in Como, Italy, in the Piazza del Popolo (former Piazza Impero), considered one of the masterpieces of Italian Modern Architecture. It was designed by the Italian architect Giuseppe Terragni (1904–1943) and was inaugurated in 1936 as the local casa del fascio, that is, an office of the National Fascist Party. After the fall of Fascism in 1945, it was used by the National Liberation Committee Parties and in 1957, it became the headquarters of the local Finance Police, who still occupy it. The building has a square plan and four stories.

Thanks to its high historical-artistic value, Casa del Fascio was named "cultural heritage of great historical and artistic interest" by the Superintendency of Archeology, Fine Arts and Landscape (SABAP) in 1986.

== History ==
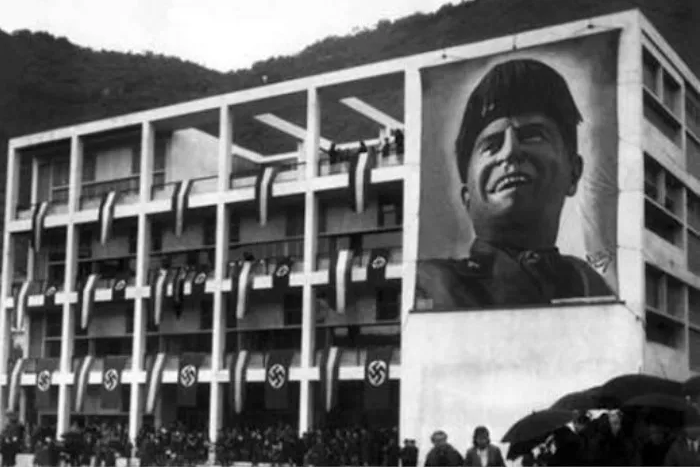
Casal del Fascio in the 1930s

In the original project of Casa del Fascio in Como from 1928, the building had a traditional layout. After many years of design revisions and construction delays, construction began in July 1933 and ended in 1936, when it was inaugurated as the local branch of the National Fascist Party.

In 1945, the building was forcibly occupied by the Provincial Federations of the National Liberation Committee Parties, after the liberation of Como from the Fascists. Soon after, the city of Como claimed ownership (even though law No 159 of 27 July 1944 stated that the property of the Fascist Party passes to the State) and then expressed its willingness to purchase it. After a series of unsuccessful negotiations, in 1956, it was put up for auction. The architect Bruno Zevi and many others protested, fearing that it would be demolished or wrecked, and this became a matter of national importance.

The Ministry for Cultural Heritage blocked the auction based on its important artistic character. In 1957, it was assigned to the Command of the VI Legion of the Finance Police, thanks to the intervention of the architect's brother, Senator Attilio Terragni. In 1959, a further ministerial decree was issued to protect the context of the Como Cathedral and the surrounding buildings, among them the Casa del Fascio. The decree was probably necessary; the artistic protection law only applied to buildings over 50 years old.

In 1963, the Italian Finance Police requested an authorisation to add three rooms on the terrace on the building's north side. Although authorization was granted, this was never implemented. In 1968, the project for the fourth floor was re-submitted, but was rejected, after protests from many academics.

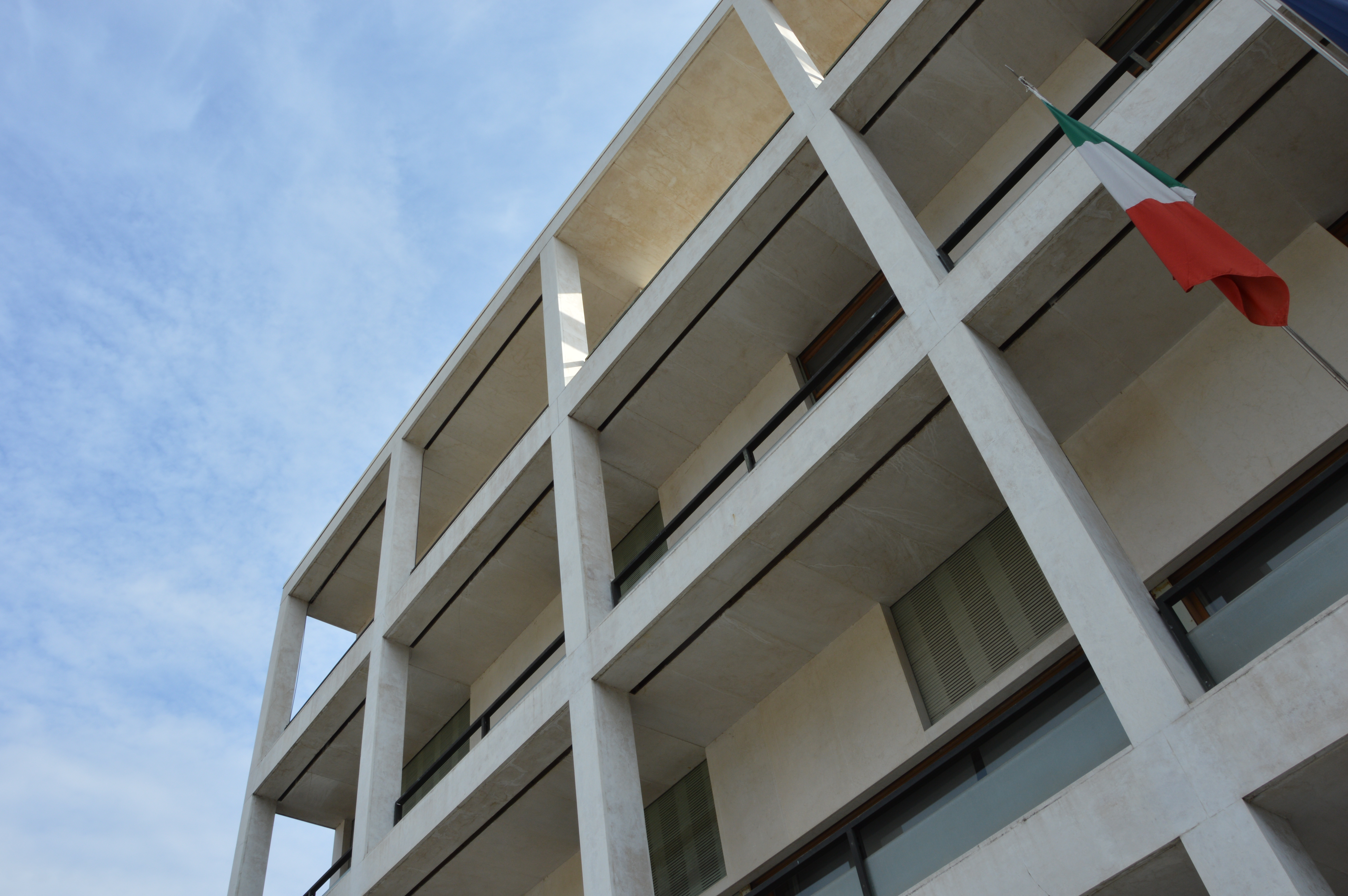
Detail of Casa del Fascio main façade

In 1986, on the 50th anniversary of its construction, the Ministry for Cultural Heritage officially recognized the Casa del Fascio as cultural heritage of great historical and artistic interest.

In the 1990s, urgent repairs were performed by Alberto Artioli of the Ministry, who also published a monograph on the building, Giuseppe Terragni, la Casa del Fascio di Como. Guida critica all’edificio: descrizione, vicende storiche, polemiche, recenti restauri 'A critical guide to the building: description, historical events, controversy, recent restorations'. The restoration work involved the external marble surfaces, some bathrooms, and a few concrete-framed glass block surfaces. This works brought up new issues around the restoration of Modernist buildings, which were often not recognized as works of artistic value.

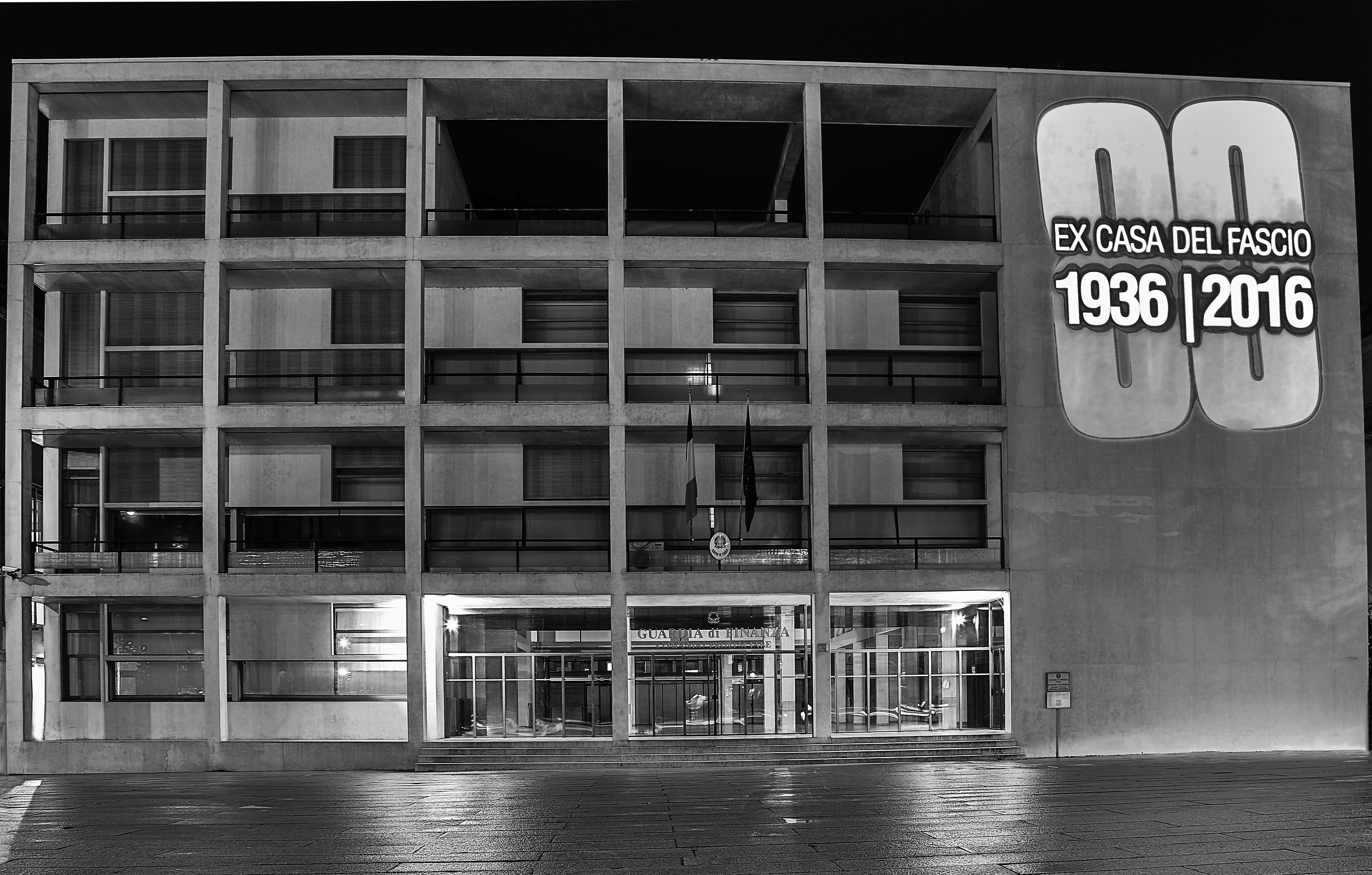
Projections on the main façade of the Casa del Fascio to celebrate the eighty years since its construction

In 1993, on the occasion of the fiftieth anniversary of Giuseppe Terragni's death, the SABAP organized a study day Materiali per comprendere Terragni e il suo tempo 'Materials for understanding Terragni and his times'. It was attended by Paolo Portoghesi, Alberto Sartorio, Lodovico Barbiano di Belgiojoso, Virgilio Vercelloni, and others.

In 2004, for the centenary of Terragni's birth, the SABAP of Milan together with the Centro Studi Terragni, the SABAP of Lombardy and the Municipality of Como presented a series of events to be held during the year, which included moments of study, research, debate, exhibitions on the figure of the great architect, to be implemented through the establishment of a special National Committee. The committee, called GT04, was chaired by Attilio Terragni, nephew of the architect, and boasted the presence of some of the most famous and representative architects in the world like Daniel Libeskind, Rafael Moneo and Peter Eisenman. The celebrations officially began on 18 April 2004, on the architect's birthday, and ended on 30 November. These events helped raise public awareness of the importance of Terragni's works in the history of architecture, not only in Italy but also worldwide.

In 2016 the eightieth anniversary of the construction of Casa del Fascio was celebrated and painter Fabrizio Musa from Como, in collaboration with the Maarc Association (Museo virtuale astrattismo architettura razionalista Como – Virtual museum Abstractism Rationalist Architecture Como), decided to pay homage to the architect's work by projecting the number Eighty on the main façade of Piazza del Popolo with the dates 1936–2016, to make the population participate in this remarkable achievement.

The Casa del Fascio currently houses the Command of the VI Legion of the Italian Finance Police, but in February 2017 a petition was launched proposing its re-use for cultural purposes, namely as a museum of rationalism and abstractionism.

== Description ==
During totalitarianism monumental architectures were often used as a propaganda of the Government ideologies: what their language has in common was the desire to privilege functional aspects of architecture, removing decoration and making sure that the form was subordinated to the function. Hence, the rigour and the functionalism promoted by the Fascist regime are translated into the constructive shapes of Casa del Fascio.

=== Interiors ===
The Casa del Fascio is a square, 33.20 m on a side, and 16.60 m tall, half its width, including four stories. The entrance of the building is raised from the Piazza del Popolo by four steps leading to the access landing.

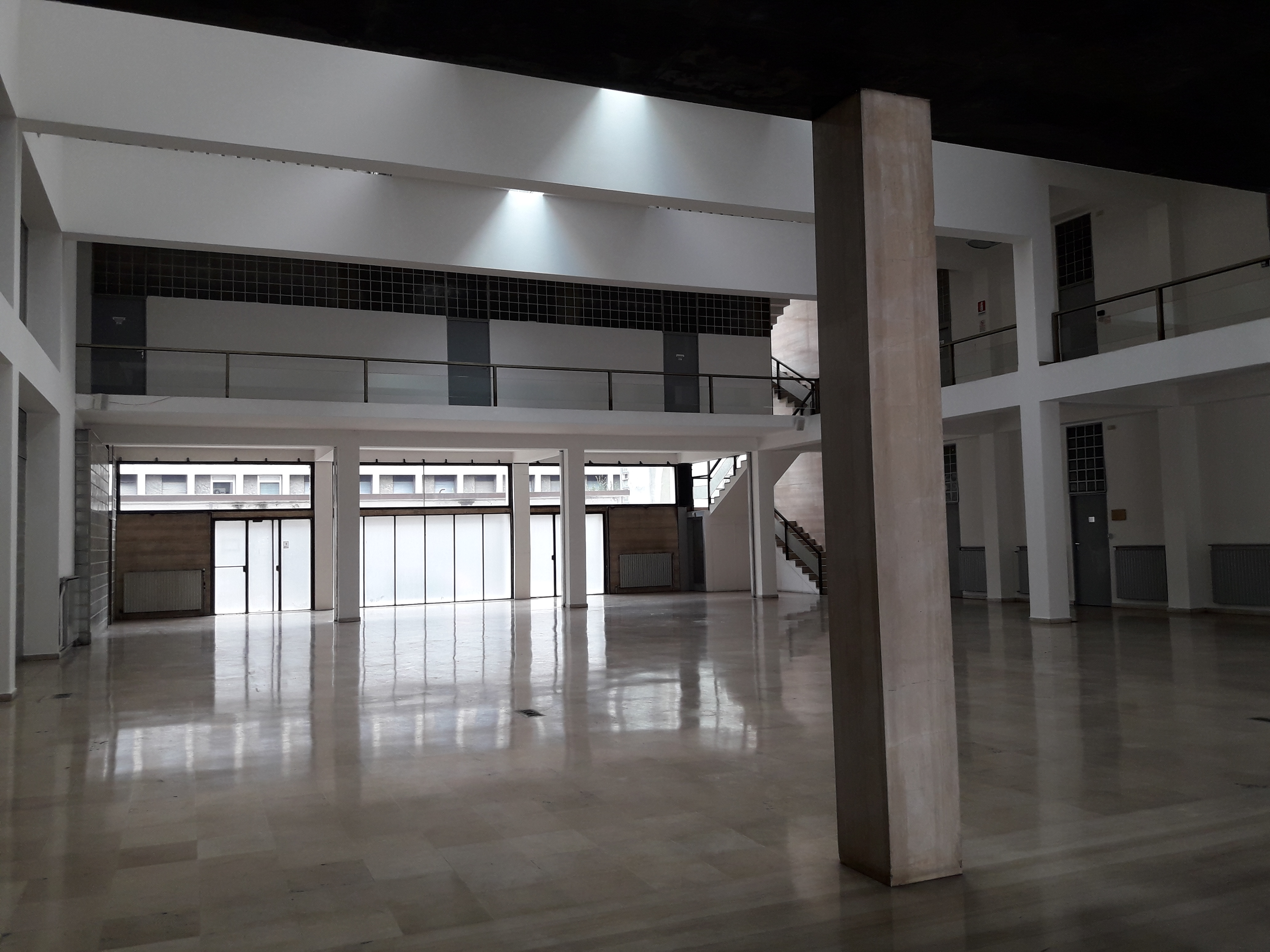
View from the Atrium towards the Salone delle Adunate

Through the glass doors on the ground floor lies the Atrium, characterized by a false ceiling covered with Nero di Belgio marble that, with its strong visual impact, prepares the visitor to see the Sacrario dei Martiri Fascisti, one of the most significant and emblematic spaces of the building. Because of its ideological and spiritual function, the Sacrario was deprived of its original function after the fall of Fascism and transformed into a place to celebrate the deads of the VI Legion of the Italian Finance Police. In the Atrium, but on the opposite side of the Sacrario, there is the main staircase, which is the cornerstone of the internal layout. The crux of the Casa del Fascio, however, is the so-called Salone delle Adunate 'Assembly Hall', a large central double-height room illuminated through a skylight made of concrete-frame glass block. Currently plastered in white, in the past it was painted with a delicate light blue-green colour, probably applied to the upper limit of the beams skylight. This huge space originally contained panels designed by the artist Mario Radice: a marble stele and a large image of the Duce on a glass support, dismantled after the post-war occupation of the building.

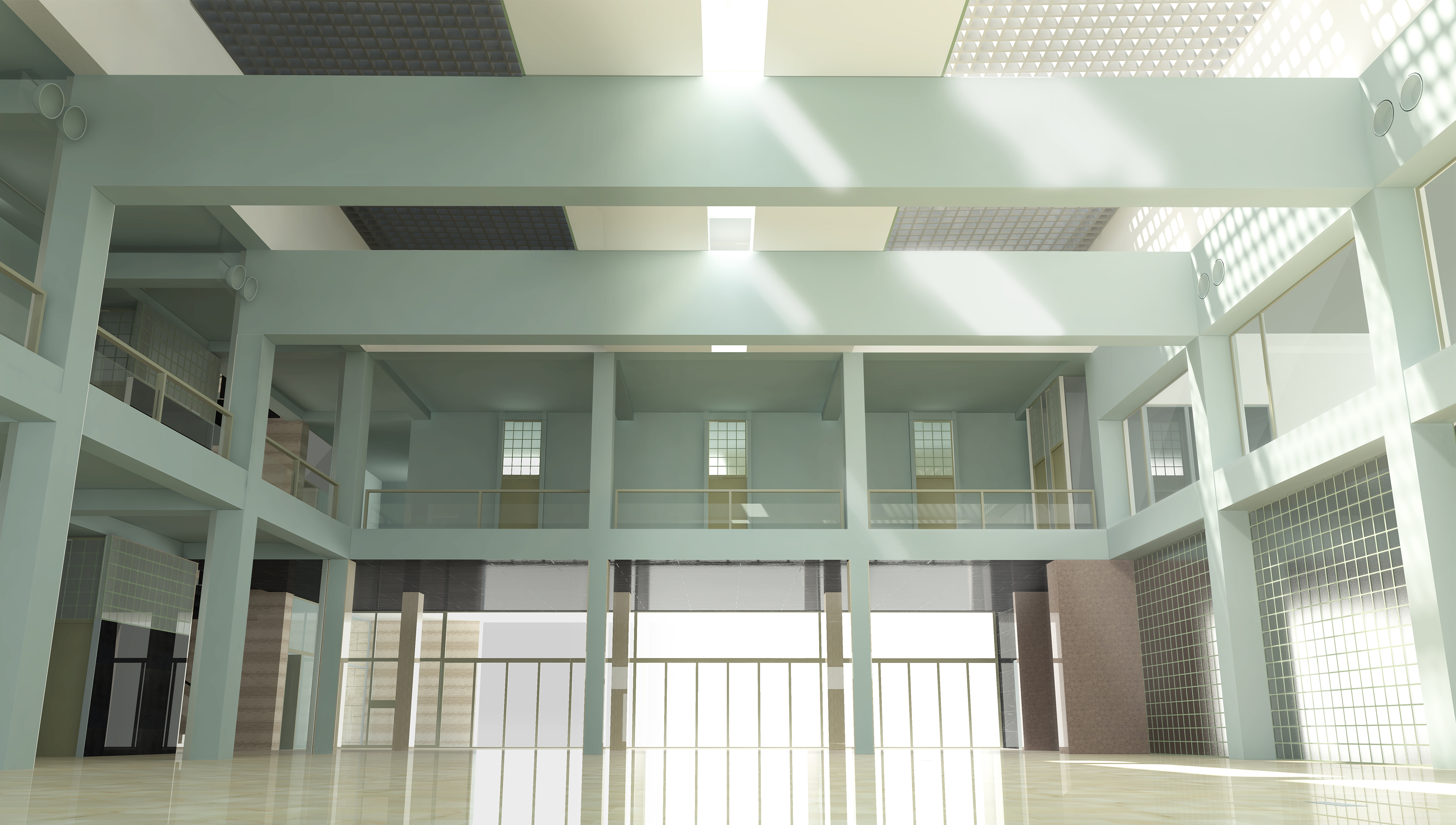
3D reconstruction of the original colour scheme of the Salone delle Adunate of the Terragni's Casa del Fascio in Como

The gallery on the first floor overlooks the Salone delle Adunate and connected the offices once intended for the Political Secretariat, the Sala del Direttorio and the Political Secretary's office.

The second floor follows the layout of the first floor: the only difference is that gallery overlooks the roof of the Salone delle Adunate on which the inner courtyard opens. This is characterized by the alternation of walls covered with glass-ceramic tiles (south-east and north-west sides) and walls made of concrete-frame glass blocks (south-west and north-east sides). The roof of the Salone delle Adunate, which is the floor of the inner courtyard, consists of three parts: two lateral parts in concrete-frame glass block and the central walkway. From the internal gallery on the second floor one can access the rooms that were originally used for offices and administration.

On the top floor two open galleries divide the part originally intended for university groups from the part formerly reserved for the archive and the caretaker's accommodation. It is possible to reach this last floor exclusively from the secondary staircase, while the other two are reachable also through the main staircase.

Inside the Casa del Fascio, in addition to the Nero di Belgio marble, there is also Pietra di Trani, Giallo Adriatico marble and Col di Lana marble.

=== Façades ===
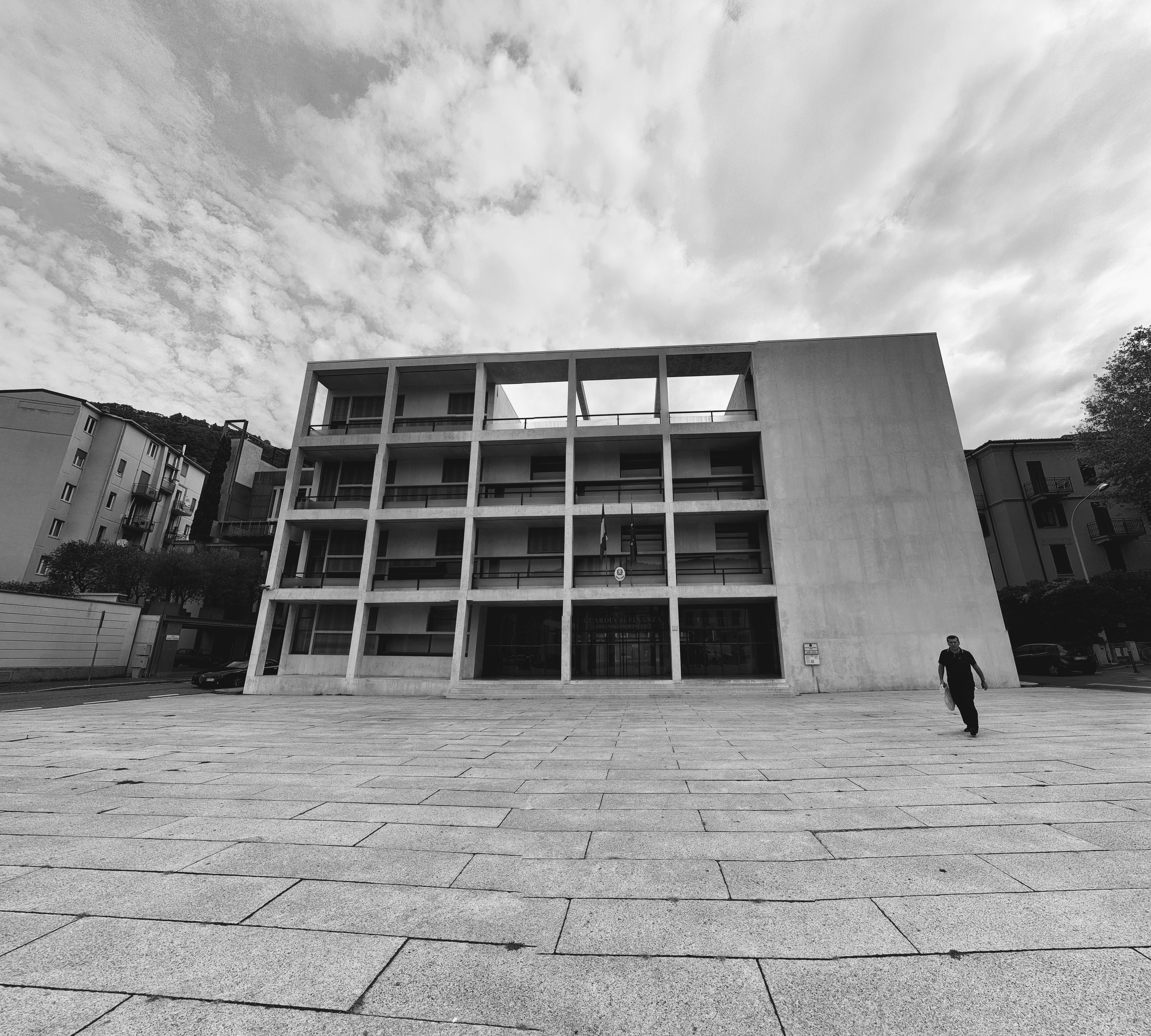
Main façade of the Casa del Fascio seen from the Piazza del Popolo

The main façade's composition is based on golden ratio and clear geometrical proportions. The geometric grid is made up of opaque parts, covered with Calcare di Bottincino slabs, and translucent parts of concrete-frame glass blocks. (Dal Falco, 2003, pp. 22–24) The four façades, equal in size, are different in architectural motifs and in the relationships between full and empty spaces, while maintaining their coherence for the materials used and for the structural rhythms.

The main façade on the Piazza del Popolo is characterized by a large loggia divided into five spans. Here, Terragni inserted curtains to protect from summer sun. The transparency of the loggia is balanced by the opaque lateral part that functions as a torre littoria (Lictor Tower), incorporated into the parallelepiped volume of the building. It is in this portion that the documentary and illustrative scenes by painter Marcello Nizzoli were originally intended to be placed.

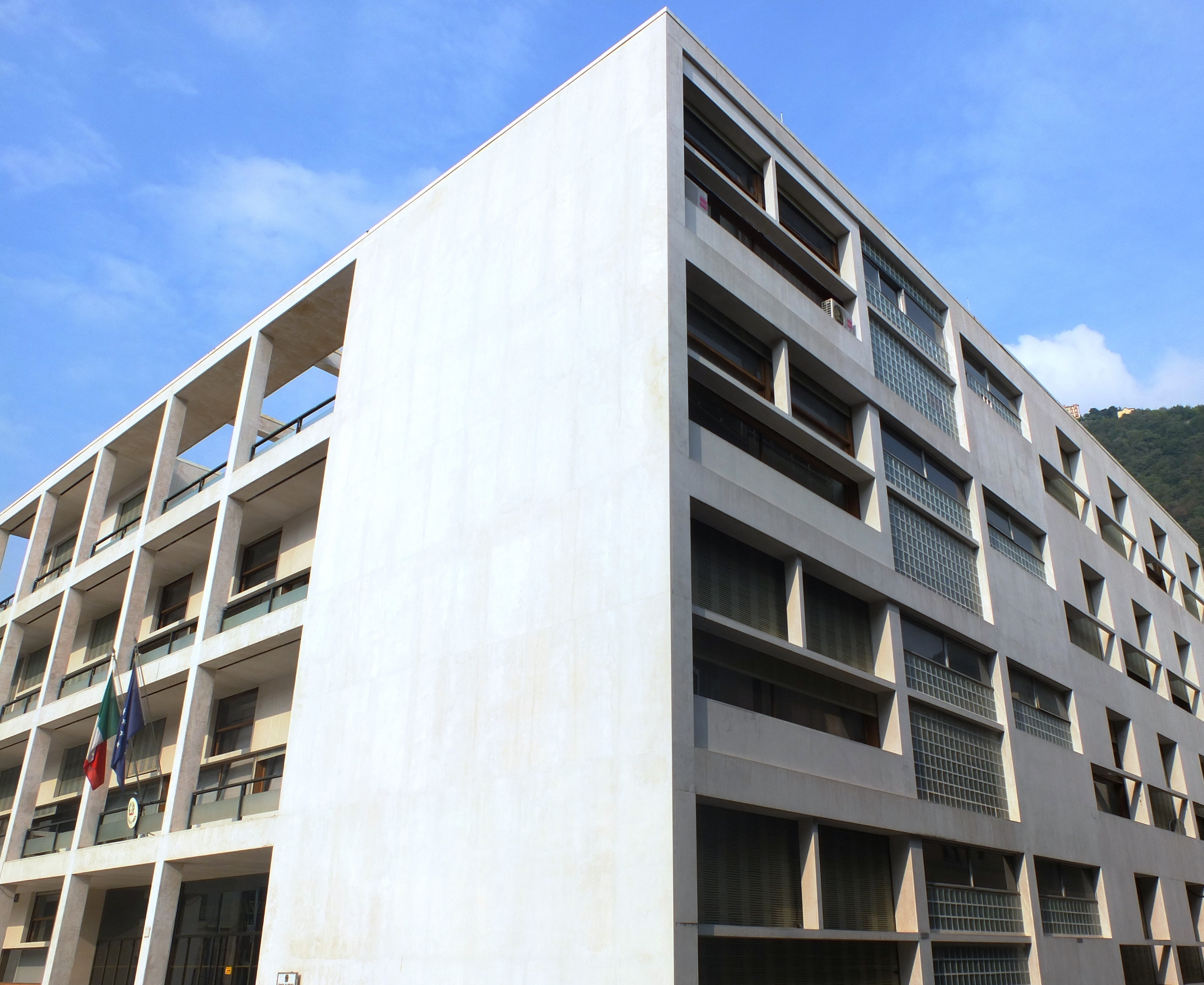
Corner between the façade of Piazza del Popolo and via dei Partigiani

The via dei Partigiani façade is defined by long wooden and iron windows and a concrete-frame glass block wall that occupies the span of the main internal staircase. Depending on the function of the rooms, the windows are divided into: ribbon windows for the bathrooms and "L" windows for the offices.

In the via Pessina façade, the structural parts emerge in the three central spans thanks to the presence of the wooden windows and the respective concrete-frame glass block railings. On the top floor, instead, the wall recedes slightly creating a small loggia.

The rear façade, finally, presents, in the central portion, an emptying of the structure given by the glass wall on the ground floor and the large attic loggia on the top floor. In the central part there are "L" windows, while in the service staircase portion there is a vertical glazed window.

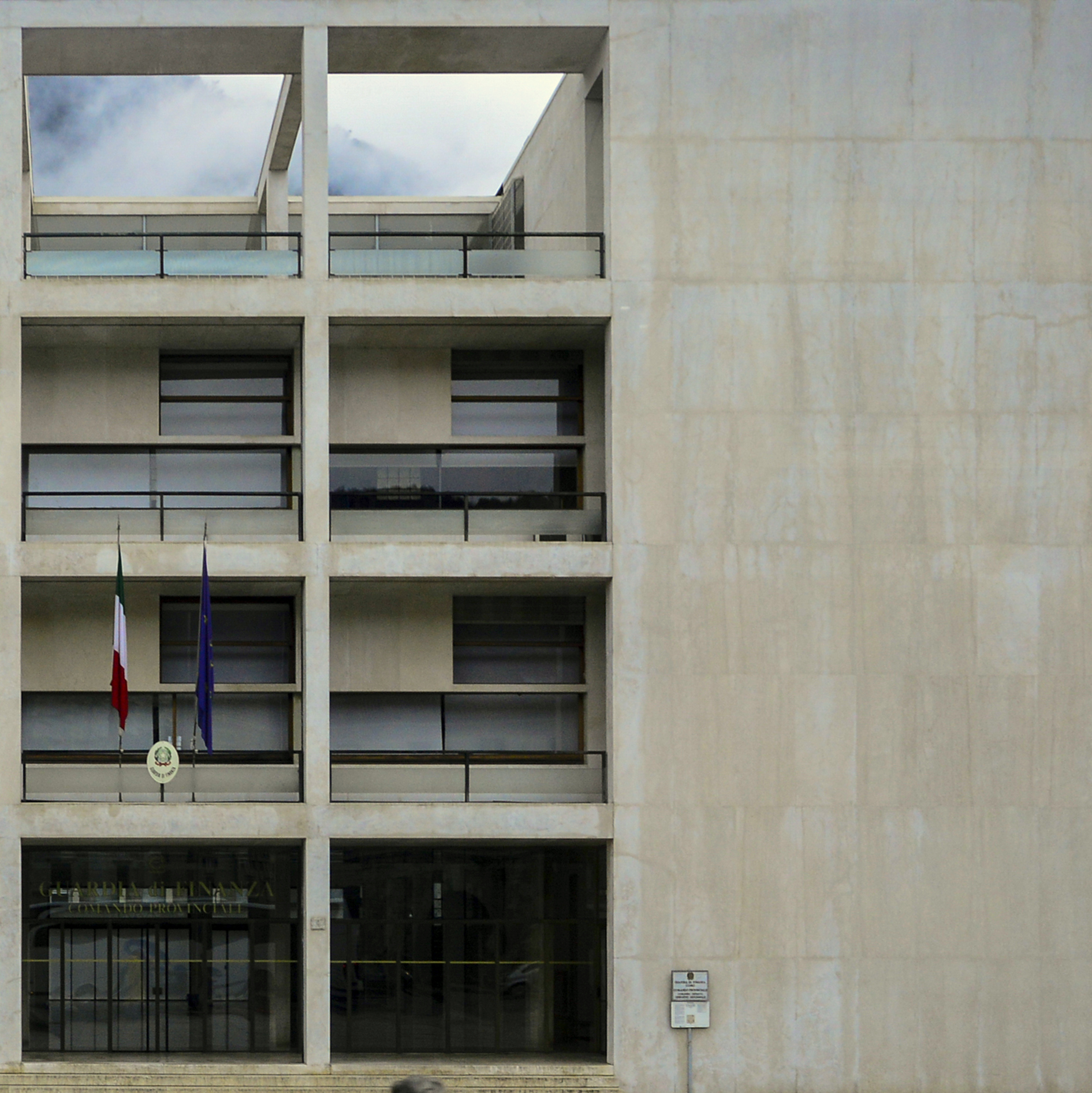
Main façade showing primary entrance

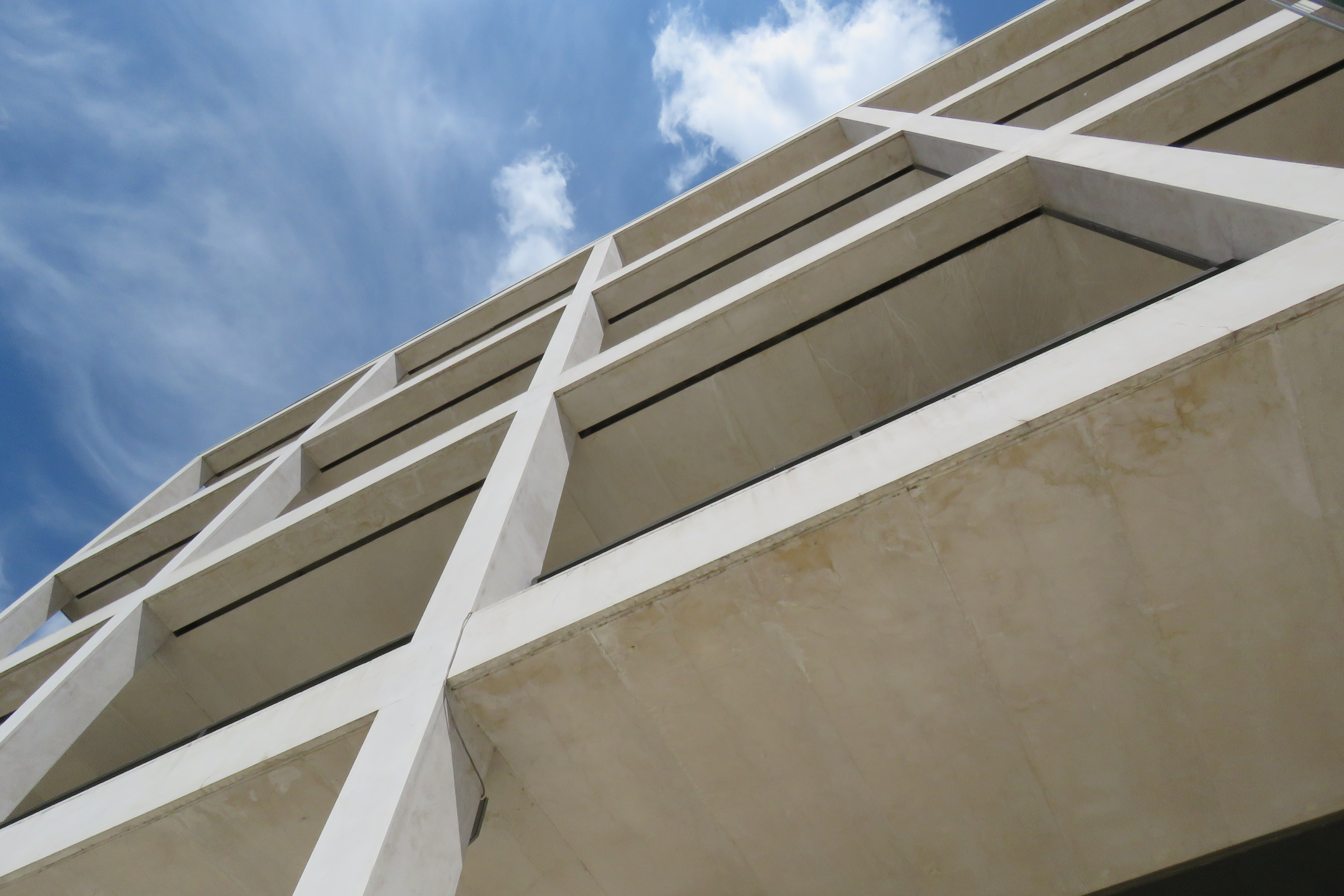
Detail of the façade

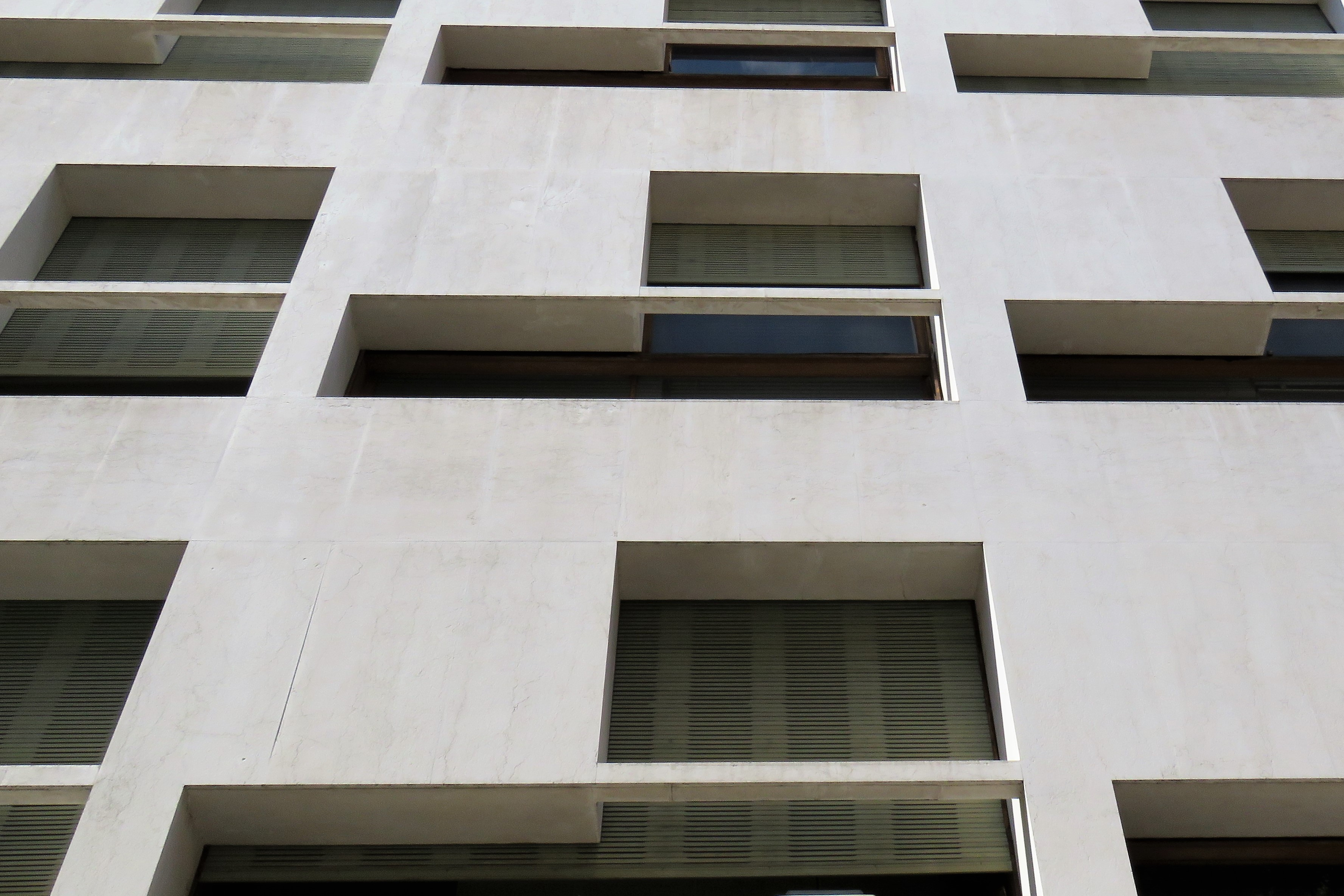
Detail of the lateral façade on via dei Partigiani

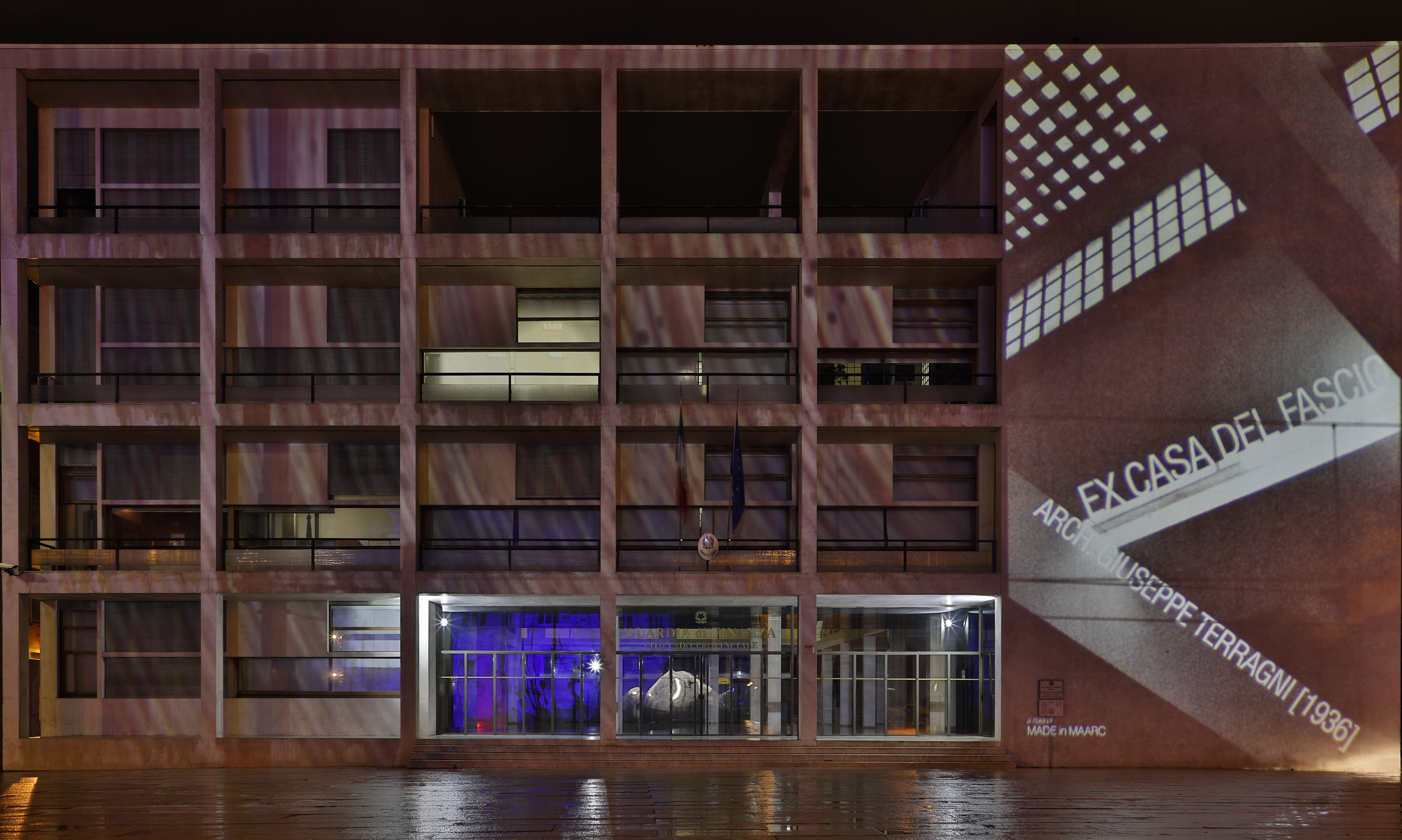
Projections on the main façade

== See also ==
- Casa del Fascio – Italian Fascist Party buildings

== Bibliography ==
=== Sources ===
- Artioli, Alberto (1989). Giuseppe Terragni, la Casa del Fascio di Como. Guida critica all'edificio: descrizione, vicende storiche, polemiche, recenti restauri. Roma: BetaGamma Editrice.
- Artioli, Alberto; Borellini, Gian Carlo, eds. (1996). Giuseppe Terragni: materiali per comprendere Terragni e il suo tempo. Viterbo: BetaGamma Editrice. ISBN 88-86210-09-4.
- Artioli, Alberto; Napoli, Salvatore (2004). "La Casa del Fascio a Como: un'architettura colorata". Architettura e Materiali del Novecento. Conservazione, Restauro, Manutenzione. Marghera-Venezia: Edizioni Arcadia Ricerche.
- Crippa, Maria Antonietta (2006). "Il restauro del moderno, problemi e casi di studio d'architettura". Arte Lombarda.
- Curtis, William J. R. (2006). L'architettura moderna dal 1900. Londra: Phaidon.
- Dal Falco, Federica (2003). Stili del Razionalismo. Anatomia di quattordici opere di architettura. Roma: Gangemi Editore. ISBN 978-8849203431.
- Poretti, Sergio (1998). La Casa del Fascio di Como. Monumenti dell'architettura 4. Roma: Carocci. ISBN 9788843010998.
- Poretti, Sergio (2012). "Specificità del restauro del moderno". Territorio (62). FrancoAngeli Edizioni: 88–94. doi:10.3280/TR2012-062017.
- Saggio, Antonino (1995). Giuseppe Terragni. Vita e opere. Roma: Laterza.
- Terragni, Giuseppe (1936). "Documentario sulla Casa del Fascio di Como". Quadrante (35/36).

=== Further reading ===
- Laura Agostino (2016). Casa del Fascio. Giuseppe Terragni. Santarcangelo di Romagna: Maggioli. ISBN 9788891615091.
- Alberto Artioli (1993). "Alcuni recenti restauri di opere dell'architetto Giuseppe Terragni (1904-1943): "La Casa del Fascio e la Villa del Floricoltore a Como"". Il Restauro dell'architettura Moderna. Viterbo: BetaGamma Editrice.
- Alberto Artioli (1994). "La Casa del Fascio di Como: necessità operative e scelte metodologiche di alcuni restauri". L'Architettura Moderna: Conoscenza, Tutela, Conservazione. Firenze: Alinea Editrice.
- Alberto Artioli (1999). "L'invecchiamento degli interventi di restauro nelle architetture moderne. Due esempi a Como: l'asilo Sant'Elia e la Casa del Fascio di Giuseppe Terragni". Architettura Moderna in Italia: Documentazione e Conservazione. Roma: Edilstampa.
- Alberto Artioli; Davide Adamo; Luca Ambrosini, Marco Longatti (2009). "Palazzo Terragni ovvero ex Casa del Fascio di Como (1932–1936) di G. Terragni. Esperienze di lavoro verso una conservazione programmata". Milano: Electa.
- Luigi Ferrario, Daniela Pastore, ed. (1982). Giuseppe Terragni: la Casa del Fascio. Roma: Istituto MIDES.
- Enrico Mantero (1969). Giuseppe Terragni e la città del razionalismo italiano. Bari: Dedalo libri. ISBN 88-220-0604-6.
- Ada Francesca Marcianò (1984). "Casa del Fascio, Como 1932-1936". Comunicare l'Architettura. Venti Monumenti Italiani. Torino: SEAT.
- Ada Francesca Marcianò (1987). Giuseppe Terragni. Opera completa 1925–1943. Roma: Officina. ISBN 978-8860490483.
- Valeria Pracchi, Federico Busnelli, Sara Mauri, Luca Ambrosini (2017). "Como: ottant'anni di vita della Casa del Fascio di Terragni". Ananke. Quadrimestrale di Cultura, Storia e Tecniche della Conservazione per Il Progetto (80). Altralinea Edizioni.
