= Ercole Drei =

Italian sculptor

- Born: 28 September 1886; Faenza, Italy
- Died: 1 October 1973 (aged 87); Rome, Italy
- Occupation: Sculptor

Ercole Drei (28 September 1886 – 1 October 1973) was an Italian sculptor. His work was part of the sculpture event in the art competition at the 1932 Summer Olympics.
