= Piazza Castello =

Square in Turin, Italy

- City square
- {{{other_names}}}
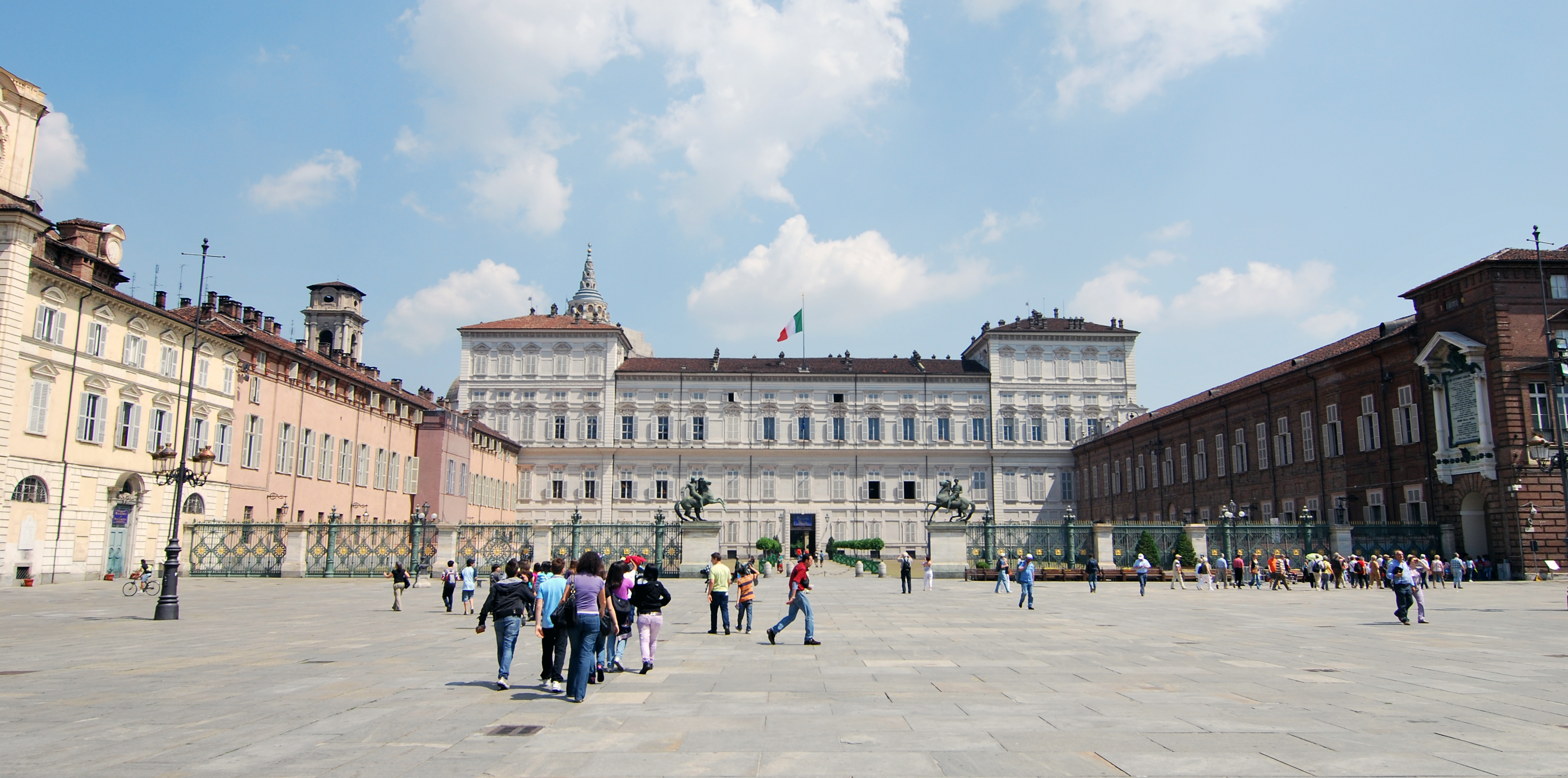
- Piazza Castello
- Location: Turin
- Interactive map of Piazza Castello
- Coordinates: 45°04′16″N 7°41′09″E

Piazza Castello is a prominent city square in Turin, Italy. It houses several city landmarks, museums, theaters and cafes.

== Description ==
The square is rectangular in shape and houses at its center the architectural complex of Palazzo Madama, while the perimeter is made up of elegant porticoes and facades of several city buildings. These are the Royal Armory (to the north ), the Teatro Regio (to the east), two stately buildings on the sides of Via Garibaldi, one of which houses the headquarters of the Piedmont Region (to the west), the Royal Church of San Lorenzo (to the north-west), the Subapline Gallery (to southeast), and the Torre Littoria (southwest). In the northwest the main square joins the smaller Piazzetta Reale, which houses Palazzo Chiablese, the Royal Palace of Turin, and pedestrian passage towards San Giovanni square and the (Turin Cathedral). The square is located 239 meters above sea level.

== Gallery ==
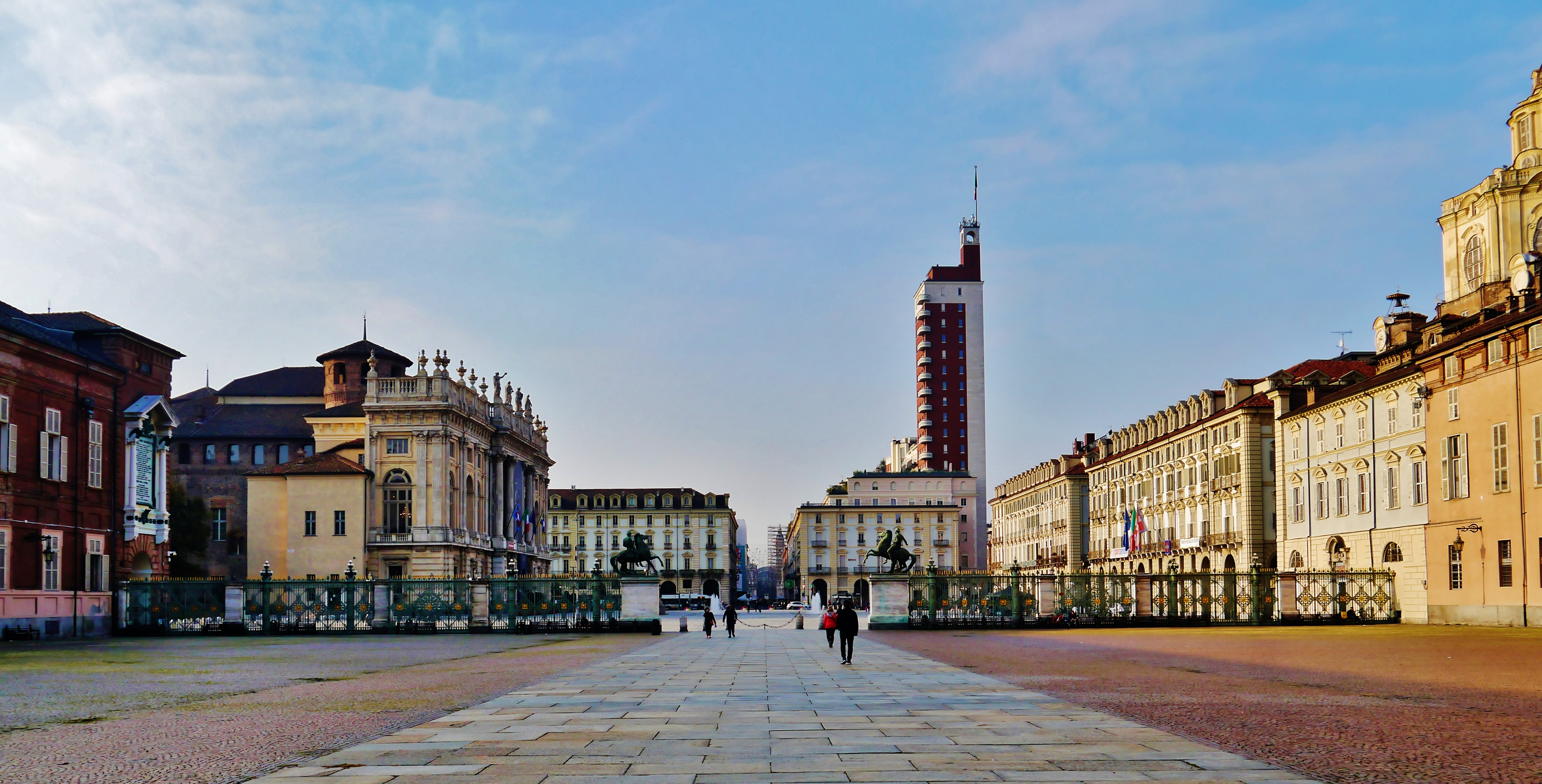
View towards Via Roma with the Torre Littoria

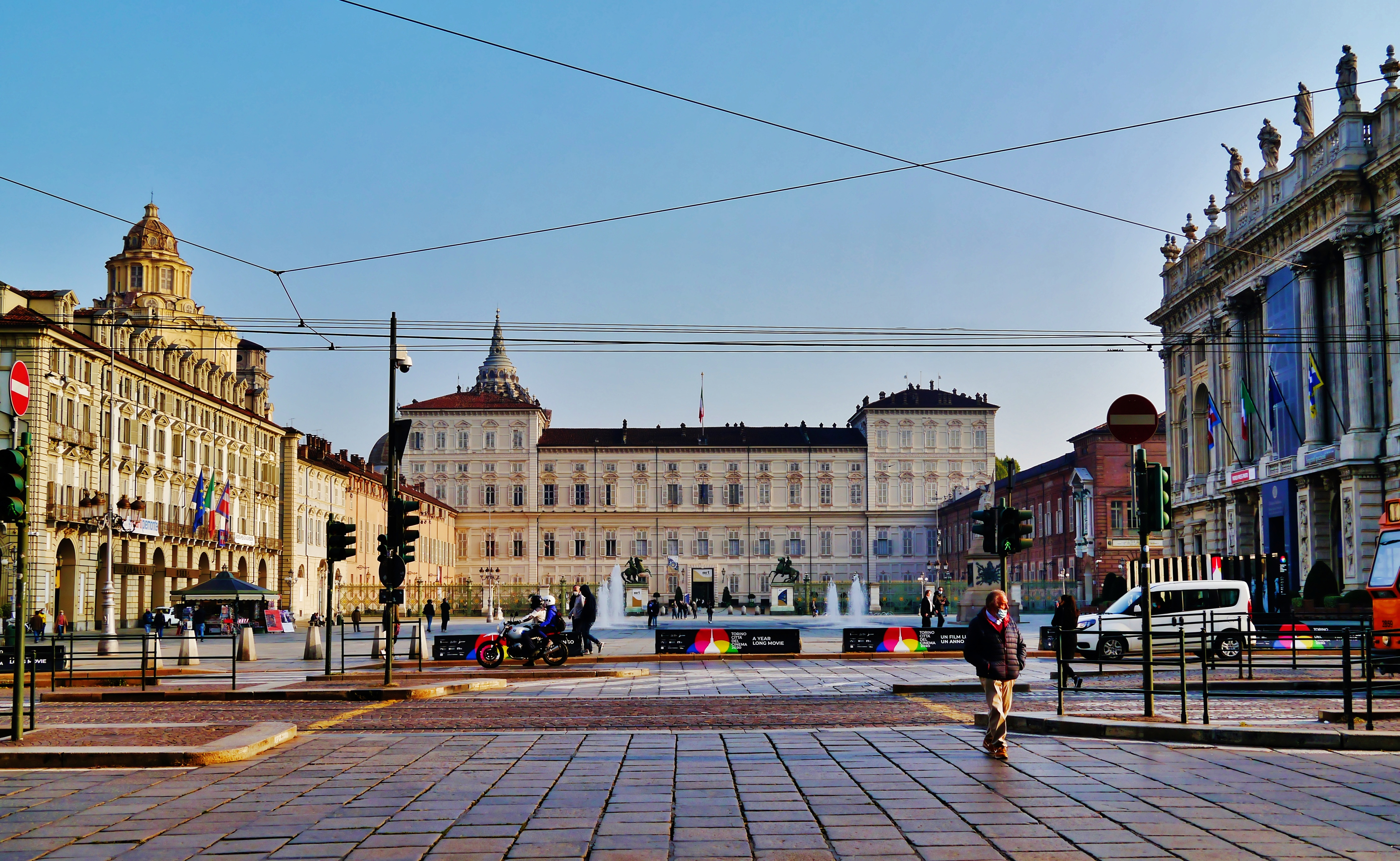
View towards the Royal Palace

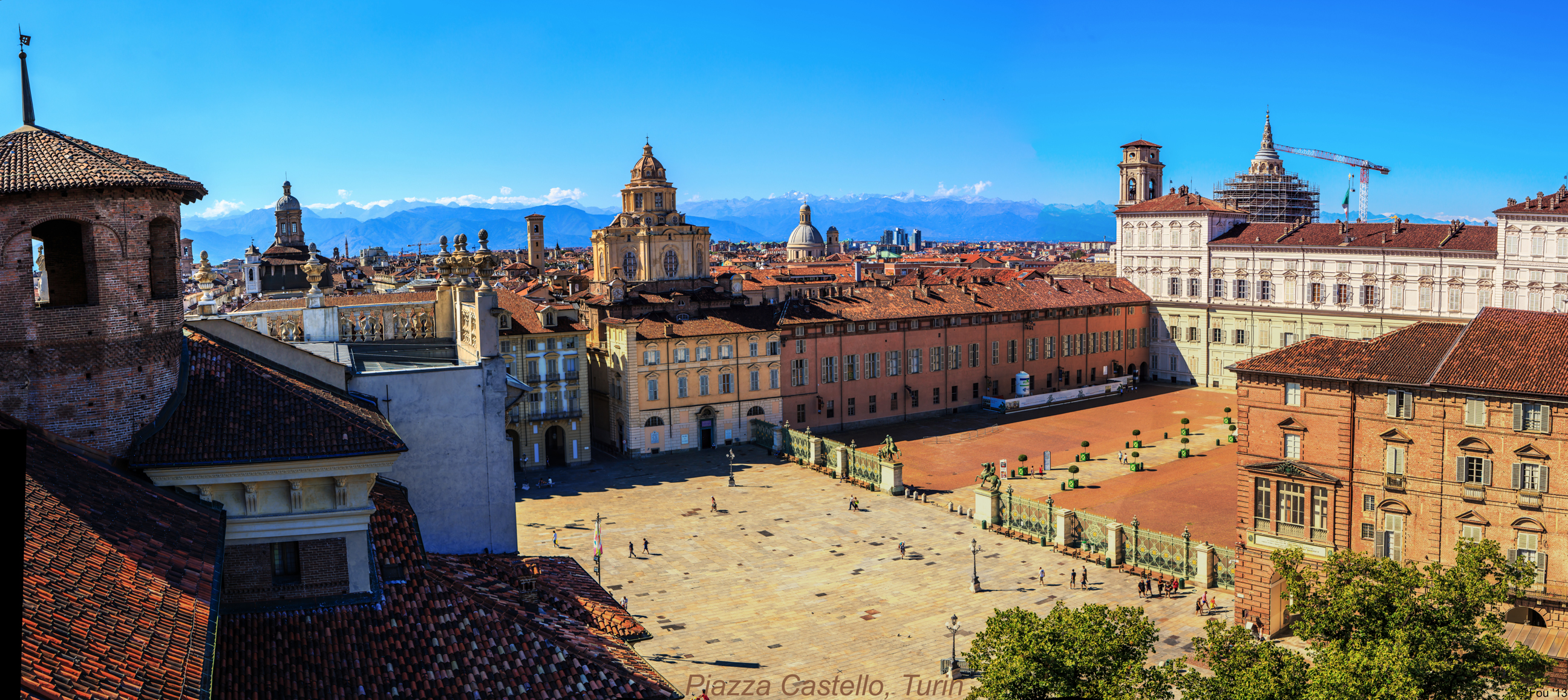
The northern corner, with the church of San Lorenzo, Palazzo Chiablese, the Royal Palace, and in the background the Duomo

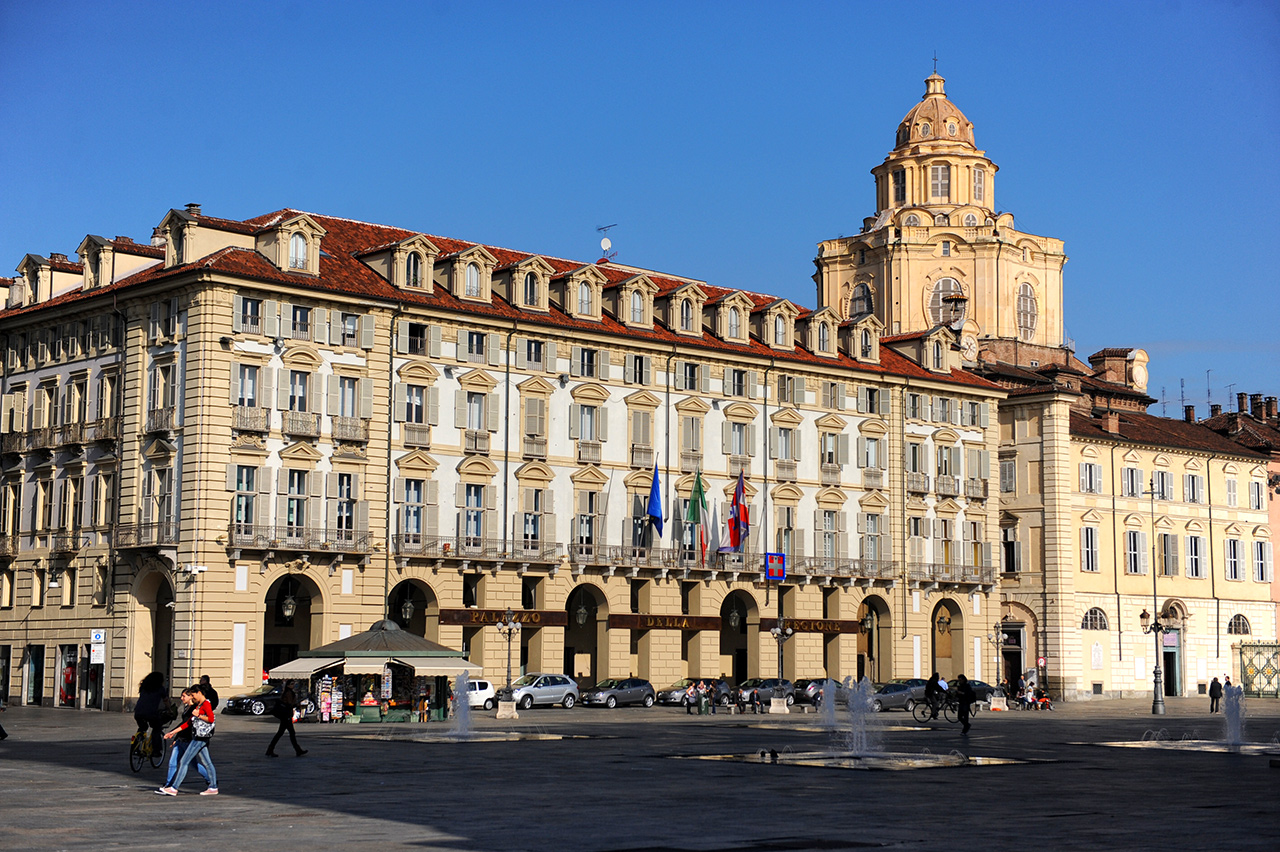
The headquarters of the Piedmont region and the church of San Lorenzo

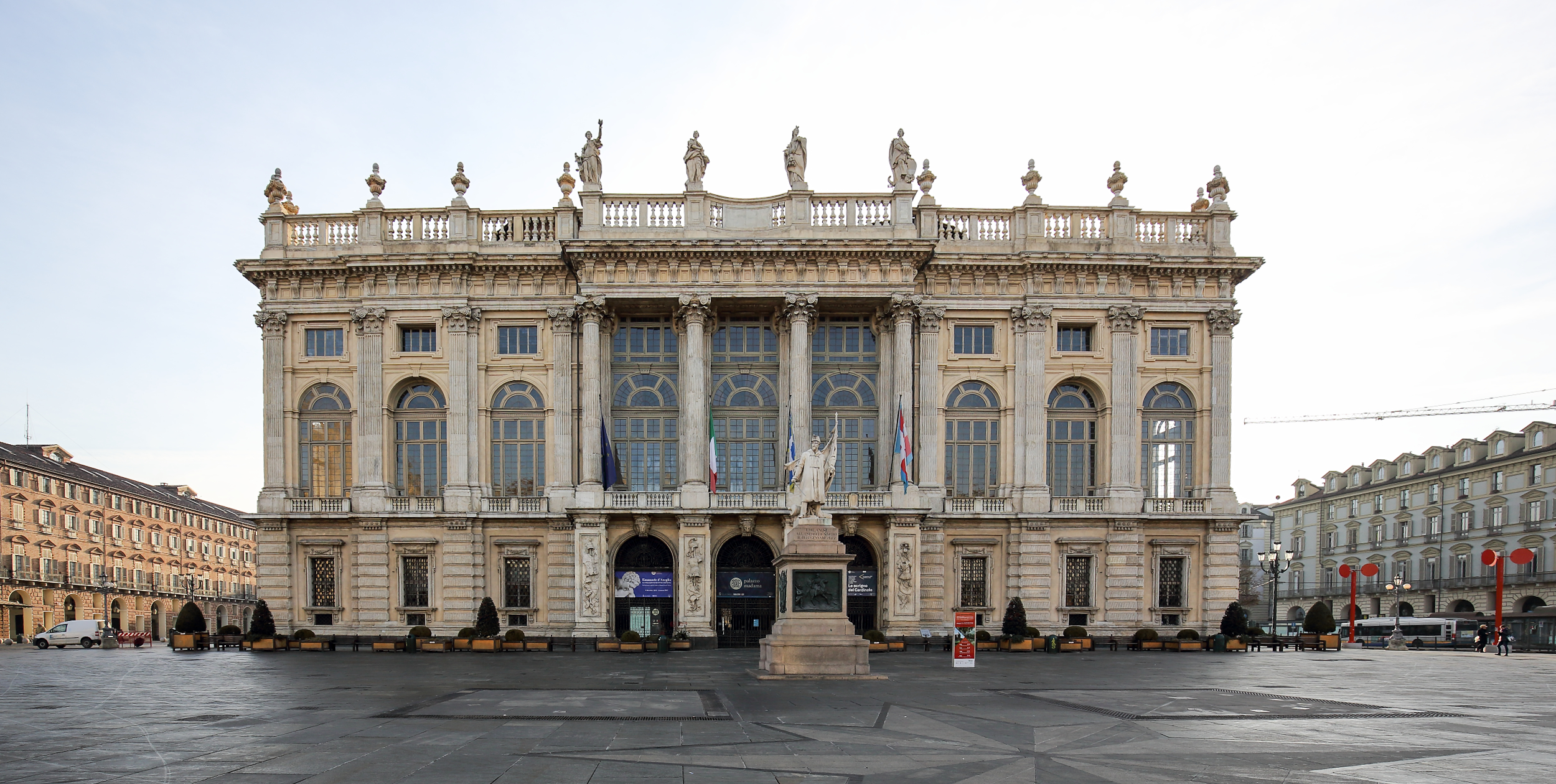
Palazzo Madama at the center of the square

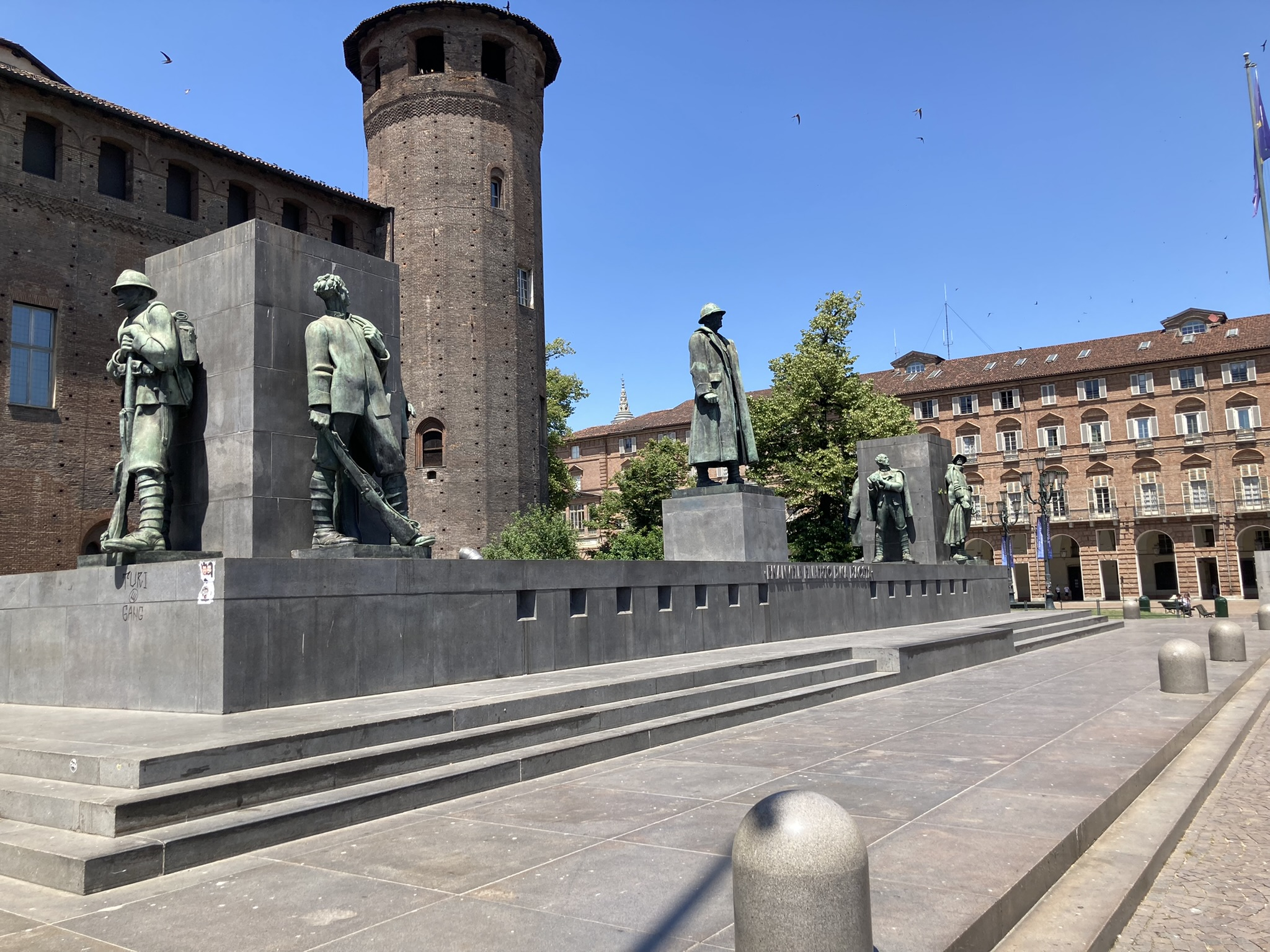
The monument to Emanuele Filiberto Duke of D'Aosta

== Buildings around the square ==
- Royal Palace of Turin
- Palazzo Madama, Turin

== See also ==
- Turin Massacre (1864)
