= Torre Littoria (Turin) =

High-rise building in Turin

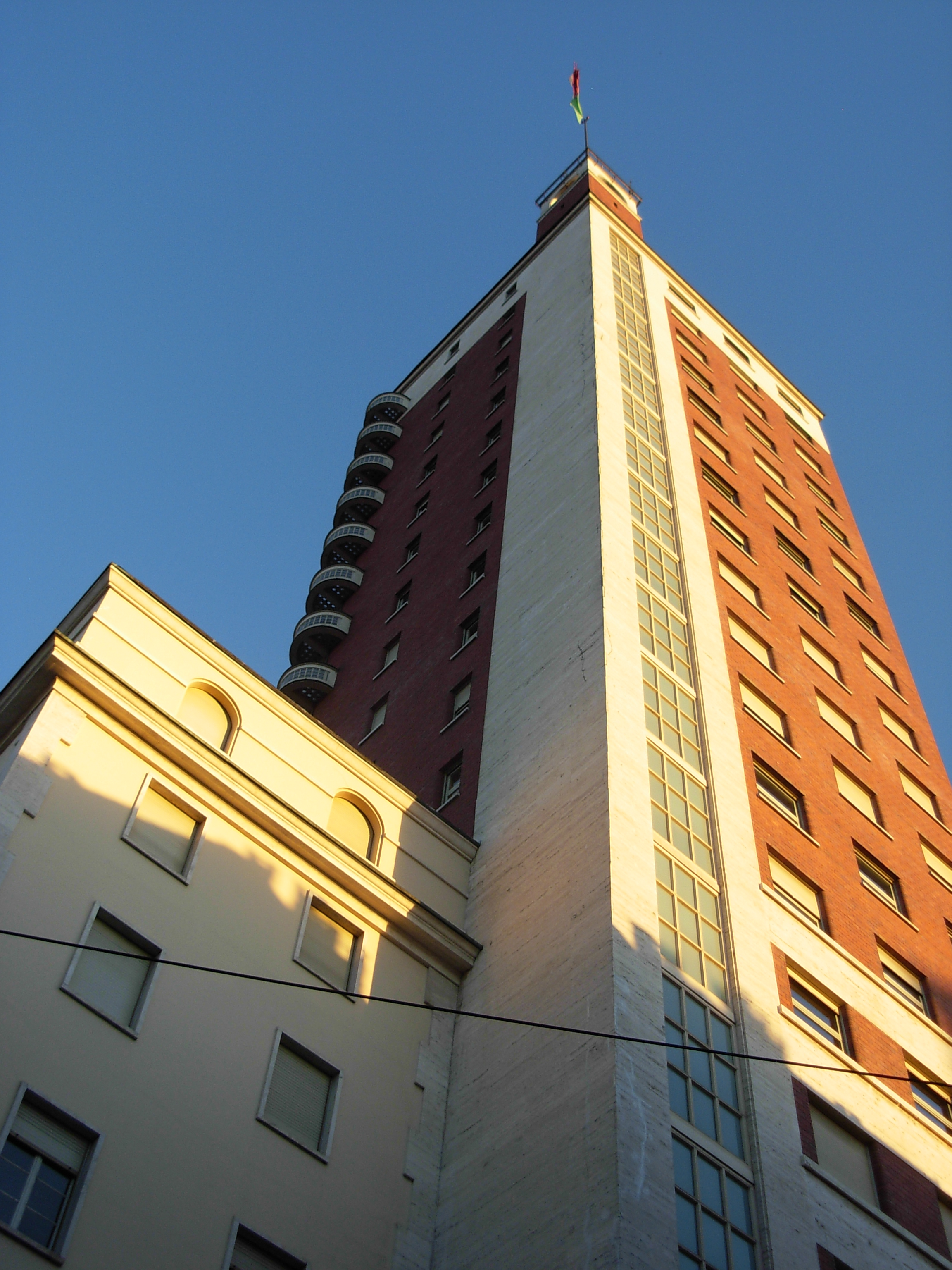
- Interactive map of the Torre Littoria area
- Alternative names: Grattacielo Reale Mutua

General information
- Type: Residential and Commercial
- Architectural style: Italian Rationalism
- Location: Turin, Italy
- Coordinates: 45.07047°N 7.683966°E
- Construction started: 1933
- Completed: 1934
- Opened: 1934
- Owner: Reale Mutua Assicurazioni

Height
- Tip: 109 m (358 ft)
- Roof: 87 m (285 ft)

Technical details
- Floor count: 21 (20 above ground, 1 underground)
- Lifts/elevators: 3

Design and construction
- Architect: Armando Melis de Villa
- Engineer: Giovanni Bernocco, Giorgio Scanagatta

The Torre Littoria of Turin, or Grattacielo Reale Mutua, is a renowned Italian rationalist building and was the first high-rise building in Turin. It was built as a Fascist torre littoria. It faces the Royal Palace of Turin across the Piazza Castello.

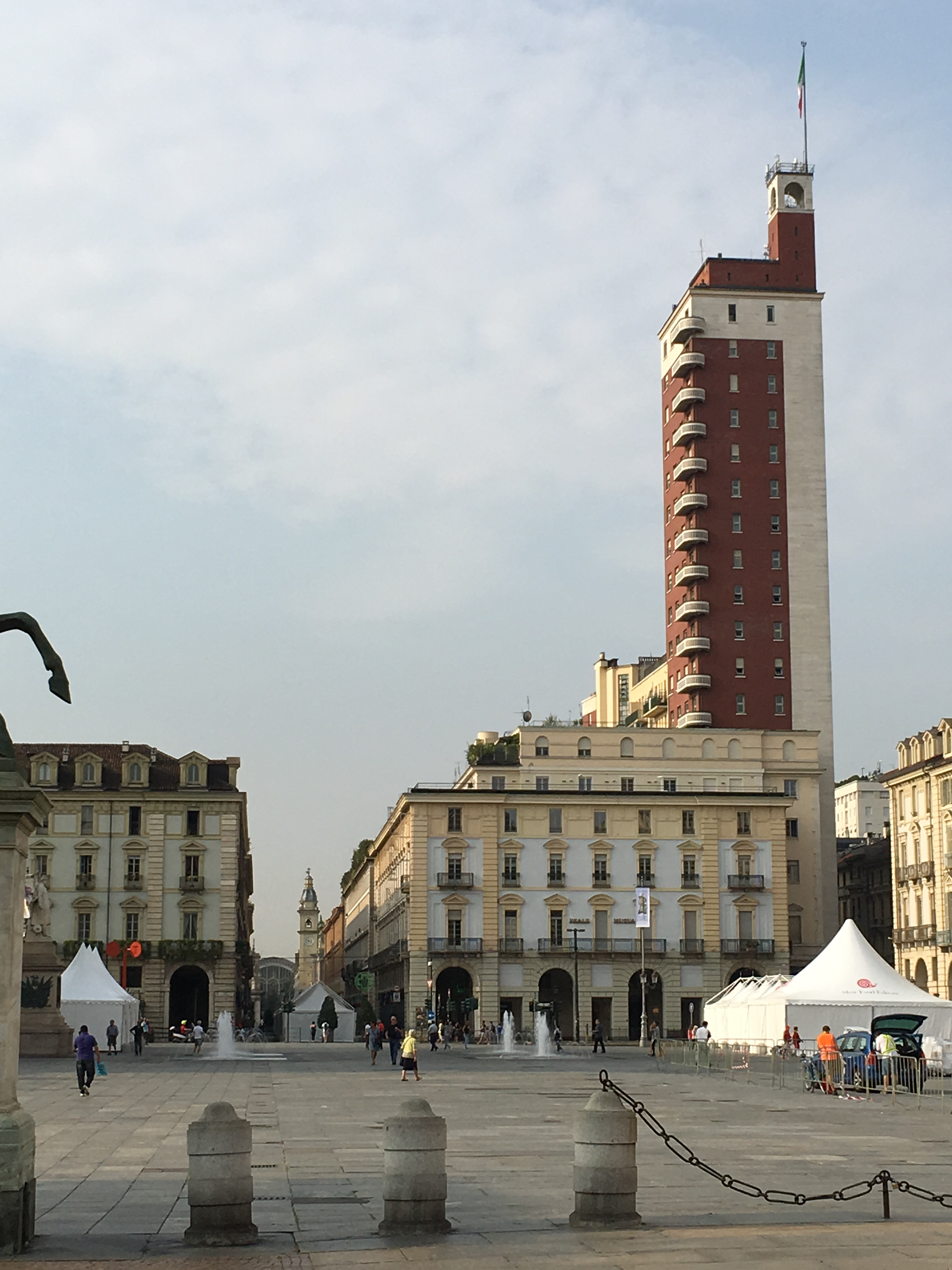
Torre Littoria as seen from Piazza Castello.

Torre Littoria was built in 1933–34, with the intent of hosting, among other offices, the national headquarters of the National Fascist Party; in fact it never did, with the party's headquarters located first in Milan and then in Rome. Instead it became wholly owned by Reale Mutua Assicurazioni (Royal Mutual Insurance), an insurance company that already financed almost all of its costs and is still the owner of the entire property.

The building is a prominent example of early 20th-century Italian rationalist architecture, notable for its widespread use of innovative materials such as glass brick, clinker brick and linoleum, and is also the first Italian building with a welded metal structural frame.

The building occupies a little more than two-thirds of a city block, consisting of a 9-storey low-rise section, and a 19-storey high-rise section reaching 87 metres at its roof, upon which rises an antenna tower, giving the building a total height of 109 metres; until 1940 it was the tallest continuously habitable building in Italy. During World War II its roof mounted one of the 58 air raid sirens in Turin, and the building sustained minor damage during the bombing of 13 July 1943.

The height of the building, in proximity to the Royal Palace of Turin, was regarded as a statement of Fascist dominance over the Italian Royal House of Savoy, and over the years the building has been derided as "an eyesore", "the finger of Duce", "the mobile phone" and "the arrogant tower".

== Sources ==
- La Torre Littoria in Museo Torino, museotorino.it
- Giovanni Sessa, "Via Roma Nuova a Torino", in Agostino Magnaghi, Mariolina Monge and Luciano Re, Guida all'architettura moderna di Torino, Lindau, Torino 1995, pp. 507–517
