= Palazzo Lanfranchi-Toscanelli =

Coordinates: 43.7153°N 10.4055°E

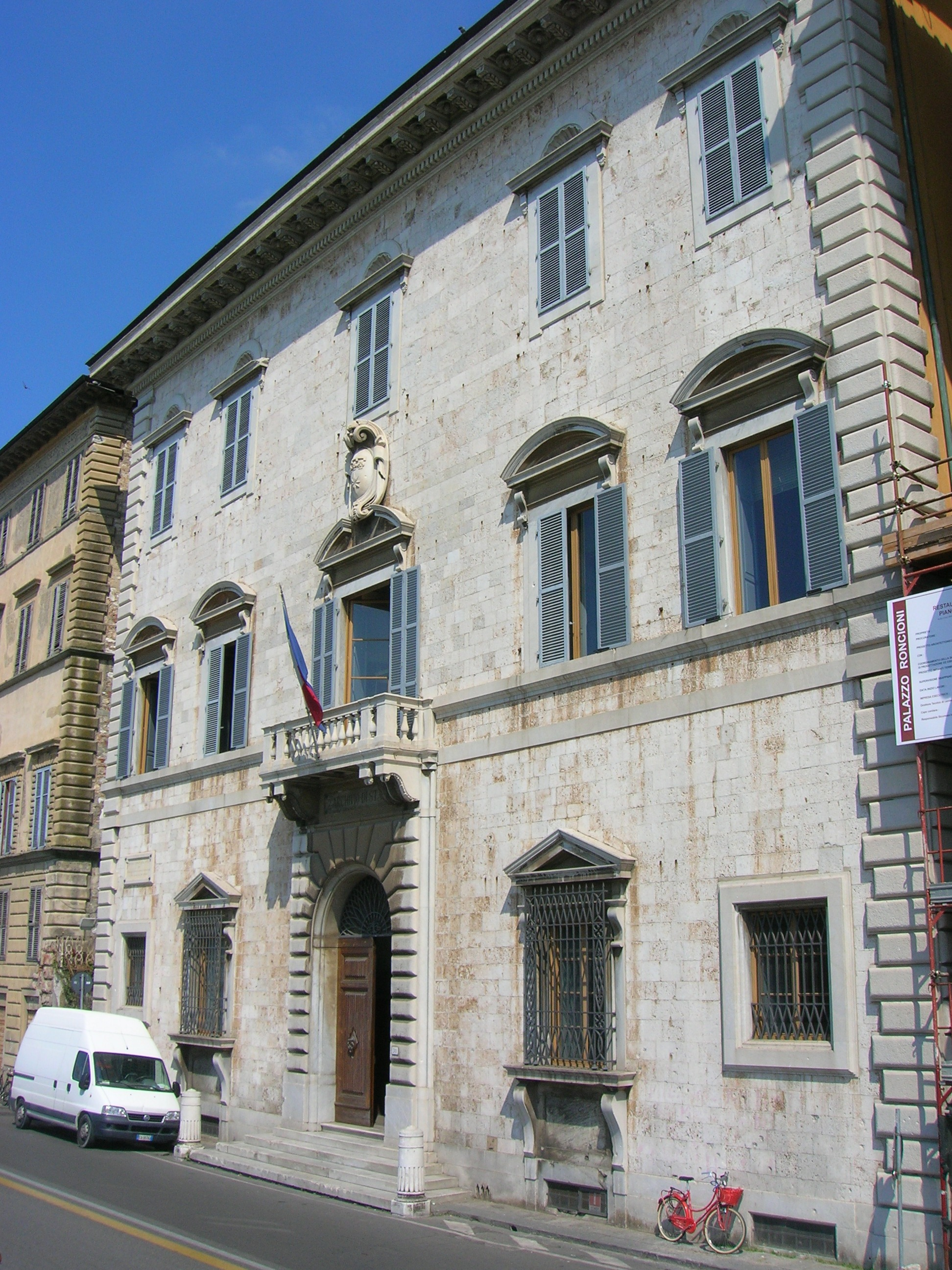
Facade of Palace

The Palazzo Lanfranchi-Toscanelli, presently the local State Archives, is a Renaissance-style palace located on Lungarno Mediceo #30, in the city of Pisa, region of Tuscany, Italy. Since 1913 the building has housed the Archivio di Stato di Pisa.

== History ==
Initially commissioned in the first half of the 16th century by Bartolomeo Lanfranchi. Some authors state that the architect was Michelangelo. A later Palazzo Lanfranchi commissioned by Alessandro stands across the Arno. In 1576, the palace was refurbished using designs by Francesco Mosca.

The recently enriched mercantile Toscanelli family acquired the palace in 1827; and restored it using the architect Alessandro Gherardesca. Giovan Battista Toscanelli and his wife Angiola Cipriani lived in the palace, and garnered a large and prominent art collection. Among the artists in the painting gallery were Cornelis Bloemaert, Agnolo Bronzino, Pietro Ciafferi, Jacques Courtois, Carlo Dolci, Francesco Fidanza, Károly Markó the Younger, Cornelis van Poelenburgh, and Piero Zuccheri. Among the artists employed in decoration of the rooms of the palace in the 1830s were Giuseppe Bacchini, Luigi Venturini, and Benvenuto Brazzini. The palace, once had a peculiar Mannerist marble sculpture, part of a fountain, that displayed a chimeric female figure extruding bare breasts, but possessing wings, fins for feet, and a long tail. She sits atop a frog. The statue has been attributed to either Michelangelo or one of his followers, Silvio Cosini or Niccolo Tribolo. The statue is now in Palazzo Blu in town.

They had the ceilings frescoed (1860s) by Nicola Cianfanelli, Gaspero Martellini, and Annibale Gatti with depictions of secular hagiography showing:

- Lord Byron and Poetry
- Apotheosis of Galileo
- Apotheosis of Michelangelo
