= Teatro de Cristóbal Colón =

Christopher Columbus Theatre
- Teatro de Cristóbal Colón
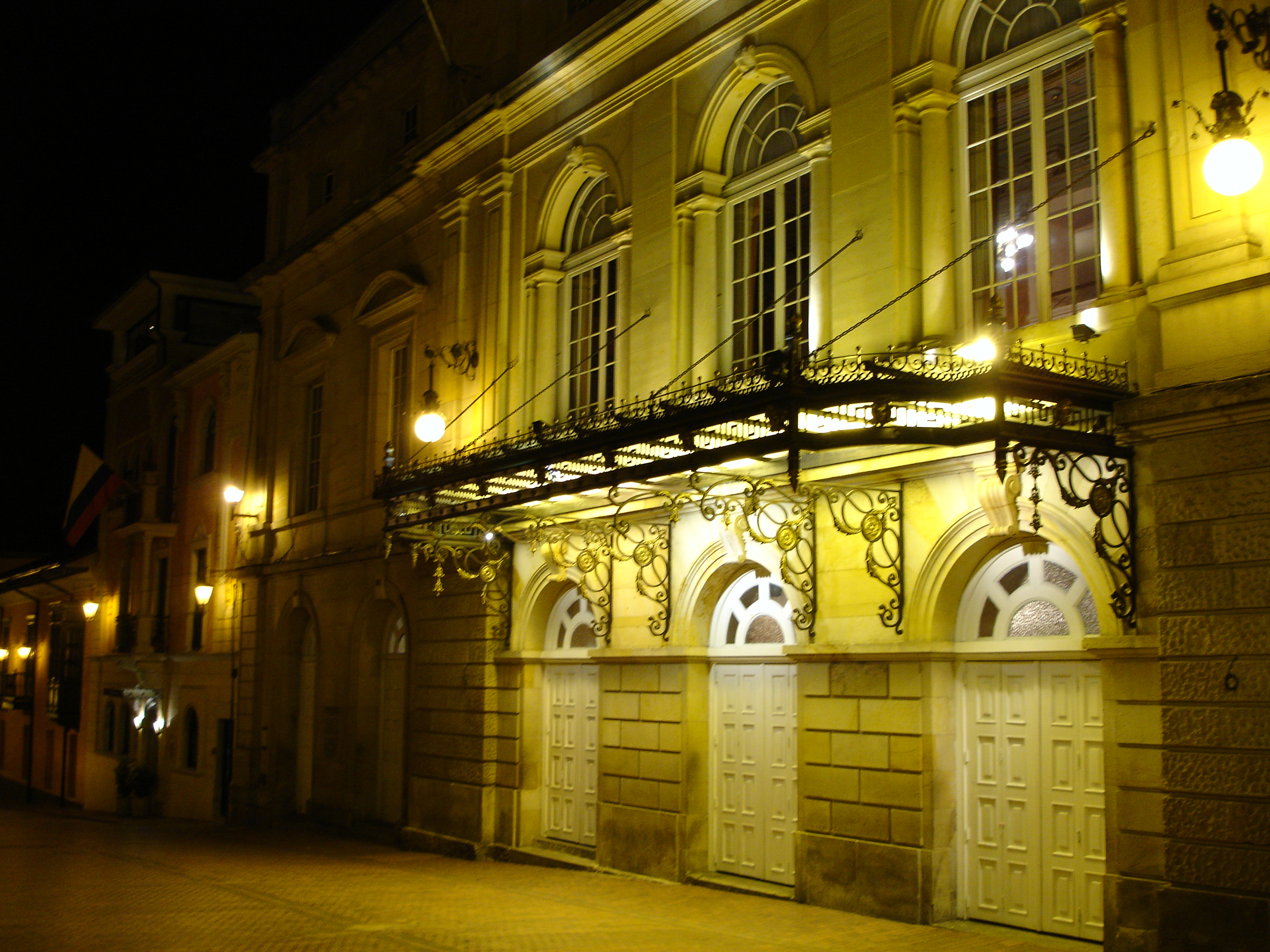
- Facade of the theatre
- Interactive map of Christopher Columbus Theatre
- Address: Cl. 10 # 5-32, La Candelaria; Bogotá; Colombia
- Coordinates: 4°35′48″N 74°04′28″W
- Capacity: 785 spectators
- Type: Theatre

Construction
- Opened: October 12, 1892; 133 years ago
- Architect: Pietro Cantini

The Christopher Columbus Theater (Spanish: Teatro de Cristóbal Colón, or Columbus Theater (Spanish: Teatro Colón), is Colombia's National Theatre, located in Bogotá. It was built in the Neoclassical style by the Italian architect Pietro Cantini on October 5, 1885 and inaugurated on October 27, 1892. on the occasion of the fourth centenary of Columbus' first landing in the Americas with a performance of Verdi's Ernani.

The auditorium was constructed in the tradition horseshoe-shape and modelled on the layout of the Palais Garnier in Paris, but only about half the size. It is located at the former site of the Coliseo Ramírez and the Teatro Maldonado.

The Colón Theatre was declared a National Monument on 11 August 1975, and underwent renovations for three years.

Between 2009 and 2010, the theatre was closed for extensive renovations.

== History ==
The Teatro Colón was built within an area of 2.400 square metres. Its Neoclassical style and its facade was designed following the Tuscan Doric order in carved stone, with three parts separated from each other by cornices also made of stone. It was built by the Italian architect Pietro Cantini, who was also working in the construction of the Capitolio Nacional (National Capitol) at the time. The construction started on 5 October 1885 in the same place where the old Ramírez Coliseum and Maldonado Theatre used to be located.

The Swiss architect Luigi Ramelli was in charge of the ornaments and the decoration of this construction. The theatre was named in honour of Christopher Columbus, and was inaugurated on 12 October 1892 to commemorate the Discovery of America. The Teatro Colón was declared a National Monument by decree 1584 of 11 August 1975.

In 2007, the theatre ranked seventh in a nationwide poll to choose the 7 wonders of Colombia conducted by the El Tiempo newspaper.

On 24 November 2016, the Havana Peace Agreement between the Colombian government (led by Juan Manuel Santos) and FARC (commanded by Rodrigo Londoño) was signed at the Teatro Colón, ending the Colombian conflict.

== Main Hall ==
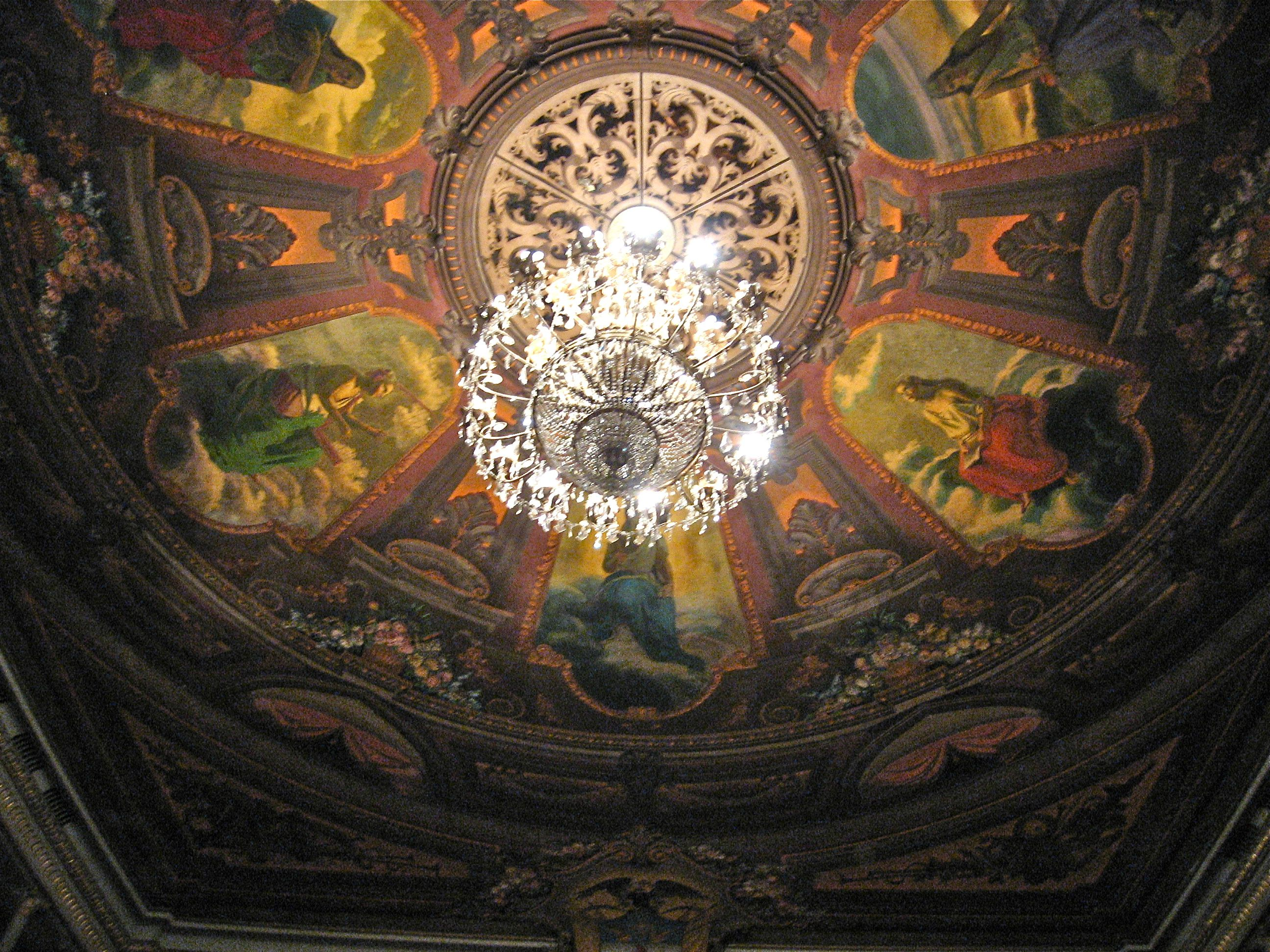
Frescoes of six muses on the ceiling of the main hall

The main hall of the Teatro de Cristóbal Colón was inaugurated on 12 October 1892. Great artists have performed there and many international and national performances of a high artistic level have taken place too.

It has a capacity of 785 seats which is distributed as follows:

Front rows (1 to 9): 140 seats

Rear rows (10 to 19): 197 seats

Centre boxes on 1st floor: 60 seats

Lateral boxes on 1st floor: 60 seats

Centre boxes on 2nd floor: 48 seats

Centre boxes on 3rd floor: 46 seats

Lateral boxes on 3rd floor: 38 seats

Gallery: 148 seats

=== Foyer ===
The foyer is located on the second level of the theatre. In this room the architectural ornamentation of the pilasters, doors and windows stands out as well as the frescoes on the ceiling. Music concerts with small orchestras, chamber music groups and recitals are carried out in it.

Capacity: 120 people

== Victor Mallarino Room ==
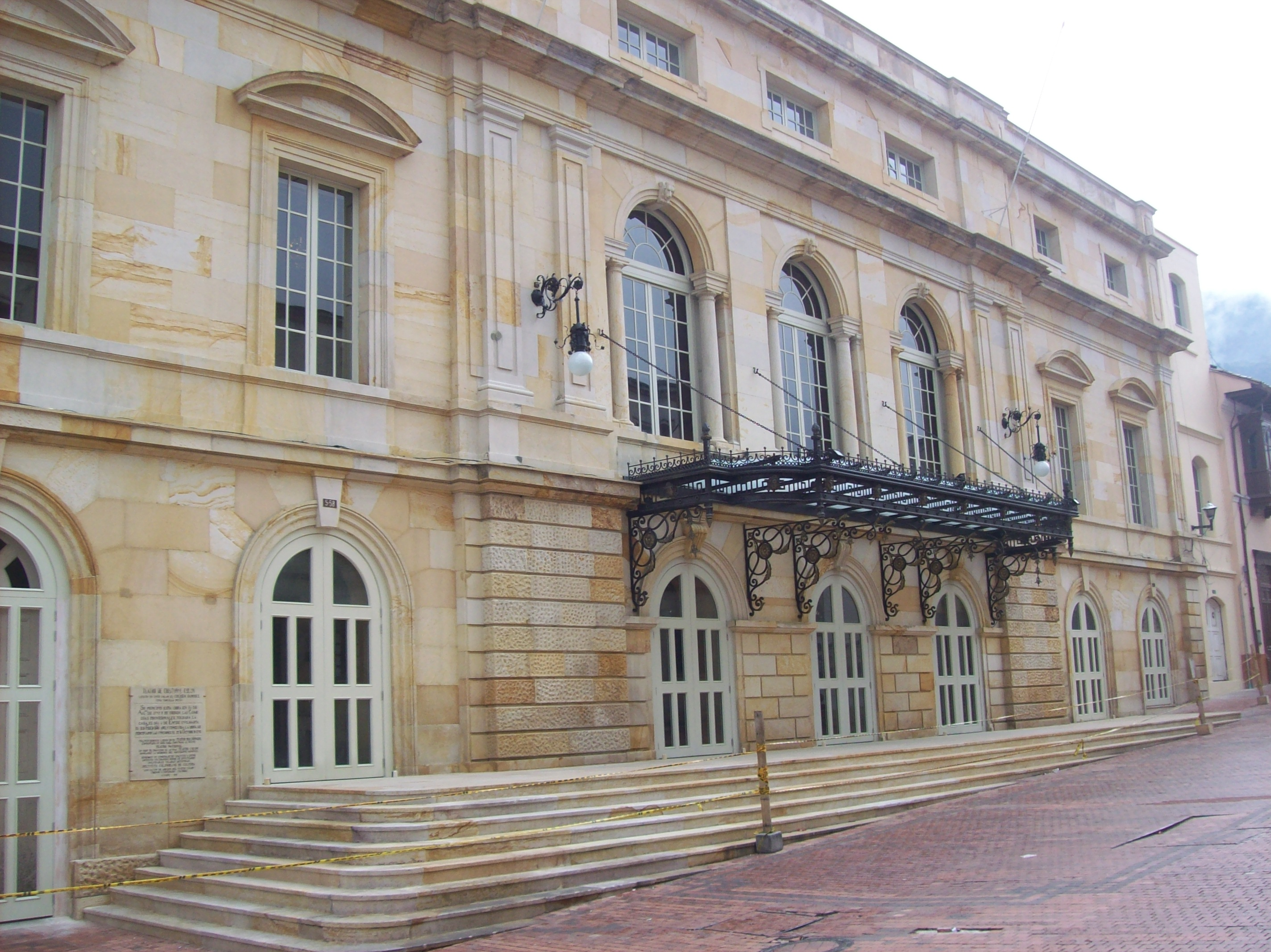
Facade of the Teatro Colón after the restoration carried out between 2010 and 2011.

This scenic space has a particular significance for the emergence of the modern theatre in Colombia. It was here where Bernardo Romero Lozano promoted the creation of the Escuela Nacional de Arte Dramático (National School of Dramatic Arts). Victor Mallarino was among the Spanish teachers that were invited then. He was a notable reciter and actor, and a prominent figure in the formation of this school, where the first actors educated in Colombia emerged, many of whom have contributed to the history of the national theatre.

=== Curtain of Gatti ===
The making of stage curtain was already considered in the contract signed by the government and Antonio Faccini. It was intended to cover the stage during the biggest inaugural functions or during special acts before the commencement of the program, therefore, it was thought it had to be a great work of art.

Florentine artist Annibale Gatti was entrusted with the making of the curtain. It was precisely in Florence where he decided to make his work that was 8.75 metres high and 11.35 wide. The work was completed in 1890 and the curtain was officially hung up on 22 February 1891.

As for the pictures on the curtain, the president Nuñez was inclined for them to portray opera characters. He ordered his commissioners Alejandro Posada, Roberto Suárez, Pietro Cantini and Antonio Faccini to do so. However, Gatti decided to portray the curiosity that people of the town could feel about the construction of the theatre and the lyrical performances at that time. Based on the information provided by the commissioners, he depicted three groups of farmers; men wearing "ruanas" (a type of poncho) and hats, and women wearing white shirts and long skirts. The farmers seemed curious and shared the stage with other 36 characters from different operas such as Romeo and Juliet (Gounod), Otello(Verdi), El Barbero de Sevilla (Rossini), Don Giovanni (Mozart), Ruy Blas (Marchetti), among others.

The first group of farmers was placed on the right, and consisted of five people that paid attention to the explanation of a woman regarding some plans (apparently the facade of the theatre). What is really curious about this image is that the woman making the explanation is a farmer, not a person from an elite class, but a character from the same social class. A second group is located in the centre of the work, and behind the musicians another group can be seen watching the different lyrical characters who are dressed with stunning clothing and jewellery. The idea of Gatti of including rural characters can be interpreted as the need to integrate two worlds, one that is more developed than the other.

President Nuñez showed his disagreement when he saw the draft and sent a letter to the commissioners asking for the figures of farmers to be replaced for more decorative ones. Finally Gatti painted the curtain with the required guidelines, the farmers that had been painted on the right side were replaced by a dance group, the centre and the left ones were also removed and replaced by muses of poetry and music, and an orchestra with ancient instruments was placed in the background.
