= Palazzo Lanfranchi, Pisa =

Coordinates: 43.7140°N 10.4045°E

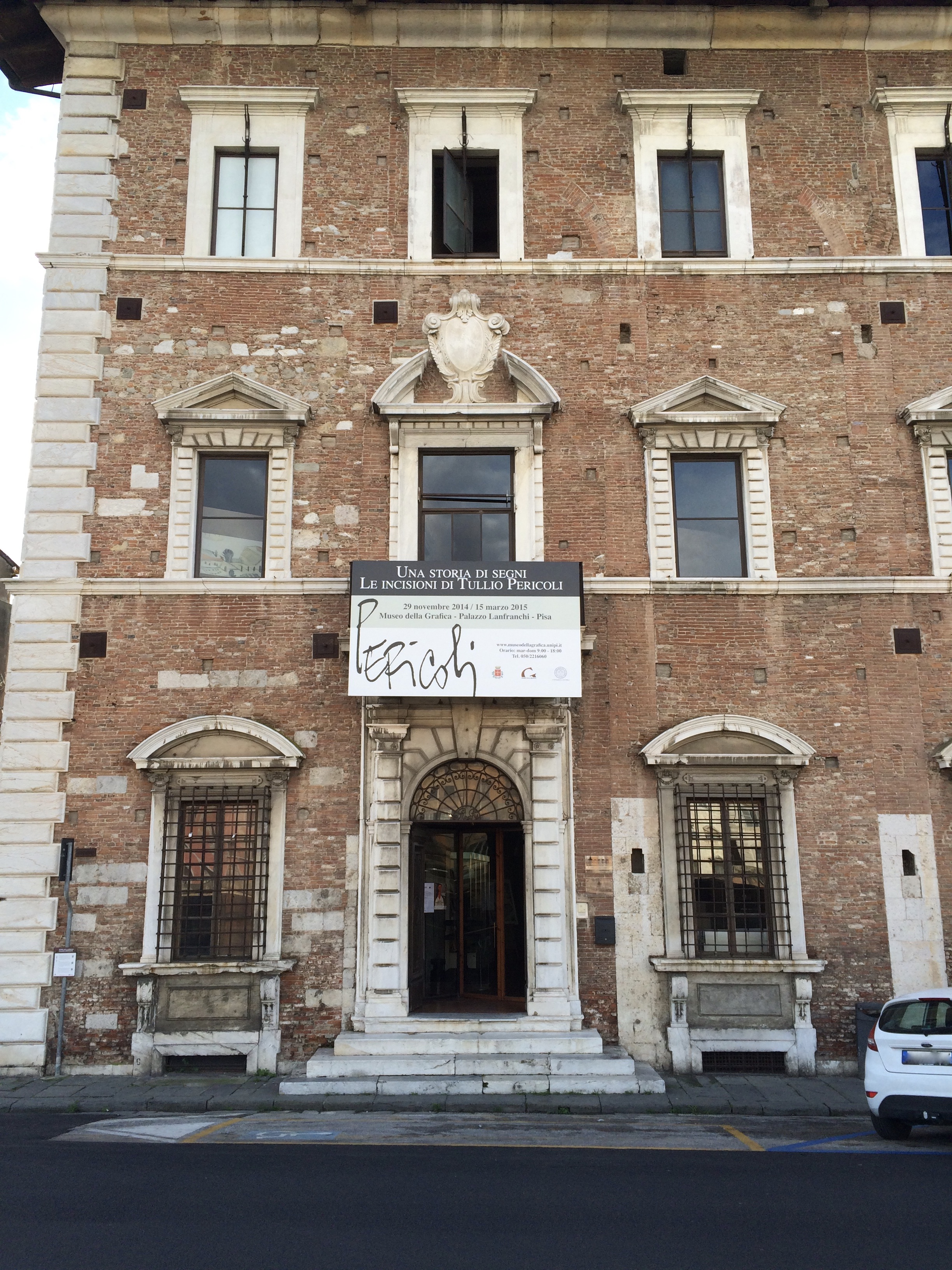
Palazzo Lanfranchi Pisa 4

The Palazzo Lanfranchi is a palace located on Lungarno Galileo Galilei #8, in the city of Pisa, region of Tuscany, Italy.

== History ==
The aristocratic Lanfranchi family included diplomats serving the Medici Dukes of Tuscany; for example, in the 1530s, Albizzi Lanfranchi had been a diplomat for Cosimo I de' Medici. The family had also owned a palace across the Arno, the Palazzo Lanfranchi-Toscanelli. This palace was reconstructed from 1539 to 1555, uniting a series of 13th and 14th-century houses with towers into a single palace. The palace has undergone many renovations, and has housed the Museo della Grafica since 2007.

== Collection ==
The Museum houses the collection of the Gabinetto Disegni e Stampe dell’Università di Pisa; initially curated in 1957 by Carlo Ludovico Ragghianti. Among the collection of prints and engravings included are those of Sebastiano Timpanaro senior, which has many acqueforti by Giovanni Fattori, and 19th and 20th-century works by Renato Birolli, Corrado Cagli, Massimo Campigli, Domenico Cantatore, Felice Carena, Carlo Carrà, Pietro Consagra, Primo Conti, Giorgio de Chirico, Pericle Fazzini, Lucio Fontana, Renato Guttuso, Carlo Levi, Mino Maccari, Mario Mafai, Giacomo Manzù, Marino Marini, Ottone Rosai, Toti Scialoja, Ardengo Soffici, Arturo Tosi, Alberto Viani, Lorenzo Viani, Giuseppe Viviani, Tono Zancanaro, Giorgio Morandi and Luigi Bartolini.

The collection also acquired 20th-century works by Giuseppe Capogrossi, Fabrizio Clerici, Emilio Greco, Ennio Morlotti, Bruno Munari, Achille Perilli, Arnaldo and Giò Pomodoro, Picasso, Aligi Sassu, Vittorio Tavernari, Ernesto Treccani, Emilio Vedova, Alberto Ziveri, and Mario Chiattone.

The museum also includes a collection donated by the Argan family, which has works by Carla Accardi, Luigi Boille, Giuseppe Capogrossi, Primo Conti, Antonio Corpora, Umberto Mastroianni, Luciano Minguzzi, Bruno Munari, Concetto Pozzati, Mauro Reggiani, Guido Strazza, Giuseppe Uncini, and Emilio Vedova.

== Other sources ==
- Un palazzo, una città:il palazzo Lanfranchi in Pisa, Pacini Editore, Pisa 1980
