= Agostino Tassi =

Italian painter (1578–1644)

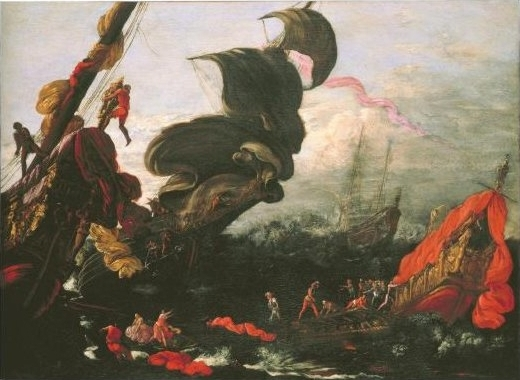
The Fleet of Aeneas, by Tassi

Agostino Tassi (born Agostino Buonamici; bapt. 3 August 1578 – January 1644) was an Italian landscape and seascape painter who was convicted of raping Artemisia Gentileschi in 1612.

== Early life and name ==
Because he aspired to nobility, he modified the details of his early life. Though he was born in Perugia, he claimed to have been born in Rome. His family name was Buonamici, but Agostino adopted the surname Tassi to give substance to his story that he was adopted by the Marchese Tassi. He was actually the son of a furrier named Domenico.

== Career ==
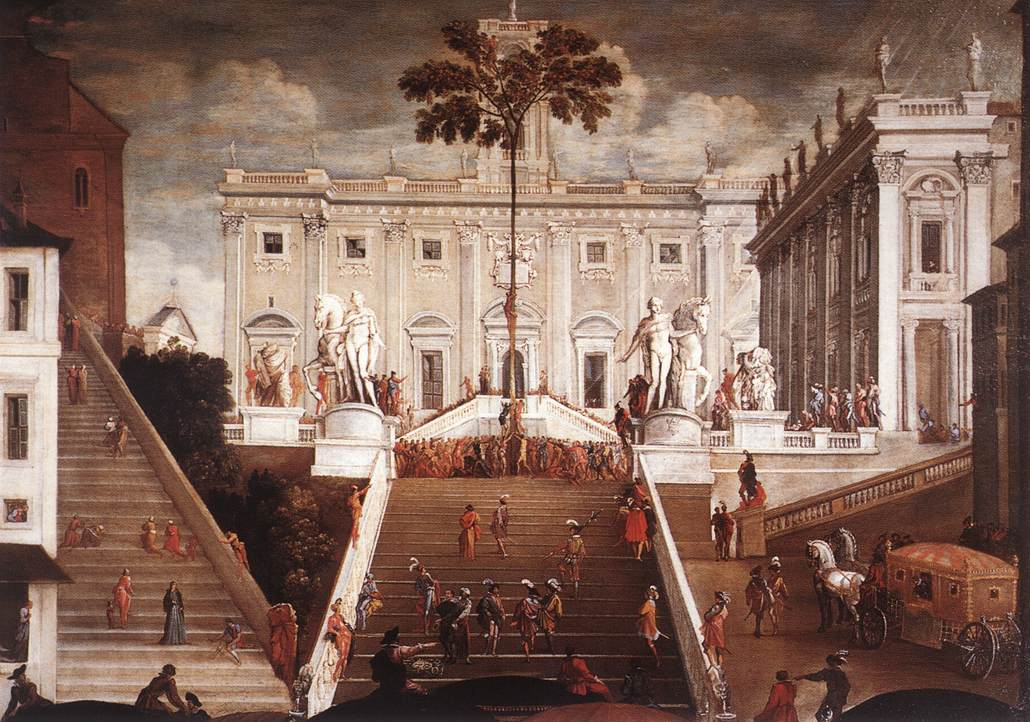
Competition on the Capitoline Hill

Tassi may have worked for a time in Livorno, as well as in Florence. Among his followers or pupils in Livorno is thought to be Pietro Ciafferi. During his sojourn in Florence it is believed that he was made a galley slave in the Grand Duke's convict galleys for some unspecified crime. However, he was allowed to move about freely on the ship instead of pulling on an oar. More importantly, he was able to paint and draw on the galley, and was thus provided with ample material from which to execute his seascapes and images of ports, ships, and fishing scenes.

Regarding his artistic formation, Tassi is said to have been a pupil of Paul Bril, from whom he derived some of his images of the sea. He later worked in Rome with Orazio Gentileschi, who painted figures, after being commissioned by Pope Paul V. During his stay, he raped Orazio's daughter, the painter Artemisia Gentileschi.

Considered a master of perspective and a good painter of illusionistic architectural decoration, Tassi painted in several Roman palaces including the Quirinale (1611–12), the Rospigliosi and the Doria Pamphili (1637).

In Rome, Tassi also served as the master of French painter Claude Lorrain (from April 1625), as well as of Viviano Codazzi and Costanzo de Peris. Tassi hired Lorrain to grind his colors and to do all of the household work.

Though better known as a painter of frescoes, Tassi also painted some canvases, which include Arrival of the Queen of Sheba before Solomon (c. 1610) and Entry of Taddeo Barberini from the Porta del Popolo (1632). His depictions of night scenes had a certain influence on the Dutch Leonaert Bramer.

== Rape conviction ==
In 1612, Tassi was convicted of raping Artemisia Gentileschi, an Italian Baroque painter with an international clientele. Tassi originally denied the accusation, stating, "Never have I had carnal relations nor tried to have it with the said Artemisia... I've never been alone in Artemisia's house with her." He afterwards claimed that he had visited her house in order to safeguard her honor. Tassi had already run afoul of the law, having earlier been accused of raping both his sister-in-law and one of his wives. His wife had been missing for a time, and it was believed that Tassi had hired bandits to kill her.

In the ensuing seven-month rape trial, it was discovered that Tassi had planned to murder his wife and to steal some of Orazio's paintings. At the end of the trial, Tassi was imprisoned for two years. His verdict was later annulled and he was at liberty in 1613. His crime and its impact on Artemisia Gentileschi subsequently influenced the feminist view of her during the late 17th century.

== Death ==
Tassi died in Rome in 1644.

== In popular culture ==
In the 1997 film Artemisia, directed by Agnès Merlet and starring Valentina Cervi, the role of Tassi is played by Serbian actor Miki Manojlovic. The movie, contrary to accepted historical knowledge and Tassi's conviction for rape, depicted the relationship between Tassi and Artemisia Gentileschi as one of mutual passion.

== Sample works ==
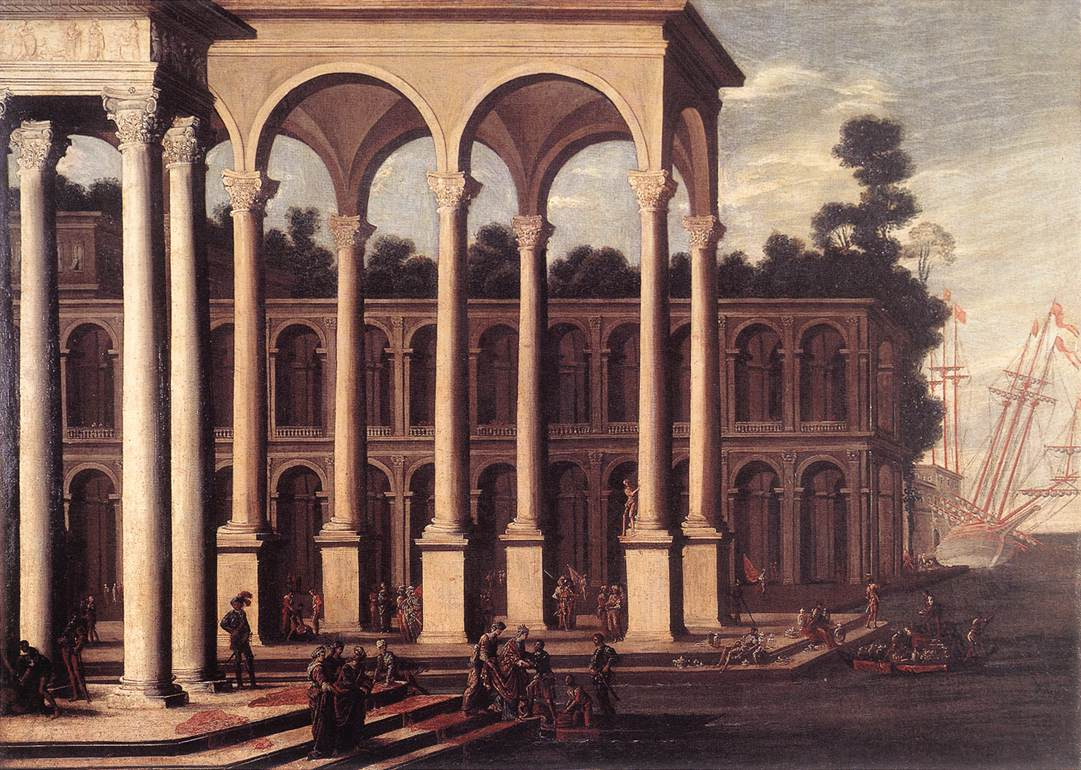
The Embarkation of a Queen, c. 1615

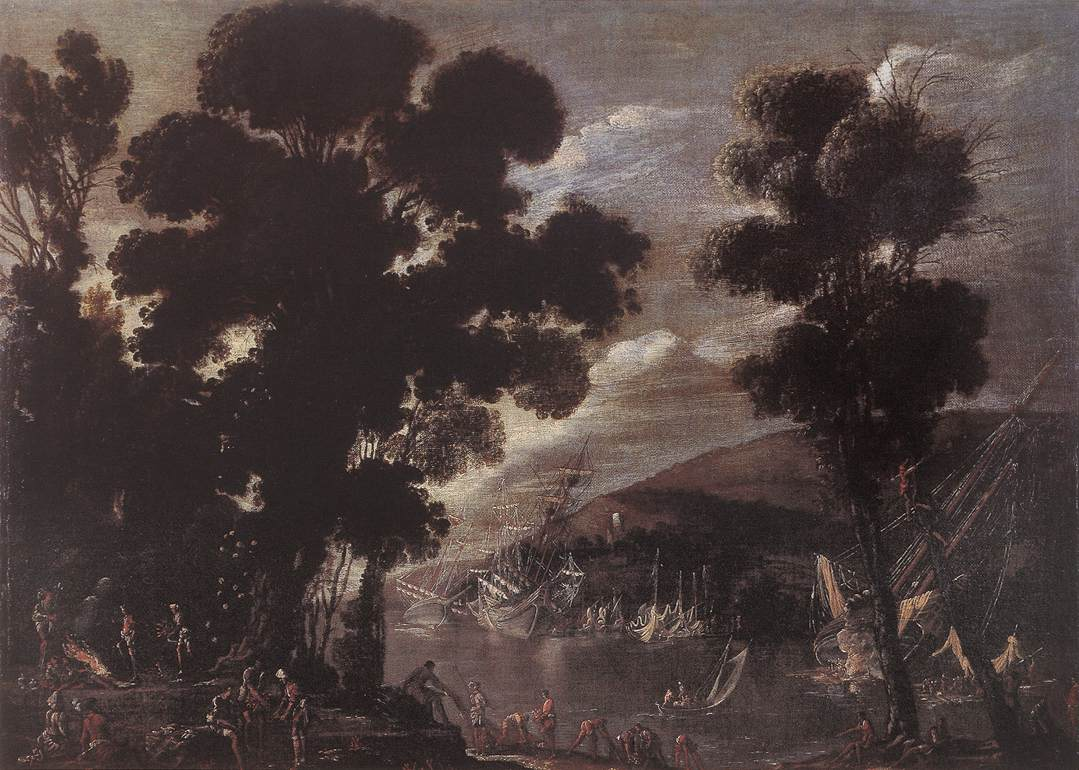
The Coral Fishers, c. 1622

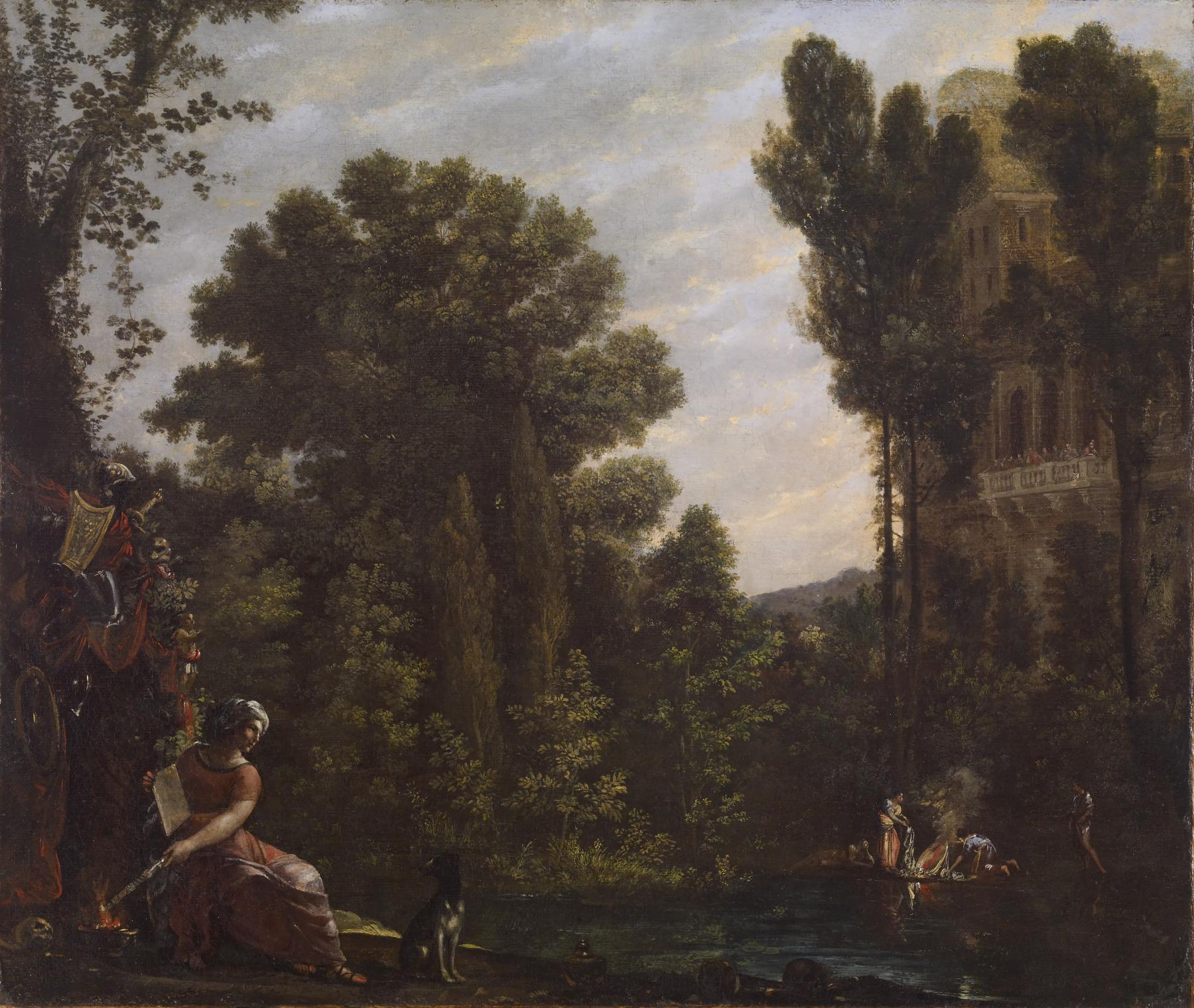
Landscape with a Scene of Witchcraft, between 1620 and 1644
