= Lucchese school =

School of Painting

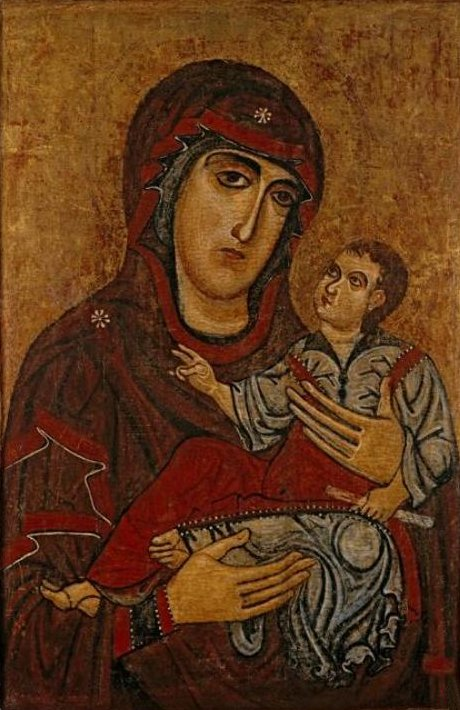
'Madonna and Child', tempera and gold on wood panel by an anonymous painter of the Lucchese school, c. 1200, El Paso Museum of Art

The Lucchese school, also known as the school of Lucca and as the Pisan-Lucchese school, was a school of painting and sculpture that flourished in the 11th and 12th centuries in Pisa and Lucca in Tuscany with affinities to painters in Volterra. The art is mostly anonymous. Although not as elegant or delicate as the Florentine school, Lucchese works are remarkable for their monumentality.

== See also ==
- Bolognese school
- Florentine school
- School of Ferrara
- Sienese school
