= Master of the Castello Nativity =

Italian painter

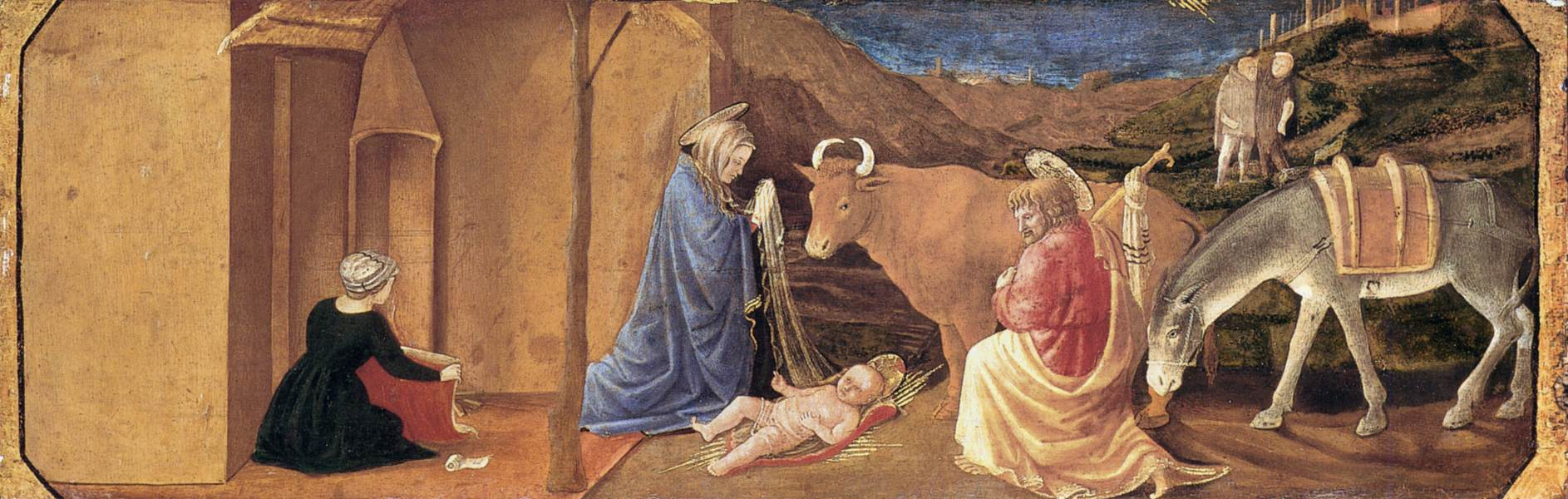
The Castello Nativity

The Master of the Castello Nativity was an Italian religious artist of the mid-15th century. He was a follower of Fra' Filippo Lippi and was probably employed at his workshop in Prato.

== Works ==
His notname derives from a panoramic painting of the Nativity, originally at the Chiesa di San Michele a Castello; now in the collection of the National Gallery in London.

He specialized in paintings for devotional purposes, featuring the Virgin and Child or related scenes. Typically characteristic of his work are the variations in placement and pose of the Child in the Virgin's arms; something which is generally more static.

In 1995, Chiara Lachi, of the Marino Marini Museum, identified him as the young Piero di Cosimo, a proposal that has received little agreement. In the exhibition catalog, Officina pratese, edited by Andrea De Marchi of the University of Florence, speaks of Piero di Lorenzo di Pratese di Bartolo Zuccheri, documented around 1450 as the author of an altarpiece for the Chiesa dei Santi Giusto e Clemente a Faltugnano, as a possible candidate. That work is now divided between museums in Prato, London and Philadelphia.

== Bibliography ==
- Andrea De Marchi e Cristina Gnoni Mavarelli (a cura di), Da Donatello a Lippi, Officina pratese, catalogo della mostra, Skira, Milano 2013. ISBN 978-88-572-2039-0
