= Pietro Ciafferi =

Italian 17th-century painter

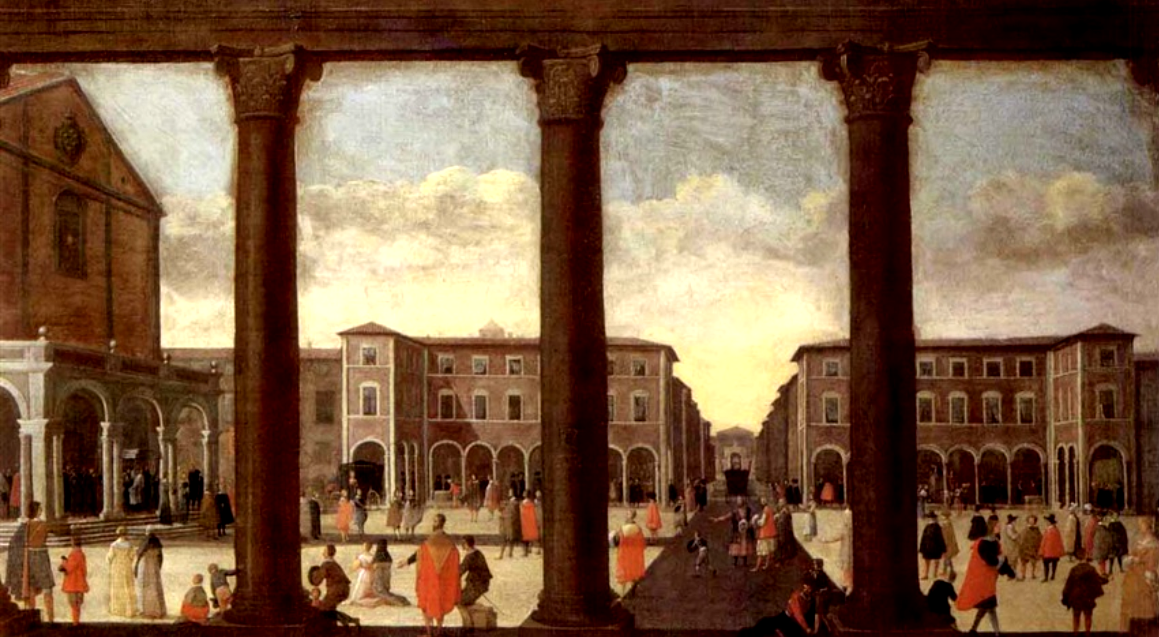
Pietro Ciafferi, The Cathedral Square of Livorno, 1650 approx., private collection

Pietro Ciafferi or Ciaffero (c. 1600 in Pisa – fl. until 1654 at least), nicknamed Lo Smargiasso ("The Braggart"), was an Italian painter of the Florentine school. He painted marine subjects and seaports, which his residence at Livorno enabled him to study from nature, as well as architectural and perspective views and sacred subjects. His works are highly finished, and ornamented with small detailed figures; they are principally preserved at Pisa and Livorno. An Ecce Homo by him is in the Pitti Palace, Florence.
