= Primo Conti =

- Born: 16 October 1900; Florence, Kingdom of Italy
- Died: 12 November 1988 (aged 88); Fiesole, Italy
- Known for: Painting, music
- Movement: Futurism

Primo Conti (16 October 1900 – 12 November 1988) was an Italian futurist artist.

== Life ==
Conti was born in Florence. Between the ages of 8 and 9, he showed precocious talent in the fields of music, poetry and painting. In 1913 he met the Futurists.

His attraction to the latest innovations was expressed in almost completely Futurist forms in his drawings, while he developed a unique style in his painting that was a mixture of Art Nouveau, Fauvism, Expressionism and Orphism. It was not until 1917, after meeting with Giacomo Balla in Rome, and with Filippo Tommaso Marinetti in Naples (who later enthusiastically praised Conti's book Imbottigliature which was about to be printed) that Conti became part of the Futurist movement. His contribution to the movement was not only his literary works but also the paintings and drawings he produced between 1917 and 1919—the years in which his work was taking on the metaphysical style.

The 1920s were a complex period for Conti. He explored Mannerism, Exoticism, Pittura Metafisica, and great historical and religious painting, covering a vast area that can be compared with his keen interest in the theatrical and literary world of Luigi Pirandello, Massimo Bontempelli and Enrico Pea, which led him to found the Viareggio Prize in 1929. The 1930s brought a series of alternating events that created problems in his private life and led to his celebrative paintings. The decade also saw his enforced adhesion to Fascism (joining the Partito Nazionale Fascista), and his inner rebellion against it which transpired from his refusal to join Margherita Sarfatti's Novecento Italiano group and from other episodes when he stepped out of line. New prospects were only opened up to him when he became involved in designing stage sets for the opera house with the foundation of the Maggio Musicale Fiorentino.

By the 1940s, long before the official rediscovery (20 years later) of the Futurist movement, Conti was again working on Futurist subjects and experiments. From 1948 to 1963 he followed the rules of the Order of the Franciscans, though he still continued to paint.

Many of his works are housed in the Museo Primo Conti (Primo Conti Foundation Museum ) in the Villa le Coste at Fiesole (near Florence).
