= Piero di Lorenzo di Pratese di Bartolo Zuccheri =

Italian painter

Piero di Lorenzo di Pratese di Bartolo Zuccheri (active 15th century) was an Italian painter. His exact dates of birth and death are not known.

Not much is known about Zuccheri except through his works. He was active in San Gimignano, and primarily painted religious-themed works for church commissions. There are a lot of similarities between his style and that of the painter Pier Francesco Fiorentino, therefore attributions have been difficult in many cases. Virgin and Child with a Goldfinch and the Infant Saint John, which has been attributed to both Fiorentino and Zuccheri, currently resides at the Courtauld Gallery. He has been proposed as the Master of the Castello Nativity.
