= Florentine painting =

Naturalistic painting style developed in the 14th century Florence

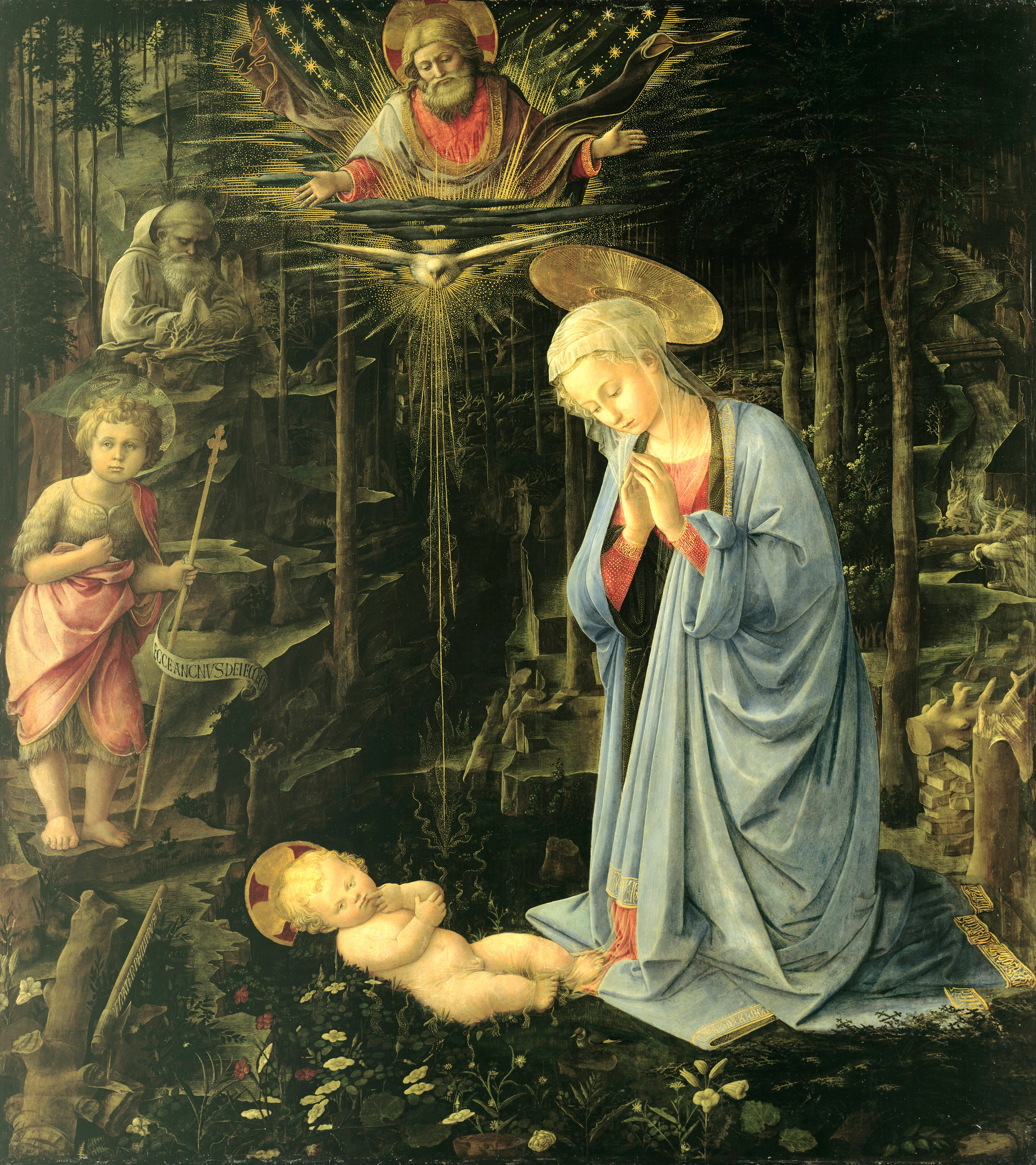
Filippo Lippi, Adoration in the Forest, by 1459

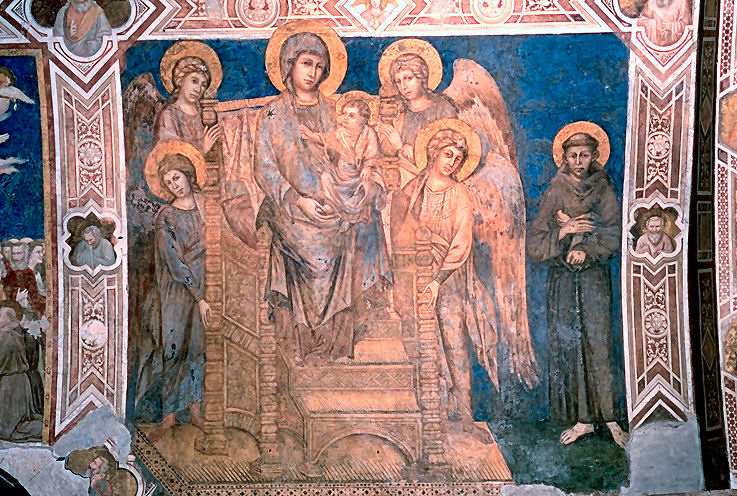
Cimabue, Madonna of Santa Trinita, c. 1285, once in the church of Santa Trinita, now in the Uffizi Gallery

Florentine painting or the Florentine school refers to artists in, from, or influenced by the naturalistic style developed in Florence in the 14th century, largely through the efforts of Giotto di Bondone, and in the 15th century the leading school of Western painting. Some of the best known painters of the earlier Florentine School are Fra Angelico, Botticelli, Filippo Lippi, the Ghirlandaio family, Masolino, and Masaccio.

Florence was the birthplace of the High Renaissance, but in the early 16th century the most important artists, including Michelangelo and Raphael were attracted to Rome, where the largest commissions then were. In part this was following the Medici family, some of whom became cardinals and even the pope. A similar process affected later Florentine artists. By the Baroque period, the many painters working in Florence were rarely major figures.

== Before 1400 ==
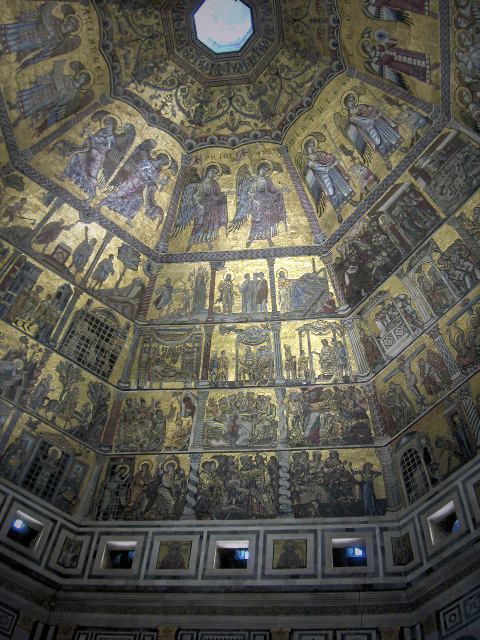
Mosaic ceiling of the Baptistery of St John in Florence, dating from around 1225.

The earliest distinctive Tuscan art, produced in the 13th century in Pisa and Lucca, formed the basis for later development. Nicola Pisano showed his appreciation of Classical forms as did his son, Giovanni Pisano, who carried the new ideas of Gothic sculpture into the Tuscan vernacular, forming figures of unprecedented naturalism. This was echoed in the work of Pisan painters in the 12th and 13th centuries, notably that of Giunta Pisano, who in turn influenced such greats as Cimabue, and through him Giotto and the early 14th-century Florentine artists.

The oldest extant large scale Florentine pictorial project is the mosaic decoration of the interior of the dome of the Baptistery of St John, which began around 1225. Although Venetian artists were involved in the project, the Tuscan artists created expressive, lively scenes, showing emotional content unlike the prevailing Byzantine tradition. Coppo di Marcovaldo is said to have been responsible for the central figure of Christ and is the earliest Florentine artist involved in the project. Like the panels of the Virgin and Child painted for the Servite churches in Siena and Orvieto, sometimes attributed to Coppo, the Christ figure has a sense of volume.

Similar works were commissioned for the Florentine churches of Santa Maria Novella, Santa Trinita and Ognissanti in the late 13th century and early 14th century. Duccio's panel of around 1285, Madonna with Child enthroned and six Angels or Rucellai Madonna, for the Santa Maria Novella, now in the Uffizi Gallery, shows a development of the naturalistic space and form, and may not have been originally intended as altarpieces. Panels of the Virgin were used at top of rood screens, as at the Basilica of San Francesco d'Assisi, which has the panel in the fresco of the Verification of the Stigmata in the Life of Saint Francis cycle. Cimabue's Madonna of Santa Trinita and Duccio's Rucellai Madonna do, however, retain the earlier stylism of showing light on drapery as a network of lines.

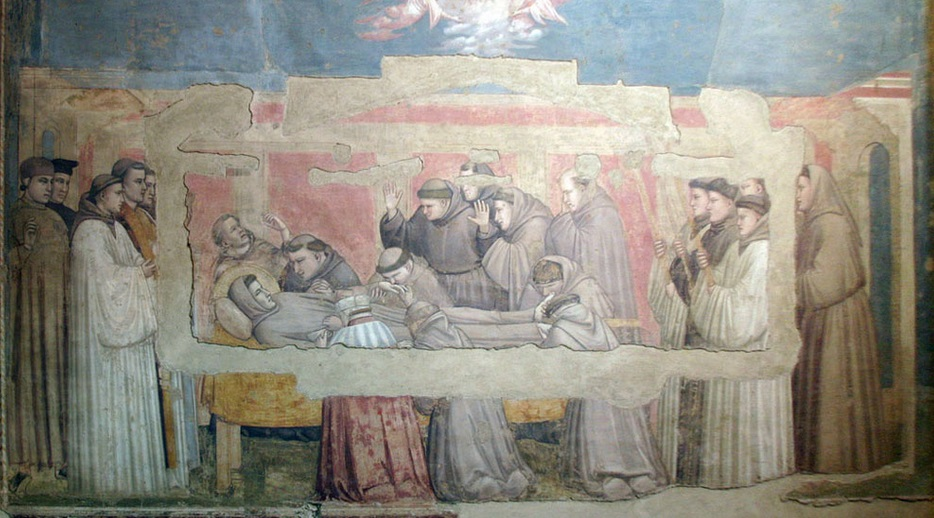
Giotto's fresco, the Mourning of St. Francis in the Bardi chapel of Santa Croce.

Giotto's sense of light would have been influenced by the frescoes he had seen while working in Rome, and in his narrative wall paintings, particularly those commissioned by the Bardi family, his figures are placed in naturalistic space and possess dimension and dramatic expression. A similar approach to light was used by his contemporaries such as Bernardo Daddi, their attention to naturalism was encouraged by the subjects commissioned for 14th-century Franciscan and Dominican churches, and was to influence Florentine painters in the following centuries. While some were traditional compositions such as those dealing with the order's founder and early saints, others, such as scenes of recent events, people and places, had no precedent, allowing for invention.

The 13th century witnessed an increase in demand for religious panel painting, particularly altarpieces, although the reason for this is obscure, early 14th-century Tuscan painters and woodworkers created altarpieces which were more elaborate, multipanelled pieces with complex framing. Contracts of the time note that clients often had a woodwork shape in mind when commissioning an artist, and discussed the religious figures to be depicted with the artists. The content of the narrative scenes in predella panels however are rarely mentioned in the contracts and may have been left to the artists concerned. Florentine churches commissioned many Sienese artists to create altar pieces, such as Ugolino di Nerio, who was asked to paint a large scale work for the altar for the Basilica di Santa Croce, which may have been the earliest polyptych on a Florentine altar. The guilds, cognizant of the stimulus that external craftmanship brought, made it easy for artists from other areas to work in Florence. Sculptors had their own guild which held minor status, and by 1316 painters were members of the influential Arte dei Medici e Speziali. The guilds themselves became significant patrons of art and from the early 14th century various major guilds oversaw the upkeep and improvement of individual religious buildings; all the guilds were involved in the restoration of Orsanmichele.

The naturalism developed by the early Florentine artists waned during the third quarter of the 14th century, likely as a consequence of the plague. Major commissions, such as the altarpiece for the Strozzi family (dating from around 1354–57) in Santa Maria Novella, were entrusted to Andrea di Cione, whose work, and in that of his brothers, are more iconic in their treatment of figures and have an earlier sense of compressed space.

== Early Renaissance, after 1400 ==
Florence continued to be the most important centre of Italian Renaissance painting. The earliest truly Renaissance images in Florence date from 1401, the first year of the century known in Italian as Quattrocento, synonymous with the Early Renaissance; however, they are not paintings. At that date a competition was held to find an artist to create a pair of bronze doors for the Baptistry of St. John, the oldest remaining church in the city. The Baptistry is a large octagonal building in the Romanesque style. The interior of its dome is decorated with an enormous mosaic figure of Christ in Majesty thought to have been designed by Coppo di Marcovaldo. It has three large portals, the central one being filled at that time by a set of doors created by Andrea Pisano eighty years earlier.

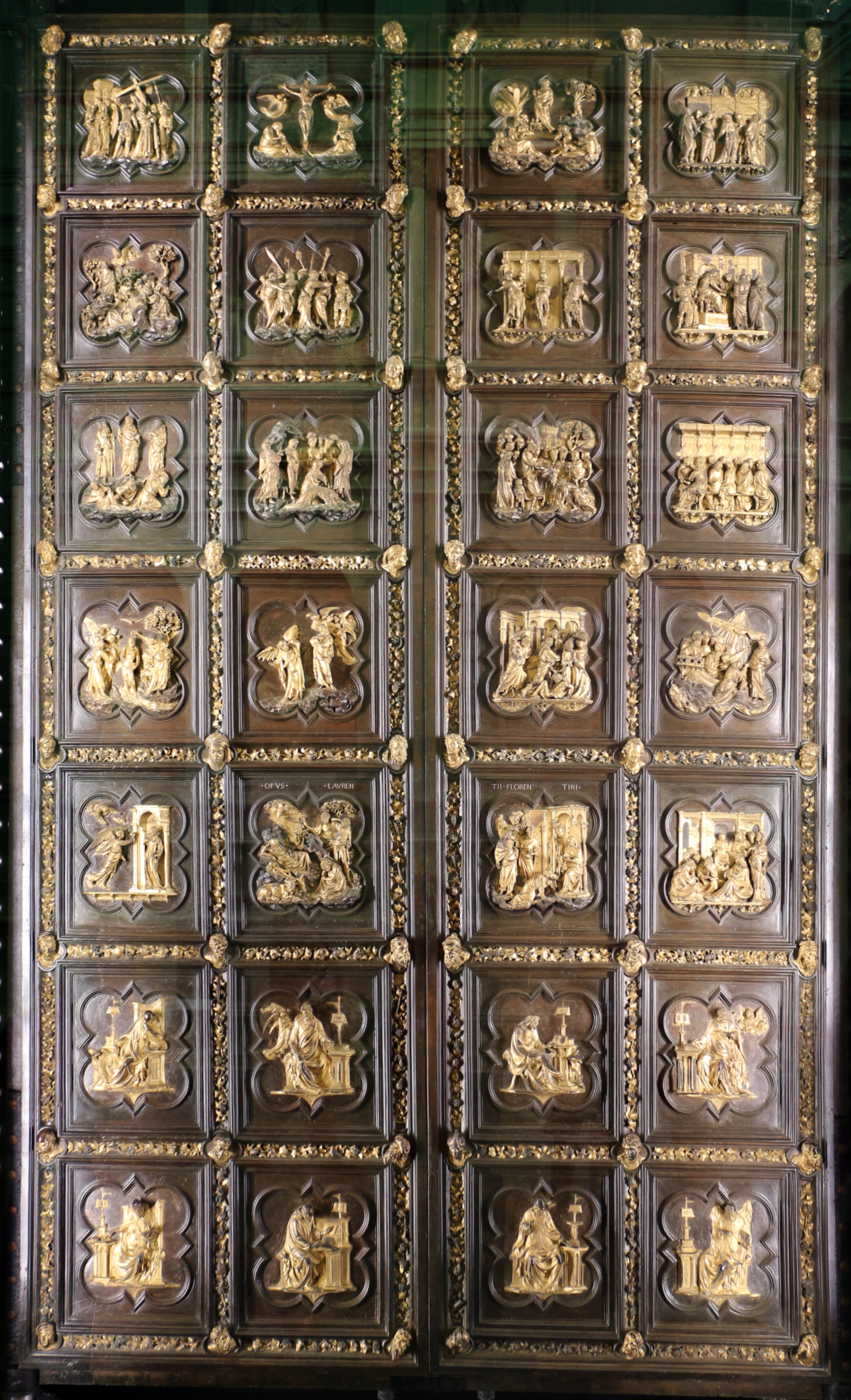
Lorenzo Ghiberti and workshop, North doors of the Baptistery, Museo dell'Opera del Duomo, Florence

Pisano's doors were divided into 28 quatrefoil compartments, containing narrative scenes from the Life of John the Baptist. The competitors, of which there were seven young artists, were each to design a bronze panel of similar shape and size, representing the Sacrifice of Isaac. Two of the panels have survived, that by Lorenzo Ghiberti and that by Brunelleschi. Each panel shows some strongly classicising motifs indicating the direction that art and philosophy were moving, at that time. Ghiberti has used the naked figure of Isaac to create a small sculpture in the Classical style. He kneels on a tomb decorated with acanthus scrolls that are also a reference to the art of Ancient Rome. In Brunelleschi's panel, one of the additional figures included in the scene is reminiscent of a well-known Roman bronze figure of a boy pulling a thorn from his foot. Brunelleschi's creation is challenging in its dynamic intensity. Less elegant than Ghiberti's, it is more about human drama and impending tragedy.

Ghiberti won the competition. His first set of Baptistry doors took 27 years to complete, after which he was commissioned to make another. In the total of 50 years that Ghiberti worked on them, the doors provided a training ground for many of the artists of Florence. Being narrative in subject and employing not only skill in arranging figurative compositions but also the burgeoning skill of linear perspective, the doors were to have an enormous influence on the development of Florentine pictorial art. They were a unifying factor, a source of pride and camaraderie for both the city and its artists. Michelangelo was to call them the Gates of Paradise.

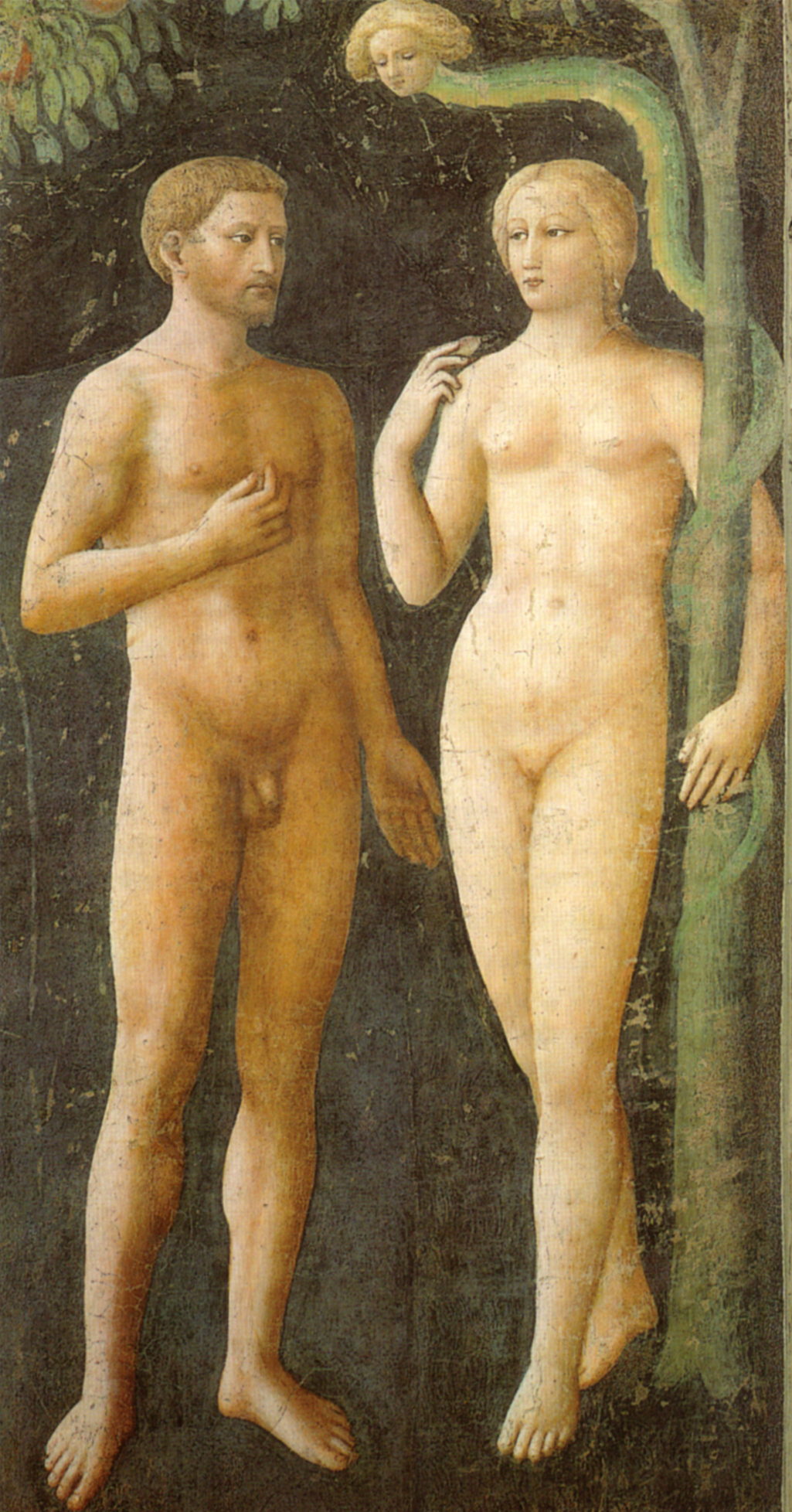
Masolino: Adam and Eve

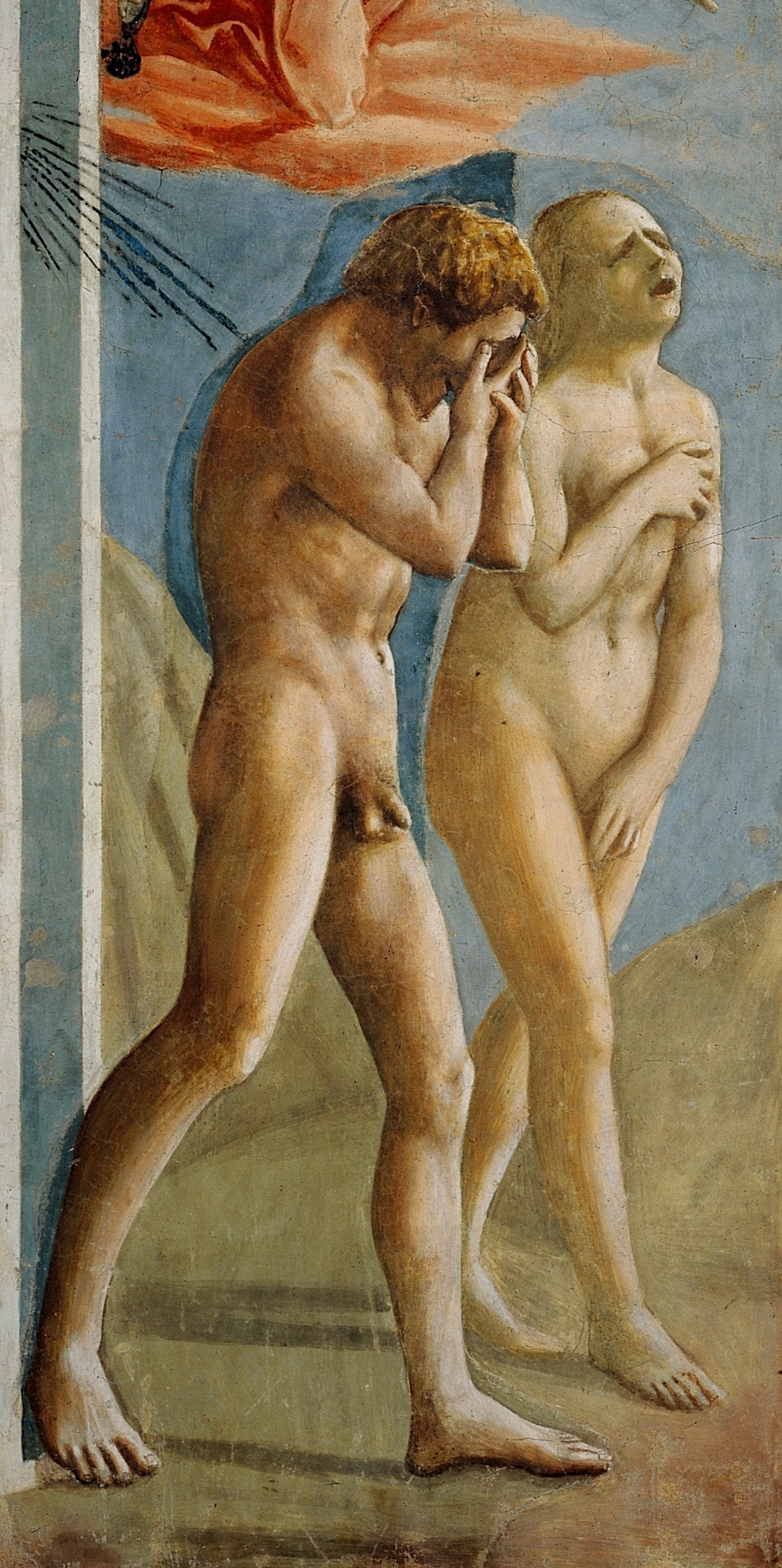
Masaccio: Adam and Eve

=== Brancacci Chapel ===
In 1426 two artists commenced painting a fresco cycle of the Life of St. Peter in the chapel of the Brancacci family, at the Carmelite Church in Florence. They both were called by the name of Tommaso and were nicknamed Masaccio and Masolino, Slovenly Tom and Little Tom.

More than any other artist, Masaccio recognized the implications in the work of Giotto. He carried forward the practice of painting from nature. His paintings demonstrate an understanding of anatomy, of foreshortening, of linear perspective, of light and the study of drapery. Among his works, the figures of Adam and Eve being expelled from Eden, painted on the side of the arch into the chapel, are renowned for their realistic depiction of the human form and of human emotion. They contrast with the gentle and pretty figures painted by Masolino on the opposite side of Adam and Eve receiving the forbidden fruit. The painting of the Brancacci Chapel was left incomplete when Masaccio died at 26. The work was later finished by Filippino Lippi. Masaccio's work became a source of inspiration to many later painters, including Leonardo da Vinci and Michelangelo.

=== Development of linear perspective ===
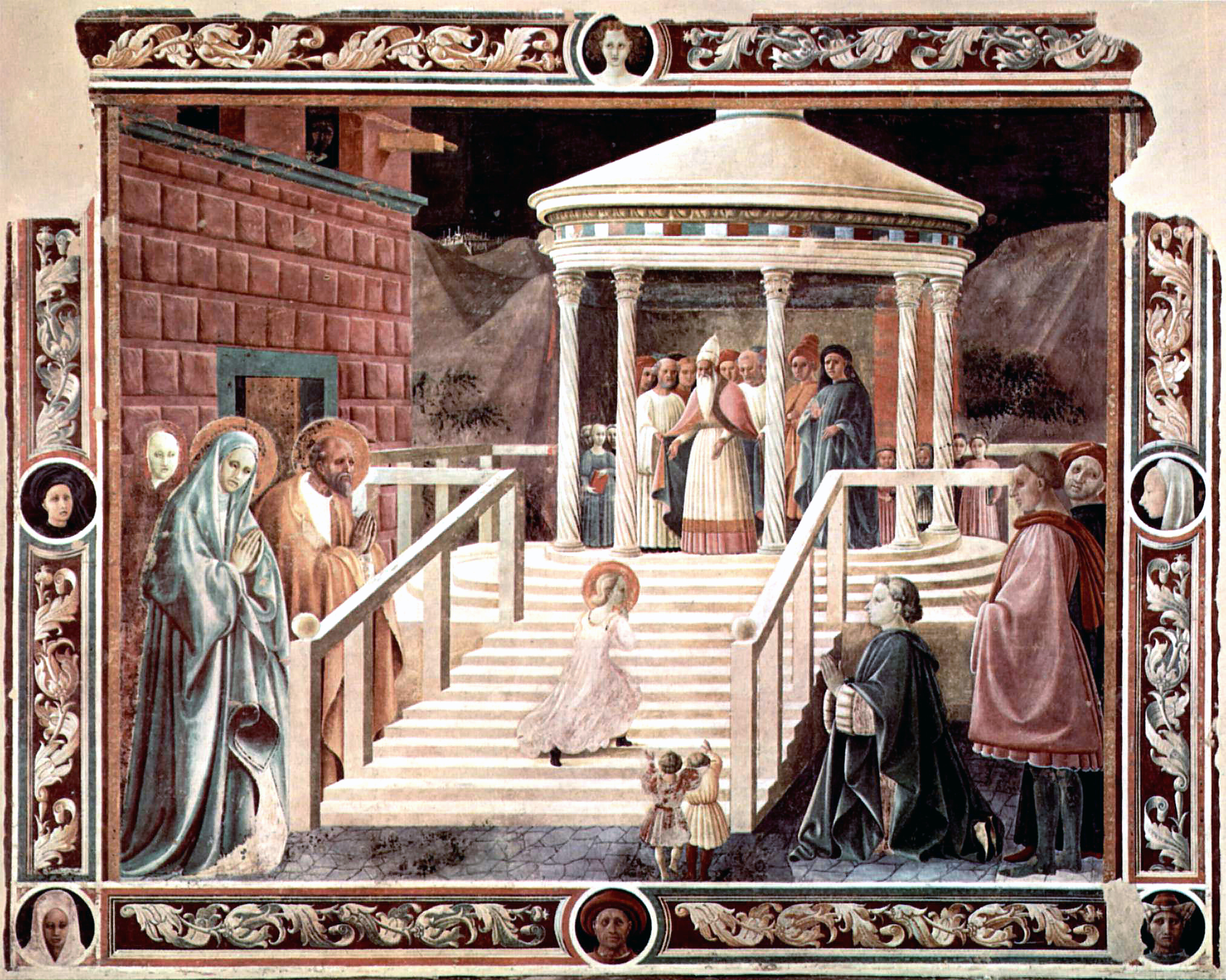
Paolo Uccello: The Presentation of the Virgin shows his experiments with perspective and light.

During the first half of the 15th century, the achieving of the effect of realistic space in a painting by the employment of linear perspective was a major preoccupation of many painters, as well as the architects Brunelleschi and Alberti who both theorised about the subject. Brunelleschi is known to have done a number of careful studies of the piazza and octagonal baptistery outside Florence Cathedral and it is thought he aided Masaccio in the creation of his famous trompe-l'œil niche around the Holy Trinity he painted at Santa Maria Novella.

According to Vasari, Paolo Uccello was so obsessed with perspective that he thought of little else and experimented with it in many paintings, the best known being the three Battle of San Romano pictures which use broken weapons on the ground, and fields on the distant hills to give an impression of perspective.

In the 1450s Piero della Francesca, in paintings such as The Flagellation of Christ, demonstrated his mastery over linear perspective and also over the science of light. Another painting exists, a cityscape, by an unknown artist, perhaps Piero della Francesca, that demonstrates the sort of experiment that Brunelleschi had been making. From this time linear perspective was understood and regularly employed, such as by Perugino in his Christ Giving the Keys to St. Peter in the Sistine Chapel.

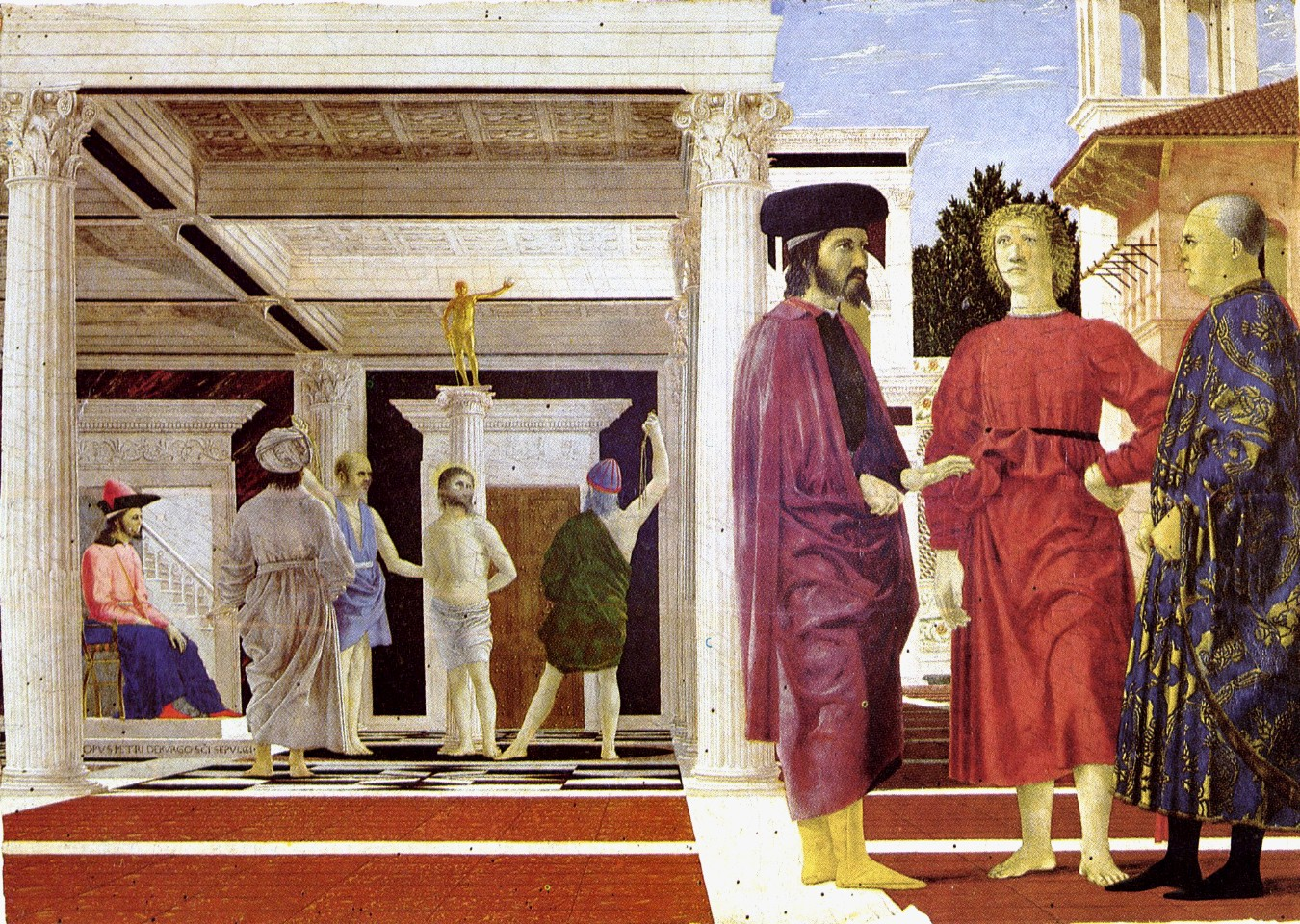
Piero della Francesca: The Flagellation demonstrates the artist's control over both perspective and light.

=== Understanding of light ===
Giotto used tonality to create form. Taddeo Gaddi in his nocturnal scene in the Baroncelli Chapel demonstrated how light could be used to create drama. Paolo Uccello, a hundred years later, experimented with the dramatic effect of light in some of his almost monochrome frescoes. He did a number of these in terra verde or "green earth", enlivening his compositions with touches of vermilion. The best known is his equestrian portrait of John Hawkwood on the wall of Florence Cathedral. Both here and on the four heads of prophets that he painted around the inner clockface in the cathedral, he used strongly contrasting tones, suggesting that each figure was being lit by a natural light source, as if the source was an actual window in the cathedral.

Piero della Francesca carried his study of light further. In the Flagellation he demonstrates a knowledge of how light is proportionally disseminated from its point of origin. There are two sources of light in this painting, one internal to a building and the other external. Of the internal source, though the light itself is invisible, its position can be calculated with mathematical certainty. Leonardo da Vinci was to carry forward Piero's work on light.

=== The Madonna ===
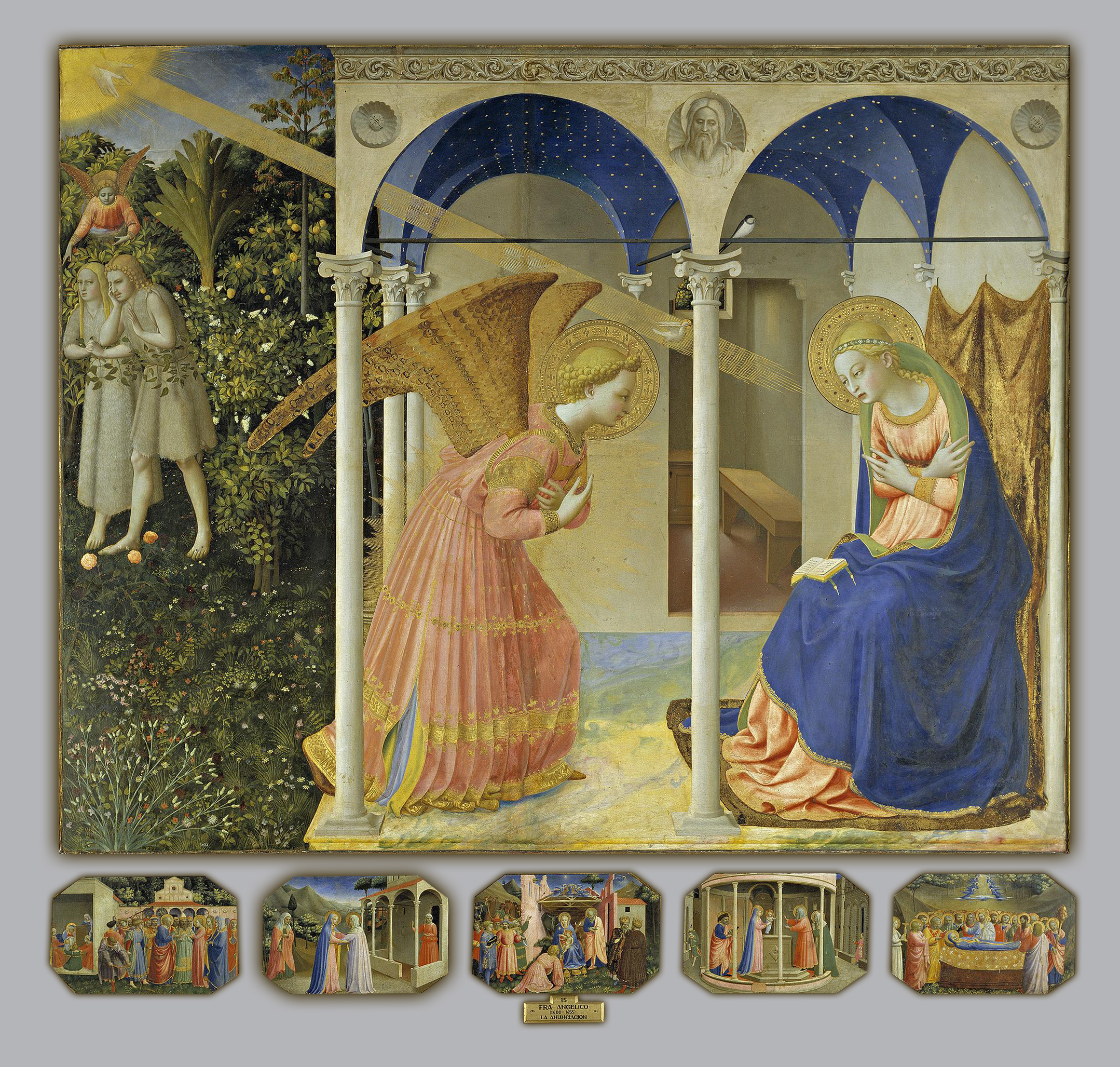
One of several Annunciations by Fra Angelico, Prado

The Blessed Virgin Mary, revered by the Catholic Church worldwide, was particularly evoked in Florence, where there was a miraculous image of her on a column in the corn market and where both the Cathedral of "Our Lady of the Flowers" and the large Dominican church of Santa Maria Novella were named in her honor.

The miraculous image in the corn market was destroyed by fire, but replaced with a new image in the 1330s by Bernardo Daddi, set in an elaborately designed and lavishly wrought canopy by Orcagna. The open lower storey of the building was enclosed and dedicated as Orsanmichele.

Depictions of the Madonna and Child were a very popular art form in Florence. They took every shape from small mass-produced terracotta plaques to magnificent altarpieces such as those by Cimabue, Giotto and Masaccio. Small Madonnas for the home were the bread and butter work of most painting workshops, often largely produced by the junior members following a model by the master. Public buildings and government offices also often contained these or other religious paintings.

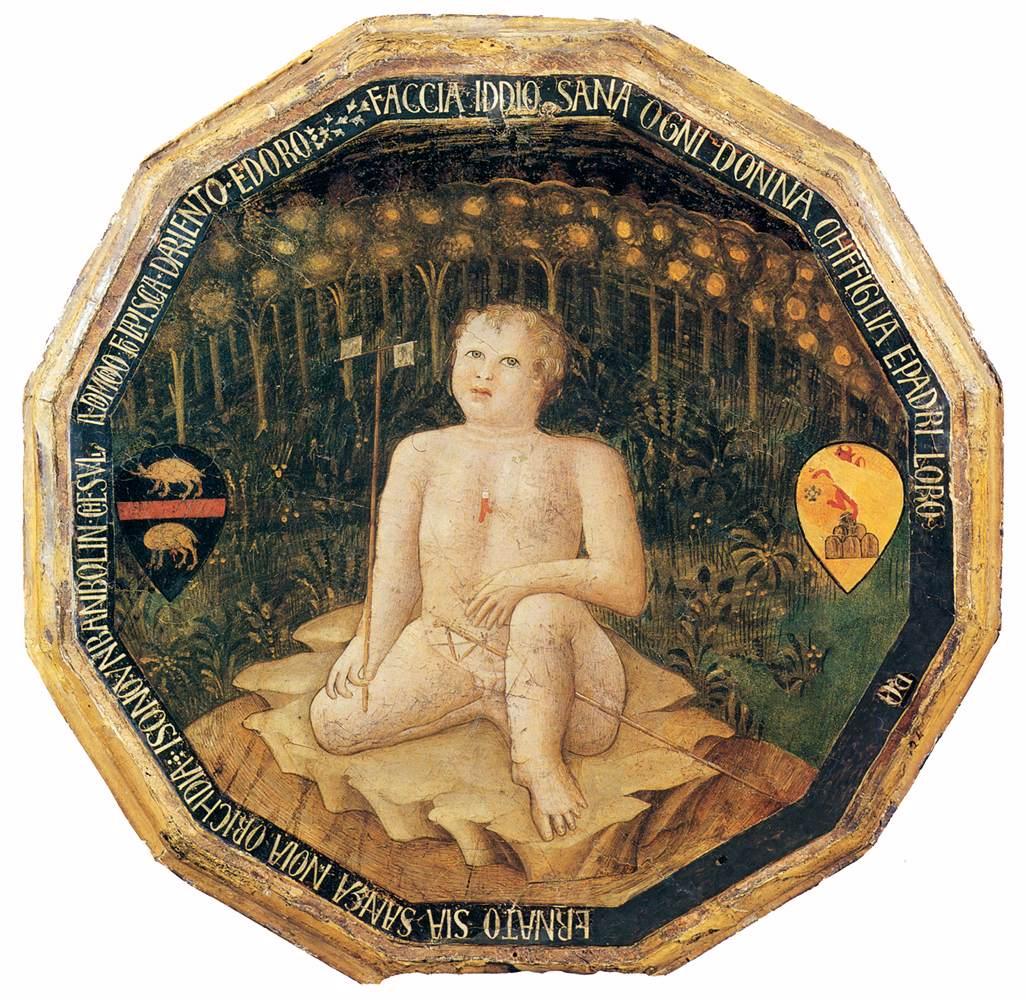
Bartolomeo di Fruosino, 1420, typical verso of a desco da parto, with heraldry and a baby boy urinating

Among those who painted devotional Madonnas during the Early Renaissance are Fra Angelico, Fra Filippo Lippi, Verrocchio and Davide Ghirlandaio. Later the leading purveyor was Botticelli and his workshop who produced large numbers of Madonnas for churches, homes, and also public buildings. He introduced a large round tondo format for grand homes. Perugino's Madonnas and saints are known for their sweetness and a number of small Madonnas attributed to Leonardo da Vinci, such as the Benois Madonna, have survived. Even Michelangelo who was primarily a sculptor, was persuaded to paint the Doni Tondo, while for Raphael, they are among his most popular and numerous works.

=== Birthing-trays ===
A Florentine speciality was the round or 12-sided desco da parto or birthing-tray, on which a new mother served sweetmeats to the female friends who visited her after the birth. The rest of the time these seem to have been hung in the bedroom. Both sides are painted, one with scenes to encourage the mother during the pregnancy, often showing a naked male toddler; viewing positive images was believed to promote the outcome depicted.

=== Painting and printmaking ===
From around the mid-century, Florence became Italy's leading centre of the new industry of printmaking, as some of the many Florentine goldsmiths turned to making plates for engravings. They often copied the style of painters, or drawings supplied by them. Botticelli was one of the first to experiment with drawings for book illustrations, in his case of Dante. Antonio del Pollaiuolo was a goldsmith as well as a printer, and engraved his Battle of the Nude Men himself; in its size and sophistication this took the Italian print to new levels, and remains one of the most famous prints of the Renaissance.

=== Patronage and Humanism ===
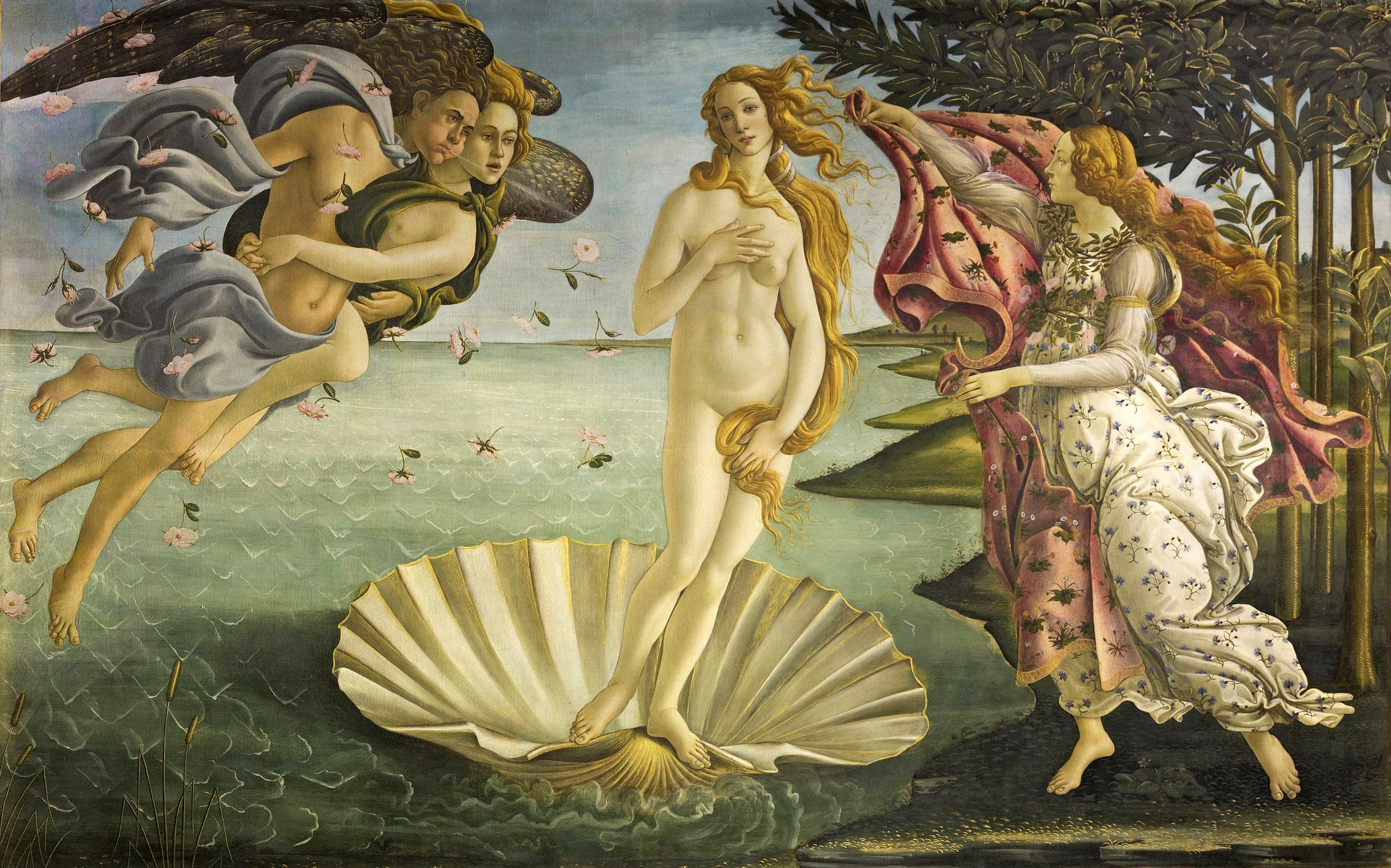
Botticelli: The Birth of Venus for the Medici

In Florence, in the later 15th century, most works of art, even those that were done as decoration for churches, were generally commissioned and paid for by private patrons. Much of the patronage came from the Medici family, or those who were closely associated with or related to them, such as the Sassetti, the Ruccellai and the Tornabuoni.

In the 1460s Cosimo de' Medici the Elder had established Marsilio Ficino as his resident Humanist philosopher, and facilitated his translation of Plato and his teaching of Platonic philosophy, which focused on humanity as the centre of the natural universe, on each person's personal relationship with God, and on fraternal or "platonic" love as being the closest that a person could get to emulating or understanding the love of God.

In the Medieval period, everything related to the Classical period was perceived as associated with paganism. In the Renaissance it came increasingly to be associated with enlightenment. The figures of Classical mythology began to take on a new symbolic role in Christian art and in particular, the Goddess Venus took on a new discretion. Born fully formed, by a sort of miracle, she was the new Eve, symbol of innocent love, or even, by extension, a symbol of the Virgin Mary herself. We see Venus in both these roles in the two famous tempera paintings that Botticelli did in the 1480s for Cosimo's nephew, Pierfrancesco Medici, the Primavera and the Birth of Venus.

Meanwhile, Domenico Ghirlandaio, a meticulous and accurate draughtsman and one of the finest portrait painters of his age, executed two cycles of frescoes for Medici associates in two of Florence's larger churches, the Sassetti Chapel at Santa Trinita and the Tornabuoni Chapel at Santa Maria Novella. In these cycles of the Life of St Francis and the Life of the Virgin Mary and Life of John the Baptist there was room for portraits of patrons and of the patrons' patrons. Thanks to Sassetti's patronage, there is a portrait of the man himself, with his employer, Lorenzo il Magnifico, and Lorenzo's three sons with their tutor, the Humanist poet and philosopher, Agnolo Poliziano. In the Tornabuoni Chapel is another portrait of Poliziano, accompanied by the other influential members of the Platonic Academy including Marsilio Ficino.

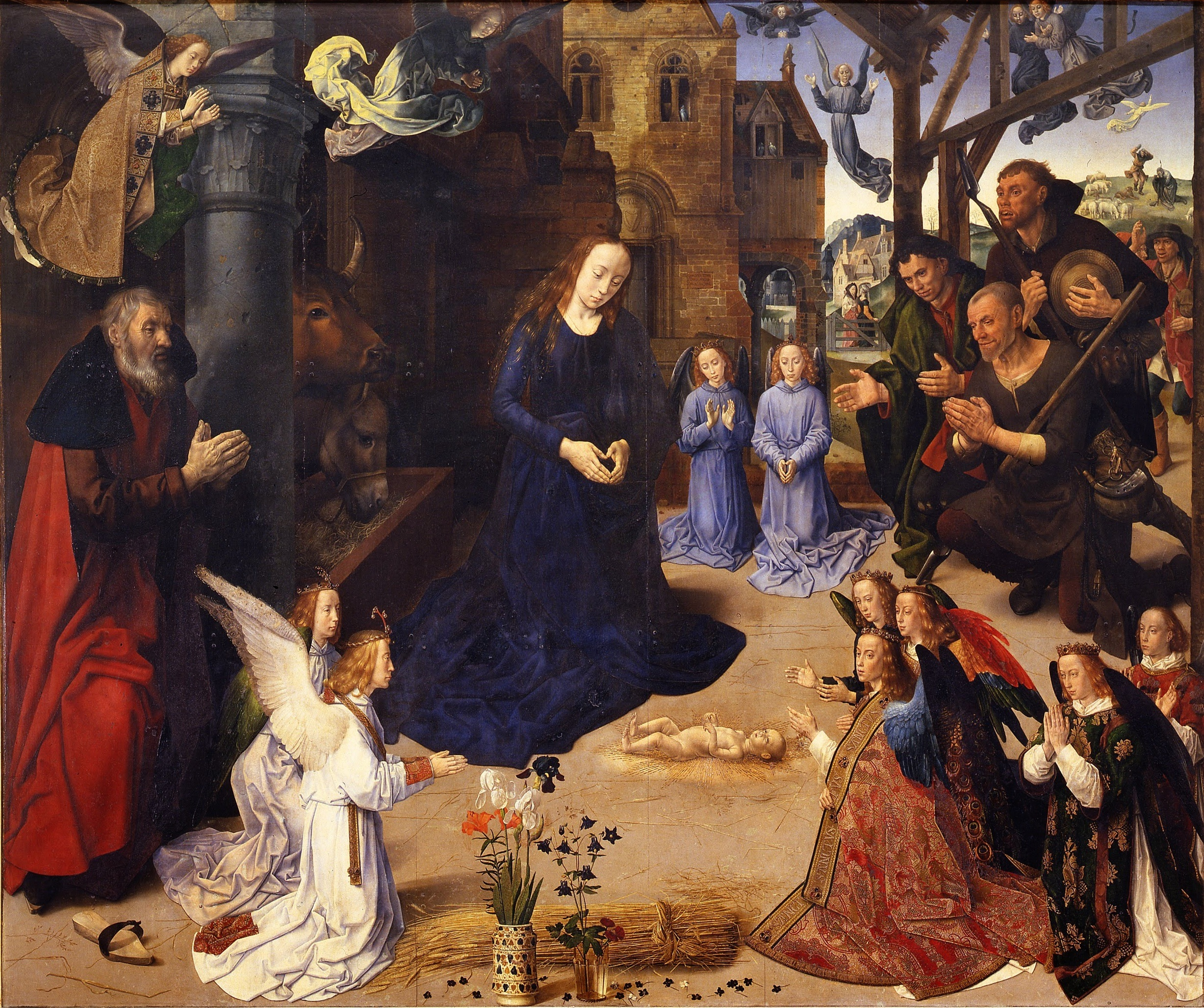
Hugo van der Goes: The Portinari Altarpiece

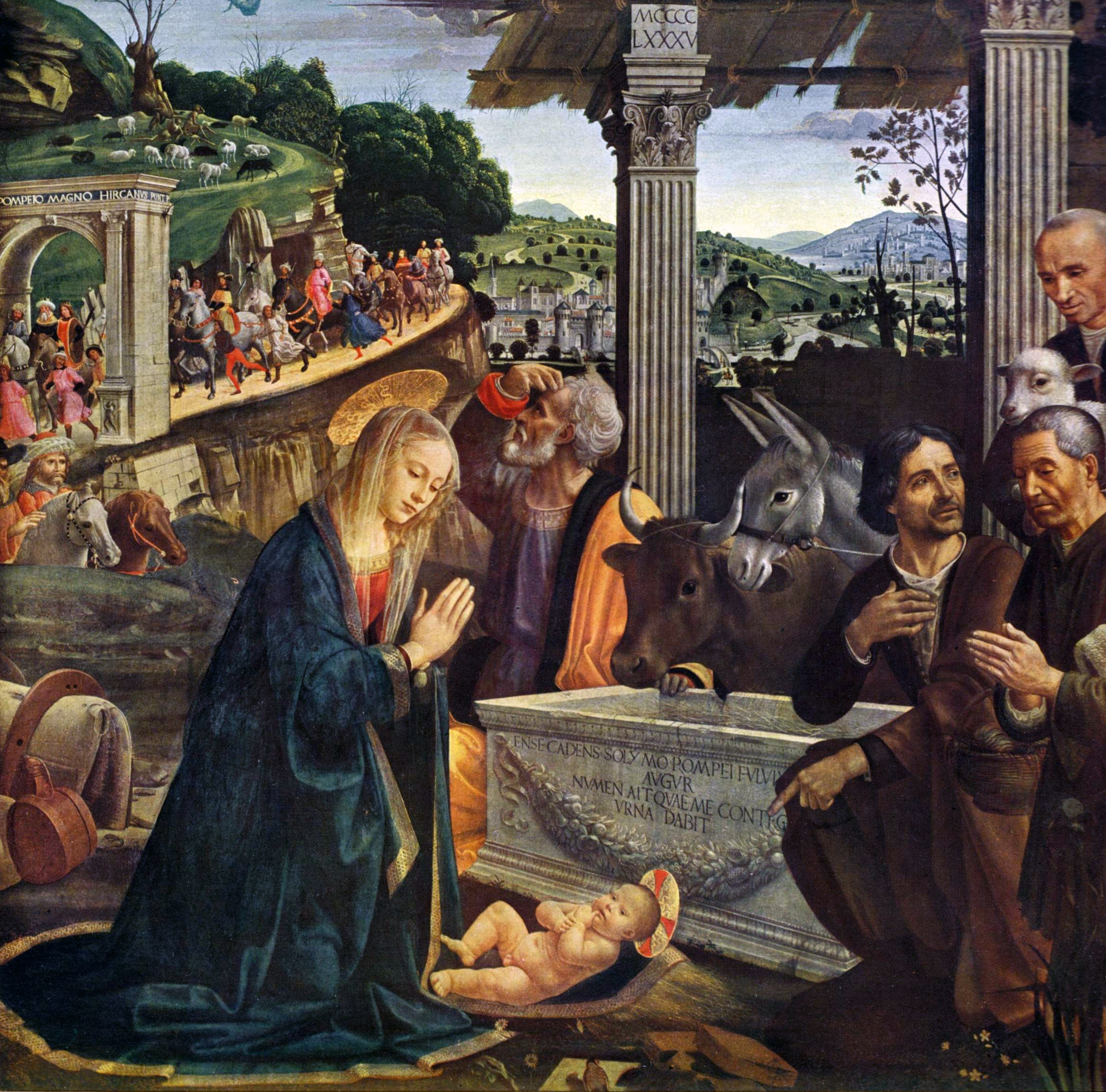
Ghirlandaio: The Sassetti Altarpiece

=== Flemish influence ===
From about 1450, with the arrival in Italy of the Flemish painter Rogier van der Weyden and possibly earlier, artists were introduced to the medium of oil paint. Whereas both tempera and fresco lent themselves to the depiction of pattern, neither presented a successful way to represent natural textures realistically. The highly flexibly medium of oils, which could be made opaque or transparent, and allowed alteration and additions for days after it had been laid down, opened a new world of possibility to Italian artists.

In 1475 a huge altarpiece of the Adoration of the Shepherds arrived in Florence. Painted by Hugo van der Goes at the behest of the Portinari family, it was shipped out from Bruges and installed in the Chapel of Sant' Egidio at the hospital of Santa Maria Nuova. The altarpiece glows with intense reds and greens, contrasting with the glossy black velvet robes of the Portinari donors. In the foreground is a still life of flowers in contrasting containers, one of glazed pottery and the other of glass. The glass vase alone was enough to excite attention. But the most influential aspect of the triptych was the extremely natural and lifelike quality of the three shepherds with stubbly beards, workworn hands and expressions ranging from adoration to wonder to incomprehension. Domenico Ghirlandaio promptly painted his own version, with a beautiful Italian Madonna in place of the long-faced Flemish one, and himself, gesturing theatrically, as one of the shepherds.

=== Papal commission in Rome ===
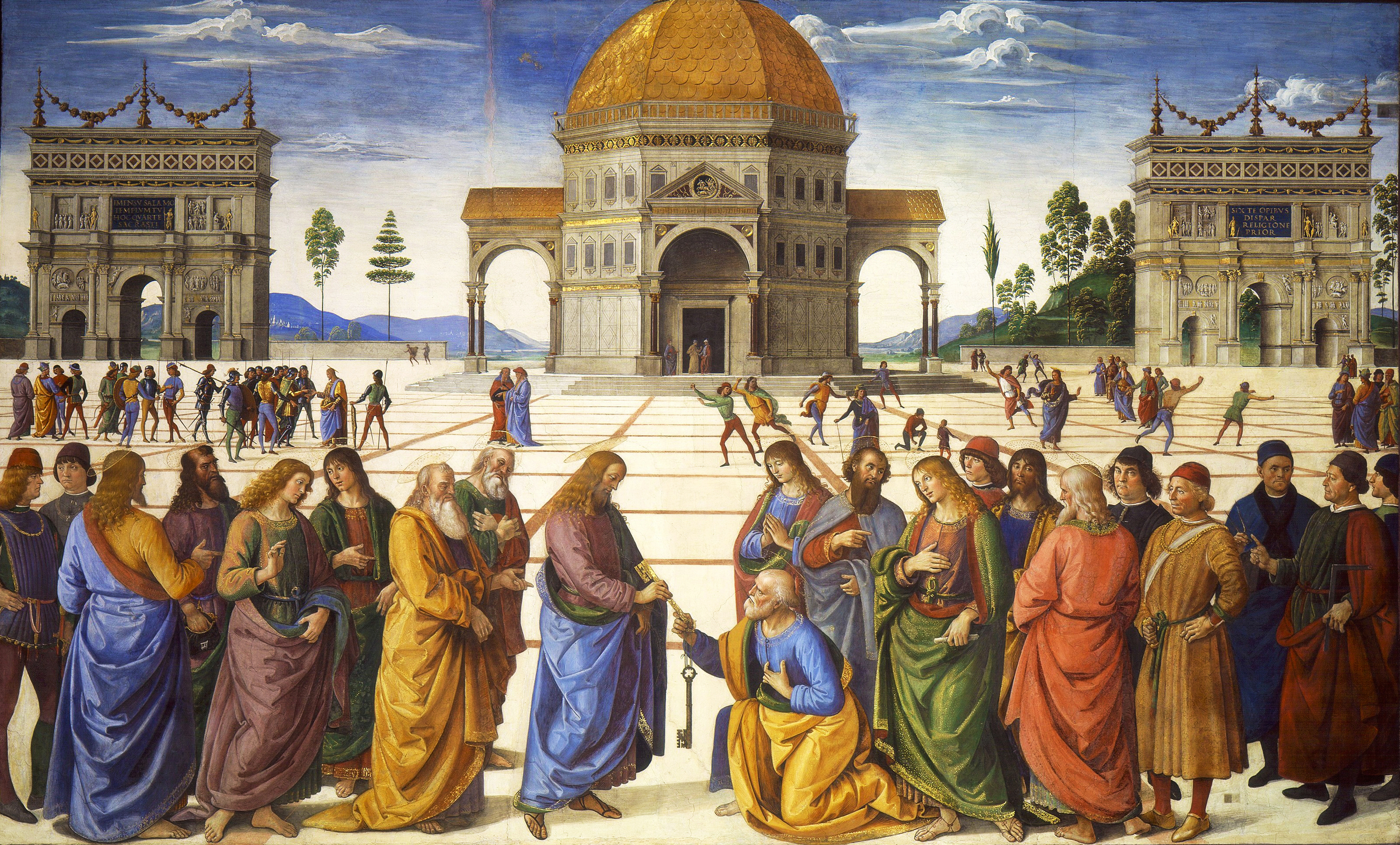
Perugino: Christ Giving the Keys to Peter

In 1477 Pope Sixtus IV replaced the derelict old chapel at the Vatican in which many of the papal services were held. The interior of the new chapel, named the Sistine Chapel in his honour, appears to have been planned from the start to have a series of 16 large frescoes between its pilasters on the middle level, with a series of painted portraits of popes above them.

In 1480, a group of artists from Florence was commissioned with the work: Botticelli, Pietro Perugino, Domenico Ghirlandaio and Cosimo Rosselli. This fresco cycle was to depict Stories of the Life of Moses on one side of the chapel, and Stories of the Life of Christ on the other with the frescoes complementing each other in theme. The Nativity of Jesus and the Finding of Moses were adjacent on the wall behind the altar, with an altarpiece of the Assumption of the Virgin between them. These paintings, all by Perugino, were later destroyed to paint Michelangelo's Last Judgement.

The remaining 12 pictures indicate the virtuosity that these artists had attained, and the obvious cooperation between individuals who normally employed very different styles and skills. The paintings gave full range to their capabilities as they included a great number of figures of men, women and children and characters ranging from guiding angels to enraged Pharaohs and the devil himself. Each painting required a landscape. Because of the scale of the figures that the artists agreed upon, in each picture, the landscape and sky take up the whole upper half of the scene. Sometimes, as in Botticelli's scene of The Purification of the Leper, there are additional small narratives taking place in the landscape, in this case The Temptations of Christ.

Perugino's scene of Christ Giving the Keys to St. Peter is remarkable for the clarity and simplicity of its composition, the beauty of the figurative painting, which includes a self-portrait among the onlookers, and especially the perspective cityscape which includes reference to Peter's ministry to Rome by the presence of two triumphal arches, and centrally placed an octagonal building that might be a Christian baptistry or a Roman Mausoleum.

== High Renaissance ==
Florence was the birthplace of the High Renaissance, but in the early 16th century the most important artists were attracted to Rome, where the largest commissions began to be. In part this was following the Medici, some of whom became cardinals and even the pope.

=== Leonardo da Vinci ===
Leonardo, because of the scope of his interests and the degree of talent that he demonstrated in so many diverse areas, is regarded as the archetypal "Renaissance man". But it was first and foremost as a painter that he was admired within his own time, and as a painter, he drew on the knowledge that he gained from all his other interests. Leonardo was a scientific observer. He learned by looking at things. He studied and drew the flowers of the fields, the eddies of the river, the form of the rocks and mountains, the way light reflected from foliage and sparkled in a jewel. In particular, he studied the human form, dissecting thirty or more unclaimed cadavers from a hospital in order to understand muscles and sinews.

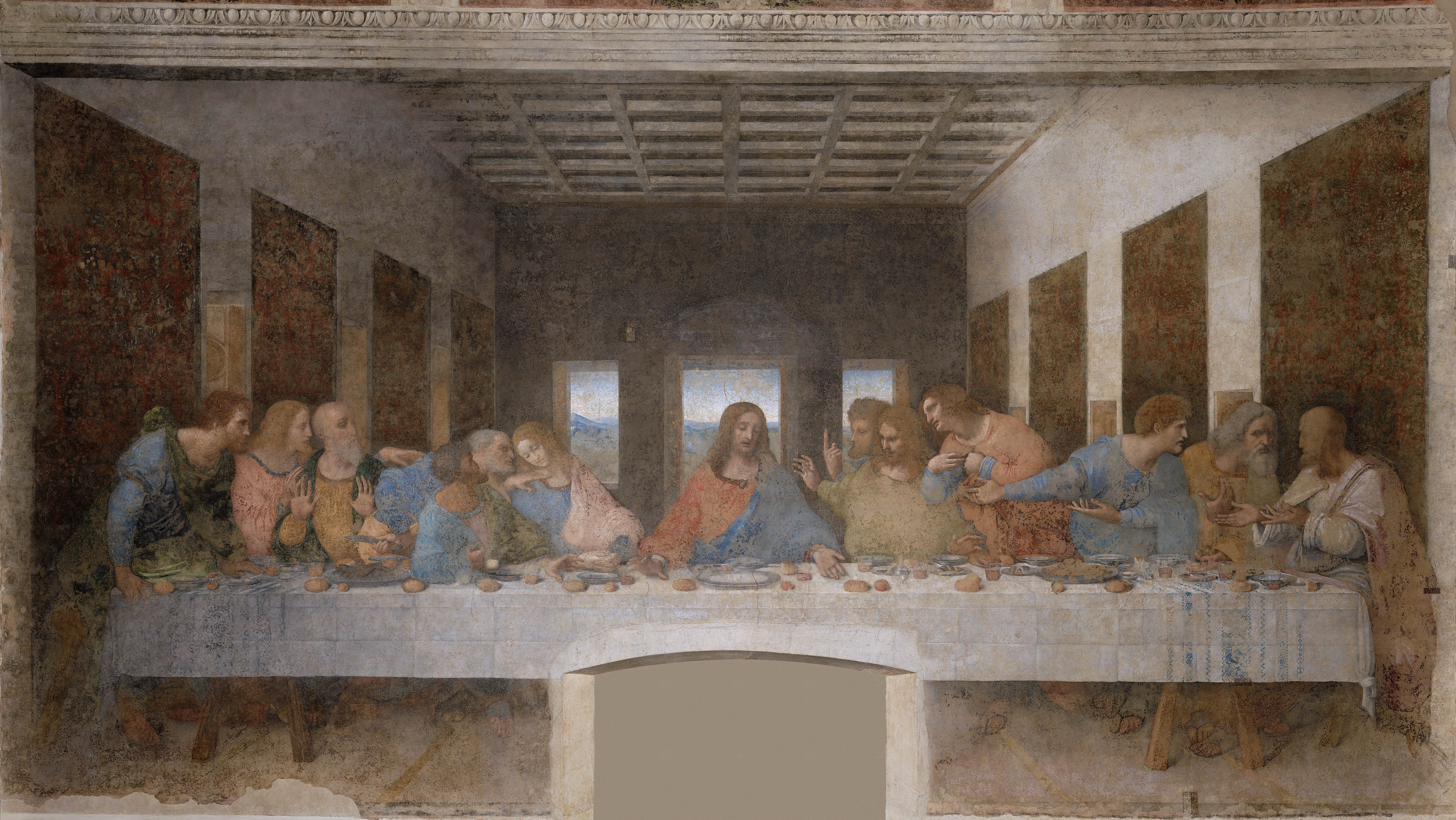
Leonardo da Vinci: The Last Supper

More than any other artist, he advanced the study of "atmosphere". In his paintings such as the Mona Lisa and Virgin of the Rocks, he used light and shade with such subtlety that, for want of a better word, it became known as Leonardo's "sfumato" or "smoke".

Simultaneous to inviting the viewer into a mysterious world of shifting shadows, chaotic mountains and whirling torrents, Leonardo achieved a degree of realism in the expression of human emotion, prefigured by Giotto but unknown since Masaccio's Adam and Eve. Leonardo's Last Supper, painted in the refectory of a monastery in Milan, became the benchmark for religious narrative painting for the next half millennium. Many other Renaissance artists painted versions of the Last Supper, but only Leonardo's was destined to be reproduced countless times in wood, alabaster, plaster, lithograph, tapestry, crochet and table-carpets.

Apart from the direct impact of the works themselves, Leonardo's studies of light, anatomy, landscape, and human expression were disseminated in part through his generosity to a retinue of students.

=== Michelangelo ===
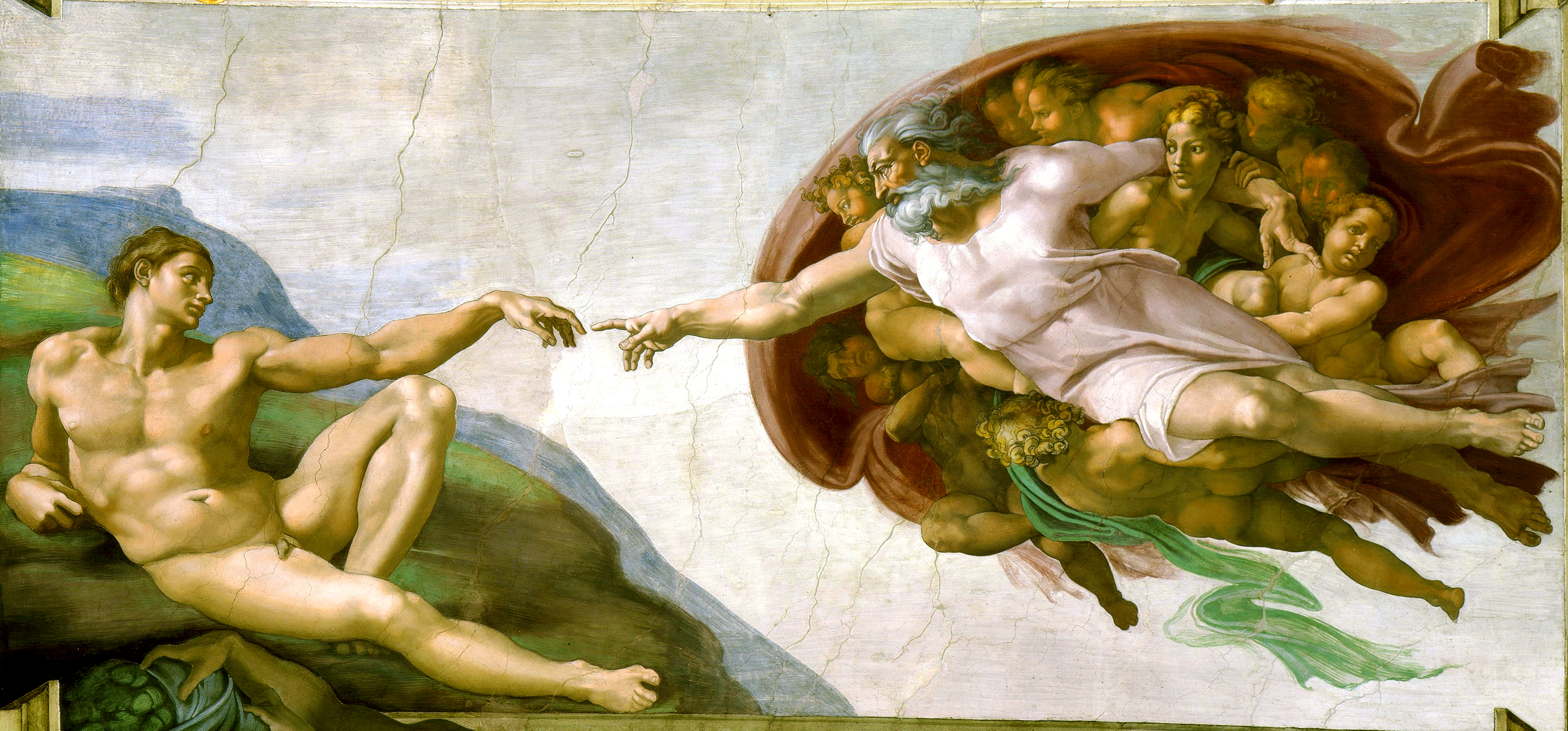
Michelangelo: The Creation of Adam

In 1508 Pope Julius II succeeded in getting the sculptor Michelangelo to agree to continue the decorative scheme of the Sistine Chapel. The Sistine Chapel ceiling was constructed in such a way that there were twelve sloping pendentives supporting the vault that formed ideal surfaces on which to paint the Twelve Apostles. Michelangelo, who had yielded to the Pope's demands with little grace, soon devised an entirely different scheme, far more complex both in design and in iconography. The scale of the work, which he executed single handed except for manual assistance, was titanic and took nearly five years to complete.

The Pope's plan for the Apostles would thematically have formed a pictorial link between the Old Testament and New Testament narratives on the walls, and the popes in the gallery of portraits. It is the twelve apostles, and their leader Peter as first Bishop of Rome, that make that bridge. But Michelangelo's scheme went the opposite direction. The theme of Michelangelo's ceiling is not God's grand plan for humanity's salvation. The theme is about humanity's disgrace. It is about why humanity and the faith needed Jesus.

Superficially, the ceiling is a Humanist construction. The figures are of superhuman dimension and, in the case of Adam, of such beauty that according to the biographer Vasari, it really looks as if God himself had designed the figure, rather than Michelangelo. But despite the beauty of the individual figures, Michelangelo has not glorified the human state, and he certainly has not presented the Humanist ideal of platonic love. In fact, the ancestors of Christ, which he painted around the upper section of the wall, demonstrate all the worst aspects of family relationships, displaying dysfunction in as many different forms as there are families.

Vasari praised Michelangelo's seemingly infinite powers of invention in creating postures for the figures. Raphael, who was given a preview by Bramante after Michelangelo had downed his brush and stormed off to Bologna in a temper, painted at least two figures in imitation of Michelangelo's prophets, one at the church of Sant' Agostino and the other in the Vatican, his portrait of Michelangelo himself in The School of Athens.

=== Raphael ===
With Leonardo da Vinci and Michelangelo, Raphael's name is synonymous with the High Renaissance, although he was younger than Michelangelo by 18 years and Leonardo by almost 30. It cannot be said of him that he greatly advanced the state of painting as his two famous contemporaries did. Rather, his work was the culmination of all the developments of the High Renaissance.

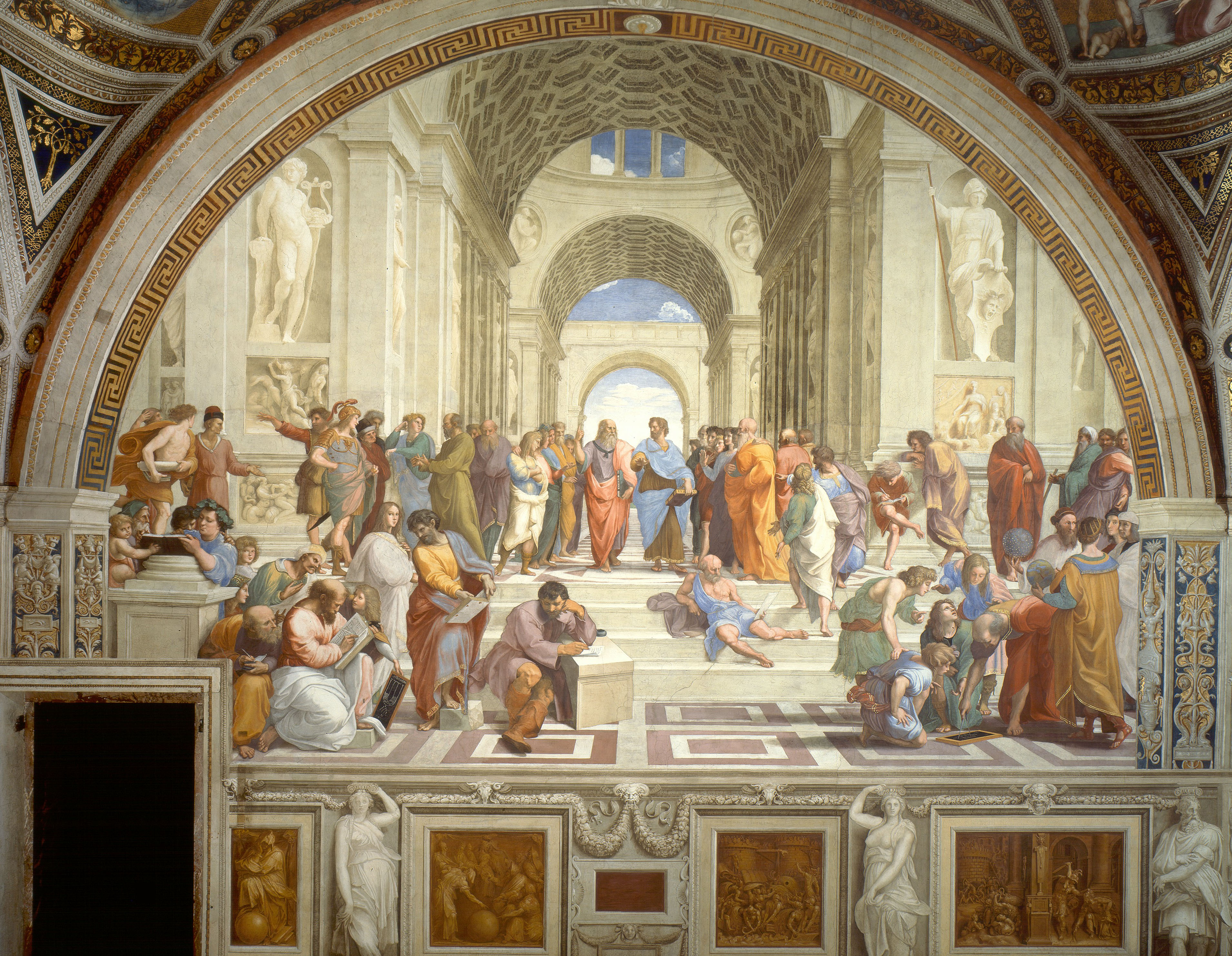
Raphael: The School of Athens, commissioned by Pope Julius II to decorate a suite now known as the Raphael Rooms in the Vatican

Raphael had the good luck to be born the son of a painter, so his career path, unlike that of Michelangelo who was the son of minor nobility, was decided without a quarrel. Some years after his father's death he worked in the Umbrian workshop of Perugino, an excellent painter and a superb technician. His first signed and dated painting, executed at the age of 21, is the Betrothal of the Virgin, which immediately reveals its origins in Perugino's Christ giving the Keys to Peter.

Raphael was a carefree character who unashamedly drew on the skills of the renowned painters whose lifespans encompassed his. In his works the individual qualities of numerous different painters are drawn together. The rounded forms and luminous colours of Perugino, the lifelike portraiture of Ghirlandaio, the realism and lighting of Leonardo and the powerful draughtsmanship of Michelangelo became unified in the paintings of Raphael. In his short life he executed a number of large altarpieces, an impressive Classical fresco of the sea nymph, Galatea, outstanding portraits with two popes and a famous writer among them, and, while Michelangelo was painting the Sistine Chapel ceiling, a series of wall frescoes in the Vatican chambers nearby, of which the School of Athens is uniquely significant.

This fresco depicts a meeting of all the most learned ancient Athenians, gathered in a grand classical setting around the central figure of Plato, whom Raphael has famously modelled upon Leonardo da Vinci. The brooding figure of Heraclitus who sits by a large block of stone, is a portrait of Michelangelo, and is a reference to the latter's painting of the Prophet Jeremiah in the Sistine Chapel. His own portrait is to the right, beside his teacher, Perugino.

But the main source of Raphael's popularity was not his major works, but his small Florentine pictures of the Madonna and Christ Child. Over and over he painted the same plump calm-faced blonde woman and her succession of chubby babies, the most famous probably being La Belle Jardinière ("The Madonna of the Beautiful Garden"), now in the Louvre. His larger work, the Sistine Madonna, used as a design for countless stained glass windows, has come, in the 21st century, to provide the iconic image of two small cherubs which has been reproduced on everything from paper table napkins to umbrellas.

== Early Mannerism ==
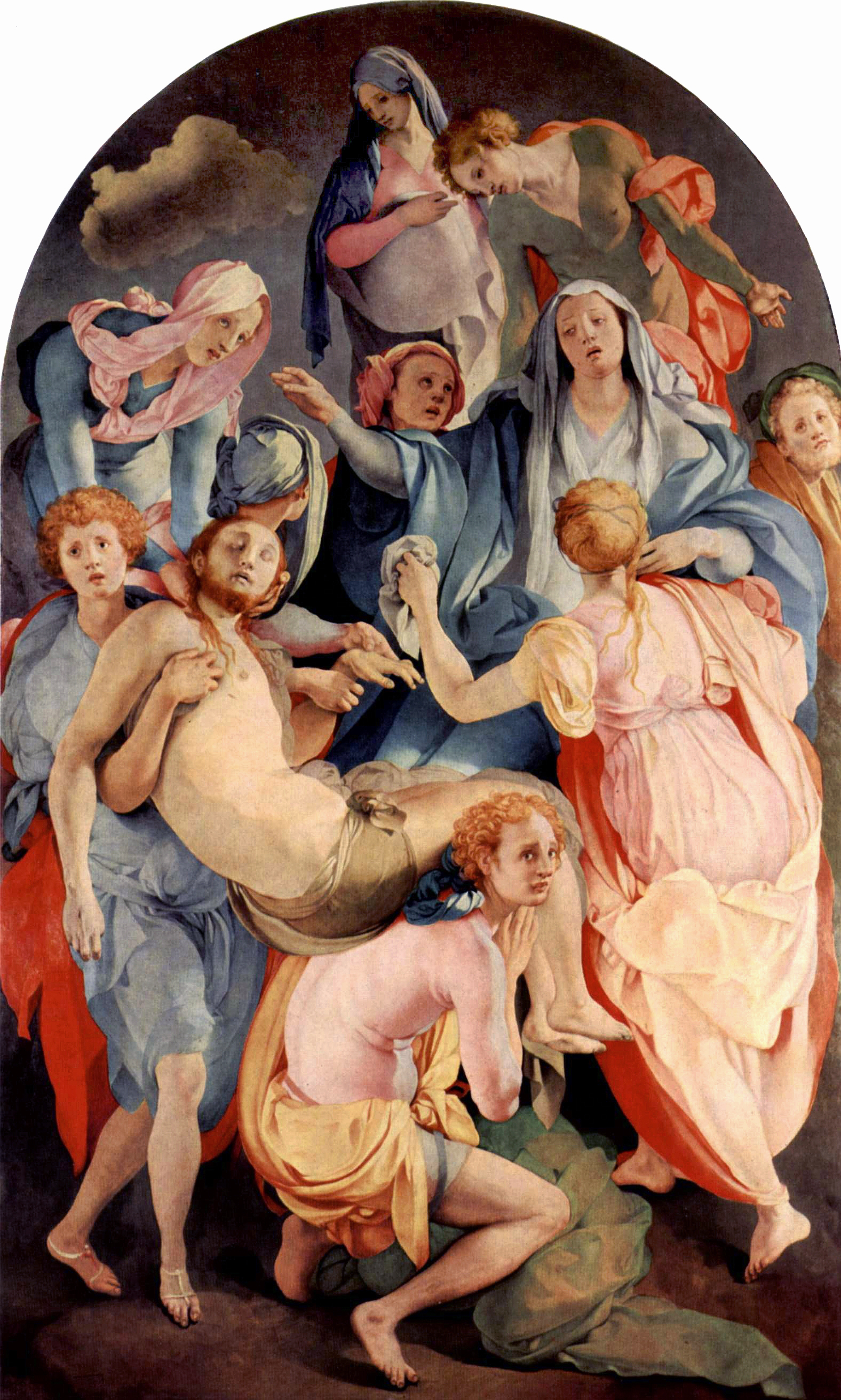
Jacopo Pontormo, Entombment, 1528; Santa Felicità, Florence

The early Mannerists in Florence, especially the students of Andrea del Sarto such as Jacopo da Pontormo and Rosso Fiorentino, are notable for elongated forms, precariously balanced poses, a collapsed perspective, irrational settings, and theatrical lighting. As the leader of the First School of Fontainebleau, Rosso was a major force in the introduction of Renaissance style to France.

Parmigianino (a student of Correggio) and Giulio Romano (Raphael's head assistant) were moving in similarly stylized aesthetic directions in Rome. These artists had matured under the influence of the High Renaissance, and their style has been characterized as a reaction to or exaggerated extension of it. Instead of studying nature directly, younger artists began studying Hellenistic sculpture and paintings of masters past. Therefore, this style was described by art historian Walter Friedländer as "anti-classical”, yet at the time it was considered a natural progression from the High Renaissance. The earliest experimental phase of Mannerism, known for its "anti-classical" forms, lasted until about 1540 or 1550. Marcia B. Hall, professor of art history at Temple University, notes in her book After Raphael that Raphael's premature death marked the beginning of Mannerism in Rome.

== Later Mannerism ==
Bronzino (d.1572), a pupil of Pontormo, was mostly a court portraitist for the Medici court, in a somewhat frigid formal Mannerist style. In the same generation, Giorgio Vasari (d. 1574) is far better remembered as the author of the Lives of the Most Excellent Painters, Sculptors, and Architects, which had an enormous and lasting effect in establishing the reputation of the Florentine School. But he was the leading painter of history painting in the Medici court, although his work is now generally seen as straining after the impact that Michelangelo's work has, and failing to achieve it. This had become a common fault in Florentine painting by the decades after 1530, as many painters tried to emulate the giants of the High Renaissance.

== Baroque ==
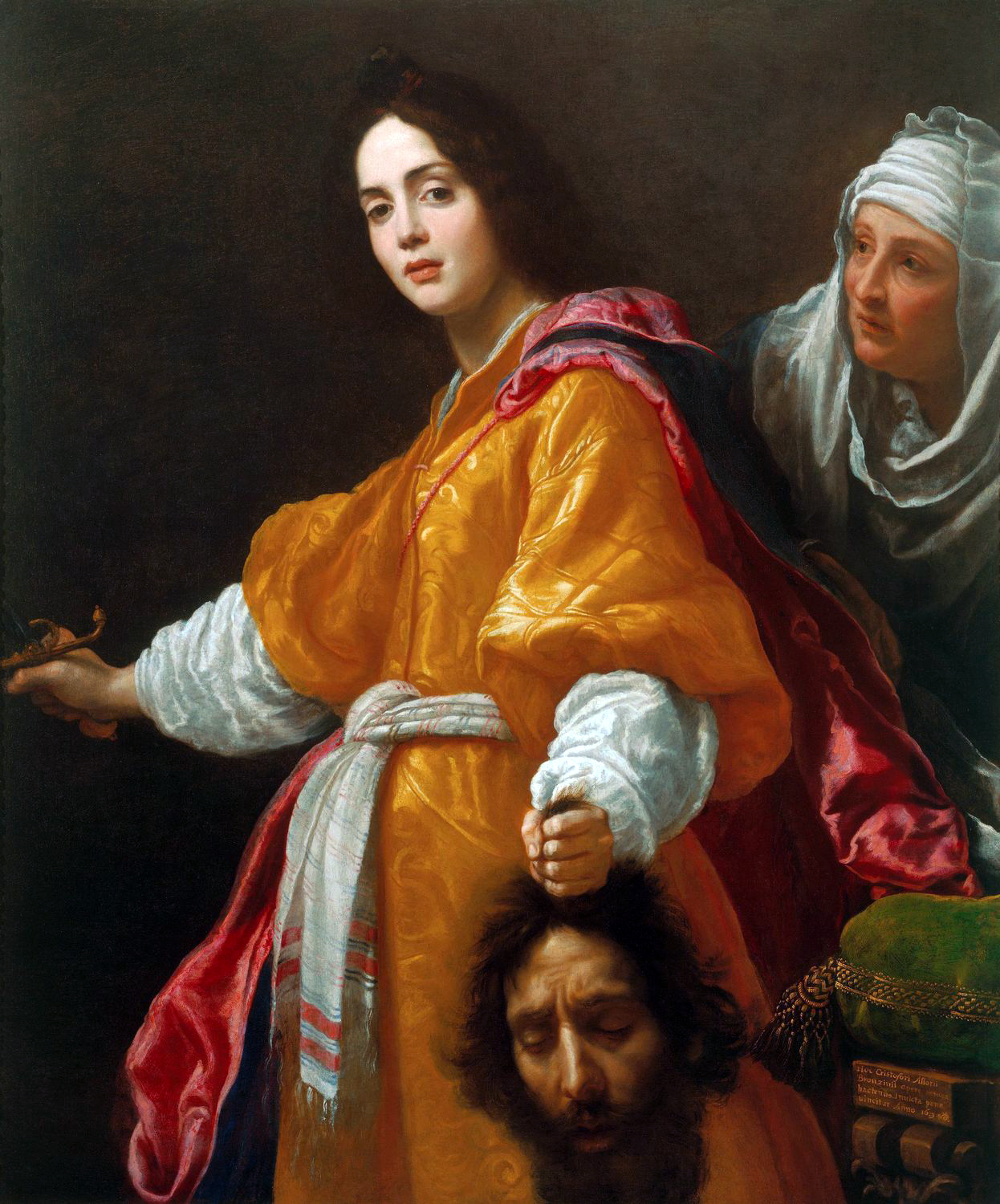
Cristofano Allori, Judith with the Head of Holofernes, 1613, Royal Collection version

By the Baroque period, Florence was no longer the most important centre of painting in Italy, but was important nonetheless. Leading artists born in the city, and who, unlike others, spent much of their careers there, include Cristofano Allori, Matteo Rosselli, Francesco Furini, and Carlo Dolci. Pietro da Cortona was born in the Grand Duchy of Tuscany and did much work in the city.

== See also ==
- Venetian school
- Bolognese School
- Lucchese School
- School of Ferrara
- Sienese School
- Renaissance in Emilia
