= Annibale Gatti =

Italian painter (1828–1909)

Annibale Gatti (September 1828 – 1909) was an Italian painter, known for history painting and fresco decoration in Tuscany.

== Biography ==
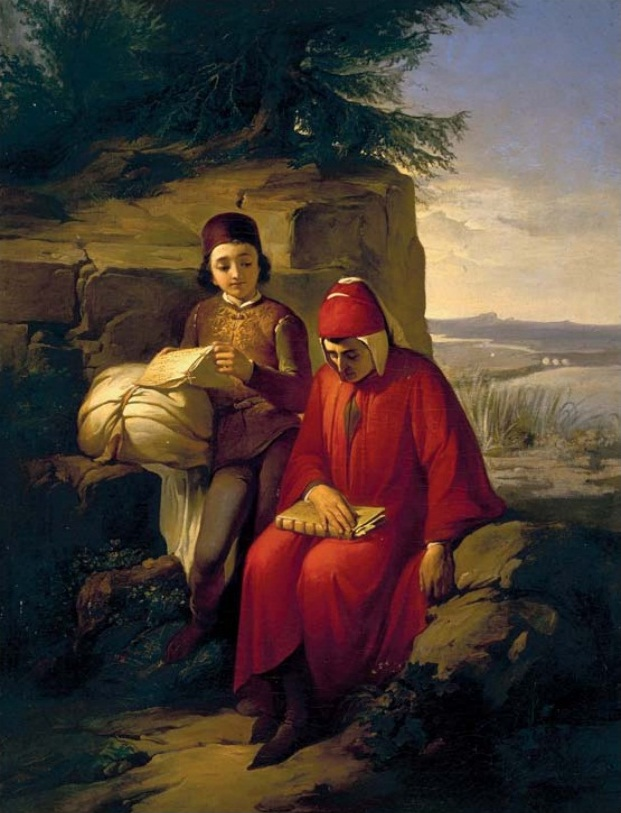
Dante in esilio (Dante in exile) by Annibale Gatti (current location: Galleria d'Arte Moderna (Florence)

He was born in September 1828, in Forlì. He moved to Florence by 1830. In 1843, he enrolled in the Academy of Fine Arts of Florence. He became friends with the architect Giuseppe Poggi, and was employed in numerous restoration projects in Tuscany. He frescoed for the Palazzo Lanfranchi-Toscanelli in Pisa. In 1861, he decorated the Throne Room in the Pitti Palace. He decorated the ceiling of the Teatro Verdi in Pisa, where he also painted the sipario (or theatre curtain). He became professor in the Florentine Academy and appointed Knight of the Order of the Crown of Italy. He died in 1909, aged 80 or 81.

Among his other works are the following:

- Rinaldo and Armida and Armida coi duci arabi, (ceiling of Palazzo Favard, Florence)
- Molière reads his comedies to the serva
- Transport of the Cadaver of Verdiana da Castelfiorentino, (1872) Gold medal in Florence)
- Lafayette and Washington (awarded in Boston)
- Leonardo da Vinci at the court of Lodovico il Moro
- Goldoni his comedies in Gardens of the Palazzo Scotto in Pisa
- Galileo receives Milton (Wellcome Library)
- Paesiello
- The Master of All Our Seeing
- Frieze (Ballroom of Villino Stibbert, Florence).
