= Verzocchi collection =

The Verzocchi collection or the Galleria Verzocchi - work in contemporary painting is a collection of over seventy 20th-century Italian paintings formed by the entrepreneur Giuseppe Verzocchi from 1949 to 1950. It contains only paintings of 90 by 70 cm and only on the themes of work and self-portraiture. Each painting is marked "V & D", the Verzocchi brand. It now forms part of the Pinacoteca civica di Forlì.

== Artists and works ==
- Afro, Tenaglia e camera oscura
- Amerigo Bartoli Natinguerra, L'impiegato
- Luigi Bartolini, Le mietitrici
- Aldo Bergamini, Pittrice di ceramiche
- Ugo Bernasconi, Vangatori
- Renato Birolli, Il porto di Nantes
- Marcello Boccacci, La stiratrice
- Leonardo Borgese, Indossatrici
- Pompeo Borra, Compagni di lavoro
- Giovanni Brancaccio, Pescatori di fondo
- Gastone Breddo, Il ciabattino
- Anselmo Bucci, Il ponte sul Metauro
- Guido Cadorin, Pittori di barche
- Corrado Cagli, Il vasaio
- Massimo Campigli, L'architrave
- Domenico Cantatore, Cucitrice
- Giuseppe Capogrossi, Lavoro
- Felice Carena, Lo scultore
- Aldo Carpi, Studio del pittore
- Carlo Carrà, Costruttori
- Felice Casorati, Mani, oggetti, testa...
- Bruno Cassinari, Pescatori del porto di Antibes
- Primo Conti, Giardiniere
- Antonio Corpora, I lavoratori del mare
- Giorgio de Chirico, Forgia di Vulcano
- Raffaele De Grada, Massaie al lavoro
- Fortunato Depero, Tornio e telaio
- Filippo De Pisis, Piccolo fabbro
- Francesco De Rocchi, Semina di primavera
- Antonio Donghi, Carico di fascine
- Cesare Fratino, La pressa idraulica
- Achille Funi, Lo scultore
- Bepi Galletti, Allieve di pittura
- Luciano Gaspari, Merlettaia di Burano
- Romano Gazzera, I pionieri
- Virgilio Guidi, Il lavoro del metallo
- Renato Guttuso, Bracciante siciliano
- Mino Maccari, Scuola di pittura
- Mario Mafai, Gli scaricatori di carbone
- Concetto Maugeri, Ricostruzione
- Francesco Menzio, Nello studio
- Giuseppe Migneco, Contadino che zappa
- Cesare Monti, Ai campi
- Enzo Morelli, La strada nuova
- Mattia Moreni, La fucina
- Ennio Morlotti, Riparatrici di reti
- Marco Novati, "El remer" (Il fabbricante di remi)
- Giuseppe Novello, Ricamatrice
- Cipriano Efisio Oppo, La fiorista
- Carlo Parmeggiani, Il santo lavoro
- Fausto Pirandello, I vangatori
- Armando Pizzinato, I costruttori di forni
- Enrico Prampolini, Il lavoro del tempo (Ritmi geologici)
- Ottone Rosai, I muratori
- Bruno Saetti, La mondina
- Alberto Salietti, La vendemmia
- Aldo Salvadori, La modella
- Giuseppe Santomaso, Piccola vetreria
- Aligi Sassu, Il campo arato
- Pio Semeghini, Piccola merlettaia
- Gino Severini, Simboli del lavoro
- Mario Sironi, Il lavoro
- Ardengo Soffici, La vangatura
- Orfeo Tamburi, La fornace
- Fiorenzo Tomea, Il raccolto dell'orzo
- Arturo Tosi, Terre arate
- Giulio Turcato, Gli scaricatori
- Gianni Vagnetti, Il lavoro del pittore
- Italo Valenti, Le locomotive
- Emilio Vedova, Interno di fabbrica
- Mario Vellani Marchi, Piccole merlettaie buranelle
- Umberto Vittorini, Donna che lavora
