= MAGI '900- Museum of Artistic and Historical Excellence =

Coordinates: 44.7105°N 11.3028°E

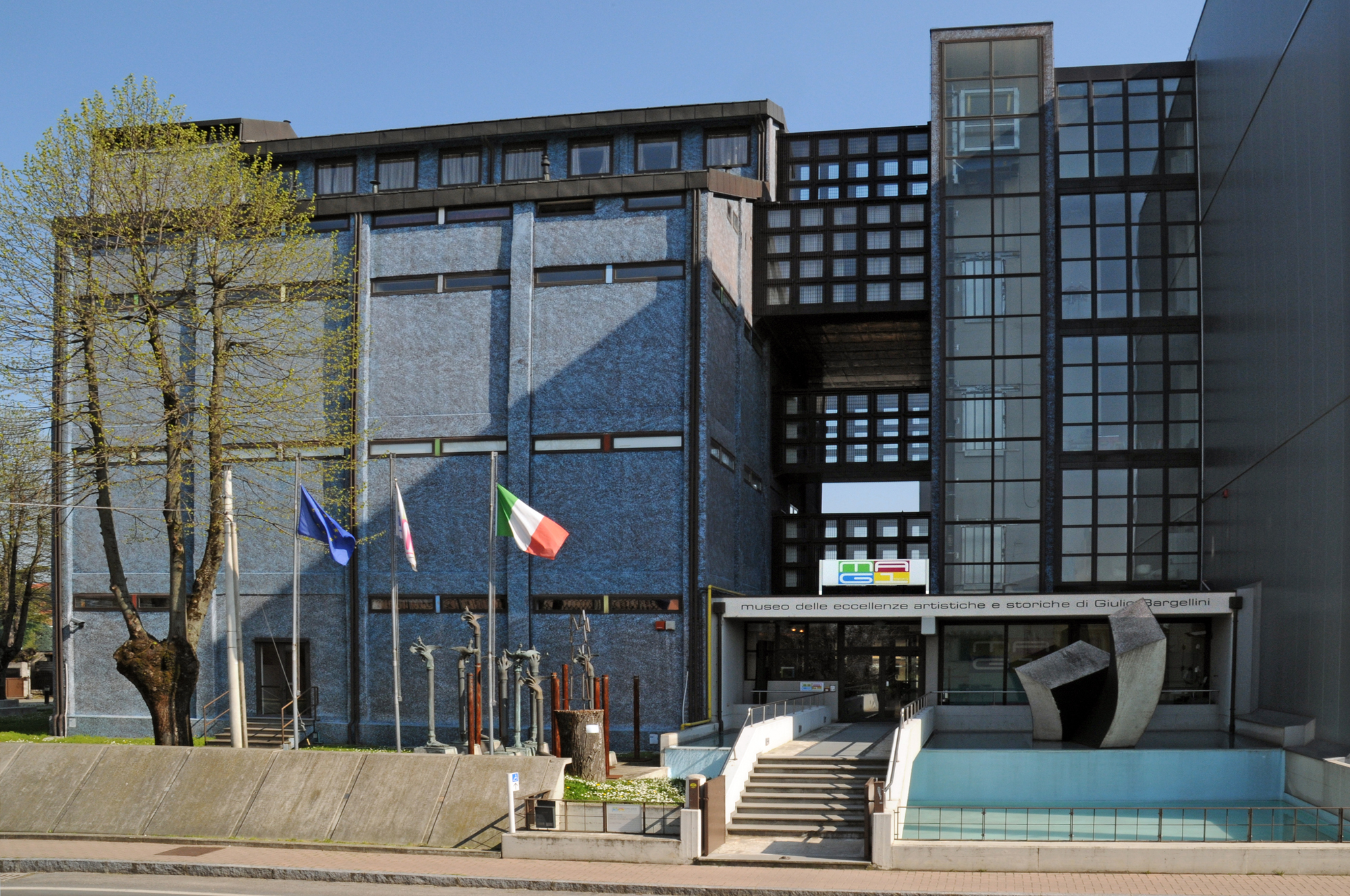
Main entrance of the Magi '900

The Museo MAGI ‘900 is a private museum in Pieve di Cento, Emilia-Romagna, Italy.

== Description ==
=== History ===
The Museo MAGI '900 was founded by entrepreneur and contemporary art collector Giulio Bargellini, who opened the space in 2000 to share his collection with the general public.

The museum displays over 2,000 works of contemporary art distributed throughout 9,000 m^{2} (97,000 sq ft) and it is housed in a singular building – formerly a barn silo of the 1930s. Thanks to a project of the architect Giuseppe Davanzo, the silo was converted into a museum, to which two new exhibition spaces and a large garden dedicated to sculpture were added later on.

=== The Collection ===
The diverse collection takes visitors on a journey through Italian and international art of the last century.

Bargellini's personal taste and connections with artists brought on the constitution of a wide permanent collection, which includes works from many movements; including the Belle Époque, sculptures by Giorgio de Chirico, the Maestri Storici del Novecento and hundreds of miniature paintings of the Collezione Minima 8x10 which once belonged to Cesare Zavattini.

The Museo MAGI ‘900 hosts numerous well-known and historicized artists as well as less-known ones, in an exhibition space separated into thematic sections.

Among the artists whose works appear in the museum are:

- Donald Baechler
- Massimo Baistrocchi
- Afro Basaldella
- Renato Birolli
- Giovanni Boldini
- Aroldo Bonzagni
- Alberto Burri
- Massimo Campigli
- Giuseppe Capogrossi
- Carlo Carrà
- Felice Casorati
- Bruno Cassinari
- Antonio Corpora
- Claudio Costa
- Giorgio de Chirico
- Raffaele De Grada
- Fortunato Depero
- Gerardo Dottori
- Lucio Fontana
- Franco Gentilini
- Giuseppe Guerreschi
- Virgilio Guidi
- Renato Guttuso
- Damien Hirst
- Paul Jenkins
- Carlo Levi
- Sol LeWitt
- Antonio Ligabue
- Leo Lionni
- Mario Mafai
- Alberto Magnelli
- Esther Mahlangu
- Francesco Menzio
- Amedeo Modigliani
- Ennio Morlotti
- Dennis Oppenheim
- Fausto Pirandello
- Arnaldo Pomodoro
- Giò Pomodoro
- Enrico Prampolini
- Aligi Sassu
- Alberto Savinio
- Emilio Scanavino
- Gino Severini
- Mario Sironi
- Philip Taaffe
- Mario Tozzi
- Emilio Vedova
- Renato Vernizzi
- Tom Wesselmann
- Zoran Music

=== Services ===
The permanent and the temporary collections can be visited by paying an entrance fee except for the OPEN BOX space, where there are always exhibitions and cultural events available for free. The museum organizes individual, thematic or personalized guided tours and offers laboratories for children as well as workshops for adults, which aim at making the participants understand art. The education department MAGICOMAGI offers a wide range of activities, from laboratories to animated visits for schools.
