= Mattia Moreni =

Italian artist (1920–1999)

Mattia Bruno Moreni (1920–1999) was an Italian sculptor and painter. He worked within the Arte Informale art movement. Moreni was a member of Gruppo degli Otto (English: Group of Eight), which included Afro Basaldella, Renato Birolli, Antonio Corpora, Ennio Morlotti, Giuseppe Santomaso, Giulio Turcato, and Emilio Vedova.

Moreni attended the Albertina Academy of Fine Arts (Italian: Accademia Albertina) from approximately 1940 to 1942, studying under Cesare Maggi and Enrico Paulucci.

He died on 29 May 1999 in Brisighella, Emilia-Romagna, Italy.
