= Basaldella =

Basaldella is an Italian surname. Notable people with the surname include:

- Afro Basaldella (1912–1976), Italian painter and educator
- Dino Basaldella (1909–1977), Italian sculptor and painter
- Mirko Basaldella (1910–1969), Italian sculptor and painter
- Santino Basaldella (born 2004), Argentine surfer
