= Armando Pizzinato =

Italian painter (1910–2004)

Armando Pizzinato (Maniago, 7 October 1910 – Venice, 17 April 2004) was an Italian painter.

== Biography ==
Armando Pizzinato was the elder son of Battista Pizzinato and Andremonda Astolfo. He started work at 15 to help his mother after the loss of his father. He made an apprenticeship with a house painter and later was employed in a local bank. Since childhood he had a passion for painting and drawing, and the purchase of the book Lives of the Most Excellent Painters, Sculptors, and Architects by Giorgio Vasari (The Lives) played a large role in developing that passion even more. He was still a teenager when the manager of the bank arranged lessons for Armando with the painter Pio Rossi. Then, in 1930, thanks to the money he was earning, he could be enrolled in the Accademia di Belle Arti di Venezia (School of fine arts of Venice). Shortly later he got to know some of his contemporaries such as Alberto Viani, Giulio Turcato, Mario De Luigi, Ferruccio Bortoluzzi (in the 40s), Carlo Scarpa, Afro Basaldella and Mirko Basaldella.

In 1933 he takes part with five paintings to the exhibition Cinque giovani pittori veneti (Five young painters from Veneto) in the Gallery Il Milione in Milan. In 1936 he obtains a Marangoni scholarship to go to Rome. In 1940 he is the winner of the second Premio Bergamo (Bergamo award) (National painting exhibition).

In 1941 he marries Zaira Candiani, with whom he had a daughter, Patrizia, born 19 August 1943. Zaira will be a source of inspiration for many of Pizzinato's paintings. After Zaira's death in 1962 Pizzinato married his second wife, Clarice Allegrini.

During WWII Pizzinato was a socialist member of the Italian resistance movement, he was arrested by the fascists and imprisoned. After the war Pizzinato dedicates his life to art. He joins Italian avant-garde movements and participates, with Emilio Vedova and others, to the creation of the Fronte Nuovo delle Arti. The Fronte movement made an exhibition at the Venice Biennale in 1948. Peggy Guggenheim, who visited that exhibition, bought there the painting Primo maggio (in English: May Day) of Pizzinato and later donated it to the MoMA, where it still is. In turn, Pizzinato donated to Peggy Guggenheim a couple of paintings, such as Cantieri, still part of the Peggy Guggenheim Collection. In those years he created, among other works, a mural with Emilio Vedova inspired by the Italian resistance.

In 1949 works of Pizzinato were included by Alfred Barr and James Thrall Soby in the exhibition 20th Century Italian Art at the MoMA. In 1950 the Catherine Viviano Gallery in New York included works by Pizzinato in the exhibition Five Italian Painters. The same year, Pizzinato was invited at the 1950 Pittsburgh International Exhibition of Contemporary Painting (Carnegie International in Pittsburgh). The painting Un fantasma percorre l'Europa, which is considered as one of Pizzinato's masterpieces, is dated 1950 (exhibited in the Galleria d'Arte Moderna Ca' Pesaro, Venice).

From 1950 on he deliberately brought the themes of his paintings in line with his political beliefs (e.g. works entitled Terra non Guerra, I difensori delle fabbricche, Saldatori). In 1952 he takes part to the exhibition Some contemporary Italian painters at the Crane Gallery in Manchester. The same year he participates to the Congress of People for Peace in Vienna. In 1968 he makes a large exhibition in Germany, first at the Neue Berliner Galerie and then at the Staatliche Kunstsammlungen Dresden. A work of Pizzinato is also part of the Verzocchi collection of the Pinacoteca civica di Forlì.

== Bibliography ==
- Virgilio Guidi, Armando Pizzinato, catalogo della mostra, Galleria del Milione, Milano, 1943
- Umbro Apollonio, "Armando Pizzinato", in Stefano Cairola (a cura di), Arte italiana del nostro tempo, Istituto Italiano di Arti Grafiche, Bergamo, 1946
- Maurizio Chierici, "Al pittore veneziano Pizzinato il puledrino del 'Premio Suzzara'", in Gazzetta di Parma, Parma, 15.9.1958
- Mario De Micheli, "Pizzinato: 30 anni di pittura", in L'Unità, Milano, 1.9.1962, p. 6
- Franco Solmi, Immagini del Realismo. Pizzinato, catalogo della mostra, Firenze, Galleria d'Arte Palazzo Vecchio, 1982
- Enzo De Martino, Armando Pizzinato. Opere dal 1949 al 1962, catalogo della mostra, Museo di Capri, 1983
- Giancarlo Pauletto, Pizzinato al Museo di Pordenone, catalogo della mostra, Edizioni Concordia, Pordenone, Museo Civico, 1983
- Giancarlo Pauletto, Luciano Padovese, Pizzinato a Maniago, Centro Culturale A. Zanussi, Pordenone, 1984
- Marco Goldin, Pizzinato, Electa, Milano, 1996
- Marzia Ratti, Armando Pizzinato. Dal Fronte Nuovo delle Arti ai Giardini di Zaira, Silvana Editoriale, La Spezia, 2001
- Giancarlo Pauletto, Luciano Padovese, Armando Pizzinato, Centro Culturale A. Zanussi, Pordenone, 2005, ISBN 88-8426-017-5
