= Giuseppe Santomaso =

Italian painter (1907–1990)

- Born: 26 September 1907; Venice, Veneto, Kingdom of Italy
- Died: 23 May 1990 (aged 82); Venice, Veneto, Italy
- Other name: Bepi Santomaso
- Education: Accademia di Belle Arti di Venezia
- Occupations: Painter, educator
- Movement: Arte Informale, Lyrical abstraction
- Awards: Feltrinelli Prize (1983)

Giuseppe "Bepi" Santomaso (26 September 1907 – 23 May 1990) was an Italian painter and educator. Santomaso was an important figure in 20th-century Italian painting, and he taught art at the Accademia di Belle Arti di Venezia for 20 years.

== Early life and education ==
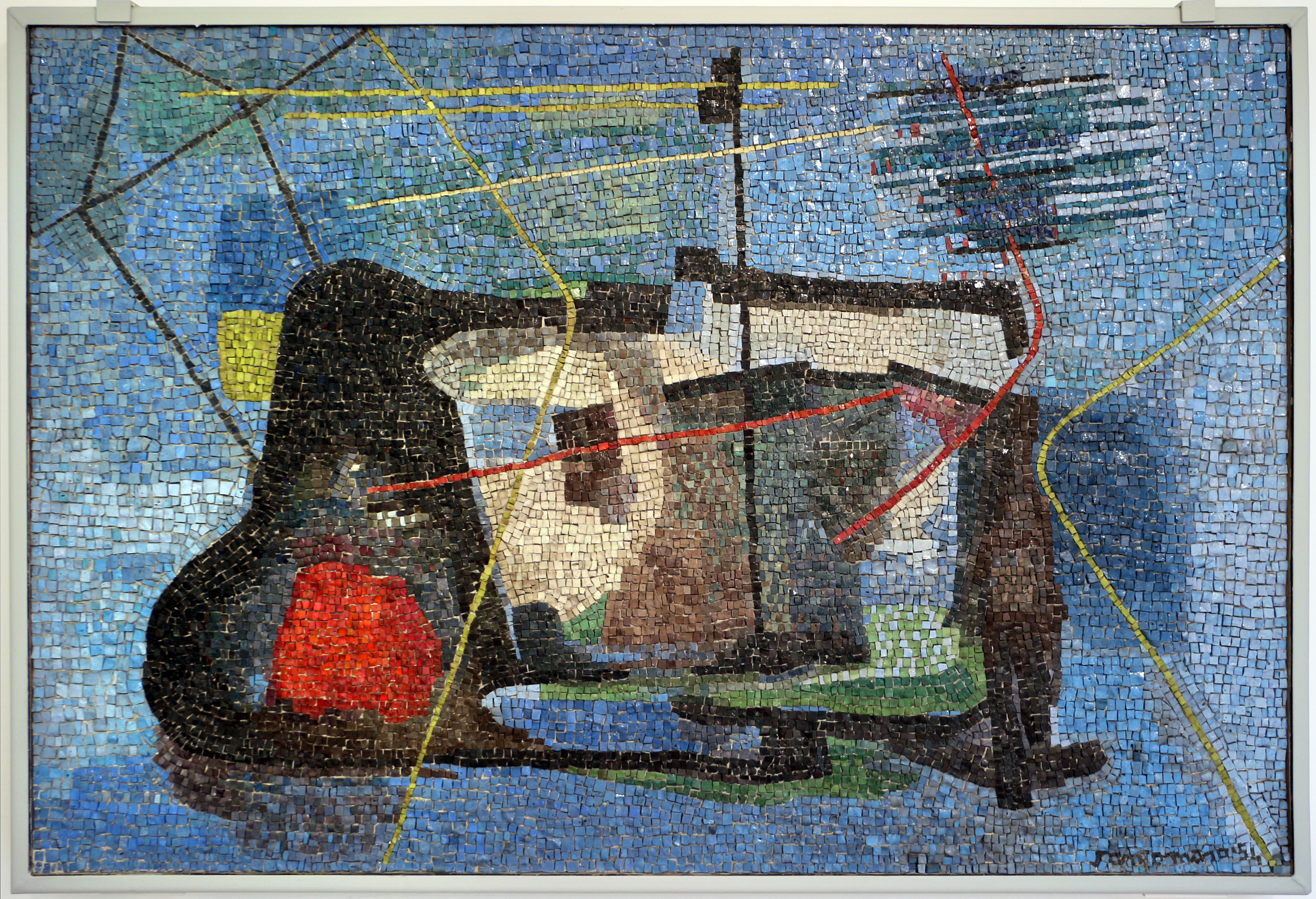
"il muro del pescatore" (1959)

Giuseppe Santomaso was born on 26 September 1907 in Venice, Veneto region, Kingdom of Italy (now Italy), to parents Ida Cattelan and Filippo Santomaso. His father was a master goldsmith.

In childhood he showed a talent in drawing and briefly studied under Venetian painter Luigi Scarpa Croce (1901–1967). In 1926, when he was 18 years old, he showed his work for the first time at Ca 'Pesaro in an exhibitions highlighting young artists at the Bevilacqua la Masa Foundation. From this experience he made friends with art critic Giuseppe Marchiori, and painter Leone Minassian. In 1932, he started his education at the Accademia di Belle Arti di Venezia.

== Career ==
Santomaso's early paintings were influenced by French modernism. In the 1940s, he painted Georges Braque-inspired still lifes, and abstract linear cages (or prisons). In the 1970s he shifted his focus and his renowned series Lettere a Palladio (1977; English: Letters to Palladio) featured abstract geometry influenced by architecture.

In 1934, Santomaso participated in the 19th Venice Biennale, and subsequently exhibited there often in the 1950s, including at the 27th Venice Biennale (1954).

In 1946, Santomaso and Emìlio Vedova were introduced by art critic Marchiori to Peggy Guggenheim in Venice. In the same year 1946, he signed an antifascist manifesto alongside Giuseppe Marchiori, Renato Birolli, Bruno Cassinari, Renato Guttuso, Ènnio Morlotti, Armando Pizzinato, Emìlio Vedova, Leoncillo Leonardi, and Lorènzo Viani; this group later formed the Fronte Nuovo delle Arti art movement.

After the dissolve of the Fronte Nuovo delle Arti in the early 1950s, and by 1952 Santomaso had joined the Group of Eight (art group). In the early 1950s he turned towards the Arte Informale art movement. From 1954 to 1974, he taught painting at the Accademia di Belle Arti di Venezia.

In 1983, he was awarded the Feltrinelli Prize for painting from Accademia dei Lincei. In 1992, the Guggenheim museum featured his Lettere a Palladio series and published a related exhibition book.

Santomaso died on 23 May 1990 in Venice.
