= Alessandro Filipponi =

Italian painter

Alessandro (Sandrino) Filipponi (30 March 1909 — 27 June 1931) was an Italian painter.

Filipponi was born in Udine in a poor family. His father Luigi was a painter, his mother's name was Elena Caterina Alessi. In the middle of the 1920s, he became friends with Basaldella brothers and started painting. At that point, he did not have any formal art education and was self-taught. In Summer 1928 he participated in an exhibition in Venice, which also gave him an opportunity to attend classes at the Accademia di Belle Arti di Venezia. Filipponi eventually returned to Udine and participated there in the exhibition of Friulian Avant-garde School. In 1930 he followed Afro Basaldella and went to Rome, where he met painters of the Scuola Romana and participated at the exhibition at the Rome Quadriennale. In 1931, he returned to Udine.

Alessandro Filipponi died in Udine in 1931 at the age of 22 of tuberculosis. Very few of his works survived; many are self-portraits he painted in Udine in 1929–1930. Some of the works are exhibited in Casa Cavazzini in Udine.
