= Speed Skater =

1983 artwork by Andy Warhol

Speed Skater is a 1983 work by the American artist Andy Warhol., made for the 1984 Winter Olympics in Sarajevo, then Yugoslavia.

== History ==
Lazar 'Lazo' Vujic, a gallerist originally from Sarajevo and working in Vienna, invited 16 artists to produce a portfolio of artworks in honor of 1984 Sarajevo Winter Olympics. Vujic, who knew Warhol from earlier times, invited Warhol to a project. According to Vujic, Warhol asked who are the other artists and when he heard that Henry Moore was one of them, he immediately agreed to join the team.

Other team members included David Hockney, Piero Dorazio, Henry Moore, Jean-Michel Folon, Giuseppe Santomaso, and Cy Twombly. Vujic's Visconti Fine Art gallery served as an official publisher. Each of the 16 artists produced one work associated with winter Olympics. Henry Moore made an image of Greek masks. Sports Illustrated commented it: "Winter Olympics or not, we shouldn't forget the contributions of the ancient Greeks." Folon depicted a ski jumper jumping against the firmament. David Hockney's produced a photo collage of a figure skater. Glaser drew five rings landing on a Corinthian column. Cy Twombly's work is named Graffiti, with "Yugoslavia" and "Olympics" in Serbo-Croatian. Over the 1983/84 winter before the Olympics, the exhibit 'Art and Sport Edition' was shown by Vujic's Visconti Art Gallery in New York, San Francisco, Los Angeles, San Diego, Toronto, Detroit, Chicago, Miami, Atlanta, Dallas, Vail, Aspen, Lake Tahoe, Denver, Indianapolis, Madison, and Minneapolis.

Warhol made Speed Skater as a screenprint in colours on wove paper. It was made in an edition of 150 plus ten artist's proofs. He also made some unique variants as trial proofs, each printed with different positions of the colour screens. Speed Skater was also produced in an edition of 10 Publisher's Proofs. Its sizes are 875 x 625 mm. The Speed Skater was used for the official Sarajevo Winter Olympics poster.
