= Ken Eastman =

English artist (born 1960)

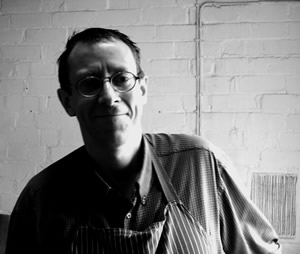
- Ken Eastman
- Born: 1960 (age 65–66); Watford, England
- Known for: Ceramics

Kenneth C Eastman (born 1960 in Watford) is an English ceramic artist, best known for his austere, flat bottomed, slab built ceramic vessels. He exhibits internationally and has won various awards in the field of ceramic arts, including the Italian Premio Faenza in 1995, the ‘Gold Medal’ at the World Ceramic Exposition 2001 Korea and the ‘President De la Generalitat Valencia’at the 5th Biennale International De Ceramica, Manises, Spain. In 1998 he was awarded the Arts Foundation Fellowship in Ceramics. He was elected as a member of the International Academy of Ceramics in 2003.

Alongside his studio work, Eastman also works as an Academic Researcher within the Design School of the Glasgow School of Art. Eastman's work at the Glasgow School of Art ended in 2011 when the School closed. He is represented in the UK by the Marsden-Woo Gallery, London. Eastman was shortlisted for the Loewe Foundation Craft Prize in 2024.

== Education ==
Eastman studied Ceramics at Edinburgh College of Art from 1979 to 1983 and at the Royal College of Art, in London, from 1984 to 1987.

== Artistic style ==
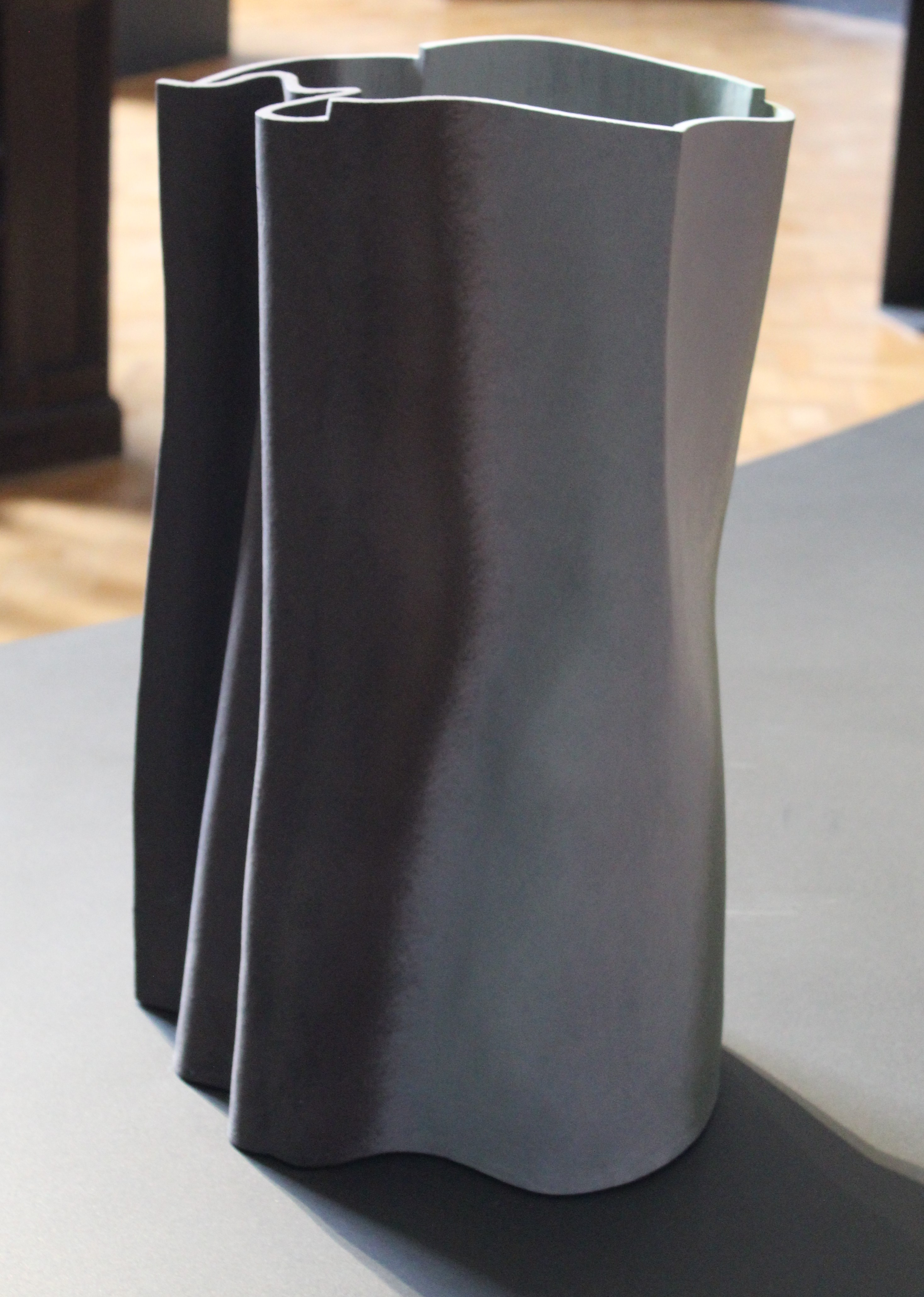
On My Way by Ken Eastman, Victoria and Albert Museum

While in Edinburgh, Eastman worked mainly in Raku. After arriving at the Royal College of Art in London he experimented in various ways of working with ceramic form, including sculpture, before confining himself to painting on rectangle ceramic platter shapes in a style very much in the spirit of Gillian Ayres, an artist whose work he greatly admired at the time. For many years his making has centered around a slab building technique using painted ceramic colours and oxides.

Craftscotland, a charity which supports Scottish crafts, describes his current work as centring on the idea of the vessel, pointing out that he has never made functional work, but uses the vessel as a subject - "to give meaning and form to an expression". David Whiting, on the other hand, states "Eastman is not so easy to classify. One tires of that lazy and over-used term “abstract vessel” when describing his work, because it is glib and reductive ....... Clearly, Ken Eastman is a maker of sculpture that evolves and works on its own terms, but is also a more concentrated – for now – response to the shape of things, to the world seen and felt".

Eastman has said of his own work "Part of the reason for making (in fact a very large part of the reason) is to see things that I have never seen before - to build something that I can not fully understand or explain."

== Selected public collections ==
- Victoria & Albert Museum UK
- Crafts Council UK
- Fitzwilliam Museum, Cambridge UK
- The Museum of Fine Arts, Houston, United States
