= Leoncillo Leonardi =

Italian sculptor (1915–1968)

- Born: 18 November 1915; Spoleto, Umbria, Italy
- Died: 3 September 1968 (aged 52); Rome
- Other name: Leoncillo
- Occupation: ceramic artist
- Years active: 1940–1968
- Parents: Fernando Leonardi (father); Giuseppina Magni (mother)

Leoncillo Leonardi (18 November 1915 – 3 September 1968), commonly known as Leoncillo, was an Italian sculptor who worked principally in glazed ceramics, often large-scale, and often using vivid colours. Until the mid-1950s, his work was mostly figurative, but it became more abstract thereafter. In 1946, he was among the founding members of the Nuova Secessione Artistica Italiana, which soon became the Fronte Nuovo delle Arti. He received the Premio Faenza in 1954 and again in 1964, and won the sculpture prize at the Biennale di Venezia of 1968. His work was also part of the sculpture event in the art competition at the 1948 Summer Olympics.

== Life ==
Leonardi was born on 18 November 1915 in Spoleto, in Umbria in central Italy, to Fernando Leonardi and Giuseppina Magni. One of his grandfathers was a cabinet-maker, the other a maker of musical instruments, and his father taught draughtsmanship at the Istituto Tecnico of Spoleto. In 1926, Leonardi started at the same school. From 1931 to 1935 he studied at the Istituto d'Arte of Perugia, in northern Umbria.

In 1935, he moved to Rome. He taught drawing at the Collegio Santa Maria, where his elder brother Lionello also taught, and also studied under Angelo Zanelli at the Accademia di Belle Arti di Roma. Through his brother, he met Libero de Libero, whose Galleria della Cometa was a meeting-place for the artists of the Scuola Romana, among them Mario Mafai and Antonietta Raphael, Afro and Mirko Basaldella, Corrado Cagli, Pericle Fazzini and Marino Mazzacurati.

In 1939, Leonardi married Maria Zampa; they had studied together at the Istituto d'Arte of Perugia. He moved to Umbertide, in Umbria, and became manager of a pottery works, the Ceramiche Rometti, where he acquired valuable practical experience. In 1942, he moved, without his family, back to Rome to take up a position teaching ceramics at the Istituto Statale d'Arte (now suppressed), where he would remain for ten years. During the Second World War, after the fall of the Fascist regime in Italy, he was active as a partisan, at first in Rome, and later with the Communist Brigata Innamorati in Umbria. He was strongly anti-Fascist in his views, and became a member of the Italian Communist Party. From 1947, he was among the artists who had – at a peppercorn rent – the use of studio space in the Villa Massimo, which until it was sequestered in 1945 had housed the Deutsche Akademie in Rome. Leonardi occupied Studio 3 and worked and lived there until 1956, when the villa was handed over to the Federal Republic of Germany. Among the other artists working at the villa were Emilio Greco, Renato Guttuso and Marino Mazzacurati.

Leonardi died suddenly in Rome on 3 September 1968; he was fifty-two.
