= Bruno Cassinari =

Italian painter and sculptor (1912–1992)

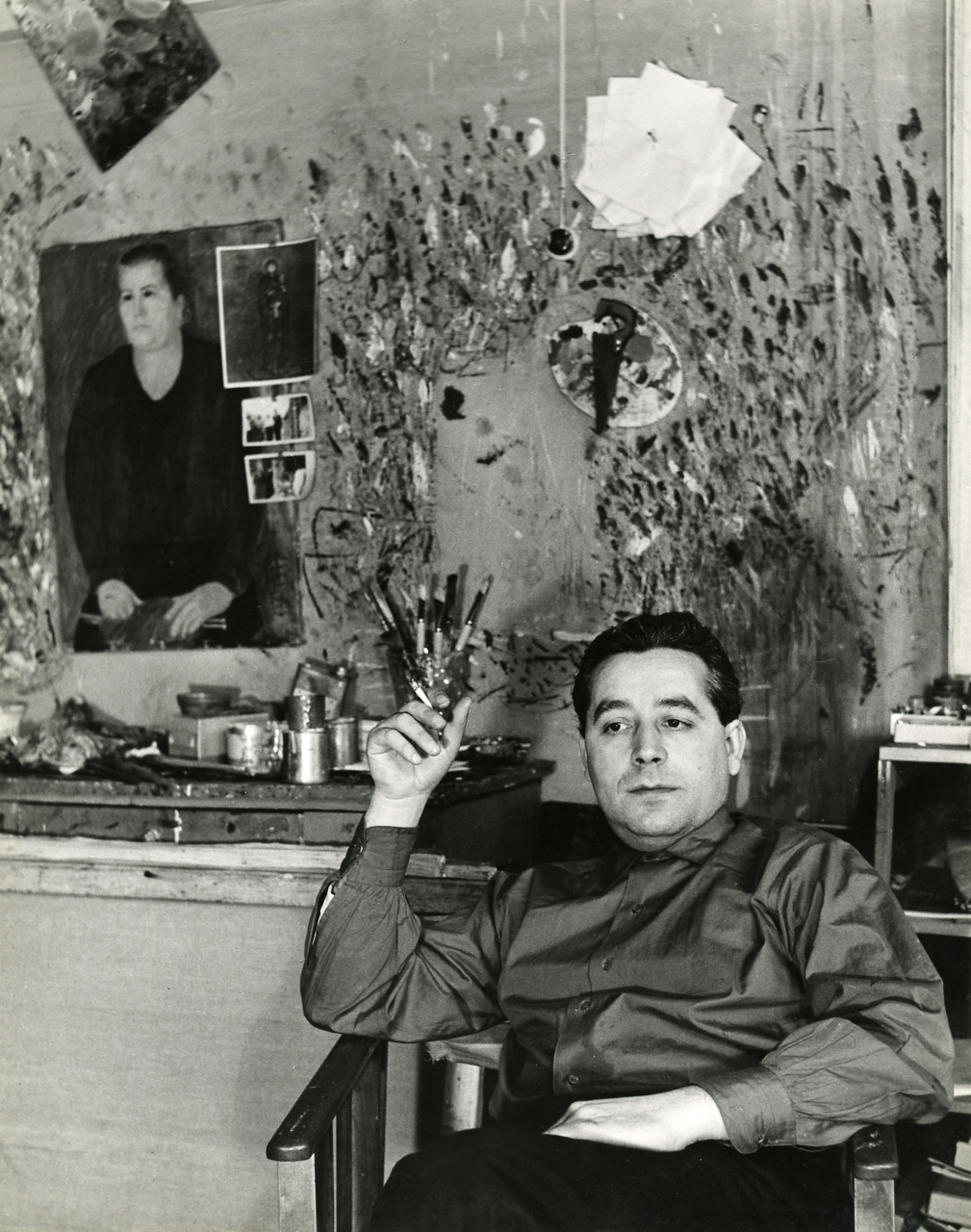
- Bruno Cassinari in his studio in Vence photographed by Paolo Monti in 1958
- Born: 29 October 1912; Piacenza, Italy
- Died: 26 March 1992 (aged 79); Milan, Italy
- Education: Brera Academy
- Known for: Sculpture, painting
- Movement: Cubism

Bruno Cassinari (29 October 1912 – 26 March 1992) was an Italian painter and sculptor who worked in a style that mixed cubist and expressionist elements.

== Biography ==
Cassinari was born in Piacenza, a city in Italy’s Emilia Romagna region. He attended the local art school but eventually decided to move to Milan, where he studied painting at the Brera Academy under Aldo Carpi. In 1946, he helped find the Fronte Nuovo delle Arti, an association aiming to restore optimism to post-war Italian art. Other members were Renato Birolli, Renato Guttuso, Ennio Morlotti, Leoncillo Leonardi, and Alberto Viani.

In 1949, Cassinari was invited by Pablo Picasso to exhibit his work at the Antibes Museum of Art. In 1952, he won the Grand Prize for Painting at the 26th Venice Biennale with his Cubist-inspired paintings, The Lemon and Still Life in Pink. In the 1960s, Cassinari briefly relocated to Venice. In 1986, he was recognised for his contributions to Italian painting with a large-scale retrospective of his work in Milan. Cassinari died in Milan on 26 March 1992, about one year after the death of his wife, Enrica.

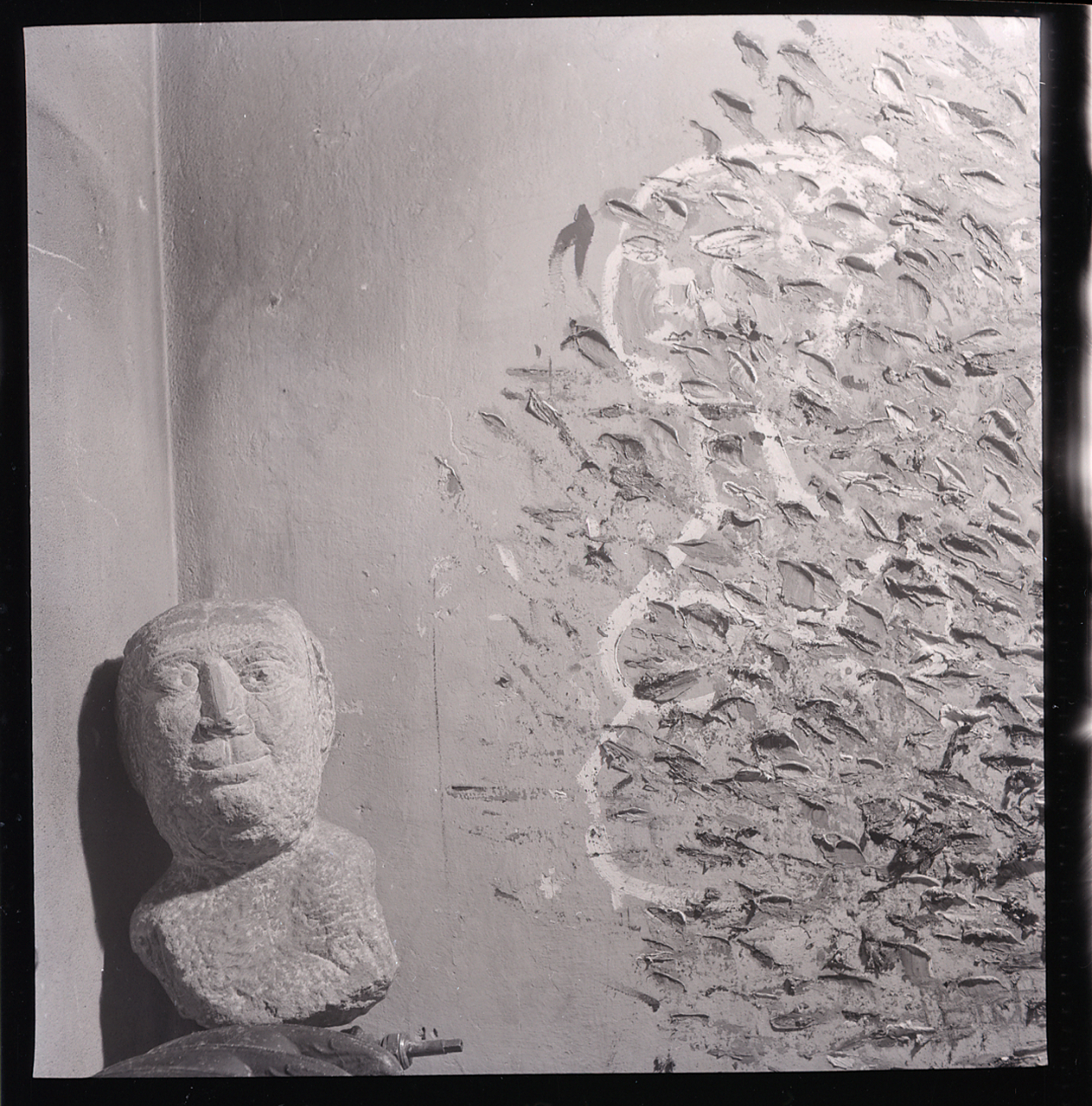
Cassinari's studio, Venice, 1963
