= Paul Jenkins (painter) =

American painter (1923–2012)

- Born: William Paul Jenkins; July 12, 1923; Kansas City, Missouri, U.S.
- Died: June 9, 2012 (aged 88); New York, U.S.
- Education: Art Students League of New York with Yasuo Kuniyoshi
- Known for: Painting
- Movement: Abstract expressionism, Lyrical abstraction

Paul Jenkins (July 12, 1923 – June 9, 2012) was an American abstract expressionist painter.

== Biography ==
=== Early years ===
William Paul Jenkins (known as Paul Jenkins) was born in 1923 in Kansas City, Missouri, where he was raised. He met Frank Lloyd Wright who was commissioned by the artist's great-uncle, the Rev. Burris Jenkins (whose own motto was to "live dangerously") to rebuild his church in Kansas City, Missouri after a fire. (Wright suggested that Jenkins should think about a career in agriculture rather than art.) The young Jenkins also visited Thomas Hart Benton and confided his intention to become a painter. The Eastern art collection of the Nelson-Atkins Museum (then, the William Rockhill Nelson Art Gallery) had an early influence on him.

In his teenage years, Jenkins moved to Struthers, Ohio to live with his mother, Nadyne Herrick, and stepfather, who both ran the local newspaper, the Hometown Journal (then the Struthers Journal). After graduating from Struthers High School, he served in the U.S. Maritime Service and entered the U.S. Naval Air Corps during World War II. In 1948, he moved to New York City where, on the G.I. Bill, he studied at the Art Students League of New York with Yasuo Kuniyoshi for four years, and with Morris Kantor. During that time, he met Mark Rothko, Jackson Pollock, Lee Krasner, and Barnett Newman. In 1953, he traveled to Europe, working for three months in Taormina in Sicily before settling in Paris, France. From 1955 on, the artist shared his time between New York and Paris.

== Chronology ==
=== 1950s ===
In 1953, after studying with Yasuo Kuniyoshi at the Art Students League of New York, Jenkins traveled to Italy and Spain, settling in Paris where his first solo exhibition took place in 1954 at Studio Paul Facchetti on the rue de Lille. Paul Facchetti, with the help of Alfonso Ossorio, held in 1952, an exhibition of the work of Jackson Pollock in his gallery, which was well known for showing works by abstract artists of the time, among others.

Jenkins' first solo exhibition in the US took place in 1954 at the pioneering gallery of Zoe Dusanne in Seattle. His first solo exhibition in New York was held in 1956 at the Martha Jackson Gallery, a leading gallery of the time. The Whitney Museum of American Art in New York purchased the painting "Divining Rod" from this exhibition. In the '50s, Jenkins achieved prominence both in New York and Europe for his early abstractions. At the Gutai exhibition held at the Martha Jackson Gallery in New York in 1958, Jenkins was invited by Jiro Yoshihara to work with Gutai in Osaka; however, Jenkins waited until 1964 to implement this invitation.

From the artist's studio in Paris in 1959, Peggy Guggenheim purchased "Osage," a work on canvas, and continued to later purchase the artist's work.

Jenkins continued to experiment with flowing paints, pouring pigment in streams of various thicknesses, with white linear overlays.

Jenkins, described as an abstract expressionist, would at times call himself "an abstract phenomenist." His early works were made in oil on primed canvas, as he continued working on paper with ink and with watercolor. In 1959 and 1960, he explored the writings of Goethe and Kant. Influenced by Goethe's color theories, he began to preface the titles of his works with the word "Phenomena" followed by a key word or phrase. Regarding his paintings, he once said, "I have conversations with them, and they tell me what they want to be called."

=== 1960s ===
Gradually in 1960 he moved away from working in oil on canvas to acrylic. Jenkins began to paint using an ivory knife, a key tool in the creation of his work:

I do not stain and I do not work on unprimed canvas. This is more significant than it may appear. Staining or working on unprimed canvas results in an inkblot-like effect where the paint penetrates the canvas and spreads out on its own. When I work on primed canvas, I can control the flow of paint and guide it to discover forms. The ivory knife is an essential tool in this because it does not gouge the canvas, it allows me to guide the paint.

— Paul Jenkins, Artist Statement

The art historian Albert E. Elsen has noted: "Jenkins was not staining his canvas, because of the sizing and priming."

Throughout the 60s, his work was shown worldwide, at major galleries and museums in Tokyo, London, New York, Paris, Amsterdam and elsewhere. In 1963, he took over Willem de Kooning's light-infused loft at Union Square in New York City where he worked until the end of 2000.

In 1964, he traveled to Tokyo for his exhibition at the Tokyo Gallery and worked with Gutai in Osaka. Gutai works in Jenkins' collection are later shown in a 2009 exhibition curated by Ming Tiampo at the Pollock-Krasner House & Study Center in The Springs, East Hampton, then traveling to The Harold B. Lemmerman Gallery, New Jersey City University. In 2010, this exhibition traveled to UB Anderson Gallery of the State University of New York Buffalo.

The Ivory Knife, a film by the Martha Jackson Gallery and Red Parrot, receives the Golden Eagle Award at the 1966 Venice Film Festival and is shown at the Museum of Modern Art in New York. His play, Strike the Puma, is published by Editions Gonthier in 1966, and in 1968 is performed off Broadway in New York City.

During this time, Harry Abrams decides against including what the artist called his "black and white photo montages" in the forthcoming monograph then in preparation and published in 1973 with text by the late art historian Albert E. Elsen. Fragments of these autobiographical montages are later integrated into expanded collages that form Anatomy of a Cloud, published by Harry N. Abrams in 1983.

In 1968, Jenkins began the creation of a limited number of solid and unique sculptures in glass with Egidio Costantini in Murano. Several of these works were shown in the 2007 exhibition Viva Vetro! Glass Alive! Venice and America, 1950-2006.

=== 1970s ===
Sculpture, already present in the artist's life in the 1950s, comes to the forefront with a series of works. In 1971, invited by Philip Pavia to participate in the Sculptors' Symposium held at the Cooper-Hewitt Museum in New York, Jenkins carves a 2-ton block of French limestone currently in the collection of the Hofstra Museum Sculpture Garden in Hempstead, New York. In this decade, the artist creates the first drawing for Meditation Mandala, a sculpture project for a park. Meditation Mandala is then cast in bronze, together with the sculptures Shakti Samothrace, Excalibur and Echo Chamber.

Collages, a little known aspect of the artist's work, begin to come into view. Prior to publication of Anatomy of a Cloud in 1983 by Harry N. Abrams, the artist's collages were largely unknown. A notable exception is the 1978 exhibition at the Gimpel Weitzenhoffer Gallery in New York, which integrated sculptural elements with collage. Yet, as early as the mid-fifties, visitors to the artist's Paris studio could see abstract collaged interior doors, as well as an inner wall later called Hokusai Arch, consisting of collaged Japanese woodcuts.

In 1971-1972 a retrospective of works on canvas organized by Gerald Nordland and Philippe de Montebello took place at the Houston Museum of Fine Arts and the San Francisco Museum of Art. The Corcoran Gallery of Art in Washington, D.C., initiates an exhibition of his watercolors which traveled across the US for two years.

In 1977, he begins to work in watercolor and on canvas in St. Croix in the Caribbean and is strongly influenced by the physicality of working outside, reminiscent of Taormina where he was confronted by color in a direct and decisive way. Jenkins gained a level of notoriety when his paintings appeared in the Academy Award-nominated 1978 movie An Unmarried Woman directed by Paul Mazursky.^{[32]} (People Magazine, June 19, 1978). In 1979, during a long stay in the Caribbean, impasto begins to appear in Jenkins' paintings and he completes Phenomena Forcing a Passage at the Mark, a decisive painting to him in discovering the scraped veils with prism concentrates.

=== 1980s ===
As he pursued working in acrylic and in watercolor, Jenkins began to build full-scale elements of the Meditation Mandala sculpture in steel at the Shidoni Foundry in Tesuque, New Mexico; these elements are later installed in the Sculpture Garden of the Hofstra Museum. At Shidoni Foundry, he also casts a unique sculpture in bronze, Four Corners.

In 1987, through the initiative of Jean-Louis Martinoty, the Paris Opera stages Shaman to the Prism Seen, a dance-drama written by Jenkins retracing the passage of colors through the prism. Jenkins paints two canvases 30 x 40 feet each for the stage set, together with vertical paintings on canvas as sentinel elements for the stage, as well as costumes and silks, and creates a sculptural prism dais for Shaman.

During the preparation of his monograph Anatomy of a Cloud, Jenkins creates collages in honor of the French theatre director and actor, Jean-Louis Barrault. These collages are shown at the French Cultural Services of the French Embassy in New York. At Barrault's request, these works travel to the theatre of the Renaud-Barrault Company, Le Théâtre du Rond-Point in Paris, to inaugurate La Maison Internationale du Théâtre, whose insignia is created from a work by the artist.

The director, Alan Schneider, enters Anatomy of a Cloud into his workshop of actors at the University of California, San Diego. Jenkins begins to use granular poured veils on scraped prism forms; abstract collage elements integrate themselves in the works on canvas.

Anatomy of a Cloud, an autobiographical book of what the artist calls "word impressions" and collages, is published by Harry N. Abrams in New York in 1983 and receives the silver medal from the Art Directors Club of New York.

=== 1990s ===
In 1990, invited by Abba Eban, Jenkins traveled to Israel and the following year to Japan and to Italy. In Paris, he created a series of original lithographs on stone entitled, Seven Aspects of Amadeus and the Others.

In 1991, Jenkins' Polyptychs on canvas entitled, Conjunctions and Annexes are shown in New York at the Gimpel Weitzenhoffer Gallery; a book of the same title is published with a text by Pascal Bonafoux.

In 1994, Water and Color/L'Eau et la Couleur, an exhibition of his watercolors, was initiated by PACA in Angers and traveled throughout France for two years.

In the late 1990s, the Steel elements of Meditation Mandala made by the artist at the Shidoni Foundry in New Mexico were installed in the sculpture garden of Hofstra University in Hempstead, NY.

In 1999, the Hofstra Museum held an exhibition of the artist's works on canvas from 1954-1960 in New York and Paris.

=== 2000s ===
In 2000, the Butler Institute of American Art in Ohio exhibited Jenkins' works on paper from the exhibition, Water and Color.

In 2003 Jenkins began to exhibit with the Redfern Gallery in London. In 2005, he created specific works on canvas in New York for As Above So Below, a temporary installation at the Silvacane Abbey, a 12th-century Cistercian abbey in La Roque-d'Anthéron, near Aix-en-Provence. In 2005, Œuvres Majeures, an exhibition of works on canvas together with watercolors, was shown at the Palais des Beaux-Arts in Lille in 2005.

In 2007, 2008, and 2009, Jenkins donated around 5,000 pieces from his archive to the Archives of American Art of the Smithsonian Institution, then his personal papers.

=== 2010s ===
In 2010, the new Crocker Art Museum building exhibited, Paul Jenkins: The Color of Light, 50 watercolors including large-scale and works originally created in conjunction with his dance-drama performed at the Paris Opera, together with selected paintings on canvas.

=== Death ===
Jenkins died in Manhattan, USA in 2012, one month prior to his 89th birthday, after suffering an illness. The Strand Bookstore in Manhattan, which the artist loved to frequent over many years, devoted a window to him when they learned of his death.

== Public collections (selected list) ==
- Archives of American Art of the Smithsonian Institution (6,000+ items).
- Butler Institute of American Art, Youngstown
- Carnegie Museum of Art, Pittsburgh, PA
- Centre Georges Pompidou, Paris
- Corcoran Gallery of Art, Washington, D.C.
- The Fogg Museum of Art of Harvard University, Cambridge
- Fondation Maeght, Saint-Paul-de-Vence, France
- The Governor Nelson A. Rockefeller Empire State Plaza Art Collection, Albany, NY
- Hirshhorn Museum and Sculpture Garden, Washington, D.C.
- Museum of Modern Art, New York
- National Gallery of Art, Washington, D.C.
- Smithsonian American Art Museum, Washington, D.C.
- San Francisco Museum of Modern Art, San Francisco
- Solomon R. Guggenheim Museum, New York
- Stedelijk Museum, Amsterdam
- Tate, London
- Whitney Museum of American Art, New York
- MAGI '900- Museum of Artistic and Historical Excellence, Pieve di Cento, Italy

== Exhibitions ==
=== Retrospective exhibitions ===
- 1987 Musée Picasso, Antibes
- 1980-1981 Palm Springs Desert Museum, Palm Springs, California
- 1974 Musée des Beaux-Arts de Charleroi, Charleroi, Belgium
- 1971-1972 Museum of Fine Arts, Houston (1971) and the San Francisco Museum of Art (1972) (first American retrospective)
- 1964 kestnergesellschaft, Hanover

=== Major solo exhibition ===
- 2022 Paul Jenkins: Works on Canvas from the Nineties and Noughties, Ronchini, London
- 2020 Paul Jenkins: Works on Canvas from the 1960s and 1970s, Ronchini, London
- 2014 "Paul Jenkins on canvas and paper 1989-2009." RedFern Gallery, London.
- 2010 Paul Jenkins: The Color of Light. Crocker Art Museum, Sacramento, California
- 2010 Paul Jenkins in the 1960s and 1970s: Space, Color and Light, University at Buffalo Anderson Gallery, Buffalo, NY
- 2010 Paul Jenkins: On the Rim of Time. Palazzo Pacchiani, Prato, Italy
- 2005 Œuvres Majeures, Palais des Beaux-Arts de Lille
- 2000–2001 Viaggio in Italia, Basilica Palladiana, Vicenza
- 2000 Center for the Arts, Vero Beach, Florida. Collage retrospective
- 1999 Paul Jenkins: The Early Years in Paris 1954–1960, Hofstra Museum, Hofstra University, Hempstead
- 1997 The Butler Institute of American Art, Youngstown, Ohio
- 1994 Water and Color, watercolor exhibition traveling in France
- 1989 Broken Prisms and Shaman to the Prism Seen, Musées de Nice
- 1972 Corcoran Gallery of Art, Washington, D.C. Watercolor exhibition.
- 1962 Kölnischer Kunstverein, Cologne

== Bibliography ==
- Berger, John. "The colour code", The Guardian, October 19, 2005.
- Bonafoux, Pascal. Paul Jenkins: Conjunctions and Annexes. Editions Galilée, Paris, 1991. OCLC 24730696
- Cassou, Jean Jenkins. Published by Harry N. Abrams, 1963. OCLC 576470
- Elsen, Albert E., Paul Jenkins, Harry N. Abrams, Inc., 1974. (An extensive monograph with text by the late distinguished art historian). OCLC 788667
- Herskovic, Marika. American Abstract Expressionism of the 1950s An Illustrated Survey, New York School Press, 2003. OCLC 50253062
- Nordland, Gerald, with introduction by Philippe de Montebello. Paul Jenkins, Universe Books/Houston Museum of Fine Arts/San Francisco Museum of Art, 1971-1972. (In conjunction with the artist's retrospective). OCLC 689477
- Sawyer, Kenneth B. and Restany, Pierre. Paintings Paris: Editions Two Cities, 1961.
- Trapp, Frank Anderson. Paul Jenkins: Water and Color. 1994. OCLC 32654407

=== Selected writings by the artist ===
- Jenkins, Paul. Strike the Puma. Editions Gonthier, Paris, 1966. (A play by the artist). OCLC 459457
- Jenkins, Paul, and Suzanne Donnelly Jenkins. Anatomy of a Cloud, Harry N. Abrams, Inc., 1983. (A book of autobiographical collages and texts by the artist).
- Jenkins, Paul, and Suzanne Donnelly Jenkins. Anatomie d'un nuage. Paris: Ed. Galilée. 1985. OCLC 25859265
- Jenkins, Paul and Jenkins, Esther. Observations of Michel Tapié. George Wittenborn in New York, 1956.
- Further writings

== Traces ==
- Jenkins gained a level of notoriety when his paintings appeared in the Academy Award-nominated 1978 movie An Unmarried Woman directed by Paul Mazursky. The film featured a brooding and bearded British abstract painter played by the British Sir Alan Bates.
- A selection of Jenkins' works from the fifties are featured in the 1998 film, A Soldier's Daughter Never Cries, from the novel by Kaylie Jones, based on her years in Paris with her parents, the writer James Jones and his wife, Gloria.
- The sculpture "Alert Hare" features in every episode of BBC TV Series Inside No. 9.

== See also ==
- Lyrical Abstraction
- Tachisme
