= Arte Informale =

Art movement

Arte Informale is a term coined in 1950 by the French critic Michel Tapié to refer to the art movement that began during the mid-1940s in post-World War II Europe. This movement also paralleled the Abstract Expressionism movement that was taking place at the same time in the United States, and had ties to the Arte Povera movement. Sometimes referred to as Tachism, Art Autre or Lyrical Abstraction, it was a type of abstraction in which form became less important than that of the expressive impulses of the artist, and was opposed to the rationalism of traditional abstraction. The qualities of informal art explore the possibilities of gesture, materials (often non traditional), and signage as the basis of communication. Oftentimes art characterized as informal is executed spontaneously and the approach to painting and sculpture are generally gestural, performative, expressionistic and experimental. Certain artists such as Lucio Fontana, Alberto Burri and Emilio Vedova were crucial figures of this movement.

Arte Informale is based on the convention of painting while expanding the concept to include time-based themes and viewer dependent trials. Alberto Burri, Emilio Vedova, and Lucio Fontana are the three main Italian artists to question the limits of painting and sculpture by reassigning the expressive qualities. They tried to create new channels of communication to forge new styles that would reach beyond their predecessors. However, they were unable to break away from the history of Italian art.

Arte Informale became an internationally accepted movement that reached the New York School, the Japanese Gutai Group, and the South American Abstractionists. However, the primary adherents were French and Italian avant-garde artists. It was a movement wherein artists created a dialogue between material, subject, and the world. It was a rejection of the constrained thoughts of previous modern painters.

== Alberto Burri ==
Alberto Burri worked in Rome and was a role model for younger artists. By observing the connection between culture and nature he saw that material had an existence of its own and that he as the artist was required to use the energy from the organic materials. Burri introduced energy, life, death, and destruction into his work through the use of natural and industrial materials. Burri was a solitary, quiet and aloof artist. His style emphasised the ethical weight and burden of living in a post-world war two era. As a modernist Burri tried to give shape and rationality to the disorder of post-atomic contemporary culture by extending and exploring the limits of painting.

In the 1950s in Rome the Gruppo Origine was founded which, brought artist like Ettore Colla and Burri together. They shared in common their rejection of abstract painters as too far detached from reality and realist painters as too disengaged from the relationship between life and art. However, Burri showed this through his work Sacchi by using thrown away burlap sacks and the method of suture that would reference human aspects and the practice of contemporary living. He used the terms 'form' and 'space' to attain synchronization and stability in his work. Burri addressed the issues of energy, life, death, and destruction into his work through the use of natural and industrial materials.

=== Sacchi ===
The Sacchi was first created in 1950 but hundreds were made. Burri created these Sacchi by tearing and scoring pieces of burlap, adding stitching, then placing them on a canvas. Sometimes they were singed or accompanied by paint, red plastic or resin. On one hand the Sacchi acted as a concept of incorporating aspects of everyday life into art. On the other hand, it was thought to be associated with the body. Burri had been trained as a doctor and worked as a surgeon in the war until he was captured and sent to an American POW camp in Texas, which is where he first started using burlap sacs. His past was the basis for a general consensus between critics was that it was a suggestion to the troubled status of Burri after the war. Lorenza Trucchi suggested that the burlap acted as a skin that Burri could project his traumatized recollections on. Francesco Arcangeli implied that Burri used violence to recognize and remind the viewers of the war. However, Maurizio Calvesi brought up the meaning of the material itself. At the time when Arte Informale was starting up in Italy the war had ended, the economy was fluctuating and the U.S Marshall Plan had been put into place. Calves thought that Burri's use of the burlap sac was due to the commonality of the leftover food bags and that he was commemorating poverty.

== Lucio Fontana ==
Lucio Fontana (1899-1968) was one of the key figures of the post-war contemporary art scene in Europe. He was the founder of the Spatialism movement in Milan, and is best known for his Concetti spaziali (Spatial Concepts) where he pierced and cut canvases that worked to open up the flat surface of the painting into real space. His ideas were influential in the development of artists’ groups such as Azimuth and the Zero Group, as well as to the development of Arte Povera.

In 1946 he wrote Manifesto Blanco that was signed by a number of his students in Buenos Aires. At the end of the 1950s Fontana showed his work at the Venice Biennale and other parts of Europe such as Germany and France.

The work of Fontana during post-war Milan created a shift in autonomous art object towards an exploration of art as a total environment. Through Fontana's Spatial Environment of 1949 he worked to tie together architecture, painting, and sculpture, and had proposed an art form which integrated both reality and ambient space. In these environments, the gallery space was transformed with the manipulation of light, shadow and space to create a complete experience. These gestural and experiential qualities of form and making are both characteristics of the informal artist movement.

Fontana's Spatial Concept of 1951 sought to propose art forms that would complement modern developments in building technology. Light within space became grounds for this development in neon, which eventually was installed in the 1951 Milan Triennial. The Spatial Concept “engaged the viewer with an opulent vision of radiance that extended into real architectural space beyond the limited and private pictorial plane.” This inclusion of the audience in turn also provided Fontana's environments with performers.

Both Spatial Environment and Spatial Concept was Fontana's response to the difficult challenge of producing utopian artwork after the distress of World War II.

Fontana's “research into ‘Spatialism’, together with his charismatic presence in Milan, were determinant in encouraging the rise of Arte Povera in Italy.” Fontana's contribution lies in the transition from an art of representation to an art of sheer perception, in which the work is a part of reality. Although Fontana does not identify himself as an informal artist, the language used in his work fits within the qualities of this movement.

== Ennio Morlotti ==
Ennio Morlotti was an Italian painter who was part of the Arte Informale movement. He met up with the Arte Informale group when he visited Paris in 1947. This meeting is what started leading him in the direction of Matter Painting. He showed his works in the Venice Biennale in 1948, 1952, and 1956. The main theme of his works has been landscapes and his own style focuses on color and material on the work of art. He works with the natural pattern of nature in organic and inorganic forms. Morlotti along with Emilio Vedova and other artists signed the Manifestio del Realismo in 1946 in Milan stating that the style of Realism is dependent on communication with others as opposed to Naturalism or Abstraction.

== Emilio Vedova ==
Emilio Vedova (1919-2006) was a self-taught painter from Venice. At the end of World War II he took an active part in the liberation of Venice and in 1946 he joined the Fronte Nuovo delle Arti, a movement that aimed at reconciling social revolution in artistic expression. Vedova was influenced by art movements such as Cubism and Expressionism and admired the works of Tintoretto, Rembrandt, Goya and Picasso. In the 1940s his style became increasingly gestural and began to fit in with the qualities of Lyrical Abstraction or Abstract Expressionism. Vedova's works were attempting to explore the three-dimensional space through painting and to achieve depth within space.

== Giuseppe Capogrossi ==
Giuseppe Capogrossi (1900-1972) was an Italian painter from Rome. Around 1950 Capogrossi transitioned from figurative painting towards abstraction. In 1951 he founded the Gruppo Origine along with Ballocco, Colla and Burri. “Their manifesto advocated the refusal of three-dimensional figuration, the use of color to serve a purely expressive purpose, and the use of primitive images, whose significance dates back to the birth of writing systems and symbols”. After this time, Capogrossi composed his paintings on the basis of a single symbol- a sort of trident- which is repeated on his canvases and collages. In Capogrossi's work he discussed the impossibility of communication from artist to viewer, so he stressed that the artist must show the viewer what he wishes to communicate.
