= Premio Faenza =

- Awarded for: contemporary ceramic art
- Date: 1938
- Location: Faenza
- Country: Italy
- Presented by: Museo Internazionale delle Ceramiche in Faenza
- Winners: Full list of recipients: 1938: Pietro Melandri; 1939: Pietro Melandri; 1941: Emilio Casadio and Carlo Corvi; 1942: Giuseppe Mazzullo; 1946: Angelo Biancini and Anselmo Bucci; 1949: Anselmo Bucci, Guido Gambone ex aequo; 1952: Antonio Scordia and Guerrino Tramonti; 1953: Salvatore Meli, Carlo Zauli ex aequo; 1954: Leoncillo Leonardi; 1955: Carlo Negri, Guerrino Tramonti ex aequo; 1956: Germano Belletti, Gian Battista Valentini ex aequo; 1957: Angelo Biancini; 1958: Carlo Zauli; 1959: Guido Gambone; 1960: Guido Gambone; 1961: Gian Battista Valentini; 1962: Carlo Zauli; 1963: Fulvio Ravaioli, Pompeo Pianezzola ex aequo; 1964:Leoncillo Leonardi, Rogier Vandeweghe ex aequo; 1965: Berndt Friberg; 1966: Wilhelm and Elly Kuch; 1967: Eduard Chapallaz; 1968: Hilkka Liisa Ahola; 1969: Vlastimil Květenský; 1970: Goffredo Gaeta, Ivo Sassi ex aequo; 1971: Panos Tsolakos; 1972: Yasuo Hayashi; 1973: Wilhelm and Elly Kuch; 1974: Georges Blom; 1975: Colin Pearson; 1976: Alfonso Leoni, Paul Donhauser ex aequo; 1977: Gian Battista Valentini; 1978: Mirko Orlandini; 1979: Maria Teresa Kuczynska; 1980: Guido Mariani; 1981: Michel Kuipers; 1982: Aki Matsui Toshio; 1983: Jo-Anne Caron Devroey, Emidio Galassi ex aequo; 1984: Giuseppe Lucietti; 1985: Sueharu Fukami; 1986: (no award); 1987: Franz Stähler; 1989: Enrico Stropparo; 1991: Svetlana Nikolaevna Pasechnaya; 1993: Tjok Dessauvage, Aldo Rontini ex aequo; 1995: Ken Eastman; 1997: Michael Cleff; 1999: Torbjørn Kvasbø; 2001: Ana Cecilia Hillar; 2003: Jun Nishida; 2005: Silvia Zotta, Tomoko Kawakami ex aequo; 2007: Simone Lucietti, Ian Mcdonald ex aequo; 2009: Tomonari Kato, Andrea Salvatori ex aequo; 2011: Shigeki Hayashi, Eri Dewa, Giovanni Ruggiero ex aequo; 2013: Päivi Rintaniemi, Alessandro Neretti; 2015: Silvia Celeste Calcagno, Helene Kirchmair, Thomas Stollar ex aequo
- Website: www.premiofaenza.it

The Premio Faenza is an international prize for Premio Faenza Awarded for contemporary ceramic art Date 1938 Location Faenza Country Italy Presented by Museo Internazionale delle Ceramiche in Faenza Winners Full list of recipients[1] Website www.premiofaenza.it contemporary ceramic art. It is awarded by the Museo Internazionale delle Ceramiche in Faenza at Faenza, in Emilia-Romagna in northern Italy, and is the principal Italian prize of its kind.

== History ==
The prize was established in 1931. In 1938 it became an annual national award and was named "Premio Faenza". The first recipient of the Premio Faenza was Pietro Melandri, who also won it in the following year. The award was not made in some years of the Second World War, and recommenced in 1946. In 1963 it became international in scope – although several foreign artists had already been invited to participate in earlier editions – and from 1989 it became a biennial award.

== Recipients ==
Among the recipients of the award are the sculptors Angelo Biancini (1946, 1957), Leoncillo Leonardi (1954, 1964) and Carlo Zauli (1953, 1958 and 1962), and the ceramic artists Sueharu Fukami (1985) and Ken Eastman (1995).
