= Sueharu Fukami =

Japanese ceramic artist and sculptor

Sueharu Fukami (深見陶治, born 1947) is a Japanese ceramic artist and sculptor known for his work in pale-blue qinbai porcelain (also referred to as Sei Hakuji / Celadon). Fukami's abstracted, sculptural ceramic works depart from the traditional Japanese artisan traditions of his upbringing and instead explore natural phenomena and universal senses like "infinite space" through sharp silhouettes, sweeping curves, architecturally-inspired arches, and delicately-colored glaze. His minimalist approach to porcelains has contributed to defining and expanding the meaning, importance, and popularity of contemporary Japanese ceramics beyond craft art circles, most notably to fine art collectors and museums globally.

== Biography ==
Fukami was born in the Sennyu-ji temple area in Higashiyama, the eastern mountains of Kyoto, Japan. Higashiyama is a traditional center of the city's renowned ceramic industry and highly populated with potters' workshops and ceramicists. He was born the sixth child after two boys and three girls, and was surrounded by a vibrant local ceramics community as a child. His father, Yoshiichi Fukami, came from a village of potters near the ancient ceramic city of Seto, in today's Aichi Prefecture. To escape the competition of the Seto community, his father moved to Kyoto in its boom years before World War II, training in a ceramic workshop before establishing his own kiln, Fukami Ryōsen, which specialized in Fukusuke figures: ceramic figurines often placed in storefronts and merchants shops for good fortune. Later, Fukami's father and elder brothers Takehisa and Naokatsu reinvented the family business to focus on fine, hand-painted porcelain vessels for kaiseki food ceremonies. Their handling of the family firm allowed Fukami to focus on developing a personal style out of experiments with numerous ceramic object types.

== Education and professional activity ==
Fukami studied ceramics at Kyoto Arts and Crafts Training Centre and graduated at age eighteen in 1965. His early work consisted mainly of stoneware. Following graduation, at age twenty Fukami worked with the family firm before being encouraged by a friend to enter into an art competition. Fukami subsequently submitted of one of his porcelain works to the prestigious Nitten Exhibition (The Japan Fine Arts Exhibition), one of Japan's largest art competitions. Its acceptance and inclusion in the prestigious venue allowed him to earn early notoriety as an artist and commit fully to a career as a professional ceramicist. Fukami began concentrating on qingbai glaze in 1975 and developed his signature high-pressure slip-casting technique in 1980. His initial success was not immediately followed by further recognition, however, leading him to reinvent his work and style several times before finding his acclaimed signature style. In 1975, Fukami married his wife Chieko Takahashi, a fellow ceramic artist, who scholars suggest aided him in finding his working technique.

Fukami's ceramic sculptures were introduced outside of Japan for the first time when he won Grand Prix for the 43rd Premio Faenza in 1985. Fukami became the third Japanese ceramicist ever to win this internationally acclaimed annual ceramic art competition held in Faenza, Emilia-Romagna, Italy. This achievement was followed by a successful solo exhibition tour in Europe in 1986 as the winner of the previous year's competition. In 2005, Fukami was invited to show again in Faenza, this time as a solo show featuring 25 prize-winning works to commemorate the twentieth anniversary of his international career.

This came on the heels of Fukami's major retrospective of early works at the Ruth and Sherman Lee Institute for Japanese Art at the Clark Center for Japanese Art and Culture in Hanford, California in 2002. In 2002, American collector and founder of the Lee Institute, Willard G. Clark, visited Fukami's Kyoto studio and acquired forty early works for the Institute as promised gifts. One of these pieces was Haruka na Umi (Distant Ocean), a prize-winning ceramic sculpture from the 1976 Japan Contemporary Arts and Crafts Exhibition. The Lee Institute's 2002 exhibition featured three prize-winning works from the 1985 Premio Faenza, including this newly acquired Haruka no kakei (Distant Seascape), as well as Kaze no kaikei (Seascape of Wind) and Kyoko no omoi (Pure Thought). After several later additional acquisitions, the Clark now holds 52 pieces and constitutes the largest and most representative collection of Fukami's works to date.

Fukami's 1.2-meter-wide horizontal sculpture titled Shinsho II (Infinity II), held by the Brooklyn Museum of Art in New York is one of the best examples of his work from the 1990s. It is installed as a permanent installation at the Museum that Asian Art Curator and Chair Amy Poster notes is one of the most popular works of art in the Brooklyn Museum's Japanese gallery.

== Work ==
Early Work

Early in his career, Fukami's work took on a range of expression and experimentation. The period of Fukami's twenties was marked by social unrest in Japan between fierce student protests, the Vietnam War, and the hippie movement. During this time, the leading popular art forms included Abstract Expressionism and rock music. Responding to these instabilities, some of Fukami's early works took on overt political messaging, such as his 1973 piece Jōhō ni maibotsu sareta watashi (The Artist, Buried in Information), a cylindrical vessel with a small seated figure in the center. The form of the work was meant to represent the artist buried under the weight of information in the form of jumbled printed matter bearing down on all sides. Another one of Fukami's noted early works from 1974 is a large, hand-built stoneware sculpture in irabo (brown ash) glaze titled Wakakihi no Rinri (Morals of a Young Day) whose top represents a national flag while its body signifies the masses oppressed by national ideology. His 1972 work Ehon no yume (The Dream of the Picture Book) took a poetic, whimsical form: a pottery book opened to reveal a blue-and-white porcelain balloon on which Fukami invited his young niece to draw pictures of popular anime characters. Through the artist's early technical experimentation he sought to create works that had universality and permanence of vision.

Technique

Since 1975, Fukami's work has focused exclusively on perfecting qinbai (Seihakuji in Japanese) porcelain. Determined to master the tradition, the artist made a personal pact. As he states: "When I started high-pressure slip casting, I promised myself that I would immerse myself thoroughly in tracking down my true self in this porcelain and qingbai glaze. And that I wouldn’t flip-flop and go back to stoneware. If I ran into a wall, then I’d run into it. If I couldn’t break down that wall, then that was my own problem, and maybe I should give up, knowing that it was only due to deficiencies in my own talent. So I decided with conviction and determination, to stick with this medium when I was 33 years old." Five years after committing to qinbai glaze, Fukami developed his unique high-pressure slip-casting technique, which involves the pressurized injection of liquid clay into specially-made plaster molds, condensed to remove air pockets and impurities. The molds are produced with semi-porcelain and covered in plaster, often created in pieces and fitted together to assemble the final sculptural form. After bisque-firing in an electric kiln, the work is sprayed with the celadon glaze, and then reduction-fired in a gas kiln for approximately 30 hours. Once the mold is removed, the work is dried completely. Fukami then uses a Tungaloy alloy blade and sandpaper to sharpen the form and hone the clay's finer details. Fukami aims to create about eight pieces per individual mold, sometimes over the span of several years, with some pieces taking from three months to a year to complete. With this process, Fukami is typically able to produce only 6 to 8 sculptures per year. Despite the use of molding, Fukami states that shaping the works is still a highly labor-intensive process, requiring meticulous smoothing, whittling, and glazing, often repeated several times. This technique allows for distinctive forms that resist warping, or what he calls te-ato or "traces of handling" during firing. Distinctively, instead of the common desire of most potters to leave traces like finger marks visible in the clay, Fukami strives to leave no indication of human creation. Fukami's works also often feature collaborations with artists and technicians who create specifically designed wood and metal stands for the finished pieces. High-pressure slip-casting is a process typically used industrially for mass production, Fukami's adaptation of the technique for a studio pottery setting is the only example of its kind. He is known to additionally create some wheel-thrown works, in combination with the high-pressure slip-casting techniques, which can be seen in works such as his 2003 piece Chū (Ether).

The distinctive pale-blue qinbai glazing became of fascination of Fukami's and his aesthetic signature. The artist states: "In the simplest terms, to my mind, the beauty of qingbai glaze went beyond whether the form was good or bad. It was just beautiful. At that point [work prior to 1974], it was really a period when I had become more sincere in my work and was truly anguished. But here I had discovered a different world that I could sense without reservation was truly beautiful and realized that I should press forward with it." The technique originates in the 11th-century Song dynasty, in China's Jingdezhen city of Jianxi province, characteristically known for producing clear white porcelain bodies with pale blue glaze. For Fukami, the quality of qingbai glaze symbolizes "the place where the sky and sea meet, the 'something' that is heading out into the ocean's horizon." Fukami's own practice adapts the colored glaze's sense of sharpness with a thinning of the glaze at the piece's edges to reveal a gradient whiteness of the porcelain. Fukami's pieces combine historical techniques with minimalist, spontaneous forms, pushing the medium of porcelain into abstracted and contemporary territory. His work makes a clear break from other Japanese ceramic movements of the mid-twentieth century such as the mingei folk movement promoted by such artists as Hamada Shōji, instead harkening back to dynastic Chinese aesthetics unrelated to his Japanese background. The titles of Fukami's works often express poetic associations with natural phenomena, such as Landscape over the Horizon (Senjō no kei), In the Sky Far Away I (Tenkū Haruka I), and Moment of Silence (Seijaku no toki). Their compositions sometimes evoke rolling ocean waves, architectural objects, or papery curved forms in flight.

Influences

Fukami has cited Italian ceramicist Carlo Zauli (1926–2002) as a major artistic inspiration. Zauli's 1973 traveling solo exhibition in Japan had influenced many Japanese abstract ceramicists. In 1980, Fukami won the Newcomer Prize of Kyoto Prefecture Arts and Crafts Exhibition. As a prize, he was awarded a one-month research trip to Italy during which time he befriended Zauli. Fukami has also mentioned that as a young artist, he was inspired by the Sōdeisha potters, a post-war Japanese avant-garde ceramic movement headed by potter Kazuo Yagi (1918–1979). Fukami describes his connection to these abstract ceramicists as instinctual and intimate, using the Japanese term akogare, or a "yearning for," to describe their influence. Fukami's work, as with many of his artistic inspirations, primarily seeks to declare independence from the preconceptions of ceramic and pottery as craft.

Fukami cites visual and sensual memories and motifs from childhood as influences in his work, including the Tōfukuji Temple roof outlines and views of mountaintops. He refers often to his work's connections to universal sensations and ideas, denying the common culturally-specific associations often ascribed to his work, such as samurai swords and Japanese scabbards. The artist describes a defining moment in his artistic production as an experience of sharp winter winds on an ocean shore: "It was the memory of an encounter I had with a sharp breeze while on the cliff during winter… All the senses in my body felt the pleasure of the strange wind as it stabbed my cheek. This tactile experience is at the heart of my creations." He describes his ceramic forms as abstract in meaning and non-representational, disconnected from Japanese identity in favor of associations with wider human experiences such as viewing landscapes, reading abstract ideas, and interacting with other sculptural artists.

== Museum representation ==
Fukami's work has been presented in the following museums: Ackland Art Museum, Musée Ariana, Art Institute of Chicago, British Museum, Brooklyn Museum of Art, Everson Museum of Art, Hetjens Museum, Museum of Fine Arts, Houston, Indianapolis Museum of Art, Aichi Prefectural Ceramic Museum, Kyoto Municipal Museum of Art, Metropolitan Museum of Art, Musée des Arts Décoratifs, Paris, Sèvres – Cité de la céramique, MIC Faenza International Museum of Ceramics, Buenos Aires Museum of Modern Art, Museum of Art and History (Geneva), Museum of Fine Arts, Boston, Museum of Contemporary Art, Belgrade, National Gallery of Australia, National Museum of Art, Osaka, National Museum of History, Taiwan, National Museum of Modern Art, Kyoto, National Museum of Modern Art, Tokyo, New Orleans Museum of Art, North Carolina Museum of Art, Portland Museum of Art, Rhode Island School of Design Museum, Rijksmuseum, Spencer Museum of Art, St Louis Museum of Art, Suntory Museum of Art, Yale University Art Gallery, Victoria & Albert Museum.

== Public collections ==
Fukami's works have been acquired in nearly 80 public collections, including: the Musée national de céramique-Sèvres; Victoria & Albert Museum; The Metropolitan Museum of Art; Indianapolis Museum of Art; Argentina Museum of Modern Art; Japan House, Argentina; Musée Ariana; Musée d'Art et d'Histoire; The British Museum; Brooklyn Museum of Art; The Everson Museum of Art; MIC Faenza International Museum of Ceramics; French Culture Foundation; Hetjens Museum; International Permanent Collection of Modern Art, Yugoslavia; Musée de design et d'arts appliqués contemporains; The RISD Museum; Museum of Fine Arts, Boston; Newcastle Art Gallery; New Orleans Museum of Art; North Carolina Museum of Art; Portland Art Museum; Saint Louis Art Museum; Spencer Museum of Art; The Art Institute of Chicago; National Museum of History, Taiwan; Yale University Art Gallery; Aichi Prefectural Ceramic Museum; Chazen Museum of Art; Kyoto Municipal Museum of Art; Kyoto Prefectural Library and Archives; Museum of Modern Ceramic Art, Japan; Suntory Museum, Japan; The Japan Foundation, Japan; The Ministry of Foreign Affairs, Japan; National Museum of Modern Art, Tokyo; National Museum of Art, Osaka; Shigaraki Ceramic Cultural Park, Japan; Tokoname City Education Bureau; Tsurui Museum of Art; Minneapolis Institute of Art; Auckland War Memorial Museum; National Gallery of Australia; Ackland Art Museum; The Museum of Fine Arts, Houston; Harvard Art Museum; Museum of Contemporary Art, Belgrade; National Museum of Modern Art, Kyoto; MOA Museum of Art, Japan; Rakusui-tei Museum of Art; French Culture Foundation; Philadelphia Museum of Art; Kyoto State Guest House; Ibaraki Ceramic Art Museum; Musée Tomo; Museum of Modern Ceramic Art, Gifu; Museum of Contemporary Ceramic Art, Shiga; Museum of Kyoto; The Museum of Ceramic Art, Hyogo; Okada Museum of Art; Yanagisawa Collection; National Museum of Scotland; Museo Carlo Zauli; Musée des arts décoratifs; Lotte Reimers-Foundation; Museum of Decorative Arts; Museo de Arte Moderno de Buenos Aires; Smithsonian Museum, Arthur M. Sackler Gallery; Peabody Essex Museum; Burke Collection; Newark Museum; Asian Art Museum of San Francisco; Birmingham Museum of Art.

== Selected awards ==
- 1985 – Grand Prize, Faenza International Ceramic Exhibition
- 1992 – Grand Prize, MOA Mokichi Okada Art
- 1997 – The Kyoto Prefecture Culture Prize, Prize for Artistic Merit
- 2008 – Kyoto City Person of Cultural Merit
- 2012 – Gold Prize, Japan Ceramic Society

== Selected exhibitions ==
1986

- 44th International Competition of Ceramic Art – Faenza, Italy
- Hetjens Museum – Düsseldorf, Germany

1987

- Galerie Maghi Bettini – Amsterdam, the Netherlands
- Galerie Maya Behn – Zurich, Switzerland
- Musée des Arts Decoratifs de la Ville de Lausanne, Switzerland

1993

- "Modern Japanese Ceramics in American Collections" – Japan Society, New York / New Orleans Museum of Art / Honolulu Academy of Art, USA

1995

- "Japanese Studio Craft: Tradition and Avant-garde" – Victoria & Albert Museum, London, UK

2002

- Garth Clark Gallery, New York, USA

2003

- "Japan–Ceramics and Photography: Tradition and Today," Deichtorhallen, Hamburg, Germany
- The Ruth and Sherman Lee Institute for Japanese Art at The Clark Center, Hanford, USA

2005

- Faenza International Ceramics Museum, Italy

2006

- "Contemporary Clay: Japanese Ceramics for the New Century" – Japan Society Gallery, New York USA
- "Tōji: Avant-Garde et Tradition de la Ceramique Japonaise" – Musée national de céramique-Sèvres, France

2008

- "The Dauer Collection, California State University" – University Library Gallery, USA

2011

- "Purity of Form" – The Clark Center for Japanese Art and Culture, Hanford, USA
- "Modern Celadon: Ambient Green Flow – the Emergence and Rise of East Asian Celadon" – New Taipei City Yingge Ceramic Museum, Taiwan

2012

- Vallauris Ceramics Biennale, France

2013

- TEFAF Maastricht, The Netherlands
- "A Distant View: The Porcelain Sculpture of Sueharu Fukami" – Garden Pavilion, Portland Japanese Garden, USA

2014

- "Fukami Sueharu Porcelain Sculptures" – Eric Thomsen Japanese Art, New York, USA
- Art Stage Singapore, Singapore
- Art Miami, USA
- "Celadon Now: Techniques and Beauty Handed Down from Southern Song to Today" – National Museum of Modern Art, Tokyo / The Museum of Ceramic Art, Hyogo, Japan

2016

- Spring Masters, New York, USA
- EAF Monaco, Monaco

2017

- TEFAF New York Spring, USA
- "The Greatest Story Ever Told: The Collection Curated by Ryan Gander" – National Museum of Art, Osaka

2019

- West Bund Art and Design, Shanghai, China
- "Silhouettes of Tomorrow," Yufuku Gallery, London, UK
- "Kichizaemon X I Fukami Sueharu x Kichizaemon XV" – Raku Jikinyu, Sagawa Art Museum, Sagawa, Japan

2020

- "Reopening Celebration I ART in LIFE, LIFE and BEAUTY" – Suntory Museum of Art, Tokyo, Japan
- "Opening Ceremony" – A Lighthouse called Kanata, Tokyo, Japan

2021

- "The Secret Show, A Lighthouse called Kanata, Tokyo, Japan
- "All our stories are incomplete / colours of the imagination" – Tokyo Opera City Art Gallery
- The Armory Show, New York, USA
- ART 021, Shanghai Contemporary Art Fair, China
- Untitled Art Miami Beach, USA

2022

- "Pure Form: Japanese Sculptural Ceramics" – Art Gallery of South Australia, Adelaide, Australia
- "A Lighthouse called Kanata New York Pop-Up" – New York, USA
- Masterpiece London, UK
