= Fronte Nuovo delle Arti =

Artistic movement

Fronte Nuovo delle Arti was an Italian artistic movement active in Venice, Rome and Milan in the years following WWII (1946 to 1950). It is considered to be part of the post-cubism movement.

== History ==
"Fronte Nuovo delle Arti" was founded in September–October 1946 with the name New Italian Artistic Secession (Italian: Nuova Secessione Artistica Italiana). The first manifesto was published on 1 October 1946 in Venice. It was written by Giuseppe Marchiori and signed by Emilio Vedova, Renato Birolli, Ennio Morlotti, Armando Pizzinato, Giuseppe Santomaso, Alberto Viani, Bruno Cassinari, Renato Guttuso, Leoncillo Leonardi, and Carlo Levi. Later on, Guttuso proposed to change the name of the movement to Fronte Nuovo delle Arti.

The reasoning for this group of artists and critics to develop the ideas leading to the formation of the Fronte was to go beyond the positions of the movement Novecento italiano, who were deemed as outdated in light of the most recent artistic developments in Europe.

Fronte Nuovo delle Arti had a number of exhibitions in Italy but it disbanded after an intense internal debate about abstraction and realism. Pizzinato and Guttuso rejected abstractionism and announced their decision to quit. The movement was officially dissolved on 3 September 1950 in Venice.

== Bibliography ==
- Adrian R. Duran. "Paintings, Politics and the New Front of Cold War in Italy". Ashgate Publishing, 2014. ISBN 978-1-4094-2691-2
- Flaminio Gualdoni, "Arte in Italia 1943 - 1999", Neri Pozza Editore, Vicenza, 2000, ISBN 88-7305-733-0 (in Italian)
- Enrico Crispolti, in "Il Fronte Nuovo delle Arti. Nascita di una avanguardia", Neri Pozza Editore, Vicenza, 1997, ISBN 88-7305-623-7 (in Italian)
- Giuseppe Marchiori, "Il Fronte Nuovo delle Arti", Giorgio Tacchini Editore, Vercelli, 1978 (in Italian)
