= Alberto Ziveri =

Italian painter (1908–1990)

- Born: 1908; Rome, Kingdom of Italy
- Died: 1990 (aged 81–82); Rome, Italy
- Education: Scuola Romana
- Known for: Painting
- Notable work: The Notturni (Nocturnes) Series Composizione (Composition, 1933); Piazza Navona (1943) Postriboli (Brothels, 1945) The Fermate di tram (Tram stops) Series
- Movement: Contemporary
- Awards: IV Premio Quadriennale di Roma; Premio Viareggio-Rèpaci

Alberto Ziveri (1908–1990) was an Italian painter belonging to the modern movement of the Scuola Romana ("Roman School"). He is known for his urban landscapes and realist narrative scenes. His use of chiaroscuro in paintings such as Postribolo (1945) recalls the Settecento style.

== Awards ==
- IV Premio Quadriennale di Roma, 1943
- Premio Viareggio-Rèpaci, 1989

== See also ==
- Scuola Romana
- Expressionism
- Guglielmo Janni

== Exhibitions ==
- XXVIII Biennale di Venezia, 1956
- Personale Ziveri, 1964, Galleria La Nuova Pesa, Rome, 1964
- Ziveri: Anthologic Collection, Gallery of Rome, 1984

== Bibliography ==
- M. Fagiolo, Alberto Ziveri, Turin, 1988
- Suola Romana a Torino 1986-1989, ed. by M. Fagiolo & G. Audoli, Turin, 1989
- M. Fagiolo, F. Morelli, Ziveri, catalogue, Florence, 1989
- V. Rivosecchi, Alberto Ziveri. Taccuini di viaggio, Rome, 1990
- V. Rivosecchi, Piero della Francesca e il Novecento, catalogue by di M.M. Lamberti & M. Fagiolo, Venice, 1991, pp. 174 –177
- Roma sotto le stelle (Rome under the stars), catalogue by N. Vespignani, M. Fagiolo, V. Rivosecchi, I. Montesi, Rome, 1994
- General catalogue of the Galleria comunale d'arte moderna e contemporanea, Rome, ed. by G. Bonasegale, Rome, 1995
