= Dino Basaldella =

Italian sculptor and painter

Dino Aldo Basaldella (Udine, 26 April 1909 – Udine, 7 January 1977) was an Italian sculptor and painter.

== Biography ==
Dino had two brothers, Mirko and Afro who also became artists. Dino studied in Venice and Florence. By the 1930s, he was a member of the modernist artists in the Friuli region. He exhibited his work in Rome as early as 1935, and in 1960 at the gallery La Tartaruga. His work was exhibited for the first time at the Venice Biennial in 1936, and again in 1964. In 1961, his work was on display in various places in the USA: at the Princeton University Art Museum and the Carnegie Institute in Pittsburgh; the art gallery of Pennsylvania State University; and he had a solo exhibition at the Catherine Viviano Gallery in New York.

In the late 1960s and the early 1970s, he created the Resistance memorial in Udine (1968–1970) and the monumental sculpture in front of the Kennedy Institute in the town of Pordenone (1973–1974). From 1942 to 1947, he taught sculpture at the Art Lyceum (Liceo Artistico) and the Academy of Fine Arts (Accademia di Belle Arti) in Venice; from 1948 to 1969 at the Art Institutes (Istituto d'Arte) in Gorizia and Udine; and from 1970 to 1975 at the Brera Academy in Milan. He died in Udine.
