= Guglielmo Janni =

Italian painter (1892–1958)

- Born: 1892; Rome, Italy
- Died: 1958 (aged 65–66); Rome, Italy
- Education: Scuola Romana
- Known for: Painting, Biography
- Notable work: Endimione (1931) Figura d'aprile Giovani atleti Lo specchio Figura di Balletto
- Movement: Contemporary

Guglielmo Janni (1892–1958) was an Italian painter belonging to the modern movement of the Scuola romana (Roman School).

== Biography ==
Son of a renowned Roman family – his father Giuseppe was a lawyer and his mother Teresa Belli was the niece of famous Italian poet Giuseppe Gioachino Belli – Janni was to be strongly influenced by his inherited literary background. He graduated at law in 1914 and, just after World War I, he attended an Art Nouveau decorative course at the Academy of Fine Arts in Rome, while studying philosophy and literature on his own.

In 1921, he exhibited at the 1st Biennale of Rome and around 1924 he was called to decorate the Headquarters of the Banca d'Italia, where he painted a mural on the history of Italian coinage. Between 1926 and 1927 he collaborated successively with the Ministry of the Interior and Ministry of Justice, with the Istituto Nazionale delle Assicurazioni and with Montecatini Terme. During this period (1923–1928), his main themes involved religious motifs and he exhibited his work at the II Biennale of Rome; at the Franciscan Art Contest of Milan; at the Art Show of the National Artists Association of Florence. Janni also became a lifelong friend of painter Alberto Ziveri.

In 1928, Janni painted a fresco in the votive chapel of St. Bartholomew ("Monument to the Fallen") at Busseto (Parma), with influences from Piero della Francesca. He was congratulated by art critic Roberto Longhi, who praised Janni's literary style of painting – an appropriate evaluation, as the artist's figurative work had acquired a "vocation to myth" that will be reflected in all his subsequent work: he will convey it through a tormented and sensual contemplation of the virile form, often concealed by an ambiguous and mundane veil: his "Endymion" of 1931 confirms this fully.

Giuseppe Ungaretti presented in a relevant catalogue, Janni's first personal exhibition at the Galleria della Cometa, in Rome in 1936, where many important paintings were displayed, among which: Figura d'aprile, Giovani atleti, Lo specchio, Figura di Balletto. Highly acclaimed by public and art critics, he organised again at the same Gallery a second personal exhibition and, in 1936, he attended the Biennale di Venezia and displayed three paintings at the Modern Italian Art Expo of Budapest.

After a visit to the Universal Exposition of Paris with Alberto Ziveri in 1937, Janni suffered an existential crisis and abandoned painting completely. He then decided to dedicate the rest of his life to studying, editing and cataloguing his grandfather Belli's unpublished writings, stored in the family library. Janni died while doing this labouring work, which included a monumental biographical opus on Belli's life and poetry, in ten volumes.

== See also ==
- Scuola Romana
- Alberto Ziveri
- Giuseppe Ungaretti
- Expressionism
- Corrente di Vita
- Novecento Italiano
- Valori plastici

== Bibliography ==
- R. Lucchese, Guglielmo Janni, Rome 1972, with essays by G. Ungaretti, L. de Libero & A. Ziveri
- M. Fagiolo Dell'Arco, Janni, catalogue by Accademia Nazionale di San Luca, Rome 1986, with bibliography
- M. Fagiolo Dell'Arco, Scuola Romana: pittura e scultura a Roma dal 1919 al 1943, Rome, 1986
- M. Fagiolo Dell'Arco, Valerio Rivosecchi, Emily Braun, Scuola Romana. Artisti tra le due guerre, Milan, 1988
- Scuola romana, catalogue by M.Fagiolo & V.Rivosecchi, with intro by F.R. Morelli, Milan 1988
- V.Rivosecchi, in Piero della Francesca e la pittura del Novecento, catalogue by di M.Fagiolo & M.Lamberti, Venezia 1991
- F. Morelli, "Guglielmo Janni", in La pittura Italiana, il Novecento, Ed. Electa.
- G. Castelfranco, D. Durbe, La Scuola romana dal 1930 al 1945, Rome, 1960
- Roma sotto le stelle ("Rome under the stars"), catalogue by N. Vespignani, M. Fagiolo, V. Rivosecchi, eds., Rome 1994
- General Catalogue of Galleria comunale d'arte moderna e contemporanea, ed. by G. Bonasegale, Rome 1995
