= Emilio Vedova =

Italian painter (1919–2006)

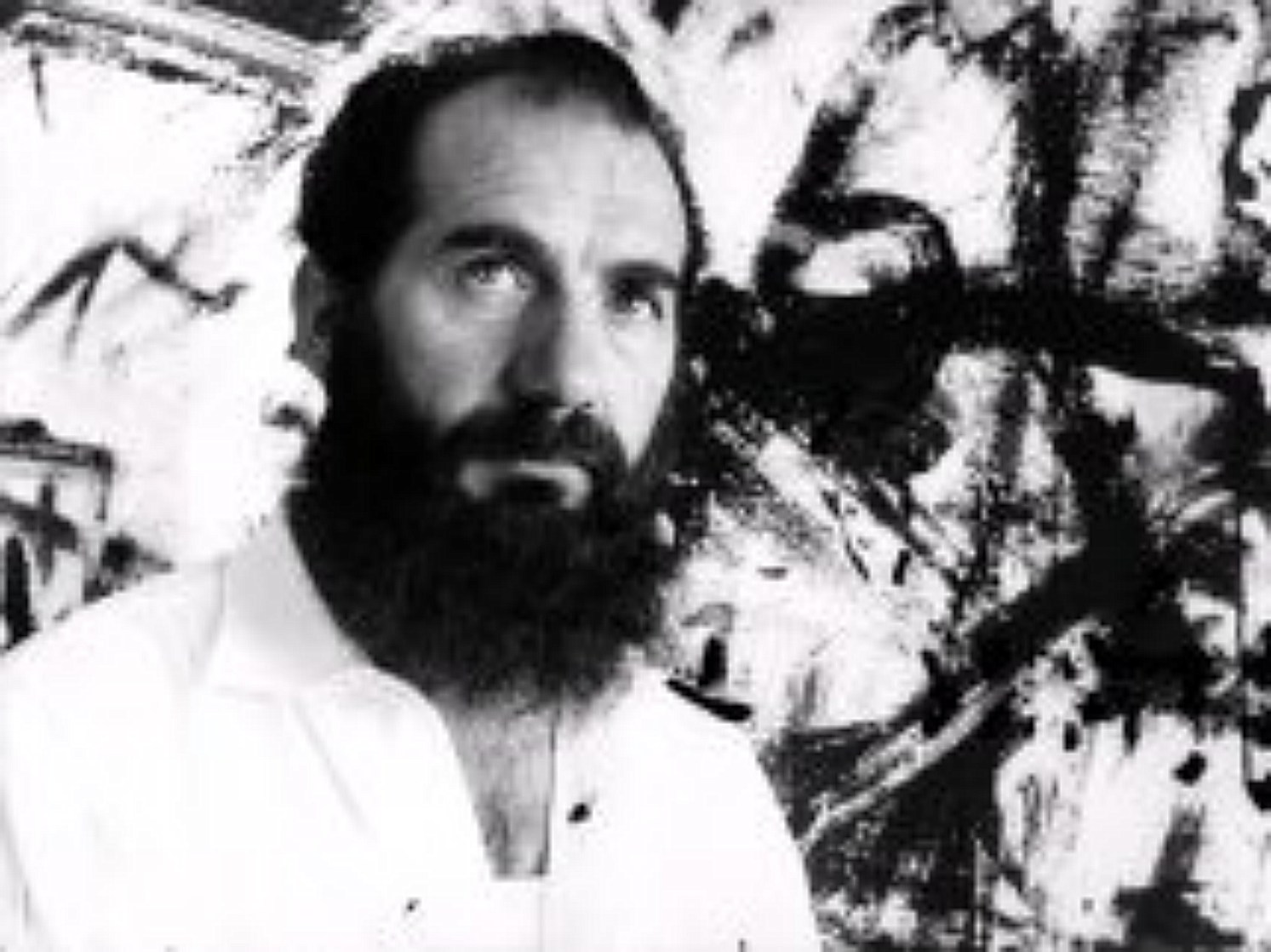
- Emilio Vedova
- Born: 9 August 1919; Venice, Veneto, Kingdom of Italy
- Died: 25 October 2006 (aged 87)
- Education: self-taught
- Movement: Beyond Guernica, Gruppo degli Otto, Arte Informale
- Awards: Cavaliere di Gran Croce della Repubblica Italiana

Emilio Vedova (9 August 1919 – 25 October 2006) was a modern Italian painter. He is considered one of the most important artists to emerge from Italy's artistic scene in the post-World War II.

== Early life ==
Vedova was born in Venice into a working-class family. His artisan roots came from his house-painting father. He was the third child out of seven. Emilio began working at a young age, primarily in a factory. Later he got a job in a photography and restoration studio.

== Career ==
He was primarily a self-taught artist aside from a few night classes. After an initial formative experience within Expressionism, he joined the group "Corrente" (1942–1943), during the second world war, which included other artists such as Renato Guttuso and Renato Birolli. He recorded his experience in his drawings. During this time he also participated in the Italian resistance movement. Vedova returned to Venice towards the end of the war and played a key role in the post-war Italian art movement, which was connecting to the European avant-garde. His work became much more abstract. His images represented the apprehension of the time, with his geometric shapes and color palette. In 1946 he co-signed the manifesto "Beyond Guernica" which included several Italian artists who were to become famous. In 1947 Vedova founded Fronte Nuovo delle Arti.

In 1951, Vedova exhibited his first solo show in the United States at the Catherine Viviano Gallery located in New York. This show was where he began to attract big name collectors, such as Peggy Guggenheim. In 1952 he became a member of the influential and more avant garde Gruppo degli Otto (Afro, Birolli, Corpora, Santomaso, Morlotti, Vedova, Moreni, and Turcato), organized by the critic Lionello Venturi, which exhibited at the Venice Biennial. This show is known to have begun the art movement recognized as Arte Informale. His work exerted a significant influence on the Arte Povera group.

He later established a fruitful cooperation with composer Luigi Nono, designing sets and costumes for the opera Intolleranza 1960. In 1984 he designed a highly original light setting for Nono's opera Prometeo at La Fenice. Nono dedicated his first work for magnetic tape Omaggio a Emilio Vedova (1960) to Vedova.

Vedova had a number of gallery and museum exhibitions, at places like the Galleria Nazionale d'Arte Moderna in Rome and the Peggy Guggenheim Collection in Venice. His work has proven to be very successful in auctions.

Vedova spent most of his life in Venice, where he taught at the Accademia di Belle Arti.

== Awards ==
Vedova's offerings to art were acknowledged through awards and solo shows.

- In 1951 at the first São Paulo Biennial, he was awarded the prize for young painters.
- In 1956 he won a Guggenheim International award.
- In 1960 at the Venice Biennale, he received the Grand Prize for painting.
