= Mirko Basaldella =

Italian sculptor (1910-1969)

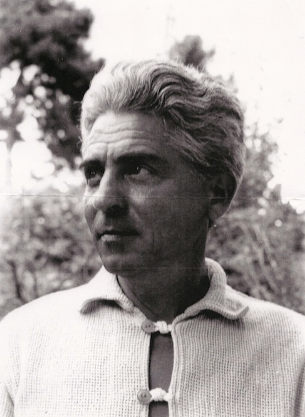
- Born: September 28, 1910; Udine, Italy
- Died: November 24, 1969 (aged 59); Cambridge, Massachusetts
- Occupations: Sculptor and painter
- Years active: 1928–1960s

Mirko Basaldella (September 28, 1910 – November 24, 1969) was an Italian sculptor and painter.

== Early life and education ==
Mirko was born in Udine, Italy on September 28, 1910, the second of three brothers (Dino was the eldest, and Afro the youngest). He grew up in a family of artists: his father Leo (1886–1918) was a painter and decorator, and since youth Mirko and his brothers showed a precocious artistic talent. Mirko studied at the Accademia di Belle Arti di Venezia and at the Accademia di Belle Arti di Firenze; in 1928, he first exhibited his work in Udine, alongside the paintings of his two brothers. Dino, Mirko and Afro later attended the Institute of Applied Arts in Monza, where they studied under the sculptor Arturo Martini.

== Career ==
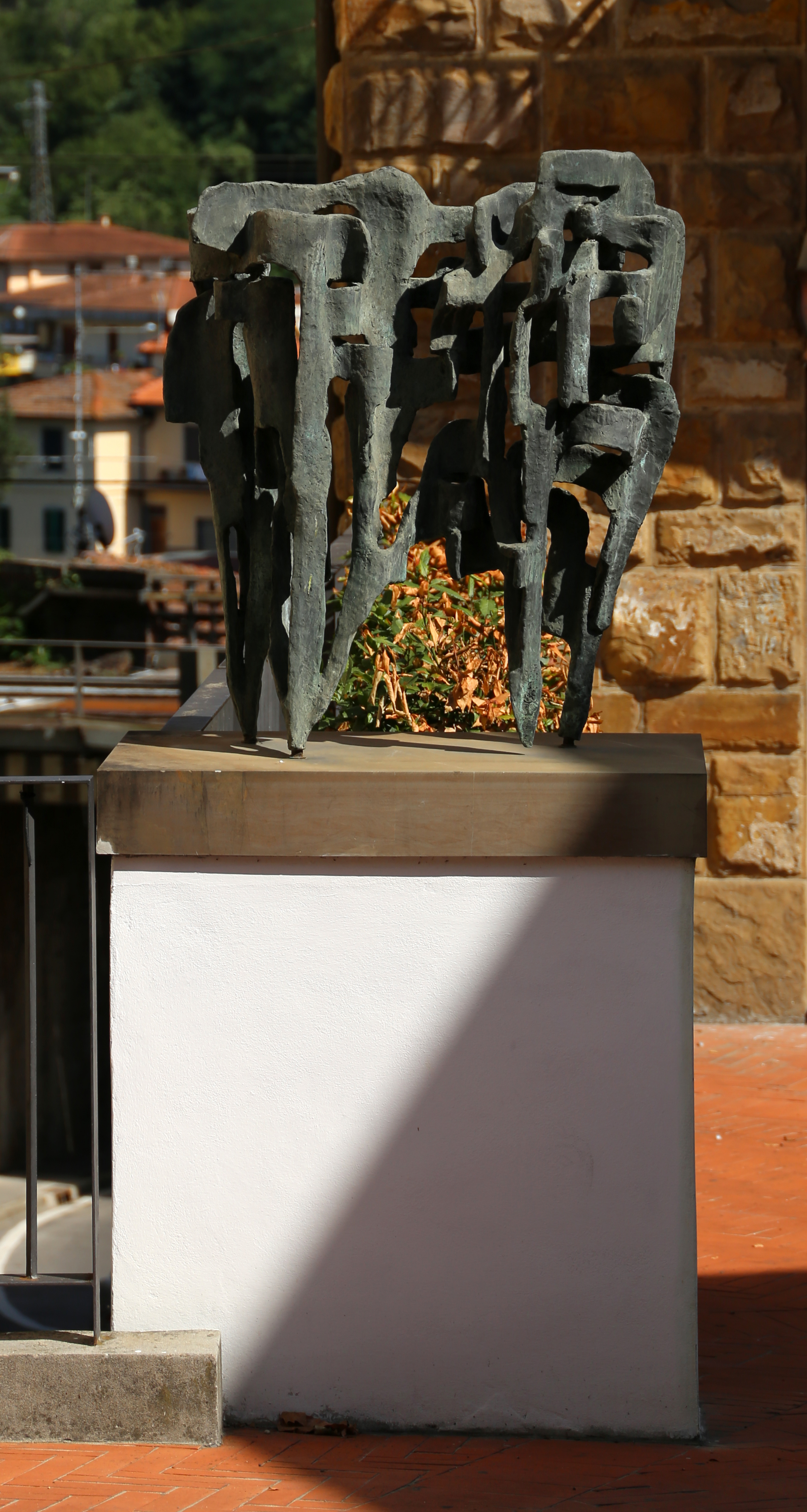
Chimera, 1954

In 1934, Mirko moved to Rome, where he held his first solo exhibition in 1936 at the Galleria della Cometa. In the same year he exhibited his work at the Venice Biennale, together with other artists associated with the so-called Scuola Romana (including Giuseppe Capogrossi, Alberto Ziveri, Guglielmo Janni and Renato Guttuso).

In 1955, Mirko won the first prize for sculpture at the São Paulo Art Biennial. In 1957, he moved to Cambridge, Massachusetts, where Josep Lluís Sert appointed him to direct the Design Workshop at Harvard University; Mirko stayed there until 1963, when he joined Eduard Sekler and Robert Gardner in the newly created Department of Visual and Environmental Studies. In 1962, he was elected a member of the American Academy of Arts and Sciences.

== Death and legacy ==
He died in Cambridge on November 24, 1969.
