= Afro Basaldella =

Italian painter (1912–1976)

- Born: March 4, 1912; Udine, Italy
- Died: July 24, 1976 (aged 64); Zurich, Switzerland
- Other name: Afro
- Occupations: Painter and educator
- Years active: 1930-1970s

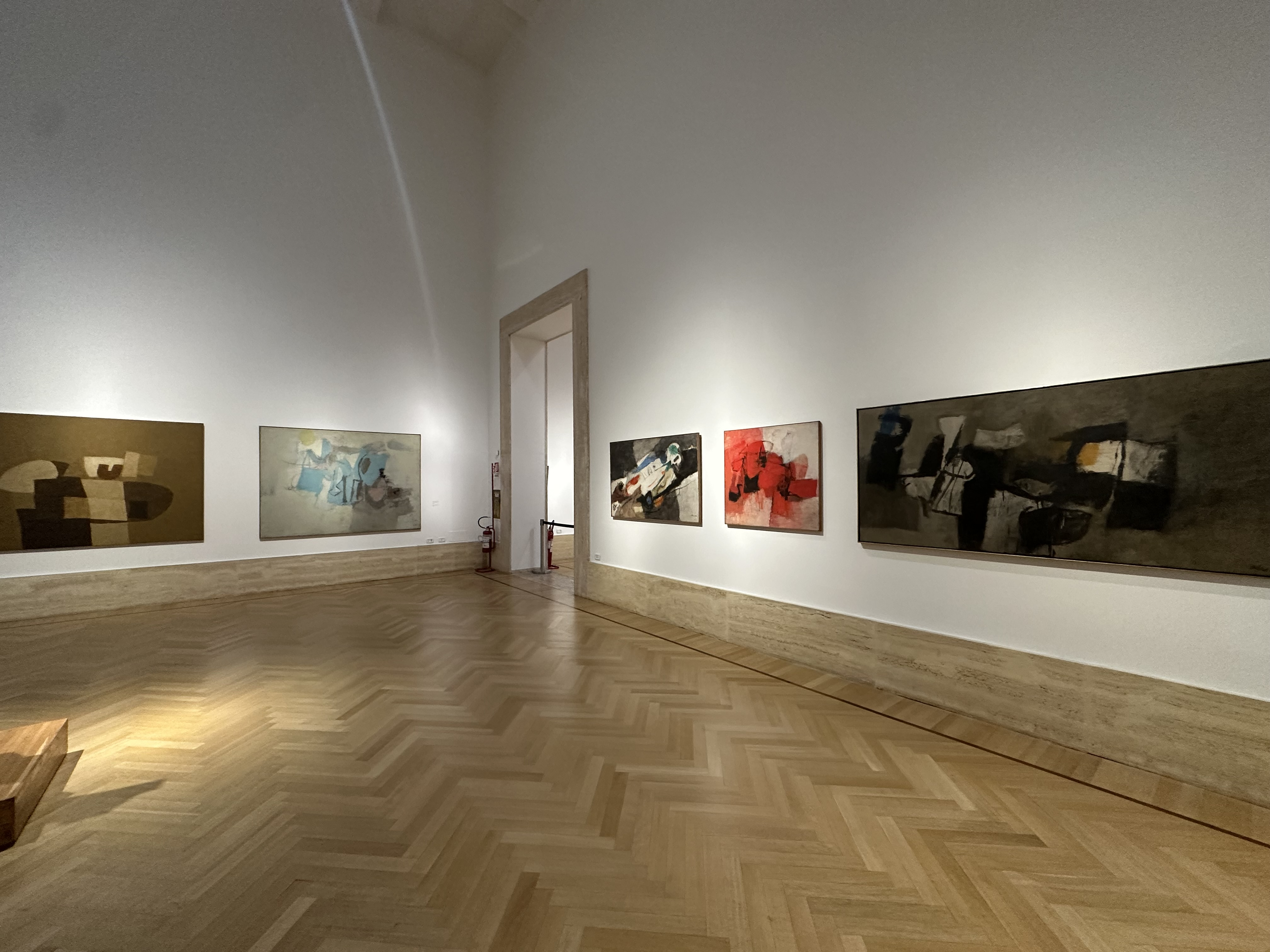

Afro Libio Basaldella (March 4, 1912 – July 24, 1976) was one of the most important Italian painters in the post-World War II period. He began as a member of the Scuola Romana, and then embracing [informal] [abstraction], worked and had great international success together with Alberto Burri and Lucio Fontana. He was generally known by the single name, "Afro".

== Early life and education ==
Born on March 4, 1912, in Udine, Italy. Afro first showed his work when he was sixteen, alongside the paintings of his artist brothers, Dino and Mirko. Two years later he and Dino won a scholarship to study art in Rome, under a stipend from the Marangoni Arts Foundation in Udine.

== Career ==
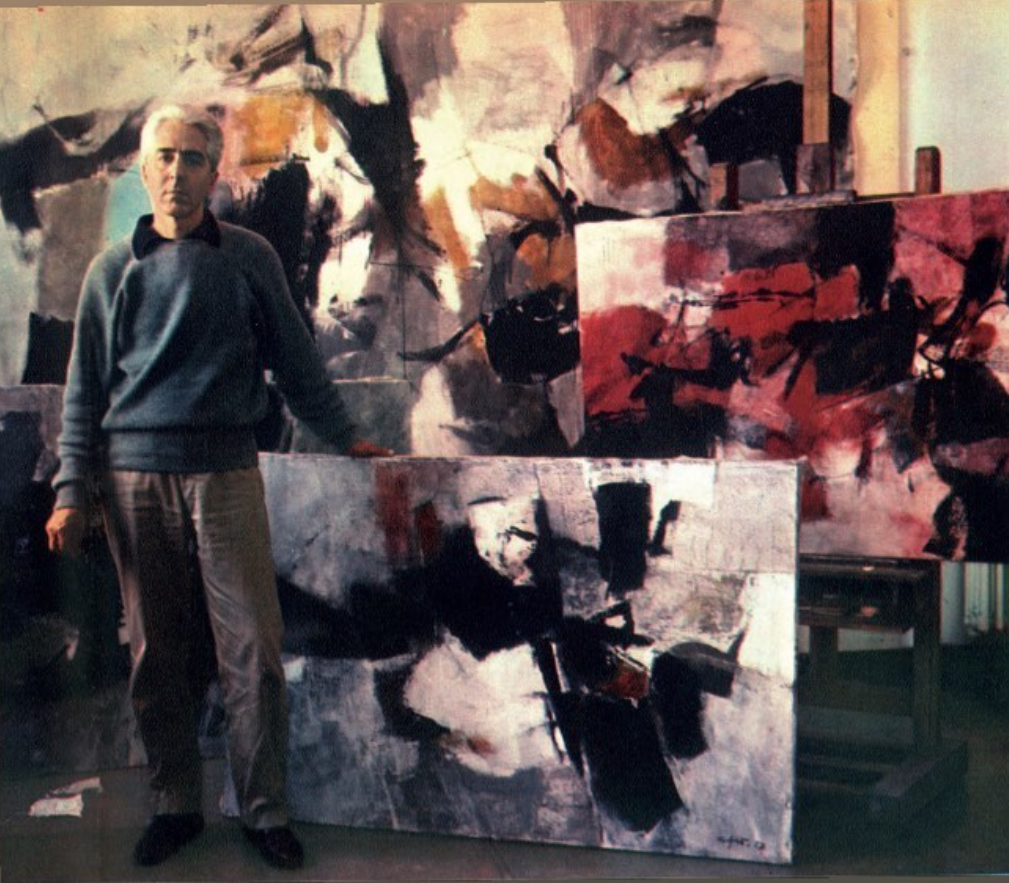

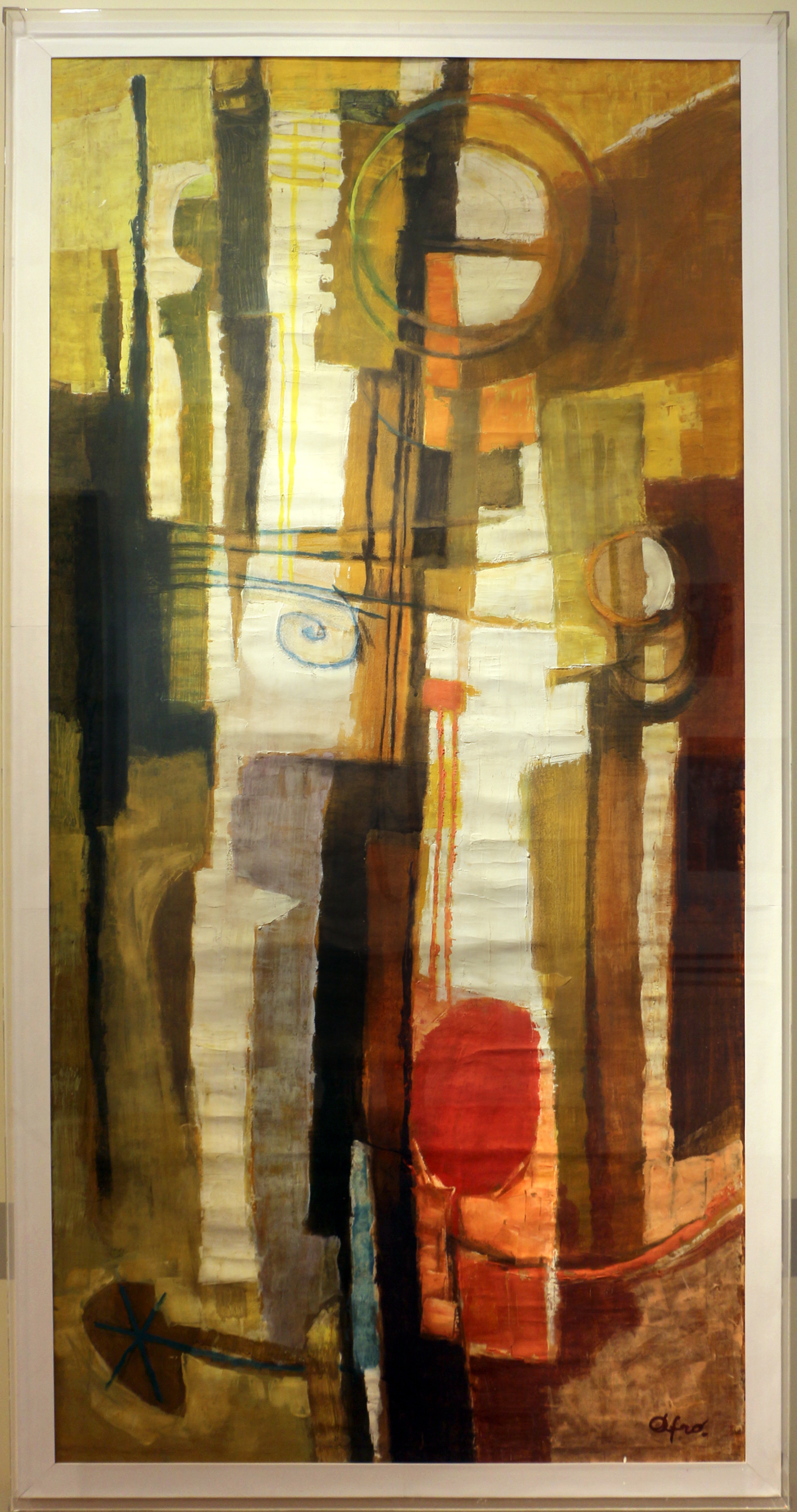
Bozzetto di Afro, 1955

By 1933 he was exhibiting, along with fellow Friulians Bosisio, Pittino e Taiuti, at the Galleria del Milione in Milan. In 1935 he participated in the Rome Quadriennale art exhibition, and he showed his work several times at the Venice Biennale. Afro followed the School of Rome, creating murals. In 1936, he received a commission to paint for the Udine opera house. In 1937, collaborating with Corrado Cagli, he worked on large murals for the World Exhibition held in Paris.

Afro's first personal exhibition was held in 1937 at the Galleria del Cometa in Rome. He traveled to the island of Rhodes to paint frescoes for the Hôtel des Roses. In 1941, he was awarded a lectureship for mosaic painting at the Venetian Academy of Fine Arts. By the late 1930s, Afro's painting began a migration from a crisp realist style to increasingly cubist, expressionistic, and abstract painting. After the war, his paintings, retain figurative titles, but reflect increasing neo-cubist patches, influenced by his exposure to Arshile Gorky in New York.

In 1950, he travelled to New York City, and began a twenty-year collaboration with the Catherine Viviano Gallery. Through Viviano, Afro met the collector Stanley Seeger and American artist Joseph Glasco who later let him stay in his Taos home.

Afro was shown in an exhibition called The New Decade: 22 European Painters and Sculptors, which toured the United States. His work was included at documenta 1 in Kassel, Germany. Afro aligns with Mattia Moreni, Antonio Corpora, Ennio Morlotti, Renato Birolli, Giuseppe Santomaso, Giulio Turcato, and Emilio Vedova, previous members of the "Fronte nuovo delle Arti", together they form the "Gruppo degli Otto" (Group of Eight) also known as "Otto Pittori Italiani" (The Italian Eight).

By the mid-1950s Afro's art was obtaining worldwide reputation, and he received the honor of Best Italian Artist at the 1956 Venice Biennale.

In 1957, he was recruited by Leon Kirchner to teach for eight months at Mills College in Oakland, California. While artist-in-residence at the school he made a mural for the UNESCO headquarters in Paris and was included amongst works by Appel, Arp, Calder, Matta, Miró, Picasso and Tamayo. It was titled The Garden of Hope, a large scale minimalist painting in many shades of brown.

Afro continued to show his work internationally. He was invited to the second documenta, and held exhibitions at MIT and numerous European museums. He won first prize at the Carnegie Triennial in Pittsburgh and the Italian prize at the Solomon R. Guggenheim Museum in New York. The Guggenheim bought his 1957 painting Night Flight. In 1961, Guggenheim curator James Johnson Sweeney published a monograph on his work, where he wrote: "His color is sensuous, warm—never cold; fluid, not structural; free-edged, never sharply contoured. Light and color, shadow and shape achieve a suggested space effect through their ordering and flood it with the glories of his great predecessors: this festive spirit, this celebration of light and life—of life through light".

In 1965, he taught at New College of Florida in Sarasota, Florida in the new art department.

In 1968, he was appointed professor at the Accademia di Belle Arti in Florence; he had to leave the post in 1971 for health reasons.

== Death and legacy ==
Afro died on 24 July 1976 in Zürich.

In 1978 the Galleria Nazionale d'Arte Moderna in Rome paid him homage in the form of a major retrospective.

In 1992 a complete exhibition was held in Milan at Palazzo Reale.

The Catalogue Raisonné of Afro was presented in November 1997 at the American Academy in Rome and in 1998 at the Guggenheim Foundation in Venice.

His work was included in the 1994 exhibition, The Italian Metamorphosis, 1943-1968 at the Solomon R. Guggenheim Museum.

== Publications ==
- Sweeney, James johnson (1961). Afro (Catalogue).
- Brandi, Cesare (1963). Afro (Exhibition Catalogue). Catherine Viviano Gallery.
- Crispolti, Enrico (1987). Dino, Mirko, Afro Basaldella (in Italian). Milan, Italy: Gabriele Mazzotta Editore. ISBN 978-8820207519.
- Caramel, Luciano (1989). Afro, l'itinerario astratto. Opere 1948-1975 (Exhibition Catalog) (in Italian). Milan, Italy: Gabriele Mazzotta Editore / Galleria dello Scudo, Verona. ISBN 88-202-0900-4.
- Graziani, Mario (1997). Catalogo Generale Ragionato dai Documenti dell'Archivio Afro (Exhibition Catalogue) (in Italian). Curated by Mario Graziani, Preface by Isabella Reale. Rome: DataArs Scaletta, Galleria La Scaletta.
- Drudi, Barbara (2012). Afro, Dal progetto all'opera (Exhibition Catalog) (in Italian). Gli Ori, Museo Carlo Bilotti. ISBN 978-8873364931.
