= Antonio Corpora =

Italian painter

- Born: 15 August 1909; Tunis, French Tunisia
- Died: 6 September 2004 (aged 95); Rome, Italy
- Movement: Tachisme Fronte Nuovo delle Arti

Antonio Corpora (15 August 1909 – 6 September 2004) was an Italian painter who followed the Tachisme style of Abstract art.

Corpora was born in Tunis on 15 August 1909 to Sicilian parents. He trained at the Tunis Institute of Fine Arts under the mentorship of Armand Vergeaud. In 1930, Corpora moved to Paris, eventually settling in Rome in 1939. In Rome, Corpora joined the Fronte Nuovo delle Arti, a post-cubist Italian art movement.

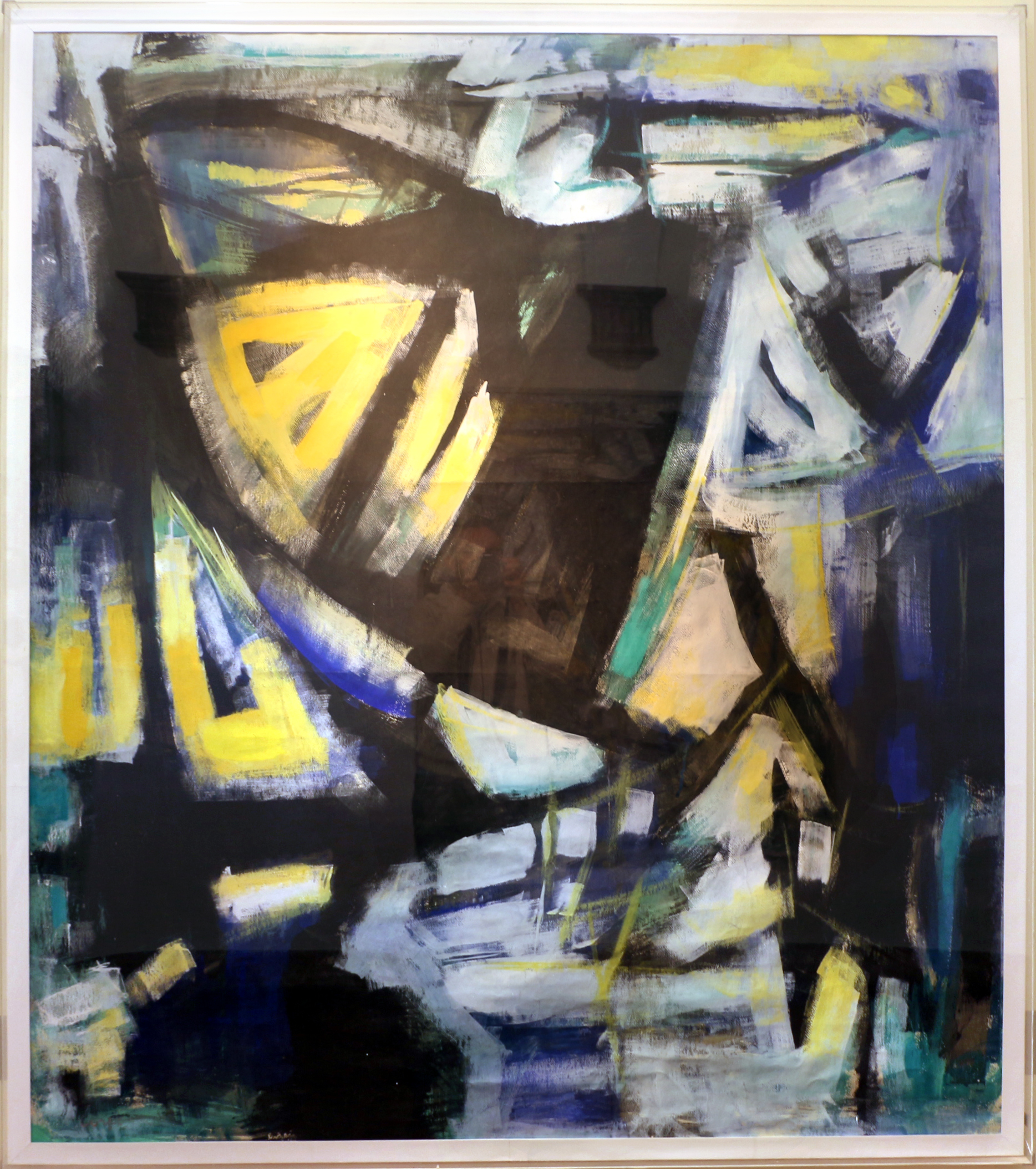
Untitled (1957) by Corpora

In the 1930s, Corpora's style was abstract and geometric, heavily influenced by Cubism and Fauvism. His work later shifted more towards abstract expressionism and Tachisme.

Corpora exhibited his work at the Venice Biennale four times, including a solo show in 1960.

Corpora died in Rome on 6 September 2004 at the age of 95.
