= Renato Birolli =

Italian painter (1905–1959)

Renato Birolli (10 December 1905 – 3 May 1959) was an Italian painter.

== Biography ==
Birolli was born at Verona to a family of industrial workers. In 1923 he moved to Milan where he formed an avant-gardist group with artists such as Renato Guttuso, Giacomo Manzù and Aligi Sassu. In 1937 he was a member of the artistical movement Corrente di Vita. In the same year, he was arrested by the Fascist government for opposing the regime. He subsequently cast painting aside to devote himself to supporting Communist causes and, later, the partisan resistance.

After World War II, in 1947, Birolli moved to Paris. Here his painting style changed under the influence of Henri Matisse and Pablo Picasso, moving first to a post-Cubist position and then to a somehow abstract form of lyrism.

He died suddenly in Milan in 1959.

His son Zeno Birolli (1939–2014) was an art critic and historian.
