= Ennio Morlotti =

Italian painter

Ennio Morlotti (21 September 1910 – 15 December 1992) was an Italian painter of the Corrente de Vita movement started in Milan as a counterpoint to nationalistic Futurism and the Novecento Italiano movements. His figures show an affinity to the geometry of Cezanne and Matisse, but later works introduce elements of abstraction.

== Biography ==
Morlotti was born in Lecco in Lombardy. His early life was difficult and impoverished. He studied at the Accademia di Belle Arti of Florence from 1936 to 1937. He would mainly paint landscapes. He then traveled to Paris for a year, and returned in 1939 to Milan, where he briefly studied at the Brera Academy.

After the war, he returned to Paris in 1947 and participated in the Fronte Nuovo delle Arti. He lived mostly in Milan, occasionally travelling to Liguria. He died in Milan.
