= Ca' Pesaro =

Coordinates: 45.440381°N 12.331145°E

Ca' Pesaro – International Gallery of Modern Art
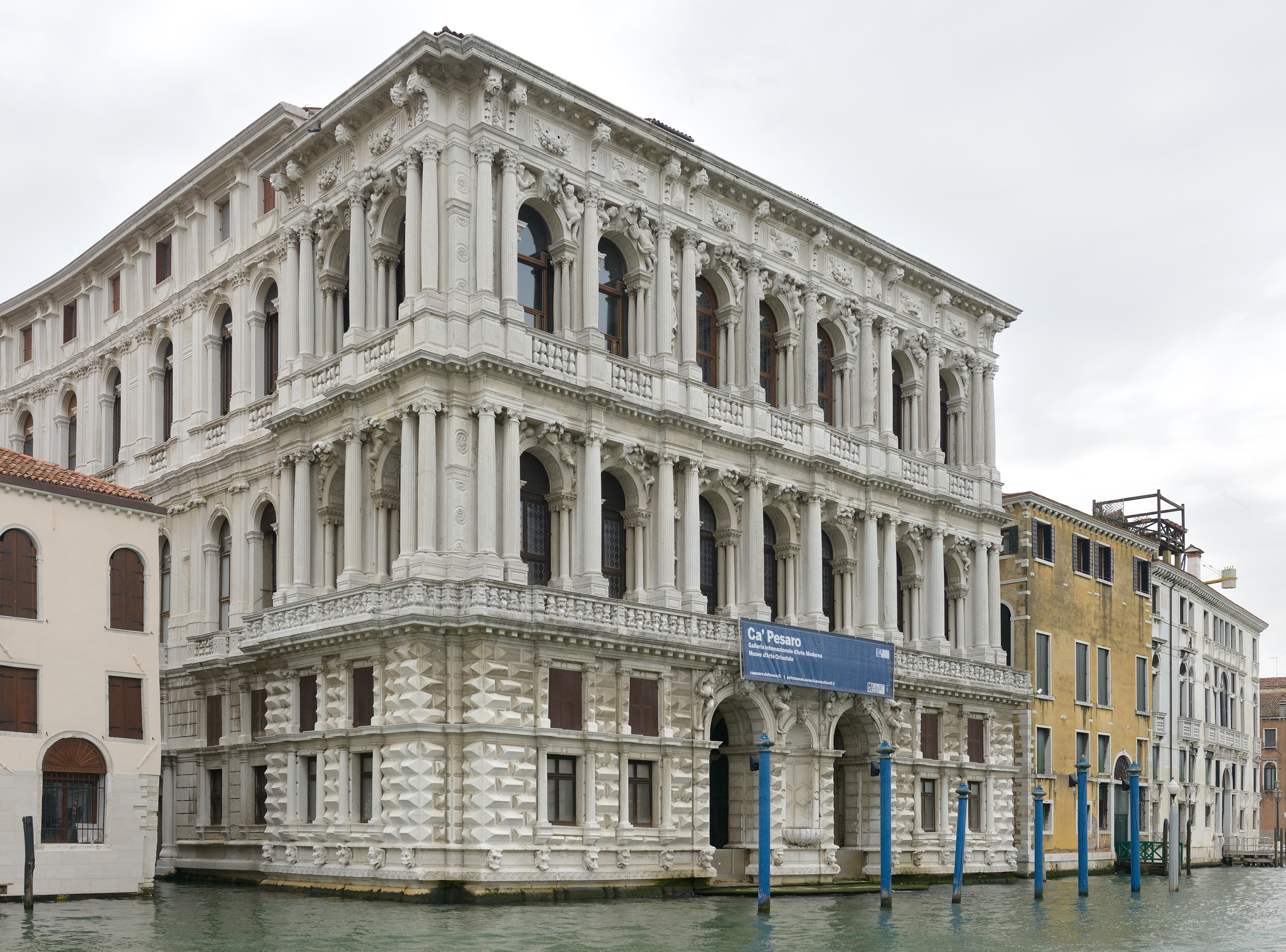
- Facade on the Grand Canal
- Click on the map for a fullscreen view
- Established: 1902
- Location: Santa Croce 2076, 30135 Venice, Italy
- Type: Art museum, Historic site
- Director: Silvio Fuso
- Website: capesaro.visitmuve.it

Ca' Pesaro is a Baroque marble palace turned art museum, facing the Grand Canal of Venice, Italy. Today it is one of the 11 museums run by the Fondazione Musei Civici di Venezia system.

The building was originally designed by Baldassarre Longhena in the mid-17th century, the construction was completed by Gian Antonio Gaspari in 1710. As at Longhena's Ca' Rezzonico, a double order of colossal columns and colonnettes flanking arch-headed windows, reinterpreting a motif of Jacopo Sansovino, Longhena creates the impression of double loggias extending across the main Grand Canal frontage, above a boldly rusticated basement.

== The building ==
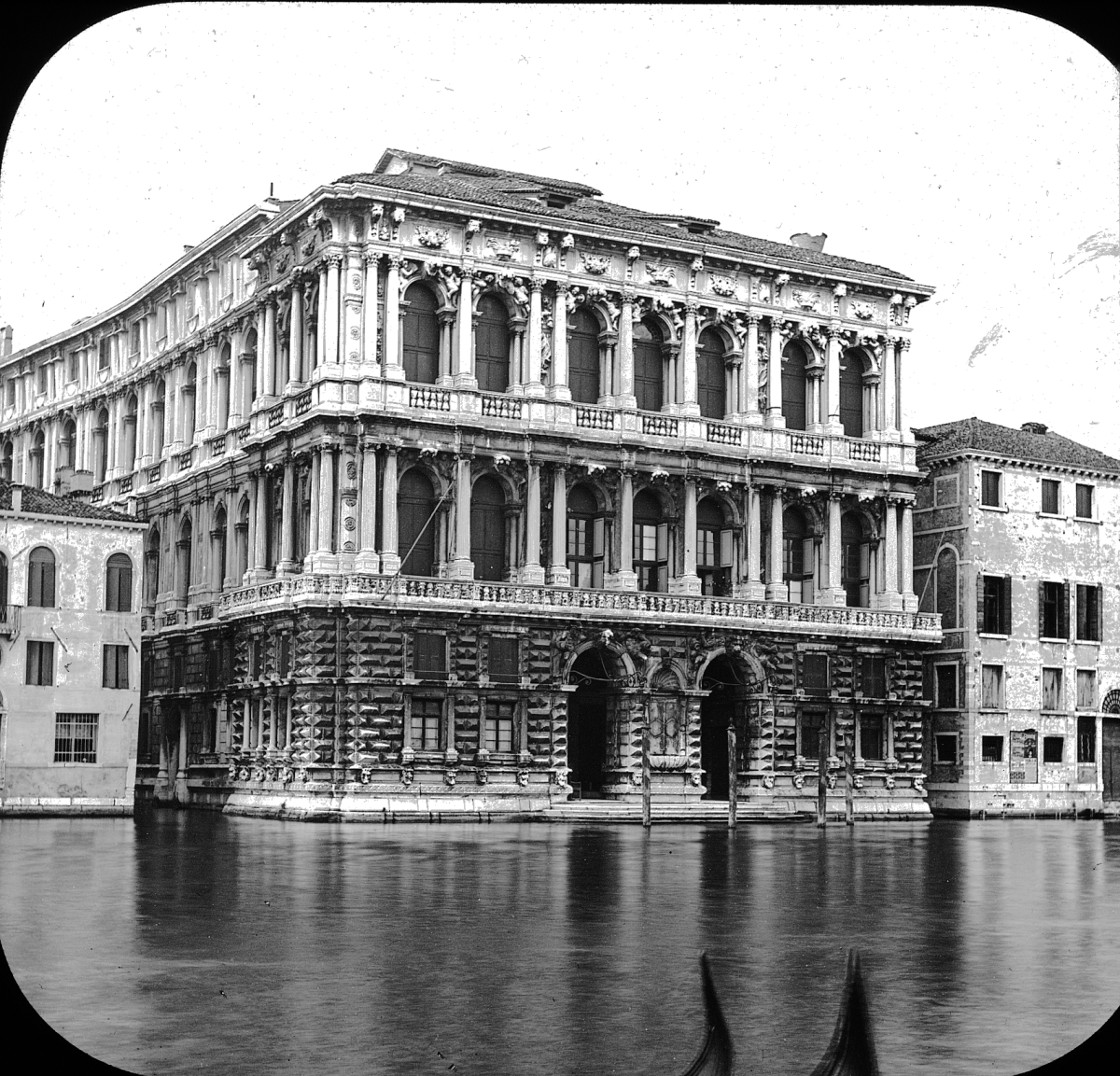
Pesaro Palace, Venice, Italy. Brooklyn Museum Archives, Goodyear Archival Collection

The palace was built in the second half of the 17th century for the noble and wealthy Pesaro family, a project by the Venetian architect, Baldassarre Longhena, who also designed the church of the Salute and Ca' Rezzonico.

Works began in 1659 starting from the landside; the courtyard was completed by 1676. By 1679, the façade on the Grand Canal had already reached the second floor, but when Longhena died 3 years after, the palace was still unfinished. The Pesaro family then entrusted its completion to Gian Antonio Gaspari who concluded it in 1710, according to the original project. Longhena was inspired by Sansovinian classicism when designing Ca’ Pesaro, creating expressions of a new and sumptuous harmony, with its complex and powerful composition, yet well-balanced. The Sansovinian motif is more explicit on the first floor, with the chiaroscuro rhythm of the arches and columns.

On the second floor, the façade is enriched by ornamentation in the pendentives and the entablatures. The entrance-hall, laid out along the axis of the entire building, contrasts with the clarity of the courtyard, articulated around the monumental well and enclosed by a terrace and an ashlar-arcade.

The palace still conserves some of the fresco and oil decorations of the ceilings by artists such as Bambini, Pittoni, Crosato, Trevisani and Girolamo Brusaferro. The collections of the Pesaro family, as documented in the archives, must have been even more remarkable, including works by artists such as Vivarini, Carpaccio, Bellini, Giorgione, Titian, Tintoretto, as well as other famous Venetian artists of the 17th and 18th centuries. This great heritage was completely dispersed by 1830, the year of the death of the last Pesaro family member, who auctioned most of the collection in London. The palace was passed on firstly to the Gradenigo family and then to the Armenian Mekhitarist Fathers in 1936, who used it as a college until 1850, before relocating to Ca' Zenobio. It was finally bought by the Bevilacqua family, and became the property of Duchess Felicita Bevilacqua La Masa. It was she who decreed the present usage of the building, bequeathing it to the city in 1898, as a museum of Modern Art.

In 1902, thanks to the bequest of the Duchess, the city council decided to use the palace to host the Modern Art municipal collection, which had been started in 1897, when the second Venice Biennale was held. Shortly afterwards, between 1908 and 1924, it also was used to host the Bevilacqua La Masa exhibitions, which, in lively contrast with the Venice Biennale, favored a generation of young artists, including Boccioni, Casorati, Gino Rossi, Juti Ravenna and Arturo Martini. The collection was enriched over the years by further acquisitions and donations.

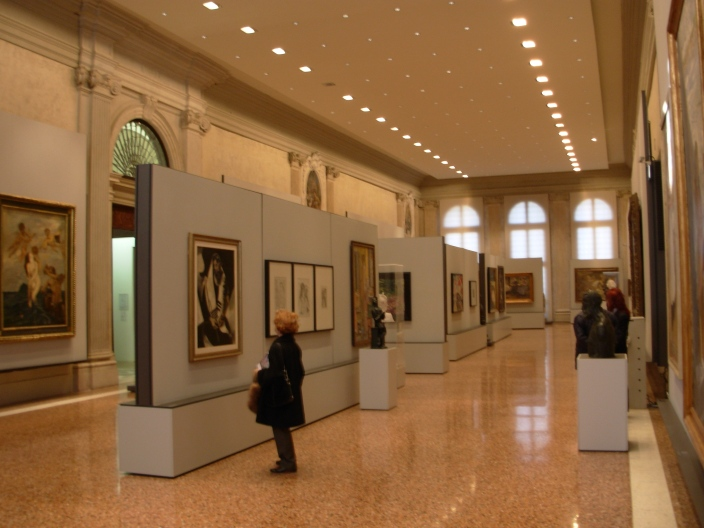
Galleria Internazionale d'Arte Moderna

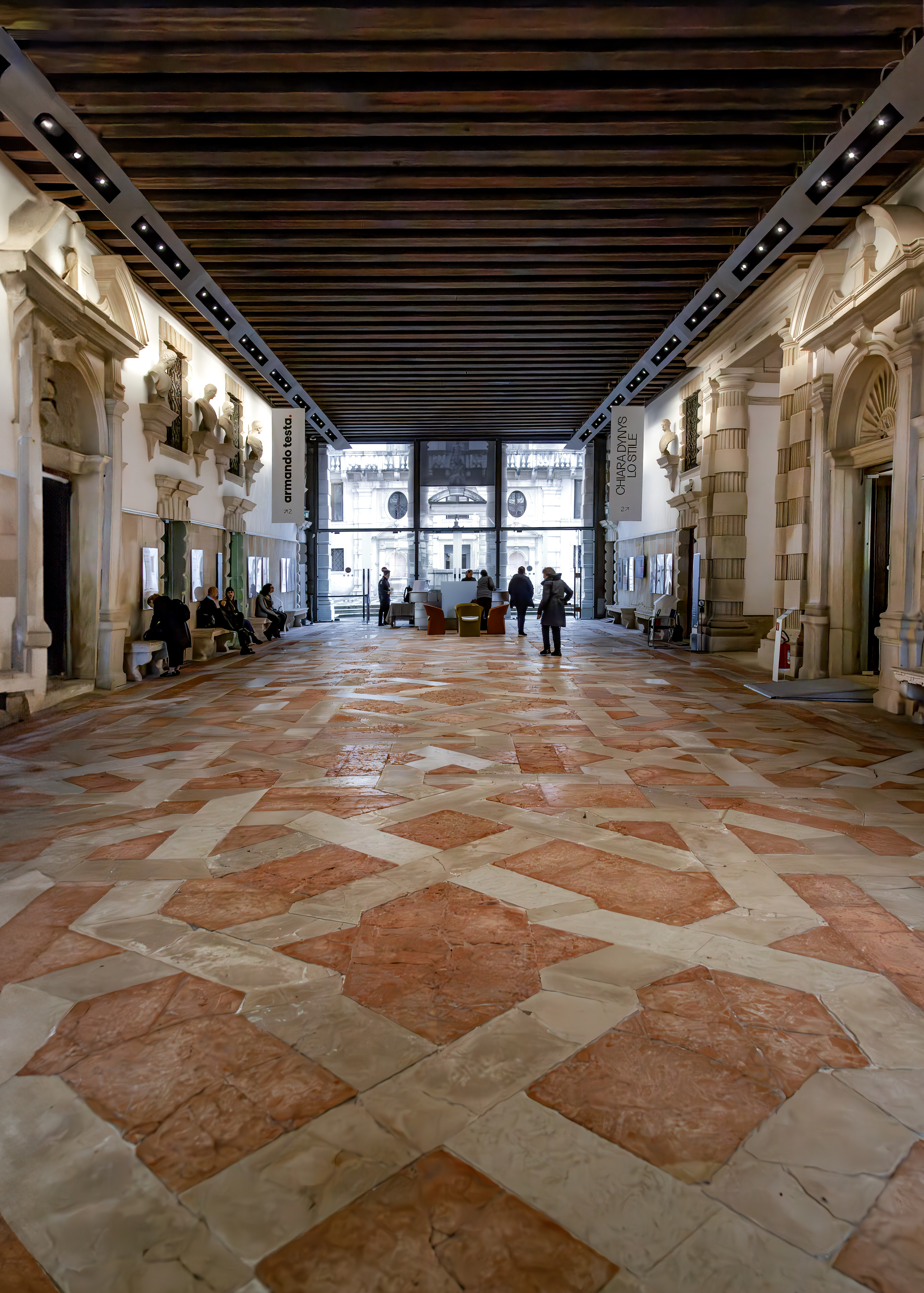
Portego - view from the entrance on the grand canal towards the inner courtyard

== Modern art museum ==
Ca' Pesaro houses 19th and 20th century collections of paintings and sculptures, as well as a section on graphic art.

- Room 1: Works by Venetian painters of the second half of the 19th century, such as Ippolito Caffi, Guglielmo Ciardi, Giacomo Favretto, and Pietro Fragiacomo are on display, testifying to the city's art variety in the 19th and the early 20th century.
- Room 2: This room brings together 19th century Italian works: there are paintings by Signorini, Giovanni Fattori, De Nittis, Guiseppe Pellizza, Gaetano Previati, and Angelo Morbelli. The city of Venice was stirred by the presence of these artists at the city's Biennale to acquire their works, which testify to the vitality of Italian painting at the turn of the century. The collection of sculptures by Medardo Rosso is also of special importance.
- Central Hall: The central hall displays works from the very first Venice Biennale up to the 1950s. The room begins with a homage to one of the founders of the Biennale, Riccardo Selvatico, portrayed by Alessandro Milesi, and continues with works by artists from England, Belgium, Scandinavia, Germany, France and Russia. Alongside masterpieces (such as Gustav Klimt’s Judith II and Aunt Luisa by Zuloaga), a number of other paintings that met with outstanding success during the early editions of the Biennale by Filipp Malyavin, Charles Cottet, and Joaquin Sorolla are exhibited. These works give an idea of the Biennale’s role in promoting “salon-art”, followed by others of experimental kind such as Kandinsky’s White Zig Zags. Finally, works from the museum’s graphic art collection and sculptures are also on display, together with some renowned paintings by Pierre Bonnard and Marc Chagall.
- Room 3: This room is devoted to Adolfo Wildt's sculptures, donated to Ca' Pesaro by the Wildt-Scheiwiller heirs in 1990. The Milanese artist was a protagonist of the Symbolism, but also of a period of experimentalism and innovation that influenced later generations.
- Room 4: The De Lisi bequest, exhibited in this room, was donated to the museum in 1961, and include major artworks by Italian and foreign artists. There are paintings by Felice Casorati (a central figure of the intellectual avant-garde in Turin during the early 1920s), Mario Sironi, and Alberto Martini. Other artists present in this room include Carrà, Filippo De Pisis, Giorgio Morandi, Massimo Campigli, Ottone Rosai, and Giorgio de Chirico. Tanguy, Brauner, Matta Echaurren, Joan Miró and Kandinsky, who testify the collector’s preference for surrealist themes, even in artists not generally identified with the movement.
- Rooms 5 and 6: These rooms are devoted to the Ca’ Pesaro Years, a term applied to the first season of the Bevilacqua La Masa exhibitions organized by Nino Barbantini (from 1908 to 1924). The works exhibited here brought some of the most important Italian artists to public notice and provide a clear idea of this period. Works by Ugo Valeri, Alberto Martini, Boccioni, Gino Rossi, Umberto Moggioli, and Felice Casorati on display, alongside the Burano School, which is represented by Pio Semeghini. The rooms also displays later works by Guido Cadorin, Guido Marussig, and Gennaro Favai.
- Room 7: This room offers an overview of the Italian art trends in the 1930s, 1940s and 1950s, with works by Antonio Donghi, Luigi Tito, Lorenzo Viani, Giuseppe Cesetti, and Guido Cadorin. A tapestry work by Fortunato Depero is displayed together with works by Enrico Prampolini and Toti Scialoja. In the center of the room is a work by Umberto Mastroianni. Other artists present in this room include Leone Minassian and Franco Gentilini.
- Room 8: This room offers an overview of some Italian art trends during the post-World War II period. Figurative art is well represented by works by Filippo De Pisis, Fausto Pirandello, Bruno Cassinari, and Pericle Fazzini. By contrast, the informal experiences of Renato Birolli, Ennio Morlotti, Zoran Music, Afro Basadella, and Achille Perilli are flanked by abstract works by Bice Lazzari. Works range from Emilio Vedova’s Europe to Renato Birlolli’s Wall of a Fisherman’s House. Visitors can also see on display works by artists such as Mirko Basaldella and Leoncillo.
- Room 9: After World War II, Venetian art entered a new, lively phase, with the Fronte Nuovo delle Arti and the Spatialism. The protagonists of these movements are all present in this room, including Armando Pizzinato, Giuseppe Santomaso, Emilio Vedova, Tancredi, Edmondo Bacci, Guidi, Bruno Saetti, Mario Deluigi, Alberto Gianquinto, and Vittorio Basaglia.
- Room 10: A small Contemporary Art gallery inside the museum, this room is dedicated to temporary exhibitions on unpublished works, young artists’ experiments, and video art.

== Asian art museum ==
The upper floor is dedicated to the Oriental Art Museum (Italian: Museo Orientale), housing some 30,000 objects, mainly from Edo period Japan (armour, inros, netsukes, and art by Koryusai, Harunobu, Hokusai), but additionally artwork from China and Indonesia. This collection of oriental objects was brought back from a stay in Asia by Prince Henry of Bourbon-Parma, Count of Bardi, at the end of the 19th century, and bequeathed to the Italian state.

== Gallery ==
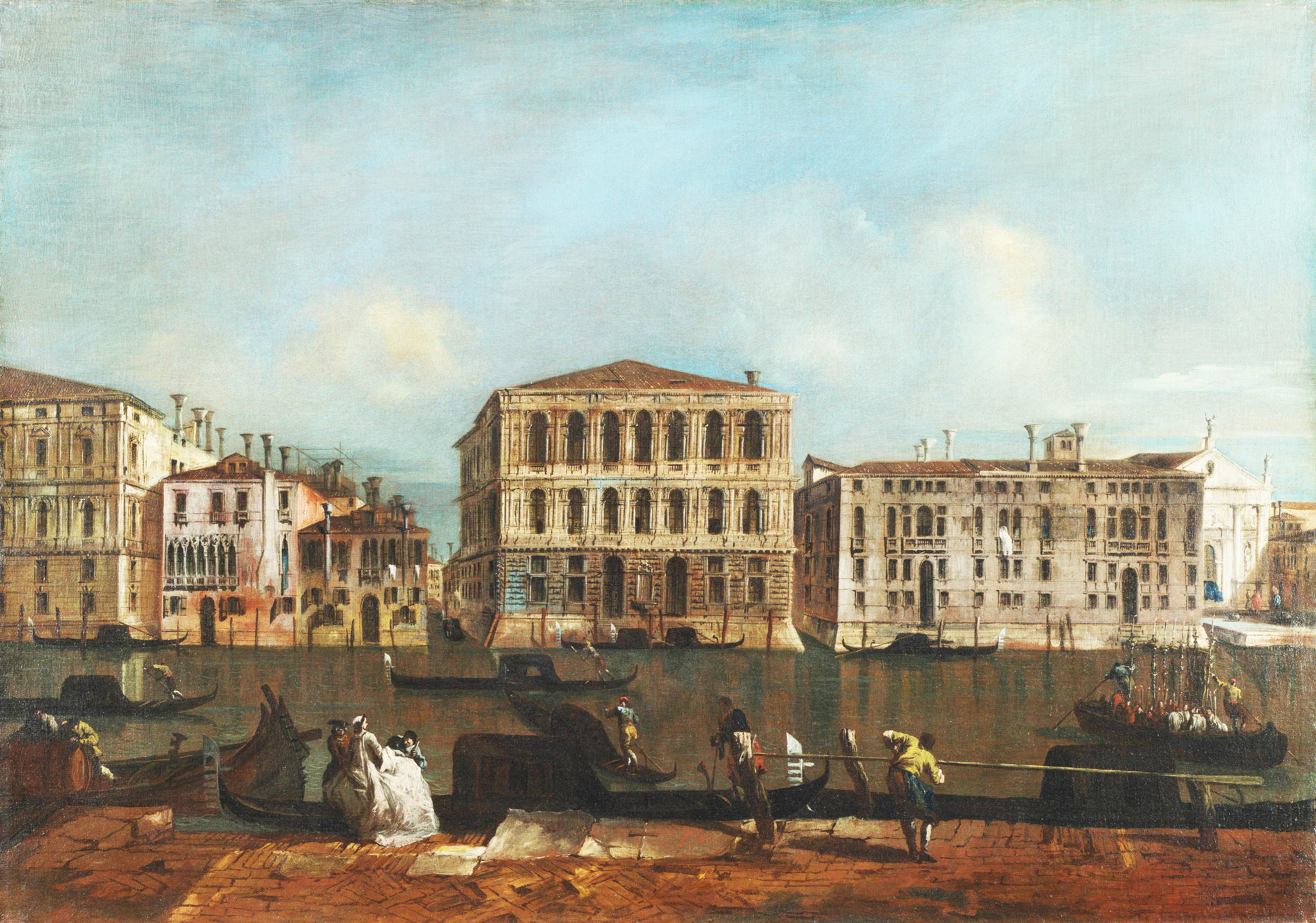
Francesco Guardi Ca Pesaro 1755-60

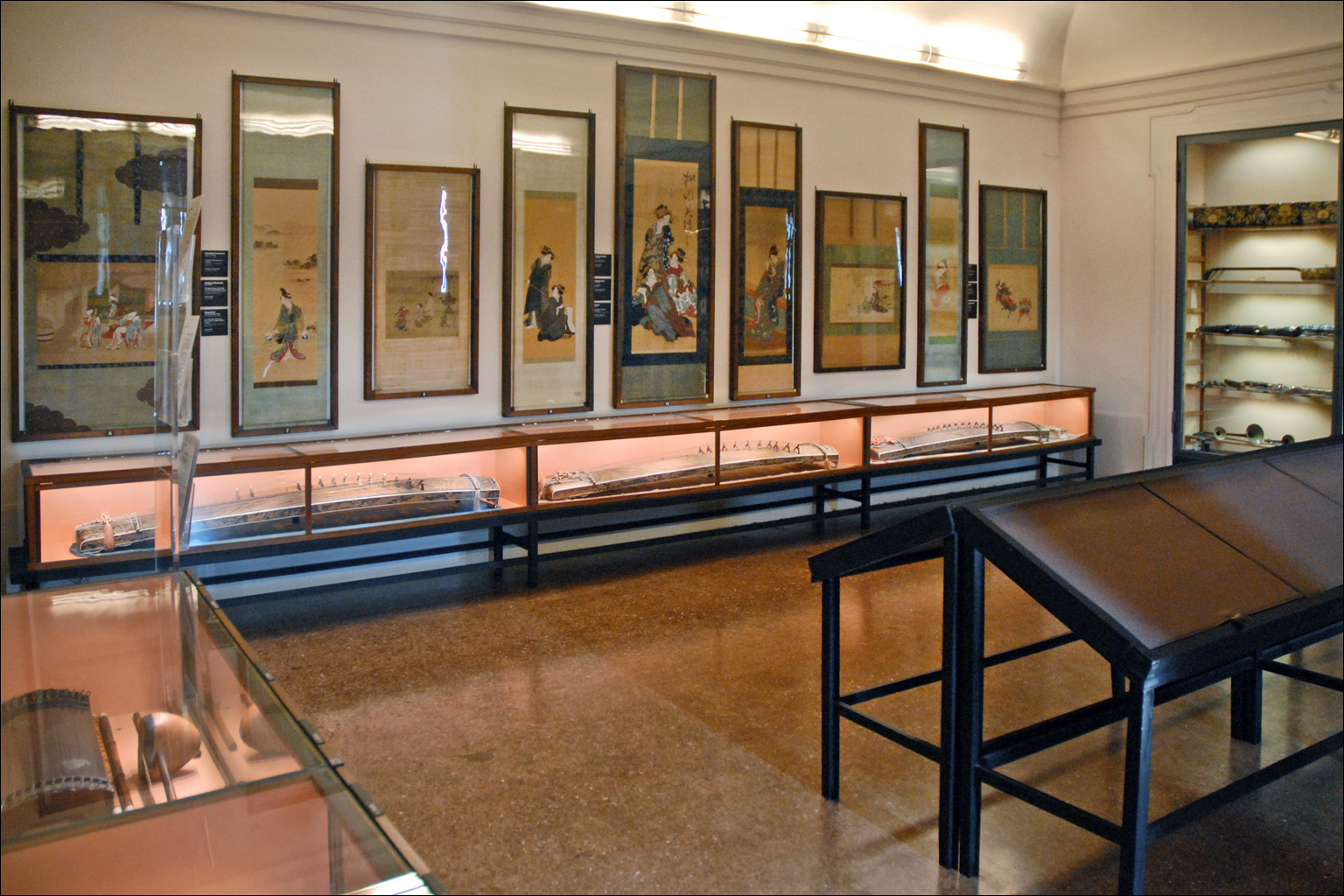
Oriental art

== See also ==
- List of buildings and structures in Venice

Preceded by Ca' Foscari	Venice landmarks Ca' Pesaro	Succeeded by Ca' Rezzonico
