= Tognoni =

Tognoni is an Italian surname. Notable people with the surname include:

- Giancarlo Tognoni (1932–2020), Italian painter, engraver and sculptor
- Gina Tognoni (born 1973), American actress

== See also ==
- Tognini
