= Giancarlo Tognoni =

Italian artist (1932–2020)

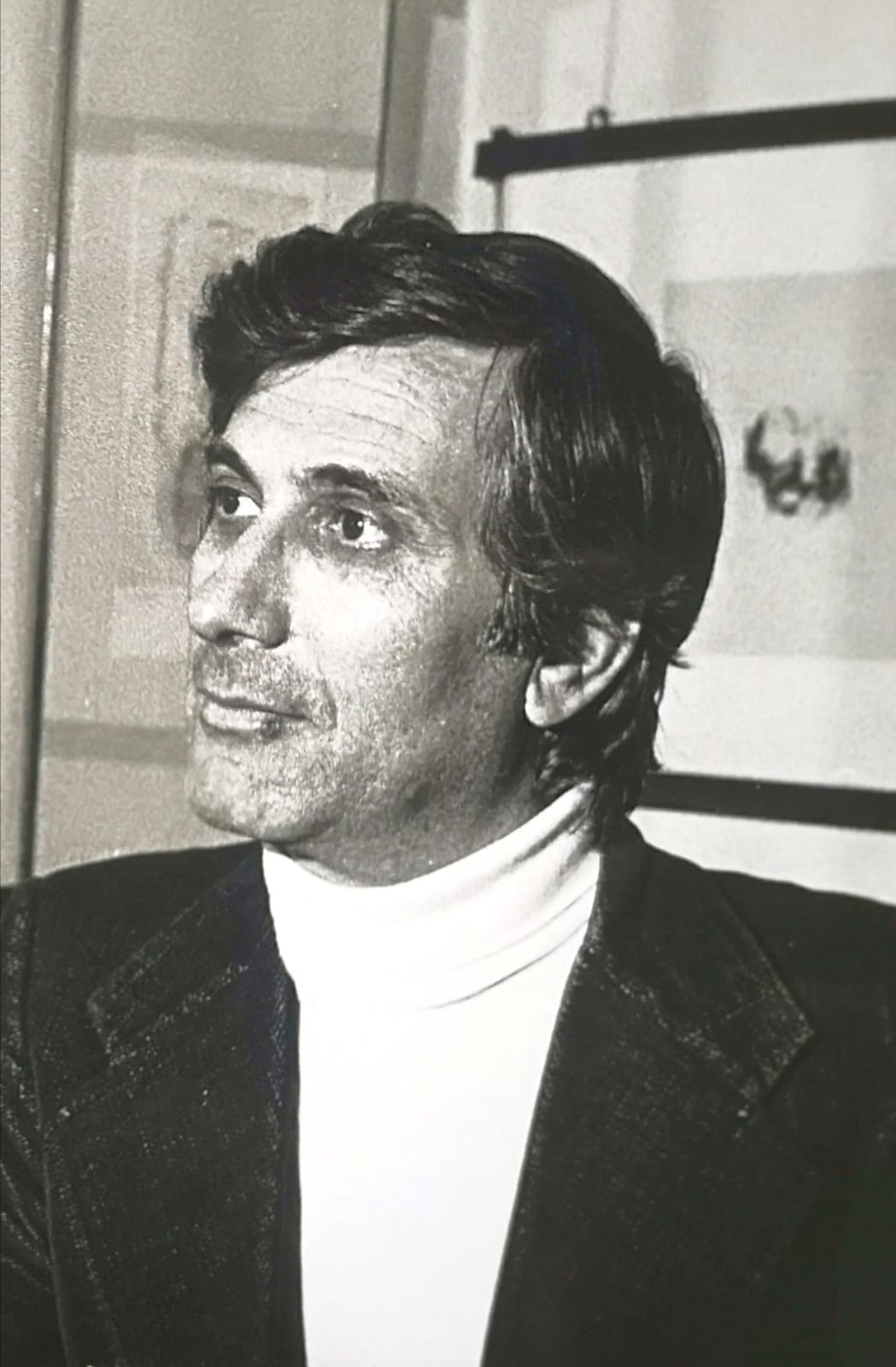
- Giancarlo Tognoni in San Benedetto a Settimo
- Born: June 22, 1932; Pisa, Italy
- Died: December 13, 2020 (aged 88); San Benedetto a Settimo, Pisa, Italy
- Resting place: Crypt at Cemetery of San Benedetto a Settimo, Pisa, Italy; 43.68218355451399°N 10.52650978464369°E
- Education: Istituto statale d'arte di Firenze (1950), Accademia di belle arti di Firenze (Magistero 1954)
- Known for: Painting, Graphics, Etching, Lithography, Drypoint
- Notable work: "Albero della Scienza" in Palazzo Puteano of Scuola Normale Superiore di Pisa
- Movement: Abstract art, Abstract expressionism, Arte Informale
- Spouse: Mirella Cordini Franchi (m. 1962)
- Awards: Il Fiorino (1966); Medaglia d'oro alla seconda Biennale Internazionale della Grafica a Firenze (1970); Primo premio nazionale Giuseppe Viviani per la grafica (1975); Premio internazionale "Ultimo Novecento" per un artista (1986); Onorato con la commenda dal Presidente della Repubblica Italiana (2002); Premio nazionale letterario Pisa
- Patrons: Franco Russoli, Piercarlo Santini

Giancarlo Tognoni (22 June 1932 - 13 December 2020).Giancarlo Tognoni was an Italian painter, engraver and sculptor. He was born in Pisa, but continued his studies in Florence, where he attended the art institute of the Tuscan capital. As soon as he graduated, he began his activity as a sculptor and ceramist, then coming to learn the various engraving techniques such as drypoint and etching, which will lead him to be considered one of the most important artists of Italian and foreign engravering art. Towards the end of the 1950s, he lived for some time in Paris, where he met Alberto Magnelli and Gino Severini and where, in particular, he could admire artists such as Jean Fautrier and Hartung. It is in this period, which will mark a transitory but significant season, that Tognoni approaches sign and material painting. At the beginning of the 1960s, he moved to Milan, where he began to attend the artistic circles of the city, spending most of his days at the "Spirale", the famous art printing house. It is here that Tognoni meets Giuseppe Ajmone and Franco Russoli, with whom he will benefit form a strong friendship. The one with Franco Russoli, director of the Brera Art Gallery, will be a very important partnership, as will put Tognoni in contact with the main artists of the moment, such as Piero Manzoni and Lucio Fontana and will encourage him to participate in many of the most important national and international exhibitions and reviews. This is how the first significant successes and recognitions arrive, testimonies that will accompany him later, in his intense activity, both as a painter and as an engraver, but despite which, Tognoni will remain a secluded artist, out of the big spotlights, gathered in his own creativity, as well as study and experimentation. Many of the major Italian and international critics have written about him (Russoli, Ragghianti, Birke, Oberhuber, Santini, Monti, Venturi, Harprath, Freedberg, Bolelli, Nocentini, Perocco, Marchiori, Monteverdi, Miceli, Mugnoz, Carlesi, Gatto, Damiani, De Rosa, Federici, Settembrini, De Martino, Triglia, Paloscia, Luperini, and many others). His works are found in public and private collections: Florence, Gabinetto disegni e stampe degli Uffizi; Vienna, Accademia Albertina; Paris, special collections of the Bibliothèque nationale de France; Pisa, Department of History of Arts, University of Pisa "Collezione Timpano"; Barcelona, Fundació Joan Miró; Milan, Musei del Castello Sforzesco, collection "A. Bertelli"; Venice, International Gallery of Modern Art Ca'Pesaro; Washington, D.C., National Gallery of Art; Pisa, Scuola Normale Superiore di Pisa Puteano palace; Lucca, National Museum of Villa Guinigi; Batavia, Illinois, Fermilab; Turin, Fondazione per la Scuola "Educatorio Duchessa Isabella della Compagnia di San Paolo"; Monaco, Staatliche Graphische Sammlung München; Oderzo, Foundation Alberto Martini; Bagnacavallo, Graphics National Center; Carrara Accademia di Belle Arti; Trieste, Revoltella Museum.

== Bibliography ==
- Tognoni, Giancarlo; Guidi, Silvia (2004). Giancarlo Tognoni. Le opere dal 1970 al 2001. Felici. ISBN 9788888327730.
- Tognoni, Giancarlo; Bellettini, Giorgio (1998). Corrispondenze. 31 opere su carta di Giancarlo Tognoni. Bandecchi & Vivaldi.
- Galleria Menghelli Firenze (1972). Giancarlo Tognoni. Tipografia STIAV.
- Tognoni, Giancarlo (2010). Giancarlo Tognoni: nel mistero della natura. Pacini.
- Tognoni, Giancarlo (1967). Giancarlo Tognoni dal 30 dicembre al 19 gennaio 1968. Galleria d'arte moderna Il Ponte.
- Tognoni, Giancarlo; Bolelli, Tristano (1991). Giancarlo Tognoni omaggio a Galileo Galilei: opere su carta. Fondazione Premio internazionale Galileo Galilei dei Rotary Italiani.
- Tognoni, Giancarlo (1990). Giancarlo Tognoni opera grafica 1965-1990. Nuvolanera, galleria dell'incisione.
- Tognoni, Giancarlo; Monti, Raffaele (1972). Giancarlo Tognoni Mostra dal 10 al 28 Marzo 1972, Galleria Menghelli, Firenze. Galleria Menghelli.
- Tognoni, Giancarlo (1985). Giancarlo Tognoni incisioni 1965-1985. Pacini.
- Tognoni, Giancarlo; Baudelaire, Charles; Damiani, Nedo; Micieli, Nicola (1995). 9 variazioni da Baudelaire. Bandecchi & Vivaldi.
