= Germaine A. Hoston =

American political scientist

- Citizenship: United States of America and France
- Known for: Comparative East Asian and Western political theory Neo-Confucianism and Western philosophy Political theory regarding nationalism, state formation, and social revolution Comparative political theology and liberation theology
- Awards: Selma V. Forkosch Prize (2024); Phi Beta Kappa; The Japan Foundation (1985) (Note: A grant for publication of Marxism and the Crisis of Development in Prewar Japan.); First woman tenured at JHU Political Science; First African American in JHU Political Science; First tenured woman of color in the UCSD Political Science Department

Academic background
- Education: BA, MA, PhD
- Alma mater: Princeton University (AB) and Harvard University (MA and PhD)
- Thesis: State and Revolution in China and Japan: Marxist Perspectives on the Nation-State and Social Revolution in Asia (1981)
- Doctoral advisor: Benjamin I. Schwartz; John D. Montgomery

Academic work
- Discipline: Political Science
- Sub-discipline: Comparative Politics and Political Theory; East Asian and Continental Political Philosophy and their Relationship to Political and Economic Development; Comparative Systematic, Liberal, and Liberation Theology
- Institutions: University of California, San Diego (1992–present); The Johns Hopkins University (1980–1992)
- Main interests: Comparative normative political theory (Chinese, Japanese, and continental political philosophy); philosophical idealist, Marxist, and post-Marxist political philosophy; the relationship between political theory and political and economic change; liberalism and democratic theory; comparative theology, including comparative liberation theology
- Notable works: Marxism and the Crisis of Development in Prewar Japan (1986); The State, Identity, and the National Question in China and Japan (1994); A Confucian ‘Theology’ of Liberation? Socialist Revolution and Spiritual Regeneration in Chinese and Japanese Marxism (1990); Conceptualizing Bourgeois Revolution (1991); Neo-Confucianism and the Development of German Idealism (2024)
- Website: germaineahoston.com

Germaine A. Hoston is an American and French political scientist, political theorist, and political theologian and professor at the University of California San Diego, specializing in comparative politics and political theory, East Asian and European continental political philosophy and theology, and the relationship between political history and the political and economic development of China and Japan. A notable scholar of East Asian and comparative political philosophy and theology, she is known for her multilingual scholarship at the intersection of political theory, nationalism, state formation, and reformist and revolutionary change in modern East Asia. Working on both Chinese and Japanese political thought, as well as continental political philosophy, Hoston published her first book, Marxism and the Crisis of Development in Prewar Japan (1986), remains the definitive English-language source on the Japanese capitalism debate (Nihon shihon-shugi ronsō) of the 1920s and 1930s. Her second book comparing the resolution of the national question among Chinese and Japanese thinker-activists in the twentieth century, which originated as her doctoral dissertation, includes extensive comparisons with continental European Marxist and post-Marxist philosophers. As of 2025, Hoston is working on two forthcoming books, Faith, Hope, and Revolutionary Change, (Note: A comparative study of Latin American, South African, Black (US), Asian, Muslim, deaf and other otherwise enabled theologies.) and another book on Neo-Confucianism and its influence on modern and contemporary Chinese, Japanese, and Western philosophy. (Note: A theme on which Hoston has recently published a series of articles in leading academic journals.)

Hoston was awarded the 2024 Selma V. Forkosch Prize. Of Native American, French, English, as well as African-American ancestry, Hoston is the first woman and first person of color to be tenured at Johns Hopkins University's Political Science department as well as at the University of California San Diego's Political Science Department.

== Early life and education ==
Hoston’s involvement with East Asia began when she spent three years of her childhood in Japan. Hoston graduated summa cum laude from Princeton University with a Bachelor of Arts in Politics and a Certificate of Proficiency in East Asian Studies, completing her degree in three years. She was inducted into Phi Beta Kappa. At Princeton, Hoston acquired fluency in Chinese (Mandarin) and learned classical Chinese.

She earned her Master of Arts and Doctor of Philosophy degrees in the Department of Government at Harvard University. Initially focused exclusively on contemporary China, at Harvard, Hoston began doing comparative work on both Chinese and Japanese political thought Her dissertation, "State and Revolution in China and Japan: Marxist Perspectives on the Nation-State and Social Revolution in Asia," was supervised by Benjamin I. Schwartz and John D. Montgomery. Her graduate studies were supported by a National Science Foundation Fellowship, a Foreign Language and Areas Studies Fellowship, a Harvard University Fellowship, a Lehman Fellowship, and a research grant from the American Association of University Women. After completing her doctorate, Hoston also studied theology and Biblical Greek at the Ecumenical Institute of Saint Mary's Seminary in Baltimore, Maryland.

== Career ==
=== Johns Hopkins University ===
Hoston joined Johns Hopkins University in 1980 as an assistant professor of political science, becoming the department's first African American faculty member. She became the first woman to receive tenure in the department and the first scholar of color to receive tenure at the university. She served a two-year term as director of the undergraduate program in political science.

During her time at Johns Hopkins, she received a Rockefeller Foundation International Relations Fellowship and a National Endowment for the Humanities Fellowship. She conducted extensive research in Japan as a foreign research fellow at the Institute of Social Science, University of Tokyo, as well as in Hong Kong, and France, where her appointment as visiting professor at the Centre de Recherche et de Documentation sur la Chine Contemporaine (now defunct) at L'Ecole des Hautes Etudes en Sciences Sociales in Paris was supported by the Maison des Sciences de l’Homme.

=== University of California, San Diego (1992–present) ===
In 1992, Hoston joined the University of California San Diego as a tenured Professor of Political Science. She founded and directed the Center for Democratization and Economic Development (1992–1999) and has served on the Executive Committees of both the Chinese Studies Program and Japanese Studies Program. She conceptualized and co-chaired the "Competing Modernities in Twentieth-Century Japan" conference series (1994–1997), securing major funding from the Japan Foundation and Japan-United States Friendship Commission.

=== Contributions and research ===
==== Japanese and Chinese revolutionary thought ====
Hoston's first book, Marxism and the Crisis of Development in Prewar Japan (1986), remains the definitive English-language source on the Japanese capitalism debate (Nihon shihon-shugi ronsō) of the 1920s and 1930s. The work, an expansion of a chapter of Hoston's four-volume dissertation, analyzes the theoretical and practical debate between the Rōnō-ha (Labor-Farmer Faction) and Kōza-ha (Lecture Faction) regarding whether Japan required a two-stage revolution or could proceed directly to socialist transformation.

Her second book, The State, Identity, and the National Question in China and Japan (1994), is a 628-page comparative study drawing on over one thousand sources in Chinese, Japanese, and Western languages. The book examines how East Asian revolutionary theorists—anarchist, Marxist, and state socialist theorists typically associated with the political right—reconciled nationalist imperatives with internationalist socialist thought, challenging common Western assumptions about the relationship between nation and state.

==== Neo-Confucianism and Western continental philosophy ====
Hoston's most recent research studies the influence of Neo-Confucianism on modern philosophy. Her article "Neo-Confucianism and the Development of German Idealism" (2024) demonstrates how the ideas of Zhu Xi and Wang Yangming shaped the development of German idealism, despite Kant's and Hegel's apparent Sinophobia. This article received the 2024 Selma V. Forkosch Prize from the Journal of the History of Ideas.

Her recent publications have built on these insights to explore connections between East Asian philosophy and other strands of Western philosophy, including studies on Gramsci and Mao; Levinas, Wang Yangming, and liberation theology; the concept of "Revolutionary Confucianism."

Her scholarship is characterized by what reviewers have called "intimidating erudition" and "multilingual virtuosity." She works with primary sources in Chinese (Mandarin), Japanese, French, German, Spanish, Italian, Russian, Latin, and Koine Greek. Kevin M. Doak described her work as "monumental," while Arif Dirlik praised her for "affirming the necessity of studying ideology" in understanding political transformation.

Hoston is a member to Council on Foreign Relations and has served as an Academic Representative to the Atlantic Council of The Johns Hopkins University and University of California San Diego. She has chaired the Research Fellowships Subcommittee (1998–2000) at the American Advisory Committee at Japan Foundation, was elected Vice-Chair of the American Political Science Association, and chaired the Northeast Asia Council (NEAC), Association for Asian Studies (1992–1995). She also served on Board of Trustees of Virginia Theological Seminary (affiliated with the Episcopal Church), the Board of Directors of the Institute for EastWest Studies (formerly the Institute for East-West Political Studies, now the EastWest Institute), for which she helped to organize workshops on democratization in Eastern and Central Europe; and the Board of Trustees of The Asia Society (1994–2000). Hoston has also served on the Editorial Board of The Journal of Politics.

Hoston has been active in the Episcopal Church, serving in several roles within the Episcopal Diocese of Maryland, including as a deputy to the General Convention of the Episcopal Church. She was a member of the General Convention's Commission on Human Affairs during the campaign for divestment from South Africa. From 2008 to 2024, she chaired the Audit Committee of Lotus Outreach International, a nonprofit supporting girls' education and anti-trafficking efforts in Cambodia, India, Latin America, and the United States.

== Awards and honors ==
- Selma V. Forkosch Prize, Journal of the History of Ideas (2024)
- First woman to receive tenure, Department of Political Science, Johns Hopkins University
- First African American faculty member, Department of Political Science, Johns Hopkins University
- First Woman of Color to receive tenure in the Department of Political Science, University of California San Diego
- First scholar of color to receive tenure, Johns Hopkins University
- Rockefeller Foundation International Relations Fellowship
- National Endowment for the Humanities Fellowship
- Phi Beta Kappa, Princeton University (1975)
- Presidential Scholar (1972)

== Selected publications ==
=== Books ===
- Hoston, Germaine A. (1994). The State, Identity, and the National Question in China and Japan. Princeton University Press. ISBN 978-0691023342.
- Hoston, Germaine A. (1986). Marxism and the Crisis of Development in Prewar Japan. Princeton University Press. ISBN 978-0691022031.

=== Selected recent articles ===
- Hoston, Germaine A. (May 15, 2025). "Civil Society and the Public Sphere in Japanese Political Thought". Journal of International Political Theory. doi:10.1177/17550882251332521.
- Hoston, Germaine A. (January 2025). "A Neo-Confucian "Theology of Liberation"? Humanism and Ethics in Levinas, Liberation Theology, and Wang Yangming". Harvard Theological Review. 118 (1): 85–100. doi:10.1017/S0017816025000069.
- Hoston, Germaine A. (January 4, 2025). "Consciousness, Will, and Cultural Revolution in Gramsci and Mao". Philosophy and Social Criticism: 1–21. doi:10.1177/01914537241308124.
- Hoston, Germaine A. (April 2024). "Neo-Confucianism and the Development of German Idealism". Journal of the History of Ideas. 85 (2): 257–287. doi:10.1353/jhi.2024.a926149.
- Hoston, Germaine A. (2024). "Revolutionary Confucianism? Neo-Confucian Idealism and Modern Chinese Revolutionary Thought". Political Research Quarterly. 77 (2): 607–619. doi:10.1177/10659129241228489.

=== Influential earlier articles ===
- Hoston, Germaine A. (May 1992). "The State, Modernity, and the Fate of Liberalism in Prewar Japan". Journal of Asian Studies. 51 (2): 287–316.
- Hoston, Germaine A. (July 1991). "Conceptualizing Bourgeois Revolution: The Prewar Japanese Left and the Meiji Restoration". Comparative Studies in Society and History. 33 (3): 539–581.
- Hoston, Germaine A. (1990). "A 'Theology' of Liberation? Socialist Revolution and Spiritual Regeneration in Chinese and Japanese Marxism". In Cohen, Paul A.; Goldman, Merle (eds.). Ideas across Cultures: Essays on Chinese Thought in Honor of Benjamin I. Schwartz. Harvard University Press. pp. 165–221.
- Hoston, Germaine A. (1990). "A 'Theology' of Liberation? Socialist Revolution and Spiritual Regeneration in Chinese and Japanese Marxism". In Cohen, Paul A.; Goldman, Merle (eds.). Ideas across Cultures: Essays on Chinese Thought in Honor of Benjamin I. Schwartz. Harvard University Press. pp. 165–221.
- Hoston, Germaine A. (2007). “Comparative Politics and Asia: Contesting Hegemonic Inter- and Intra-Disciplinary Boundaries”. In Rich, Wilbur C. (ed.). African American Perspectives on Political Science. Temple University Press, 253–285.
