= Japan–United States Friendship Act of 1975 =

US act to promote cultural exchange

- Long title: An Act to provide for the use of certain funds to promote scholarly, cultural, and artistic activities between Japan and the United States, and for other purposes.
- Enacted by: the 94th United States Congress

Citations
- Public law: 94-118
- Statutes at Large: 89 Stat. 603

Codification
- Titles amended: 22 U.S.C.: Foreign Relations and Intercourse
- U.S.C. sections created: 22 U.S.C. ch. 44 § 2901 et seq.

Legislative history
- Introduced in the Senate as S. 824 by Jacob K. Javits (R–NY) on February 25, 1975; Committee consideration by House Foreign Affairs, Senate Foreign Relations; Passed the Senate on June 13, 1975 (Passed); Passed the House on September 26, 1975 (Passed, in lieu of H.R. 9667); Signed into law by President Gerald Ford on October 20, 1975

The Japan–United States Friendship Act of 1975 seek to establish a cooperative peacetime friendship through the exchange of artistic and cultural endowments. The United States statute is a declaration stating a Japan–United States friendship will provide a global model partnership leading to future peace, prosperity, and security in Asia. The Act of Congress acknowledges the 1971 Okinawa Reversion Agreement relinquishing United States authority of the Okinawa Prefecture better known as the Daitō Islands and Ryukyu Islands. The Act created the Japan–United States Friendship Trust Fund and Japan–United States Friendship Commission developing programs for the artistic and cultural exchanges between America and Japan.

The S. 824 legislation was passed by the 94th United States Congress and enacted into law by the 38th President of the United States Gerald Ford on October 20, 1975.

== Content of the Act ==
The United States public law was compiled as six codified sections for the administrative functions of the Japan–United States Friendship Trust Fund.

- 22 U.S.C. 44 § 2901 – Statement of Findings and Purpose
- 22 U.S.C. 44 § 2902 – Establishment of the Japan–United States Friendship Trust Fund and Expenditures
- 22 U.S.C. 44 § 2903 – Establishment of the Japan–United States Friendship Commission
- 22 U.S.C. 44 § 2904 – Functions of the Japan–United States Friendship Commission
- 22 U.S.C. 44 § 2905 – Administrative Provisions
- 22 U.S.C. 44 § 2906 – Management of the Japan–United States Friendship Trust Fund

== Emperor of Japan State Visit ==
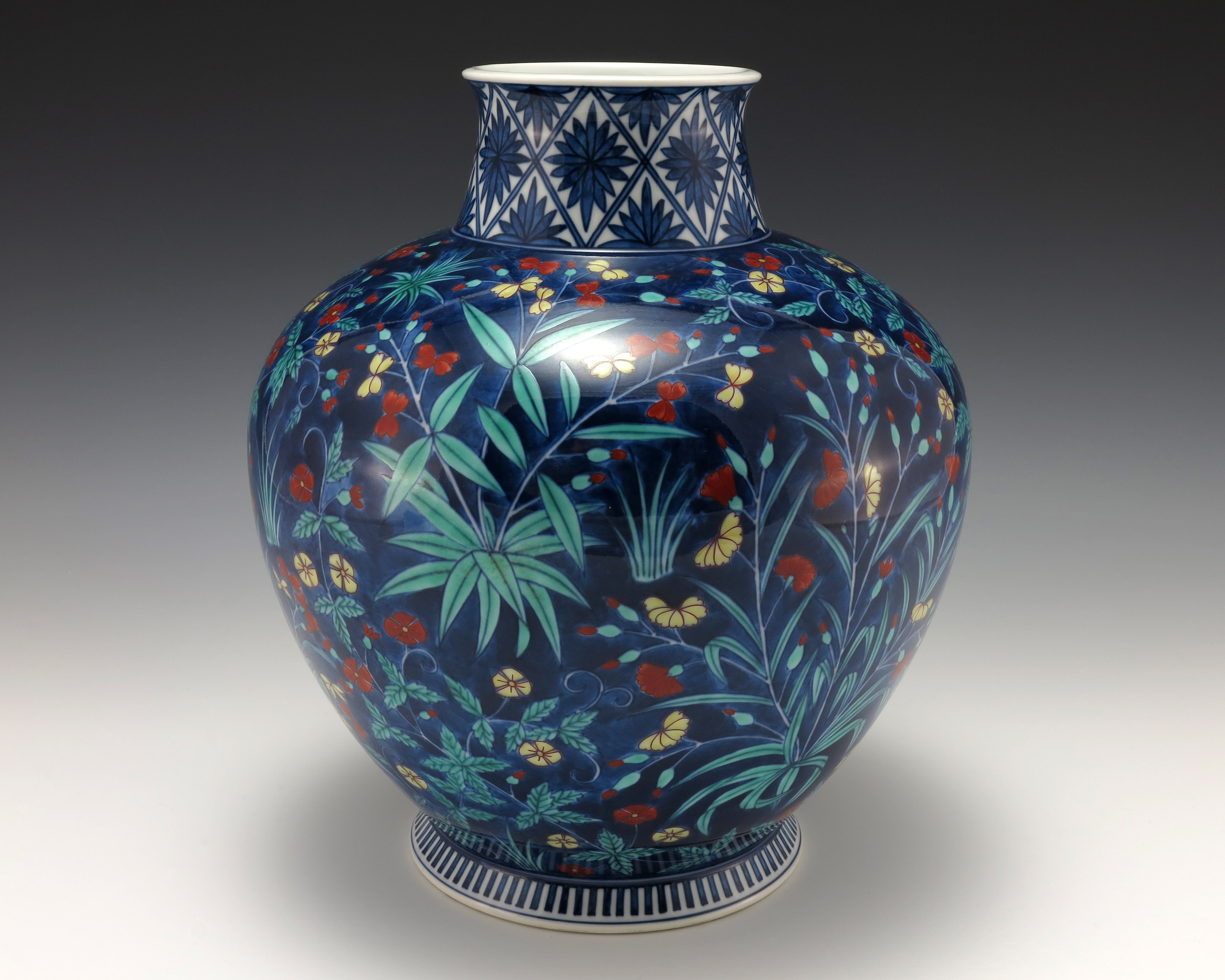
Japanese porcelain presented to U.S. President Gerald Ford

The Emperor of Japan and Empress of Japan briefly visited the United States in September 1971 while en route to Europe. Emperor Shōwa and Empress Kōjun completed a stopover at Elmendorf Air Force Base in Anchorage, Alaska meeting the 37th President of the United States Richard Nixon and First Lady Pat Nixon on September 26, 1971.

Emperor Hirohito and Empress Nagako Kuni departed the Tokyo Imperial Palace in October 1975. The imperial family of Japan by the governance of the Imperial Household Agency traveled abroad for a fifteen-day goodwill tour of the United States. The royal family of Japan joined U.S. President Gerald Ford's Administration at the White House seeking to bolster a Pacific friendship while developing a better understanding of American culture and Japanese culture.

Emperor Hirohito state visit encompassed Colonial Williamsburg, Washington, D.C., New York City, Chicago, Los Angeles, and San Francisco. Emperor Shōwa pursued marine biology interests at the Woods Hole Oceanographic Institution at Cape Cod on October 4, 1975 and the Scripps Institution of Oceanography in San Diego on October 9, 1975. Emperor Hirohito and Empress Nagako Kuni concluded their State visit to the United States in Honolulu on October 13, 1975.

== See also ==
- Japan–United States relations
- Japan–United States Security Treaty
- Japanese Cultural Center of Hawaii
- National Cherry Blossom Festival
- The Japanese Art Society of America

== Japanese Emperor Hirohito State Visit and Gerald R. Ford Presidential Papers ==
- "State Visits - Emperor Hirohito" (PDF). Box 27: Ron Nessen Papers. Gerald R. Ford Presidential Library. October 1, 1975.
- "State Visits - Meeting with Japanese Emperor Hirohito" (PDF). Box 28: Ron Nessen Papers. Gerald R. Ford Presidential Library. October 1, 1975.
- "Japan - Thank You Letter from Emperor Hirohito" (PDF). Box 2: National Security Adviser's Presidential Correspondence with Foreign Leaders. Gerald R. Ford Presidential Library. November 25, 1975.
- "Presidential Proclamation 4397 - Japan-United States Friendship Days" (PDF). 89 Stat. 1300. U.S. Government Publishing Office. October 2, 1975.
- "Proclamation - Japan-United States Friendship Days" (PDF). Box 35: William J. Baroody Files. Gerald R. Ford Presidential Library. October 2, 1975.

== Emperor of Japan Hirohito State Visit and Periodical Topics ==
- Halloran, Richard (November 19, 1974). "Hirohito and Tanaka Greet Ford in Tokyo". New York Times.
- Halloran, Richard (September 23, 1975). "Hirohito Talks of War, Peace". New York Times.
- NYT Editorial Staff (September 30, 1975). "Japan's Unpretentious Emperor". New York Times.
- Halloran, Richard (September 30, 1975). "Hirohito Leaves On U.S. Trip Amid Tight Security". New York Times.
- NYT Editorial Staff (October 2, 1975). "Hirohito". New York Times.
- Shabecoff, Philip (October 3, 1975). "Hirohito Extols Japanese-U.S Ties". New York Times.
- Halloran, Richard (October 5, 1975). "Hirohito Remains The Father Figure". New York Times.
- Franks, Lucinda (October 6, 1975). "Hirohito Samples American Ways". New York Times.
- Anderson, Dave (October 6, 1975). "Hirohito Waited for Another Touchdown". New York Times.
- NYT Editorial Staff (October 14, 1975). "Leaving, Hirohito Calls U.S. Visit Unforgettable". New York Times.

== Reading Bibliography ==
- Keizo, Shibusawa (1958). "Japanese Culture in the Meiji Era" [Life and Culture]. Internet Archive. Tokyo, Japan: The Toyo Bunko.
- "Dolls of Friendship; The Story of a Goodwill Project between the Children of America and Japan". Internet Archive. New York, New York: Committee on World Friendship Among Children. 1929.
- Chicago Historical Society; Gunther Estate (1921). "Japanese Prints and Rare Japanese Books, Kakemono, Makemono, Netsuke, Surimono, etc". Internet Archive. New York, New York: Walpole Galleries.
- Eliot, Charles William (1920). "Friendship between the United States and Japan : Superficial Causes of Misunderstanding not likely to Overbalance Sound Reasons for Maintaining Historic Amity". Internet Archive. Portland, Oregon: Japanese Merchants Association.
- Brinkley, Frank; Kikuchi, Dairoku (1915). "A History of the Japanese People from the Earliest Times to the End of the Meiji Era". Internet Archive. New York, New York: The Encyclopaedia Britannica Co.
- Strange, Edward Fairbrother (1897). "Japanese Illustrations a History of the Arts of Wood-cutting and Colour Printing in Japan". Internet Archive. London, England: G. Bell and Sons.
- Morse, Edward Sylvester (1885). "Japanese Homes and Their Surroundings". Internet Archive. New York, New York: Harper & Brothers.
- Dresser, Christopher (1882). "Japan : Its Architecture, Art, and Art Manufactures". Internet Archive. New York, New York: Scribner and Welford.
- Ancient Unknown (1200). "Old Japanese Temple Design Rules". Internet Archive. East Germany: Heinz Franz.

== Historical Video Archives ==
- Emperor Hirohito Steps Foot on US Soil - September 26, 1971 on YouTube
- Ford Meets Emperor Hirohito - November 20, 1974 on YouTube
- Emperor Hirohito Departs for USA - October 1, 1975 on YouTube
- Emperor Hirohito of Japan on Official Visit - October 1, 1975 on YouTube
- Emperor Hirohito Official Visit - October 2, 1975 on YouTube
- President Ford Welcomes Emperor Hirohito - October 2, 1975 on YouTube
- Hirohito Lays Wreath in Washington - October 4, 1975 on YouTube
- Emperor Hirohito's Visit to the UN - October 6, 1975 on YouTube
- Emperor Hirohito Visit to Rockefeller's Country Estate - October 6, 1975 on YouTube
- Japan's Emperor Hirohito Visits Disneyland - October 8, 1975 on YouTube

== Emperor of Japan Hirohito State Visit and U.S. Professional Athletics ==
- "1975 Press Photo Emperor Hirohito of Japan with President Ford, Henry Aaron in Washington". Worthopedia. WorthPoint Corporation. October 2, 1975.
- "1975 New York Jets Credential for Emperor Hirohito Visit to Shea". Worthopedia. WorthPoint Corporation. October 5, 1975.
