= The State, Identity, and the National Question in China and Japan =

1994 book by Germaine A. Hoston

- Cover
- Author: Germaine A. Hoston
- Language: English
- Subject: Marxism, Chinese politics, Japanese politics, Nationalism, Political philosophy
- Genre: Non-fiction
- Publisher: Princeton University Press
- Publication date: 1994
- Publication place: United States
- Pages: 640
- ISBN: 0-691-07873-4 (hardcover)
- Dewey Decimal: 951.04
- LC Class: DS775.7.H67 1994
- Preceded by: Marxism and the Crisis of Development in Prewar Japan (1986)

The State, Identity, and the National Question in China and Japan is a 1994 work of comparative political theory by Germaine A. Hoston published by Princeton University Press. Hoston examines how Chinese and Japanese Marxist intellectuals adapted Marxist revolutionary theory to their national contexts during the twentieth century. The 628-page book analyzes the tension between Marxism's internationalist doctrine calling for the abolition of the state and Asian revolutionaries' perceived need for strong national states to resist Western imperialism and achieve modernization. Based on sources in Chinese, Japanese, Russian, and European languages, Hoston traces how this fundamental contradiction led to divergent outcomes: the phenomenon of tenkō (ideological conversion) in Japan, where prominent Marxists renounced communism for emperor-centered national socialism, and the sinification of Marxism in China under Mao Zedong, which synthesized nationalist aspirations with revolutionary ideology. The book explores major theoretical debates including the Japanese capitalism debate between the Kōza-ha and Rōnō-ha factions and the Chinese social history controversy over how to periodize Chinese history according to Marxist categories.

== Background ==
This book is a revision of Hoston's 4-volume doctoral dissertation completed at Harvard. It included a chapter regarding the debate on Japanese capitalism, which was expanded and published as Marxism and the Crisis of Development in Prewar Japan (1986). Her earlier work examined the theoretical debate between Japanese Marxist factions during the 1920s and 1930s concerning the nature of Japanese capitalism and the appropriate revolutionary strategy for Japan. In that book, Hoston studied how Japanese Marxist intellectuals attempted to apply European Marxist theory to Japan's unique developmental experience, including the controversy between the Kōza-ha (Symposium Faction) and the Rōnō-ha (Labor-Farmer Faction) over whether Japan retained feudal remnants requiring a two-stage revolution or had achieved mature capitalism ready for immediate socialist transformation. Hoston demonstrates how the pioneering research on the history of Japanese economic development since the mid-nineteenth century offers new insights on the economic crisis that led a number of scholars to predict a war in the Pacific between Japan and the United States.

== Summary ==
A key element in the rise of Japanese military expansionism in the 1930s was the political cultivation of nationalism by the oligarchs who led the Meiji state (1868–1912). The State, Identity, and the National Question in China and Japan addresses the rise of nationalism in both China and as it affected the left-wing movements for social justice in the two countries. Hoston analyzes the transformation of Marxism by Chinese and Japanese intellectuals during the twentieth century as they confronted the contradiction between Marxist internationalism's call to abolish the state in pursuit of social justice, on the one hand, with their perceived need for strong national states to resist Western imperialism and assert their dignity as equals in the international order, on the other.

The "national question" in Marxist thought arose out of Marx's and Engel's internationalism: "Workers of the World, Unite!," they urged in the "Communist Manifesto," reasoning that the creation of the national state was beneficial for the development industrial capitalist economies, but in mature capitalist societies, the invocation of nationalism divided the international workers’ movement for the sake of wars waged to protect the interests of capital. However, the national question was implicit in the adaptation of Marxism to later industrializing societies, including Germany. Paradoxically Marx and Engels minimized Germany's lack of a unified national state when they prescribed the same proletarian-socialist revolution for Germany that they advocated for England and France, which had experienced bourgeois-democratic revolutions. The issue was exacerbated in Russia, where Lenin advocated self-determination for non-Russian peoples and promised relinquishment of foreign territories claimed by the tsarist regime. After the Bolshevik Revolution, the national question arose in Asia, as the prospects for socialist revolution in Europe faded, prompting Soviet leaders to shift the focus of their revolutionary activities to Asia. There they encountered divergent circumstances. In China, economically crippled by Western and Japanese imperialism, Ruist (Confucian) and Legalist statecraft traditions intersected with anarchist influences such as Daoism. By contrast, Japan, the Meiji state's successful industrializing revolution from above achieved industrial capitalism – which it legitimized by combining indigenous Shinto, Ruist, and ideas into the kokutai myth — but a backward agrarian sector remained. With their Eurocentric bias, Soviet leaders nevertheless prescribed the same revolutionary strategy for both countries, but encouraged Chinese nationalism while condemning Japanese nationalism, which they viewed as a threat since Japan's defeat of Russia in 1905. These distinct socioeconomic and philosophical landscapes would profoundly shape how thinker-activists in China and Japan approached the national question.

Anarchism initially attracted more Chinese and Japanese radicals than Marxism did. Kōtoku Shūsui in Japan and the Paris and Tokyo groups of Chinese anarchists embraced anarchism's anti-authoritarian critique of both despotism under the Chinese imperial state and the modern capitalist state. The 1917 Bolshevik Revolution disrupted this trajectory when the civil war and foreign invasion required consolidation of state power, challenging anarchist interpretations. Takabatake Motoyuki in Japan and Dai Jitao in China responded by formulating national or state socialist doctrines attempting to reconcile Marxist social revolution with nationalist state-building. In both countries, the national question led thinker-activists to philosophical insights that diverged in varying degrees from both original Marxist theory and its official Soviet version. In other words, Hoston emphasizes, Chinese and Japanese revolutionary leaders did not merely adopt Western ideas; rather, they developed their own philosophies, shaped by their circumstances and their respective indigenous philosophical traditions

Two theoretical debates shaped Marxist thought in both countries during the 1920s and 1930s. In Japan, the debate on Japanese capitalism split Marxists between the Kōza-ha (Symposium Faction) and Rōnō-ha (Labor-Farmer Faction named after their respective publications). The Kōza-ha agreed with the Comintern characterization of the imperial state as feudal and absolutist, requiring a two-stage revolution; the Rōnō-ha viewed Japan as having achieved bourgeois revolution, necessitating immediate socialist transformation. This debate centered on whether Japan exhibited characteristics of Marx's "Asiatic mode of production" or had followed a European pattern of feudalism transitioning to capitalism. The Chinese controversy on social history saw intellectuals producing over thirty competing periodization schemas attempting to categorize China as feudal, semi-feudal, capitalist, or representing the Asiatic mode of production—each interpretation dictating different revolutionary strategies.

These tensions were resolved differently in the two countries by the late 1930s. In Japan, the tenkō (ideological conversion) phenomenon saw Marxist leaders like Sano Manabu and Nabeyama Sadachika renounce communism for national socialism centered on the emperor system. Psychological pressures of imprisonment combined with the irreconcilable conflict between Comintern directives to abolish the emperor system and Japanese national identity triggered these mass defections. These conversions involved theoretical reformulations synthesizing Marxist social analysis with Japanese nationalism, representing what the work characterizes as intellectual efforts to reconcile conflicting loyalties rather than simple capitulations.

In China, Mao Zedong's sinification of Marxism integrated nationalist aspirations with revolutionary theory. Mao's synthesis incorporated populist and voluntarist strands from Chinese philosophy while maintaining social revolution as the goal. The Chinese Communist movement positioned itself as defender of national interests against Japanese invasion while adapting Marxist theory to Chinese conditions—avoiding the legitimacy crisis that crippled the Japanese revolutionary movement. This adaptation drew on indigenous philosophical perspectives, particularly the anarchist current that remained in tension with the urge to create a viable, unified state.

Both Chinese and Japanese Marxists faced the dilemma that accepting Marxism might constitute submission to Western cultural imperialism even as they wielded it against Western political and economic domination. The Asiatic mode of production concept particularly troubled Asian Marxists: Marx's writings suggested Asian societies lacked the internal dynamics for capitalist development and required Western intervention to enter universal history. Japanese Marxists could claim their Tokugawa period matched Marx's conception of feudalism, but Chinese intellectuals struggled to locate similar stages in their history.

Hoston employs extensive multilingual sources, including Chinese, Japanese, Russian, and French materials, drawing on both primary texts and secondary scholarship. The analysis spans from the late nineteenth century introduction of socialist ideas through the 1980s, including the 1920s and 1930s debates and the fate of the social justice movements in postwar Japan and post-revolutionary China. The Comintern's differential treatment nationalism in their identical prescriptions for the two movements shaped outcomes: encouraging nationalism in China's "bourgeois-democratic movement of national liberation" while demanding Japanese Marxists reject their nationalist aspirations entirely. This disparity produced contrasting revolutionary trajectories that would shape their development in the decades following World War II as well as scholarship regarding those experiences. The book concludes by comparing philosophical perspectives developed among twentieth-century Chinese and Japanese with views of critical theorists in Western Europe, such as Antonio Gramsci and Jürgen Habermas.

== Reviews ==
Suzanne Ogden highlighted Hoston's ability to untangle how anarchist and Marxist ideologies changed through interaction with Asian conditions and culture, comparing the work favorably to Joseph Levenson's scholarship on modern Chinese political philosophy. Ogden emphasized how the work exposes the dilemmas Marxists faced in reshaping their societies based on an alien ideology that "at best was ignorant of, and at worst despised, their own civilizations' accomplishments." She praised the work as a study in comparative political philosophy that offers "a treasure chest of insightful mini-biographies" of Chinese and Japanese political thinkers. Ogden thought that Hoston combines solid understanding of anarchism, socialism, and Marxism with remarkable breadth and depth of knowledge about Chinese and Japanese history.

Arif Dirlik observed that the work provides extensive coverage but lacks sufficient critical analysis, noting that "all the controversies discussed in this book are well documented elsewhere." While acknowledging the admirable goal of comparing Chinese and Japanese experiences with Marxism, Dirlik, author of a previous work on the controversy on Chinese social history cited by Hoston, suggested the work might not have addressed new questions about Marxism and nationalism that have emerged in recent years.

John Fitzgerald noted that Hoston approaches intellectual history hoping to find answers that Marxism has been unwilling or unable to supply in Europe. Fitzgerald characterized the book as addressing questions about state, nation, and Marxism that have prompted Hoston "to undertake a mammoth comparative study." He described how the work traces the encounter of Japanese and Chinese intellectuals with Marxism against the historical background of Tokugawa philosophy and Chinese statecraft, based on Hoston's research and a wide range of published work from the China field.

Hilary Conroy and George C.C. Chang described the work as "first of all an intellectual history of Marxism in China and Japan, much more concerned with ideas than with real historical happenings," characterizing it as "stupendous" with 444 pages of text, 90 pages of footnotes, and 73 pages of bibliography in six languages. They found the chapters on the Japanese synthesis through tenkō and Mao's Chinese synthesis particularly fascinating. Conroy and Chang believed that "radical thinkers in both China and Japan were drawn to Marxism 'as a medium of liberation from painful subordination to the West as well as from domestic sources of oppression.'"

Peter R. Moody Jr. acknowledged the complexity of Hoston's work while noting what he considered occasional minor factual errors, observing that "usually where one might object to a particular generalization, one finds she has taken the exceptions into account and built them into her interpretation." Moody suggested that the breadth of influences and diversity among East Asian radicals might make particular interpretations seem arbitrary and ad hoc.

Erich Pilz applauded the work's comparative approach, and wrote that it was "the first that I know of to examine comparatively what Chinese and Japanese Marxists made of the national question during these crucial decades." Pilz praised Hoston's efforts to illuminate how Marxists in both countries struggled with similar problems despite their different contexts. However, Pilz criticized certain theoretical aspects, especially the treatment of Japan as a "late-developing" country, which he argued obscures Japan's unique modernization path that differed from both Western Europe and colonized Asia.

Kevin M. Doak wrote that the book explores how Marxism placed native revolutionaries in tension with their own national identities during the 1920s and 1930s. Doak emphasized that the concepts of nationality, nation, and nation-state were "vague enough in Marxism...to enable Chinese and Japanese 'Marxist' theorists to make numerous accommodations and adaptations to their own societies." He noted that according to Hoston, Marxists in East Asia attempted to reconcile a new nationalist vision of the state with commitment to internationalist socialist revolution.

Paul Bailey praised the comprehensive nature of the work while questioning some of its theoretical premises. Bailey highlighted that the book reveals how Chinese and Japanese Marxists confronted "the contradiction between the universality of Marx's historical schema and theory of revolution and the particularity of the disparate national contexts." Bailey welcomed the book's treatment of how indigenous philosophical perspectives shaped the reception and transformation of Marxism in both countries.

Nam-Lin Hur appreciated the work's attention to the role of anarchism in early socialist movements, noting that Hoston demonstrates how "anarchism initially proved more attractive than Marxism to many Chinese and Japanese radicals." He highlighted the work's analysis of how the Bolshevik Revolution fundamentally altered both movements' trajectories. Hur found the sections on tenkō particularly illuminating for understanding how Japanese Marxists attempted to resolve conflicts between communist ideology and national identity.

James L. Huffman commended the work's multilingual source base and broad chronological scope, and observed that the author "commands Chinese, Japanese, and Russian languages" and marshals "a bibliography packed with sources in a variety of languages." Huffman noted the work's contribution to understanding how the national question became central to the success of Marxism in China and its failure in Japan. However, he suggested that the work's density and length might limit its accessibility to non-specialist readers.

Harald Bøckman valued the work's treatment of how Marxist theory confronted Asian realities, especially regarding the Asiatic mode of production concept. Bøckman wrote that Hoston shows how this concept "troubled Asian Marxists" because Marx's writings suggested Asian societies lacked internal dynamics for capitalist development. He believed the comparative approach effective in illuminating both similarities and differences in how Chinese and Japanese intellectuals adapted Marxist theory to their national contexts.

Frances V. Moulder focused on the work's gender implications, though finding limited attention to women revolutionaries. Moulder noticed that despite the masculine focus of most revolutionary movements discussed, Hoston's analysis of cultural and philosophical traditions provides insight into the broader social contexts that shaped revolutionary thought. She appreciated the work's attention to how family structures and social relationships influenced the reception of Marxist ideas about social transformation.

Elisabeth Eide described the work as a comprehensive study of how Marxism was transformed through its encounter with Asian societies, stressing that "the encounter between Marxism and Asian societies generated not ideological transmission but cultural synthesis." Eide praised Hoston's ability to trace the philosophical and cultural roots of these transformations while maintaining scholarly objectivity. She prized the analysis of how both Chinese and Japanese Marxists struggled with the possibility that accepting Marxism might constitute "submission to Western cultural imperialism."

In his review, Christopher Atwood criticized the work's for seeming to adopt Benjamin Schwartz's outdated framework depicting post-1927 Chinese Communist history as Mao's single-handed struggle against Comintern dogma. Given Hoston's commands of Chinese, Japanese, and Russian languages and demonstrated expertise in Japanese Marxism through extensive use of primary sources, Atwood characterized the work as "an ambitious and multi-stranded attempt to reexamine the contradictions within the Marxist theory of the state itself."
