= Edmondo Bacci =

Italian painter known for Avvenimenti series

Edmondo Bacci (July 21, 1913 – October 16, 1978) was an Italian painter born in Venice. He is best known for a series of paintings called Avvenimenti. Bacci studied at the Accademia di Belle Arti di Venezia and was a member of the artist's Movimento Spaziale, a group founded by Lucio Fontana. He began exhibiting internationally in 1956. Bacci took part in the Venice Biennale several times, in 1958 his works were accorded a separate room. From the mid 1950s onwards he was promoted and supported by Peggy Guggenheim.

The works of Bacci are represented inter alia in the collections of Museum of Modern Art (MoMA), Guggenheim Museum, Ca' Pesaro – International Gallery of Modern Art, Gallerie di Piazza Scala, and Fondazione Querini Stampalia.
