= Marxism and the Crisis of Development in Prewar Japan =

1986 book by Germaine A. Hoston

- Cover
- Author: Germaine A. Hoston
- Language: English
- Subject: Marxism in Japan, History of Japan, Political science
- Publisher: Princeton University Press
- Publication date: 1986
- Publication place: United States
- Pages: 422
- ISBN: 0-691-07722-3
- OCLC: 13271438
- Followed by: The State, Identity, and the National Question in China and Japan (1994)

Marxism and the Crisis of Development in Prewar Japan is a 1986 book by American political scientist Germaine A. Hoston. The book traces the debate on Japanese capitalism that took place between two schools of Japanese Marxist thought from 1927 to 1937: the Rōnō-ha (Labor-Farmer Faction, named after its monthly organ), which argued that Japan had developed a mature industrial capitalist economy and was ready for a proletarian-socialist revolution, and the Kōza-ha (Symposium Faction, named after its 7-volume Symposium on the History of the Development of Japanese Capitalism), (Note: Nihon shihon-shugi hattatsu-shi kōza (Tokyo: Iwanami Shoten, 1932-1933; reprint ed., 1982).) which defended the Communist International (Comintern) view that feudal remnants in Japan's agrarian economy and imperial political system necessitated a two-stage revolution. Hoston analyzes how Japanese Marxist intellectuals attempted to apply European Marxist theory to Japan's unique developmental experience during the country's transition from Taishō democracy to ultranationalist militarism from 1912 through the 1940s, addressing theoretical issues including the Asiatic mode of production, the nature of the emperor system, and the agrarian question. She also utilizes their analyses to offer a reinterpretation of the genesis of Japan's role in World War II. Drawing on primary sources, including interviews with surviving members of the two prewar factions, the book remains the first and only comprehensive English-language study of the debate, which influenced Japanese academic discourse as well as prewar and postwar Japanese politics.

== Summary ==
Hoston traces the debate on Japanese capitalism that emerged among Japanese Marxist intellectuals between 1927 and 1937, a controversy that arose as Japan transitioned from the era of Taishō democracy toward militarism and fascism. The work analyzes how Japanese Marxist scholars and political activists sought to apply European Marxist theory to Japan's particular developmental experience, viewing this theoretical effort as an attempt to find solutions to what they perceived as a rising national crisis that would culminate in Japan's military defeat in 1945.

The book begins by establishing the political, economic, and intellectual currents of Taishō Japan that provided the context for the debate. Hoston traces the evolution of Marxism in Japan from its introduction through 1927, examining how early Japanese socialists and the formation of the Japanese Communist Party in 1922 laid the groundwork for later theoretical disputes. The work then explores the external stimulus provided by the Communist International (Comintern), which issued a series of theses prescribing revolutionary strategy to be employed in Japan between 1922 and 1932 that significantly influenced the terms of the Japanese debate.

A crucial catalyst for the controversy was the challenge posed by Takahashi Kamekichi's theory of "petty imperialism," which used Marxist categories to argue that Japanese imperial expansion in Asia was both necessary and legitimate. This heterodox application of Marxist analysis challenged orthodox Marxists to develop more rigorous theoretical frameworks for understanding Japanese capitalism. The debate crystallized around two main factions that emerged following the Japanese Communist Party's adoption of the Comintern's 1927 Theses. The Rōnō-ha (Labor-Farmer faction), led by Yamakawa Hitoshi and including theorists like Inomata Tsunao, rejected the Comintern's characterization of Japan as too backward for immediate socialist revolution. They argued that Japan had already achieved mature industrial capitalism following the Meiji Restoration's bourgeois revolution, making the country ready for a one-stage transition to socialism. The opposing Kōza-ha (Symposium faction), associated with the Japanese Communist Party and scholars like Noro Eitarō and Hirano Yoshitarō, maintained that Japan remained burdened by "feudal remnants" in both its agrarian sector and political superstructure, particularly the emperor system, necessitating a two-stage revolution—first the completion of the bourgeois-democratic revolution, then a proletarian-socialist revolution.

The author investigates how this fundamental disagreement led both factions to address complex theoretical issues including the proper periodization of Japanese history and the applicability of Marx's concept of the "Asiatic mode of production" to Japan. The Kōza-ha scholars engaged with this concept to explain Japan's distinctive developmental path, arguing that "Asiatic" characteristics in Japan's feudal system had produced a distorted capitalism that combined advanced industrial development with persistent feudal elements. The debate over the nature and role of the emperor system forms another major focus, with the Kōza-ha characterizing the Meiji state and its successors as "absolutist" regimes balancing feudal and bourgeois forces, while the Rōnō-ha viewed the emperor system as a bourgeois monarchy with insignificant feudal vestiges.

Hoston also focuses on the agrarian question, as both schools grappled with explaining the dual economy that characterized Japan—advanced industrial capitalism alongside what appeared to be semi-feudal agricultural relations. The Rōnō-ha argued that landlords had undergone embourgeoisement and that capitalist relations had penetrated the countryside, while the Kōza-ha insisted that feudalistic exploitation persisted in rural areas, evidenced by the continuation of high customary rents and the poverty of tenant farmers. These agricultural conditions, the Kōza-ha maintained, provided the material basis for the absolutist state and necessitated an agrarian revolution as part of the bourgeois-democratic transformation.

The book's final chapter explains how the debate continued in modified form after World War II, examining at how the American Occupation's reforms, especially land reform and democratization measures, affected both schools' theoretical positions. The work demonstrates how the controversy evolved as scholars addressed new questions about monopoly capitalism, the nature of postwar democracy, and Japan's relationship with the United States, while fundamental disagreements about the nature of Japanese and politics character persist in academic discourse and continued to influence the programs of Japan's left-wing parties.

The author presents the debate not merely as an abstract theoretical controversy but as an earnest effort by Japanese intellectuals to understand their nation's unique developmental trajectory and to formulate appropriate strategies for political and social transformation. The participants' attempts to reconcile Marxist orthodoxy with Japanese particularities produced innovative theoretical contributions that went beyond mechanistic application of European models to address fundamental questions about the relationship between universality and particularity in political and economic development.

== Critical reception ==
Arif Dirlik highlighted the book's significance in demonstrating how Japanese Marxists confronted basic problems of Marxist theory when faced with inconsistencies between theoretical expectations and Japan's actual development. Dirlik noted that the debate sensitized Japanese Marxists to fundamental issues, with the Rōnō-ha writers emphasizing contemporary world structures while the Kōza-ha focused on Japan's distinctive historical development. The controversy, noted Dirlik, led Japanese Marxists to address "the dynamics of capitalist development, the problem of historical periodization, the relationship between feudalism and capitalism, the question of Asiatic society, and the issue of the state."

Gail Lee Bernstein found that Hoston's book filled a gap in English-language scholarship by explaining how Japanese Marxist scholars modified European Marxist theory to fit Japan's peculiar circumstances - neither fully "Asiatic" nor Western. Bernstein praised Hoston for demonstrating that these scholars were innovative theorists who became "Japan's first real social scientists" through their systematic analysis of Japanese capitalism and the emperor system.

Thomas R. H. Havens found the author's preference for the Kōza-ha interpretation apparent, and noting that she credited this school with "far deeper historical research" and an "undeniable contribution to analyzing how capitalism and the emperor system had developed since the Tokugawa period." Havens observed that the author viewed the Kōza-ha as taking "a more flexible approach that enabled them to confront the harsh realities in Japan that the Rōnō-ha ignored." He thought that the book showed how both groups "remained, for better or worse, academics whose main contribution was as pioneers of the systematic analysis of the development of their own country."

Gregory J. Kasza considered the work to be a skillful blend of chronological and analytical frameworks that would be valuable to scholars beyond those specifically interested in Japanese Marxist theory. Kasza believed that the book demonstrated how Japanese Marxists had to adjust European strains of Marxist theory to fit non-European patterns of development, although he noted that "Hoston occasionally offers assessments of the validity of the arguments described" with mixed results.

Miles Fletcher commended the work for its important message about the perceptiveness and creativity of Japanese Marxists active in the 1920s and 1930s, and believed the study of early Marxist development in Japan made a worthy contribution given the doctrine's major intellectual force in the country. Fletcher found valuable the author's depiction of the debate as "a crucial stage in the struggle of Japanese writers to adapt Marxism as an alien ideology to their nation."

Janet Hunter described the work as "a comprehensive guide to the basic Marxian interpretations and controversies informing much of modern Japanese historiography." Hunter pointed out to the author's skill in avoiding theoretical nitpicking by focusing on "the central problématique of Marxist thinkers in developing societies: how to apply nineteenth-century European Marxism to twentieth-century, Third World countries."

Rene Peritz thought that while "careful Marxist theorists have demonstrated a patient willingness in adapting orthodox positions to conform to mass Japanese public values," the book drew on commentaries by Japanese Marxist theorists, intellectuals, and leaders that proved "provocative, indeed, to assume that similar lessons and conclusions can be drawn from non-Japanese patterns of national development." Peritz found that the Marxist scholars mentioned throughout the piece provided "safe enough ground in documenting and stressing Japanese economic difficulties in historical context."
