= Gino Rossi (painter) =

Italian painter

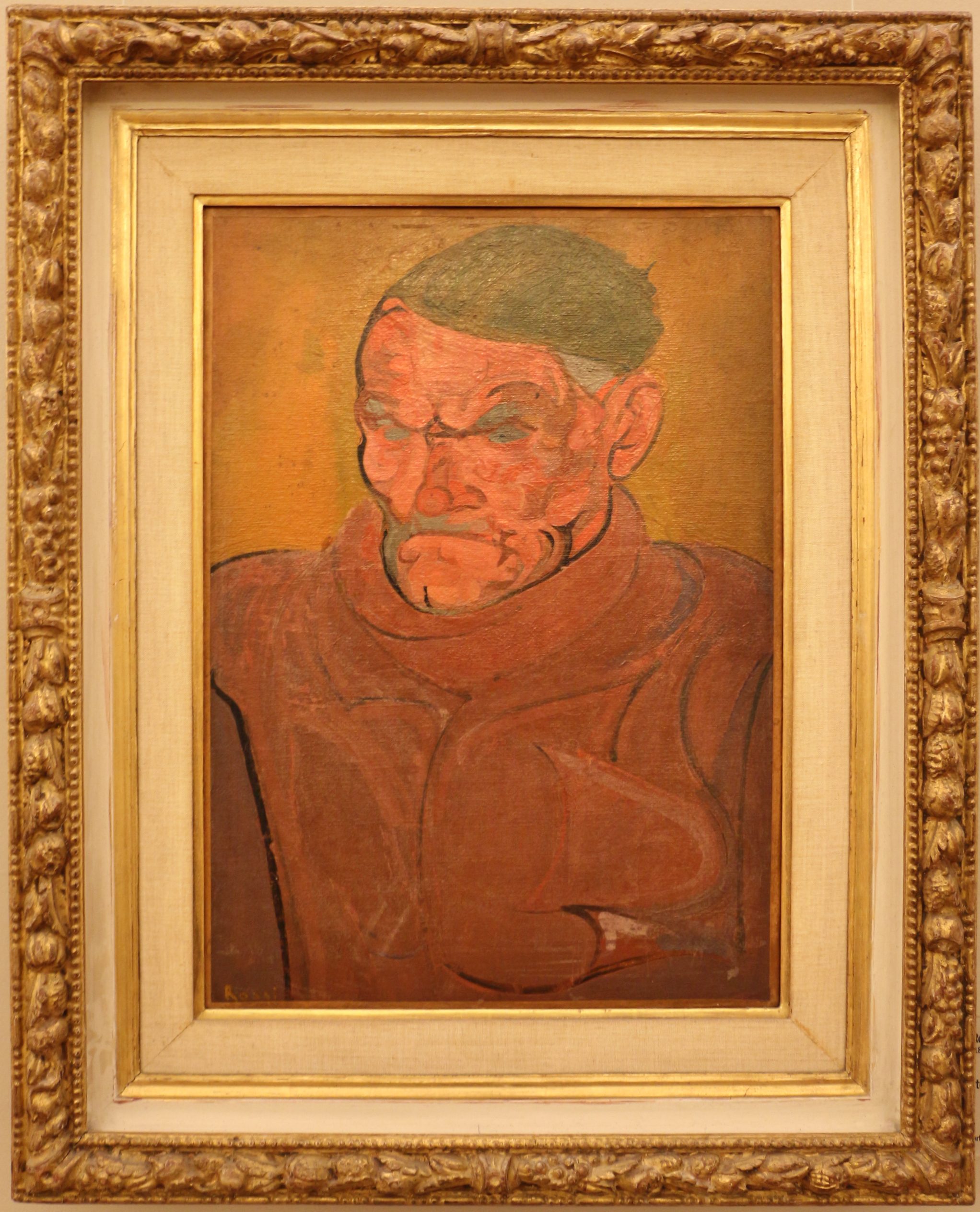
Pescatore, 1912

Gino Rossi (6 June 1884 – 16 December 1947) was an Italian painter.

== Biography ==
He was born in Venice and died in Treviso. After studying in Italy, he travelled in 1907 to Paris. In Paris, he was highly influenced by Gauguin. He exhibited at the Ca' Pesaro in 1910; his works depict brightly colored land and seascapes of Brittany and Venice.

In 1912, he returned to Paris, where he found his wife, the painter Bice Levi Minzi, had left him for the sculptor Oreste Licudis.

During World War I in 1916, he was captured as a soldier and imprisoned in Germany. Upon return to Italy, he exhibited in Verona, Torino, and Treviso.

After the war, he was afflicted with syphilis and depression. The colours in his paintings became darker. His style is more abstract and ravaged by lines.

In 1926, he was hospitalized in an asylum. In future decades, he was rehospitalized in many hospitals, including one in Gris di Mogliano.
