= Juti Ravenna =

Italian painter (1897-1972)

Ravenna
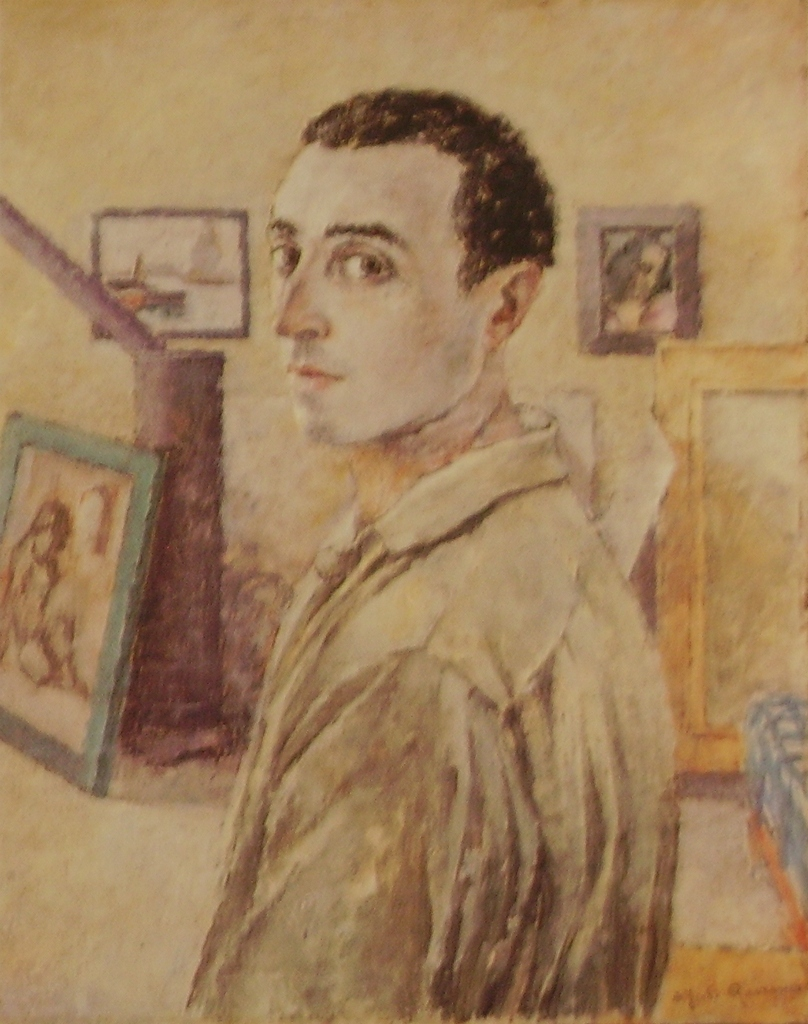
- Self-portrait
- Born: Juti; 26 December 1897; Annone Veneto
- Died: 29 April 1972 (aged 74); Treviso
- Movement: Post-Impressionism

Juti Ravenna (December 26, 1897 – April 29, 1972) was an Italian painter.

== Biography ==
Ravenna's artistic life began in 1914, with the making of some drawings. During World War I, he was at battlefront and produced some sketches, then collected and published in the autobiography "Una vita per la pittura." Thanks to a visit to Florence, during a permit, he came in contact with artistic environment and in particular with works by Ardengo Soffici which showed him the Impressionism painting. Since 1920 he moved to Venice and attended the “Accademia di Belle Arti.” He began showing in 1921, and met Gino Rossi, Enrico Fonda e Pio Semeghini who became one of his good friends and who made three different portraits of his. He began painting in Burano together with painter Seibezzi. In 1924 Nino Barbantini set up a personal exhibit of Ravenna in the ”Opera Bevilacqua La Masa show” in Ca' Pesaro.

Then he showed in the Ca' Pesaro exhibits, in the quadrennial exhibits and in the most important exhibits in Italy and abroad, also winning several prices. He also showed at Venice Biennale in 1928, 1930, 1932, 1934, 1948, 1950 and 1972.

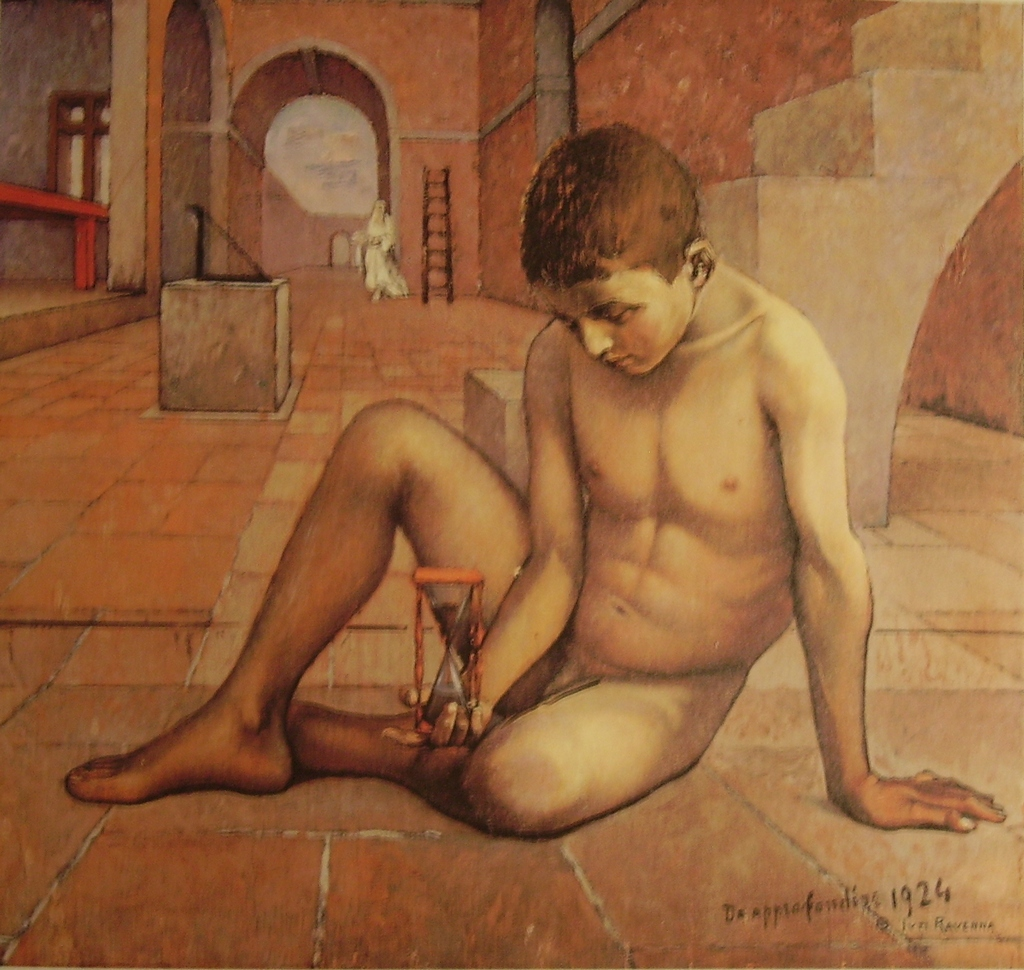
ll discepolo

"Mr Ravenna tendency in that moment was close to Venetian post-impressionism.”

During his job Ravenna constantly contributed to several magazines with texts and designs. He also helped the Italian editorial renewal and looked after the printing of some books. With the help of Egidio Bonfante in 1943, he published the book 50 disegni di Picasso, and the book Arte Cubista, two years later.

Ravenna has always been suggested by the Venetian lagoon background and in particular by Treviso lands. So in 1948 he left Venice (the attic in Palazzo Carminati) and moved to the town Treviso, which he loved, where a lot of friends of his in the cultural environment were living (Giovanni Comisso, Sante Cancian, who died in 1947, Toni Perolo, Nevra Garatti). In Treviso, he married a Cancian widow and his son Luciano was born.

In 1951, he won (together with Virgilio Guidi) the Premio Burano.

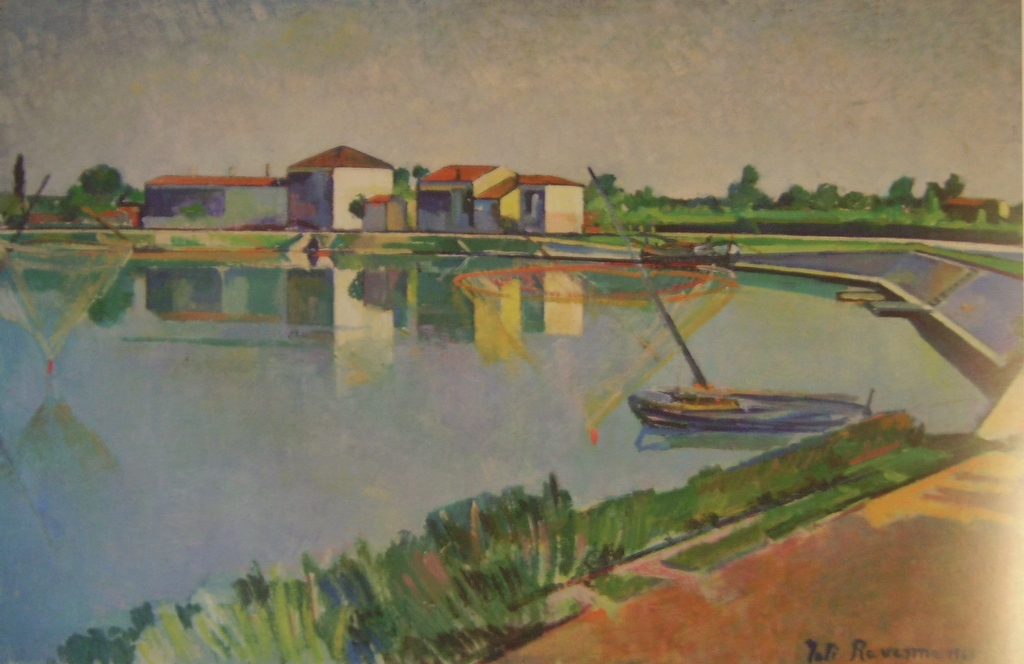
Il Sile a Casier

Later he got several rewards in Italy, including the privilege of “Commendatore della Repubblica” and the appellation “Accademico Benemerito” by the Accademia Universitaria G. Marconi in Roma due to his figurative art.

On 29 April 1972, Ravenna died at Treviso Hospital.

== Bibliography ==
- Marchiori, G. (1932). Juti Ravenna. Venezia: Ediz. Nord-Est.
- Comisso, G. (1941). "Juti Ravenna". Catalogo "Raccolta d'Arte Rimoldi", Cortina.
- Ravenna, Juti; E. Bonfante (1943). 50 disegni di Picasso. Novara: Ed. Posizione.
- Ravenna, J.; E. Bonfante (1945). Arte Cubista, con le "Meditations esthetiques sur la peinture" di G. Apollinaire. Venezia: Ed. Ateneo.
- Comisso, G. (1951). Le mie stagioni. Treviso: Ediz. di Treviso.
- De Grada, R. (16 April 1957). Juti Ravenna – Arti plastiche e figurative. Treviso: RAI TV Servizio giornalistico.
- Comisso, G. (1957). "Juti Ravenna". Catalogo della Mostra Personale Alla Galleria Barbaroux di Milano.
- Perocco, G. (1958). "Primi espositori di Ca' Pesaro". Catalogo Mostra Comune di Venezia Nel Cinquantenario Opera Bevilacqua la Masa.
- Il mercante in camera. Firenze: Vallecchi. 1959.
- Mesirca, G. (1962). "Pittura di Juti Ravenna". La Provincia di Treviso.
- Budigna, L. (1964). "Pittura di Juti Ravenna". Arte Italiana Contemporanea, la Ginestra, Firenze.
- Branzi, S. (1967). "Juti Ravenna". Arte Moderna in Italia, 1915-1935, Firenze, Palazzo Strozzi.
- Mesirca, G. (1969). Juti Ravenna, una vita per la pittura. Padova: Ed. Rebellato.
- De Grada, R. (1969). "Juti Ravenna". Informatutto, Enciclopedia Amato di Selezione, Milano.
- Pizzigoni, Vero, ed. (1970). Enciclopedia universale della pittura moderna. Milano: SEDA.
- Perocco, G. (1972). Le origini dell'arte moderna a Venezia 1908-1920. Treviso: Canova.
- Perocco, G. (1972). Catalogo della Mostra di Juti Ravenna alla Galleria S. Stefano. Venezia.
- Minassian, L. (1973). Retrospettiva di Juti Ravenna all'Opera Bevilacqua La Masa. Venezia.
- Comanducci, A.M. (1973). Dizionario illustrato dei pittori, disegnatori e incisori italiani moderni e contemporanei. Milano: Patuzzi.
- Chinaglia, D. (1976). Tesi di laurea: "Il pittore Juti Ravenna". Università degli studi di Padova.
- Bortolatto, L.; Mesirca G.; Solmi F. (October 1979). "Juti Ravenna". Catalogo della Mostra Antologica a Ca' da Noal, Treviso,, S.I.T.
- Bortolatto, L. (1980). "Juti Ravenna". Catalogo Mostra Retrospettiva per Il Ciclo Mitografie, Galleria d'Arte Palazzo Vecchio, Firenze.
- Bortolatto, L. (1983). "Artisti trevigiani della prima metà del Novecento". Catalogo Mostra Museo Civico Luigi Bailo, Treviso, ed. Zoppelli.
- Catalogo mostra "Kunst und Diktatur" nella Kuenstlerhaus di Vienna.
- Comisso, G. (1984). La mia casa di campagna", edizione speciale per il Premio Comisso Ragazzi. Milano: Longanesi & C.
- Ravenna, Juti (1988). Dialoghetto sulla pittura ed altri scritti d'arte. A cura di G. Mesirca, con postfazione di Vittorio Sgarbi. Montebelluna (TV): Amadeus.
- Giuriati, G.; G. Bianchi (1988). "Diario di guerra" con disegni di Ravenna, prefazione di Comisso e uno scritto di Naldini. Milano: Libri Scheiwiller.
- Goldin, M. (1990). "Pittura a Treviso tra le due guerre", catalogo della mostra a Palazzo Sarcinelli, Conegliano. Treviso: Marini Ed.
- Goldin, M. (September 1992). "Juti Ravenna, dipinti 1920-1950", catalogo della mostra a Ca' dei Carraresi. Treviso: Marini Ed.
- Batacchi, F. (1997). "Juti Ravenna", catalogo della mostra al Municipio di Annone Veneto, in occasione del centenario della nascita. Treviso: FG Tipolitografia.
- Manzato, E.; G. Bianchi. Artisti veneti del '900, il lascito Luccini 1997, Museo Civico Bailo. Treviso: Zoppelli.
- Camatel, M. (1998). Tesi di laurea: "Juti Ravenna pittore". Università degli studi di Venezia "Cà Foscari".
- Manzato, E. (October 2009). Il paesaggio nella pittura del '900, Museo del Paesaggio, Torre di Mosto. Venezia: Cicero Editore.
- Cecchetto, S.; G. Bianchi (March 2010). Memorie di Paesaggio – Il Veneto felice nei suoi pittori del Novecento, Mira (Ve). Ed. Posizione.
