= The Japanese Art Society of America =

The Japanese Art Society of America (JASA) promotes the study and appreciation of Japanese art. Founded in 1973 as the Ukiyo-e Society of America by collectors of Japanese prints, the society's mission has expanded to include related fields of Japanese art.

== History ==
While the society now addresses all aspects of Japanese art and culture, it traces its origins to a small group of ukiyo-e print collectors in and around New York City in 1973, at a time when Parke-Bernet Galleries (later to merge with Sotheby's) had begun to develop a market for Japanese art. The first major auction was the 1969 sale of the Blanche McFetridge estate, consisting of ukiyo-e prints once owned by Frank Lloyd Wright, followed by the 1972 sale of the estate of Hans Popper, a Viennese businessman who spent time working in Japan. His collection included masterpieces by Harunobu, Utamaro, Sharaku, and Hokusai, and the sale attracted many of the great collectors and dealers of the era, including Richard Pillsbury Gale (1900–1973) in Minnesota, Felix Tikotin (1893–1986), a dealer living in Switzerland, and Nishi Saiju (1927–1995), the first Japanese dealer to attend a sale in the United States.

JASA entered its fourth decade under the direction of Joan Baekeland as president and the long-time Chicago collector George Mann as vice president. The current president is Dr. Susan Peters. Today, JASA has some 400 members from countries around the world, including Japan.

== Activities ==
Through its annual lectures, seminars, and other events, the society provides a forum for the exchange of ideas and experiences about the traditional and contemporary arts of Japan.

The Society also sponsors exhibitions, such as Designed for Pleasure: The World of Edo Japan in Prints and Paintings, 1680–1860, which was shown at the Asia Society in New York City in Spring 2008.

== Programs and publications ==
Programs for members and the public remain the focus of the Society: in 2009, for example, members had tea in the Japanese teahouse at Kykuit, the Rockefeller estate in Pocantico Hills near Tarrytown, New York; visited private and public collections in Sacramento and San Francisco; and toured the Richard Fishbein and Estelle Bender Collection as well as the mini-museum of the Mary Griggs Burke Collection in New York City. Lecture programs in New York are held at the New York University Institute of Fine Arts and elsewhere.

The programs and publications of the Society were valuable in the 1970s, when ukiyo-e studies and, for that matter, Edo period art history had scarcely entered the academic mainstream either in the United States or Japan.

The society publishes a quarterly newsletter for members as well as an annual journal, Impressions. (ISSN 1095-2136) Impressions was the recipient of the 2009 Donald Keene Prize for the Promotion of Japanese Culture, awarded by the Donald Keene Center, Columbia University.
