= Harunobu =

- Gender: Male

Origin
- Origin: Japanese
- Meaning: Different meanings depending on the kanji used

Harunobu (written: 春信 or 晴信) is a masculine Japanese given name. Notable people with the name include:

- Arima Harunobu (有馬 晴信) (1567–1612), Japanese daimyō
- Harunobu Deno (出野 晴信) (born 1969), Japanese fencer
- Suzuki Harunobu (鈴木 春信) (1725–1770), Japanese Ukiyo-e artist
- Harunobu Yonenaga (米長 晴信) (born 1965), Japanese politician
- Takeda Shingen (1521 –1573), Japanese daimyō who was referred to as Harunobu (晴信) throughout his life.

== See also ==
- Harunobu (crater), crater on Mercury
