= Harunobu (crater) =

Crater on Mercury

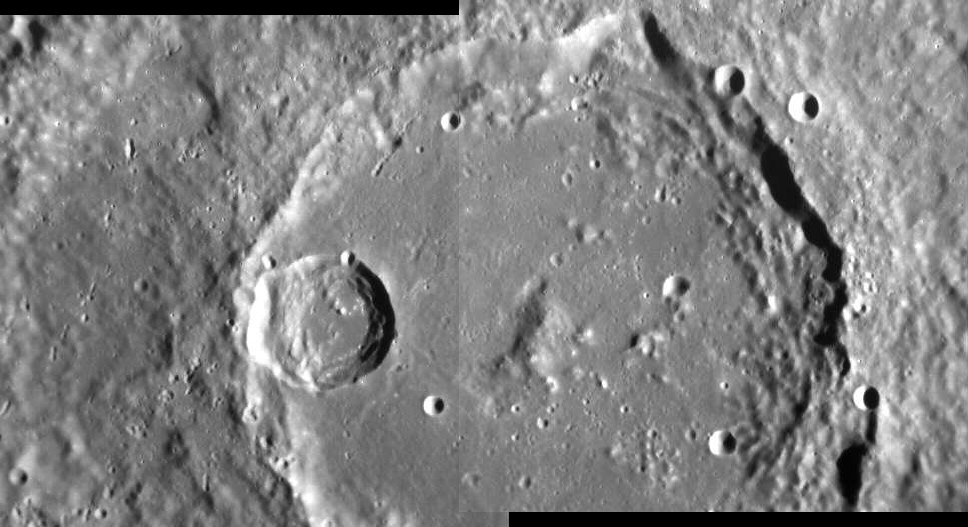
- MESSENGER NAC mosaic of Harunobu
- Feature type: Central-peak impact crater
- Location: Beethoven quadrangle, Mercury
- Coordinates: 14.88°N 140.93°W
- Diameter: 107 km (66 mi)
- Eponym: Suzuki Harunobu

Harunobu is a crater on Mercury. It has a diameter of 107 kilometers. Its name was adopted by the International Astronomical Union in 1976. Harunobu is named for the Japanese artist Suzuki Harunobu, who lived from 1720 or 1724 to 1770.

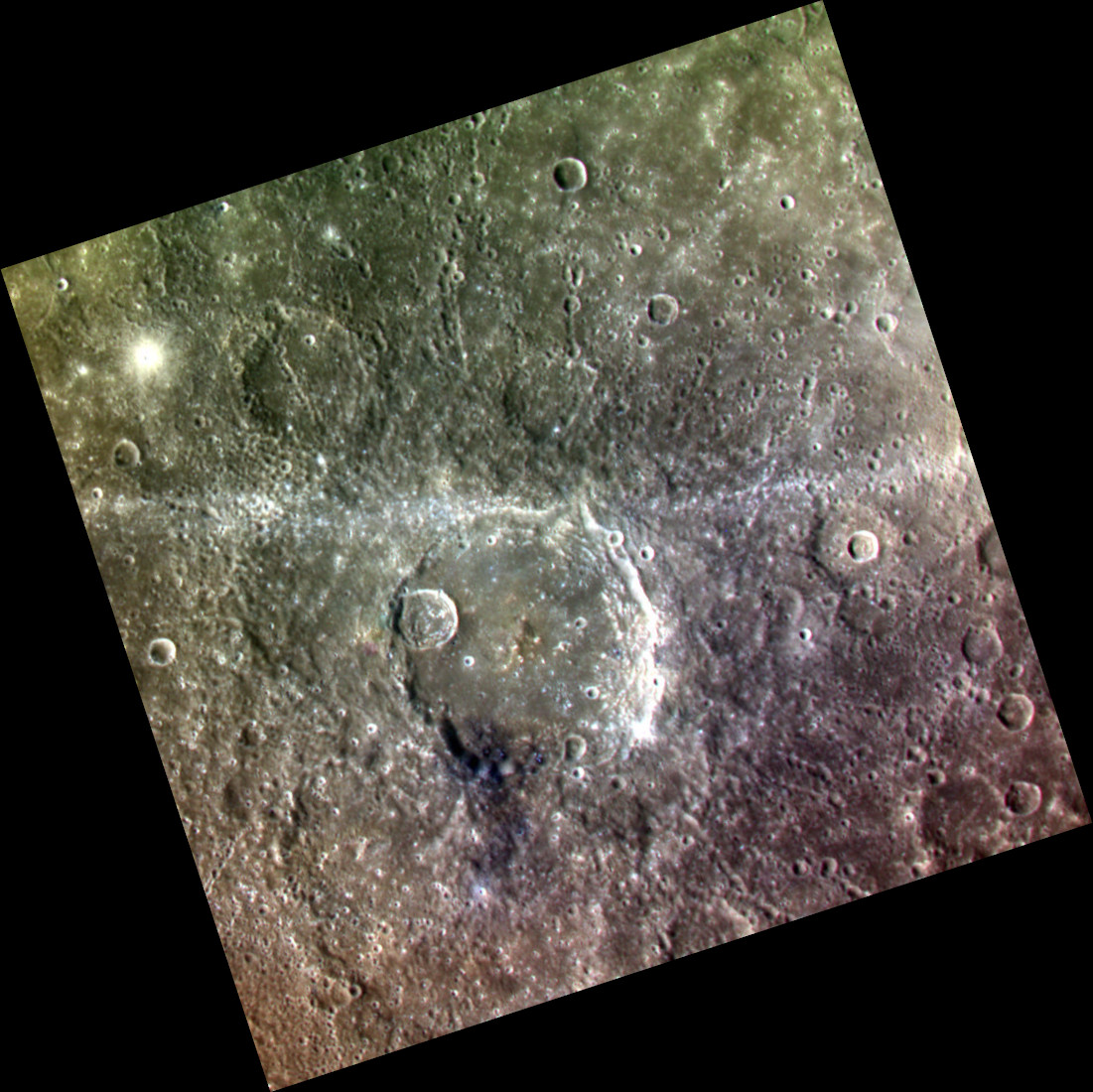
Exaggerated color image of Harunobu and vicinity. Note the very dark material in the southwestern part of the crater.

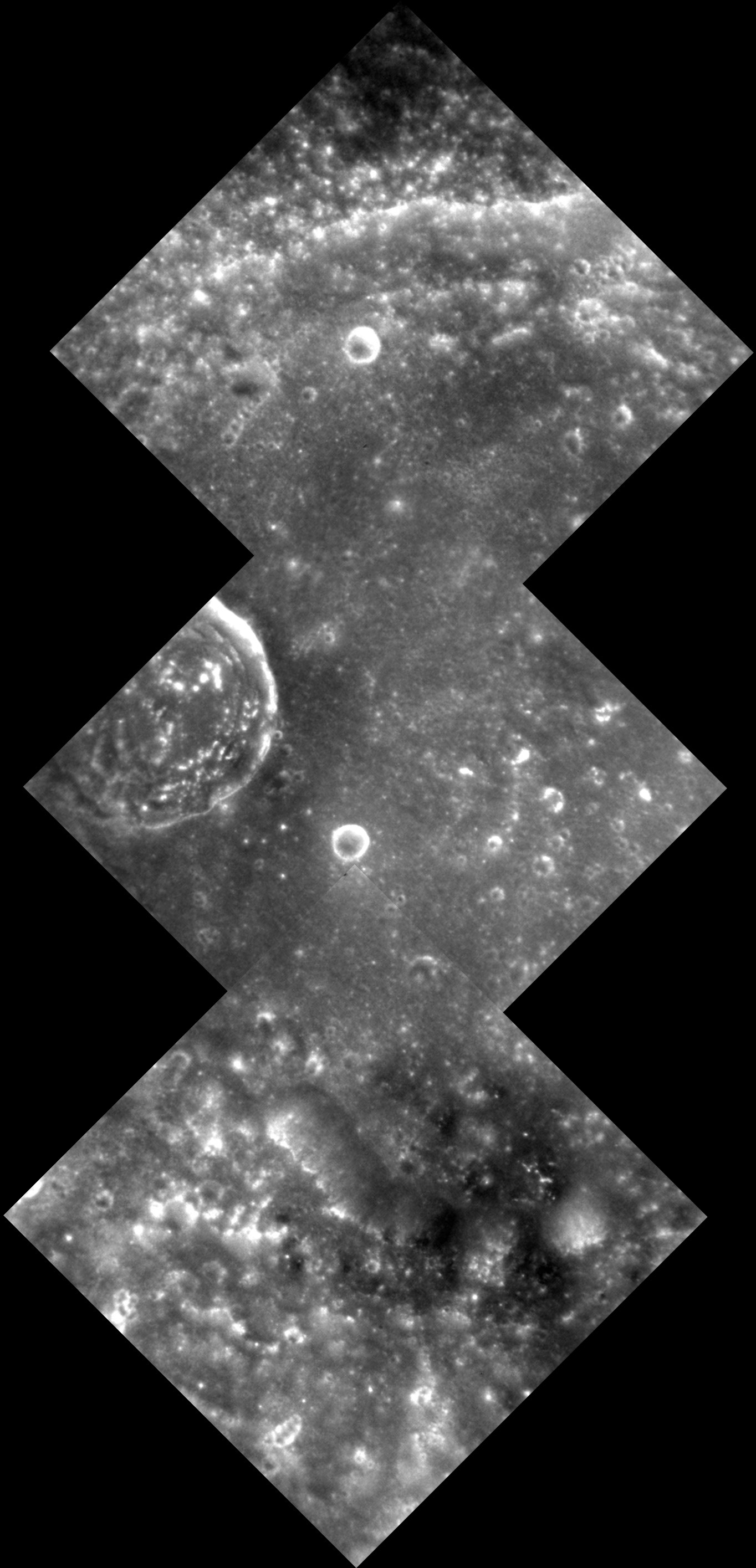
Detail of Harunobu
