= Gennaro Favai =

Italian painter

Gennaro Favai (1879–1958) was an Italian artist.

== Biography ==
Gennaro Favai was born in Venice in 1879, son of Luigi Favai and contessa Teresa Albrizzi. In his formative years Favai studied the old masters; the Dutch and Spanish schools of the seventeenth century, the English school of the eighteenth century, and the French school of the nineteenth century (Borgmeyer 1912). Around 1895, shortly after enrolling in the Accademia di Belle Arti di Venezia, Favai was expelled. He continued to study under Vittore Zanetti Zilla, and formed a long lasting friendship with Mario de Maria. In 1898 Favai first exhibited work in the Società Promotrice Firenze, Firenze, Italy. Favai received increasing exposure through the 1904 St Louis Exposition, in the Paris Salon Société Nationale des Beaux-Arts 1905 exposition, and the 1907 Venice Biennale. In 1912, art critic Charles Louis Borgmeyer wrote an article on Favai’s early works in the Fine Arts Journal (Borgmeyer 1912).

Favai lived in Taormina and Syracuse from 1915 through 1917, followed by Capri in 1919. The exposure to these environs are central to his development of a new expression of landscape. Representation of this period is presented in the works published under the title Costa amalfitana: 50 disegni (Favai 1925) and 56 disegni dell'isola di Capri nel 1930 (Favai 1930). Favai continued to work until his death in 1958.

His works have been thematically divided into three main groups: The Venetian Views, The Core, and The Birds Eye View. The first theme, referred to as the Venetian views are composed of street scenes and Venetian nightlife. Second theme, The Core, is heavily influenced Favai’s travels between the Amalfi Coast, Taormina, Syracuse, Capri, Rome, and Algiers. The exposure of these trips resulted in a new expression of the landscape and is marked by intense colors and strong contrasts between light and dark. The last theme, “The Birds Eye View,” is represented by overviews and cityscapes of Venice.

Favai was friends with the American poet Ezra Pound. Pound's daughter, Mary de Rachewiltz, gives us a very personal view of him and his wife Maria in her book Discretions (New York: New Directions, 1975). The scenes she recounts were those of early to mid-1930s: "Maria had a very heavy figure, always clad in black, and a very heavy Dutch accent. She was a poetess and her husband, Gennaro, a Venetian painter – a striking contrast: tall, thin, vivacious, in a dazzling white suit and with an enormous white beard and crinkly hair standing upright. His black eyes and his tongue were always active, except when he and Babbo [Ezra Pound] played chess – absorbed in their game for hours on a rainy afternoon, or evenings. I loved going to their house with Babbo, a big studio in Campo Sant Agnese, filled with heavy furniture, books and his own curious paintings: pale-coloured, misty landscapes, mostly views of Venice. I would be given art books to look at, and shown Maria's wonderful collection of teaspoons: the handles were topped by lacy windmills. Gennaro always greeted us loudly in Venetian at the top of the stairs and as soon as I was within reach he kissed me on the head: Che bei capei che bei capei, che bea putea. The usual Venetian refrain." (p. 97)

== Exhibitions ==
2012 - Museo del Paesaggio / Utopia del Sembiant: Il Paesaggio nei paesaggi

2012 - Ca’ Pesaro International Gallery of Modern Art / Gennaro Favai: visioni e orizzonti 1879-1958

2015 - Palazzo Roverella / Il Demone Della Modernità
