= De Nittis =

De Nittis is an Italian surname. Notable people with the surname include:

- Francesco De Nittis (1933–2014), Italian Roman Catholic archbishop and diplomat
- Giuseppe De Nittis (1846–1884), Italian painter
