= Tognini =

Tognini is an Italian surname. Notable people with the surname include:

- Franco Tognini (1907–1980), Italian gymnast
- Michel Tognini (born 1949), French test pilot

== See also ==
- Luigi Antognini
