= Casorati =

Casorati is an Italian surname. Notable people with the surname include:

- Felice Casorati (mathematician) (1835–1890), Italian mathematician
- Felice Casorati (1883–1963), Italian painter, sculptor, and printmaker
