= Guido Marussig =

Italian painter

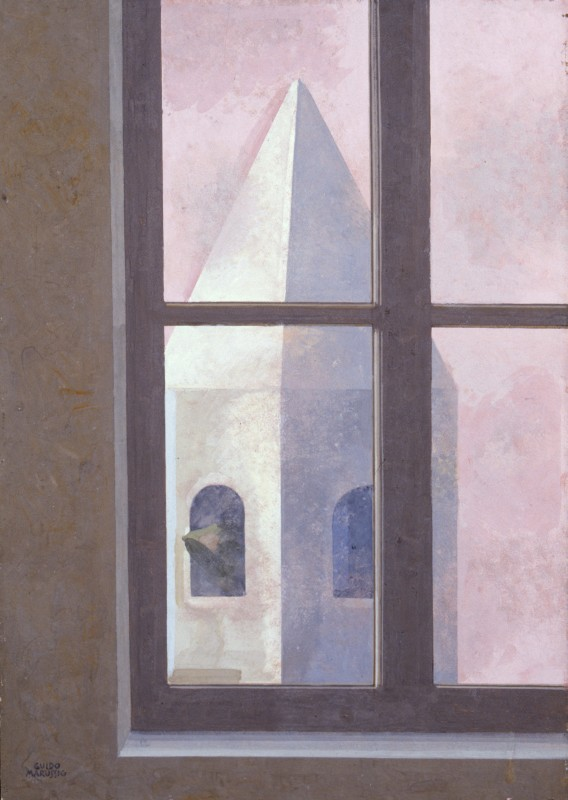
Campanile, c. 1963 (Fondazione Cariplo)

Guido Marussig (1885–1972) was an Italian painter.

== Biography ==
He was born in Trieste, Italy. After his initial training at the Scuola Industriale Triestina, Guido Marussig moved to Venice to attend the Academy of Fine Arts thanks to a scholarship from Trieste City Council. In 1905 he participated in the Esposizione Internazionale d'Arte di Venezia, and was to continue to do so in the following years. He was a Symbolist painter influenced by the work of the Vienna Secession, and particularly the art of Gustav Klimt, and he also experimented with engraving techniques. He contributed illustrations to the magazine L'Eroica and from 1918 to 1937 he taught at the Scuola del Libro in Milan, where he had moved in 1916.

In 1921 he participated in designing and decorating D'Annunzio's Vittoriale; he had already designed the sets for his tragedy La nave. Towards the end of the decade he became a member of the Novecento Italiano group, whose poetics also influenced later works such as the mosaic Justice Entering the Courtroom (1939) in the Palazzo di Giustizia in Milan. During subsequent decades his paintings acquired an ever greater degree of geometric abstraction, while he continued to work as a set designer and to contribute to various art periodicals. He designed the sets for the first opera production at the Teatro alla Scala in Milan following its reconstruction after bombing during the Second World War. Verdi's Nabucco opened on 26 December 1946.

Marussig died in Gorizia in 1972.

== Other projects ==
Media related to Guido Marussig at Wikimedia Commons
