= Alberto Martini =

Italian painter (1876–1954)

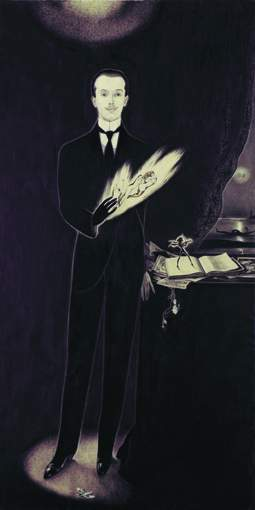
Self-portrait, 1911, mixed media

Alberto Martini (November 24, 1876 – November 8, 1954) was an Italian painter, engraver, illustrator and graphic designer. Critics have described Martini's range of work from "elegant and epic" to "grotesque and macabre" and consider him one of the precursors of Surrealism.

== Early life ==
Martini was born in Oderzo, Veneto and received his early training in drawing and painting from his father, who was a portrait painter and a professor of drawing at the Istituto Tecnico in Treviso.

== Career ==
Much of his career was spent illustrating famous literary works. In 1895 he began the first series of illustrations for Luigi Pulci's Morgante Maggiore and for Alessandro Tassoni's La secchia rapita. During this time he had his first exhibit which was a series of fourteen paintings from the anthology La corte dei miracoli at the Venice Biennale in 1897, where his drawings of beggars were described as "picturesquely grotesque". In 1898 he moved to Monaco and worked as an illustrator for the magazines Dekorative Kunst and "Jugend". In 1901 he illustrated an edition of La Divina Commedia. Beginning in July 1905, he produced 132 ink illustrations, which were described as "macabre", for the stories of Edgar Allan Poe which he worked on until 1909 and "inaugurated a period of great creative intensity within the graphics of literary inspiration." His work was clearly influenced by such artists as Albrecht Dürer, Urs Graf, Pieter Bruegel, Lucas Cranach, Albrecht Altdorfer, and Joseph Sattler whose work he had studied.

Le cortège de Vénus 1949

In 1907, he had his first solo show in London and met the publisher William Heinemann who went on to use some of Martini's illustrations. The death of his father in 1910, brought him back to Italy where he moved with his mother to a country home near Treviso. There he continued to illustrate great literary works such as Shakespeare's Hamlet and poems for Paul Verlaine. From 1915 to 1920 he devoted time to painting, mostly pastels, in the theme of woman-butterfly and did a series of "elegant" lithographs titled Farfalle (Butterflies) which were good examples of his proto-Surrealism.

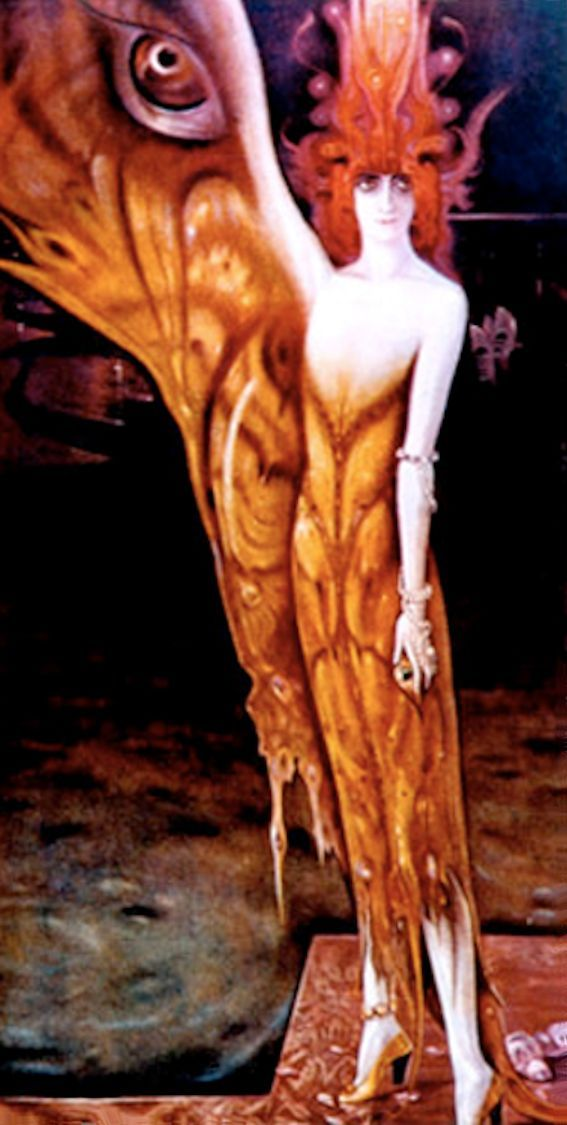
Casati 1912

At the outbreak of World War I, Martini designed a series of "frightening" propaganda postcards called Danza Macabra Europea, to be distributed to the allies against the Austro-Hungarian empire. From 1912 to 1923 he continued to illustrate literary works and was commissioned to paint Marchesa Luisa Casati, Countess Revedin and Paola D'Ostheim and others. He continued to have many exhibits in London, Liverpool, Bologna, Milan and at the Venice Biennale. In 1923, he wrote Vita d'artista. He had innovative ideas about theater and set design which he illustrated and published in the book Il Tetiteatro in 1923. The next year he met and married artist Maria Petringa and she became a source of inspiration for many of his works.

== Later years ==
He became disappointed and resentful toward Italian critics who, in the late twenties, seemed to ignore his work so he moved to Paris in 1928. From 1929 to 1934 he produced a large number of paintings, which he called "paintings with the colors of the sky". Although his wife remained in Italy, they corresponded and saw each other periodically and he returned to Italy in 1934. Around 1940 he published a satirical journal, Perseus, with drawings and cartoons. In 1946 he was awarded a diploma of honor by the Museum of Fine Arts in Nancy. He did a series of lithographs for Life of the Virgin and other poems by Rainer Maria Rilke which he finished in 1952. Alberto Martini continued to paint "with considerable expressive effect" until the end. He died in Milan on November 8, 1954.

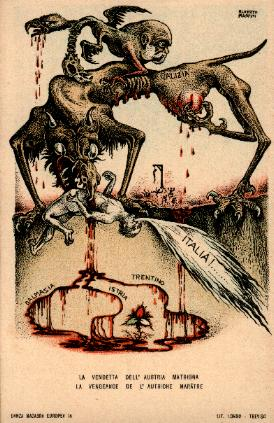
propaganda postcard ca.1914
