= Corrente di Vita =

Italian culture magazine

Corrente di Vita was a biweekly Italian culture magazine published between 1938 and 1940.

== Magazine ==
In 1938 artist Ernesto Treccani founded the magazine Vita Giovanile with the financial backing of his father, Senator Giovanni Treccani. Initially a monthly and then a biweekly publication, the magazine later changed its name to Corrente di Vita Giovanile and finally Corrente. Treccani envisioned the magazine as an independent venture free from the directives of the GUF (University Fascist Group). Corrente quickly became a point of reference for Italian anti-fascist culture in the late 1930s, putting forward a democratic alternative to the official guidelines of the Ministry of Popular Culture, and strongly criticizing more regime-aligned art movements such as the Novecento Italiano and late Futurism.

On June 10, 1940, the Fascist regime successfully closed Corrente when Italy entered World War II. After the closure of the magazine, the Corrente editorial activities continued until 1943 with the publication of Edizioni di Corrente – a collection of books that included I lirici greci by Salvatore Quasimodo, I lirici spagnoli by Carlo Bo, Frontiera by Vittorio Sereni, Occhio quadrato by Alberto Lattuada – and with exhibitions at the Bottega di Corrente gallery, in Via della Spiga 9, around which gravitated cultural and political figures in opposition to the government.

== The Corrente Movement ==
The Corrente Movement covered different fields and disciplines – film, theater, literature, poetry and visual arts – bringing together some of the brightest intellectual forces of the time, including Luciano Anceschi, Giulio Carlo Argan, Antonio Banfi, Piero Bigongiari, Luigi Comencini, Raffaele De Grada, Dino Del Bo, Giansiro Ferrata, Carlo Emilio Gadda, Alfonso Gatto, Beniamino Joppolo, Eugenio Montale, Duilio Morosini, Enzo Paci, Vasco Pratolini, Luigi Rognoni, Umberto Saba, Vittorio Sereni, Giancarlo Vigorelli and Elio Vittorini.

The artists associated to Corrente perpetuated an art replete with humane and moral content, in full opposition to the one supported by the fascist regime. They tended decisively towards expressionist visual forms, and referenced the Scuola Romana, as well as European artists such as Vincent van Gogh, James Ensor, Chaïm Soutine and Pablo Picasso, and movements like Fauves, Nabis and Die Brücke. The group organised debates, round-table discussions and exhibitions, bringing in artists like Renato Birolli, Giuseppe Migneco, Bruno Cassinari, Renato Guttuso, Aligi Sassu and Ennio Morlotti. In doing so, the Corrente Movement became a hub for a generation of intellectuals and artists who wished to establish an intellectual bridge to Europe, and who saw ethics and the role of the artist in society as the key to a substantial renewal in Italian culture.

== The Corrente Exhibitions ==
The first Corrente exhibition was held in March 1939 at the Society for Fine Arts and Permanent Exhibition Museum in Milan. It featured works by Renato Birolli, Italo Valenti, Arnaldo Badodi, Giuseppe Migneco, Sandro Cherchi, Dino Lanaro, Bruno Cassinari, Alfredo Mantica, Luigi Grosso, Giacomo Manzù, Gabriele Mucchi, Domenico Cantatore, Fiorenzo Tomea, Genni, Filippo Tallone and Gastone Panciera. Some “modernist” exponents of the Milanese art scene such as Carlo Carrà, Arturo Tosi, Ugo Bernasconi, Piero Marussig, Cesare Monti, Arturo Martini, Francesco Messina and Luigi Bartolini were also invited.

The second Corrente exhibition took place in December 1939. Notable additions to the group were Mario Mafai, Nino Franchina, Luigi Broggini, Piero Prampolini, Antonio Filippini, Mauro Reggiani, Giuseppe Santomaso, Orfeo Tamburi, Pericle Fazzini, Mirko Basaldella, Afro Basaldella, Luigi Montanarini, Domenico Caputi, Fausto Pirandello. Aldo Salvadori, Piero Martina, Sandro Cherchi and Lucio Fontana.

== See also ==
- Return to order
- Decadent movement
- Hermeticists

== Bibliography ==
- (in English) Ruth Ben-Ghiat, Fascist Modernities: Italy, 1922–1945, University of California Press, Berkeley, (2000)
- (in English) Marla Susan Stone, The Patron State: Art and Politics in Fascist Italy, Princeton University Press, New Jersey, (1998)
- (in English) Roderick Conway Morris, "Italy's Radical Return to Order", in The New York Times, 26 December 1998
- (in Italian) Raffaele De Grada, Il movimento di Corrente, Edizioni del Milione, Milan, 1952
- (in Italian) Enrico Crispolti, Vittorio Fagone, Cesare Ruju Brandi, Corrente: cultura e società 1938–1942: omaggio a Edoardo Persico 1900–1936, Centro di Iniziativa Culturale del Mezzogiorno, Naples, 1979
- (in Italian) Elena Pontiggia, Il movimento di Corrente, Abscondita, Milan, 2012
- (in Italian) Giovannella Desideri, Antologia della rivista "Corrente", with contributions by Ernesto Treccani, Giansiro Ferrata and Alberto Lattuada, Guida, Naples, 1979
- (in Italian) Ernesto Treccani, Arte per amore. Scritti e pagine di diario, Feltrinelli, Milan, 1978
- (in Italian) Duilio Morosini, L’arte degli anni difficili, Editori Riuniti, Rome, 1985
- (in Italian) Mario De Micheli, Raffaele De Grada, Corrente: il movimento di arte e cultura, Milan, 1985
- (in Italian) Gabriele Mucchi, Le occasioni perdute: memorie 1899–1993, L'Archivolto, Milan, 1994
- (in Italian) Renato Guttuso, Mestiere di pittore, De Donato editore, Bari, 1972
- (in Italian) Zeno Birolli, Gianfranco Bruno, Annamaria Brizio, Paolo Rusconi, Renato Birolli. Anni trenta Milano e Roma, Archivio di Scuola Romana, Rome, 1997
- (in Italian) Raffaele De Grada, La grande stagione, Anthelios, Milan, 2001
