= Ernesto Treccani =

Italian painter (1920–2009)

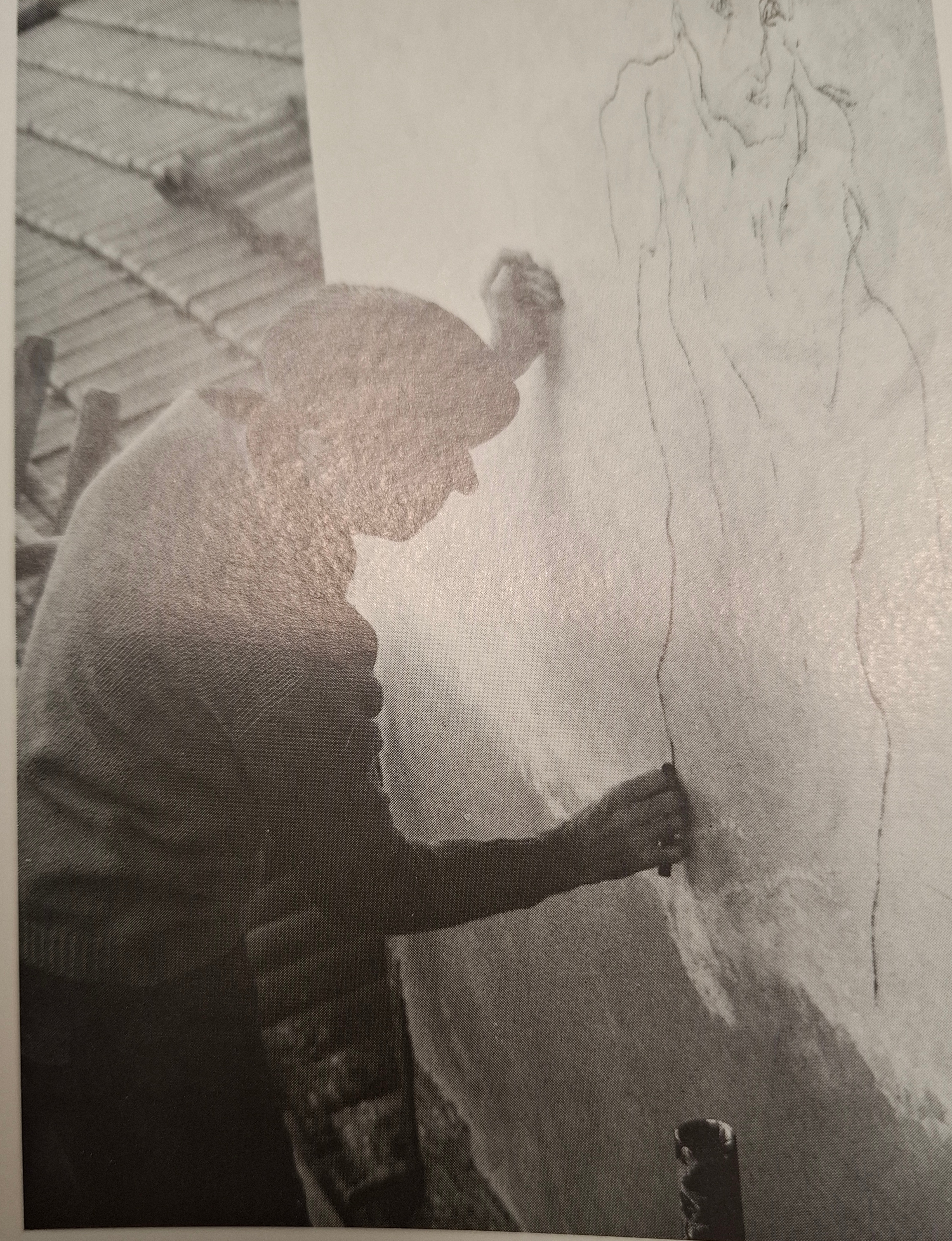
Ernesto Treccani in Arcumeggia, 1974

Ernesto Treccani (Milan, 26 August 1920 – Milan, 27 November 2009) was a visual artist, writer and political activist.

== Biography ==
Treccani was born in Milan. Very early, he joined the art avant-garde groups and movements opposed to Fascist culture. At only 18 he founded and edited the magazine Corrente di Vita, and exhibited his work at Galleria Bottega di Corrente with Renato Birolli, Renato Guttuso, Giuseppe Migneco, Aligi Sassu and later at Galleria della Spiga with Bruno Cassinari and Ennio Morlotti.

Treccani's first solo exhibition was held in 1949 at the Galleria Il Milione in Milan, where he exhibited many times during his artistic path. After his experience with the Italian resistance movement during World War II, he continued his artistic career as leader of the "Pittura" Group and editor of art magazines such as Il 45 and Realismo, together with Raffaele De Grada. In the 1950s his works was selected for the 25th Venice Biennale, as well as for the exhibition on the New Realists held at the Leicester Galleries in London and in New York, where he had a solo show at the Heller Gallery.
During this period the subjects of his paintings were influenced by Calabria's rural society and by the urban industrial landscape of Milan and Paris.

From the 1960s on, Treccani's prolific works and multiple initiatives demonstrated his continuous commitment to art and culture. Among the works of this period, there are five large paintings inspired by Pavese’s La luna e i falò (1962–63), the cycle of works Da Melissa a Valenza (1964–65), and the series of watercolors inspired by a trip to Cuba. In 1976, major exhibitions of his work were held in Volgograd, at Pushkin Museum in Moscow and at Hermitage in Saint Petersburg. He held also many solo exhibitions in art galleries and museums in Paris, Berlin, Amsterdam, Barcelona, Stuttgart and São Paulo.

Treccani then developed the various features of his artistic research along parallel lines, continuing to work and exhibit in towns and cities in Italy and abroad, and alternating this “nomadic” activity with regular and creative stays in Macugnaga and Forte dei Marmi. In 1978 he founded Fondazione Corrente, a center for cultural events, exhibitions and cultural debates, as well as a center for the collection and study of documents related to Realism.

Treccani was also an accomplished writer and poet; Some of his books include Arte per amore, Il segreto dell’arte and Un poco di fiele: poesie e disegni (1940–1970).

In 1989 the City of Milan held a major retrospective exhibition on the artist at the Royal Palace. Another large retrospective of his works was held at Foundation Bandera in Busto Arsizio in 2003.

In 2004 he created the cycle of large windows Energia, luci e colori. They were exhibited in Lugano, Riga, Budapest and Prague. In 2006 the town of Forte dei Marmi organized the exhibition Le mutazioni del realismo - Opere inedite 2003-06 at the Fortino. In 2009 another large retrospective exhibition of Treccani's work inaugurated the renovated rooms of Palazzo Barberini in Montichiari, just a few months before his death.

== Legacy ==
In December 2009, during the 40th anniversary of the Piazza Fontana bombing, Treccani's painting Un popolo di volti was exhibited at the Royal Palace in Milan. In March 2011, the same venue exhibited the painting Le cinque giornate di Milano on the occasion of the 150th anniversary of the unification of Italy. Le parole e la pittura. Ernesto Treccani incontra la poesia, l’epica, il romanzo, Treccani's first posthumous retrospective exhibition, was held at the Pinacoteca Civica of Savona and in 2013 La materia e la luce. Vetri, ceramiche e smalti di Ernesto Treccani at Fondazione Corrente in Milan.

== List of Major Public Collections ==
Puškin Museum, Moscow, Russia
Museo del Novecento, Milano, Italy
Museo della Permanente, Milano, Italy
Studio Treccani, Fondazione Corrente, Milano, Italy
Polo Museale Santa Chiara, San Gimignano, Italy
MAGA, Museo d'arte di Gallarate, Gallarate (VA), Italy
Museo Palazzo Ricci, Macerata, Italy
Fondazione Cesare Pavese, Santo Stefano Belbo, CN, Italy
Galleria civica di arte contemporanea, Copparo, FE, Italy
Galleria civica d'arte moderna e contemporanea, Latina, RM, Italy
Museo civico, Montecarotto, AN, Italy
MdAO, Museo d'arte di Avellino, Italy
Museo d'arte sacra, San Gabriele di Isola del Gran Sasso d'Italia, Italy
Museo Civico di Villa Groppallo, Vado Ligure, Italy
Museo Civico della Paleontologia, Lizzano, Italy

== Bibliography ==
Vittorio Fagone, Corrente, reprint gennaio 1938-maggio 1940, La nuova foglio, Pollenza, 1978
Marco Valsecchi, Gli artisti di Corrente, Edizioni di Comunità, Milano 1963
Mario De Micheli, Ernesto Treccani, Edizioni del Milione, Milano 1962/> Duilio Morosini, Ernesto Treccani, Milano, Edizioni del Milione, 1949
John Berger, Realist Painters of La Colonna, The Leicester Galleries, London, 1956
First American Exhibition of Paintings by Ernesto Treccani, John Heller Gallery, New York, 1957
Raffaele De Grada, Mostra antologica di Ernesto Treccani, Casa Municipale della Cultura, Livorno, 1958
Retrospective exhibition of Ernesto Treccani. 150 paintings, Puškin Museum, Moscow, 1976
Retrospective exhibition of Ernesto Treccani. 150 paintings, Hermitage, St. Petersburg, 1976
Treccani. Peintures 1975-79, Galerie Béneézit, Paris, 1979
Ernesto Treccani. Malerei. Graphik. Plastik, Ausstellung der Neunen Berliner Galerie im Alten Museum, Berlin, 1982
Ernesto Treccani, Galleria Forni, Amsterdam, 1982
Ernesto Treccani, Real Circulo Artistico Don Quijote de la Mancha, Barcelona, 1987
Ernesto Treccani, Galerie Moderne Italienische Kunst, Stuttgart, 1986
Ernesto Treccani, Paço Des Artes, São Paulo, 1988
Antonio Negri, Studio Museo Treccani, Edizioni del Leone, Venice, 1986
Ernesto Treccani, Arte per amore. Scritti e pagine di diario, Feltrinelli, Milan, 1978
Ernesto Treccani, Il segreto dell'arte, Amadeus, Maser, 1987
Ernesto Treccani, Un poco di fiele : poesie e disegni (1940-1970), Feltrinelli, Milan, 1970
Vittorio Fagone, Lamberto Vitali, Ernesto Treccani, Edizioni del Milione, Milan, 1970
Antonio Negri, Ernesto Treccani: Mostra antologica, Fabbri editore, Milan, 1989
Marina Pizziolo, Ernesto Treccani e il movimento di Corrente, Skira, Milan, 2003
Giorgio Seveso, Silvio Riolfo Marengo, Energia, luci e colori. Le vetrate di Ernesto Treccani, Italian Institute of Culture, Budapest and Prague, 2006
Raffaele De Grada, Ernesto Treccani. Le mutazioni del realismo, opere inedite 2003-2006, Il Fortino, Forte dei Marmi, 2006
Marina Pizziolo, Corrente, le parole della vita. Opere 1930-1945, Skira, Milan, 2008
Giorgio Seveso, Ernesto Treccani, Arte per amore. Dalle poetiche del realismo alla poesia della realtà, Grafo Edizioni, Montichiari, 2009
Giorgio Seveso (a cura di), Le parole e la pittura. Ernesto Treccani incontra la poesia, l’epica, il romanzo, catalogo della mostra, Pinacoteca Civica di Savona, 2011
Maddalena Muzio Treccani, Silvio Riolfo Marengo, Giorgio Seveso, La materia e la luce. Vetri, ceramiche e smalti di Ernesto Treccani, Fondazione Corrente, Milan, 2013

== See also ==
- Corrente di Vita
