= Giuseppe Migneco =

Italian painter

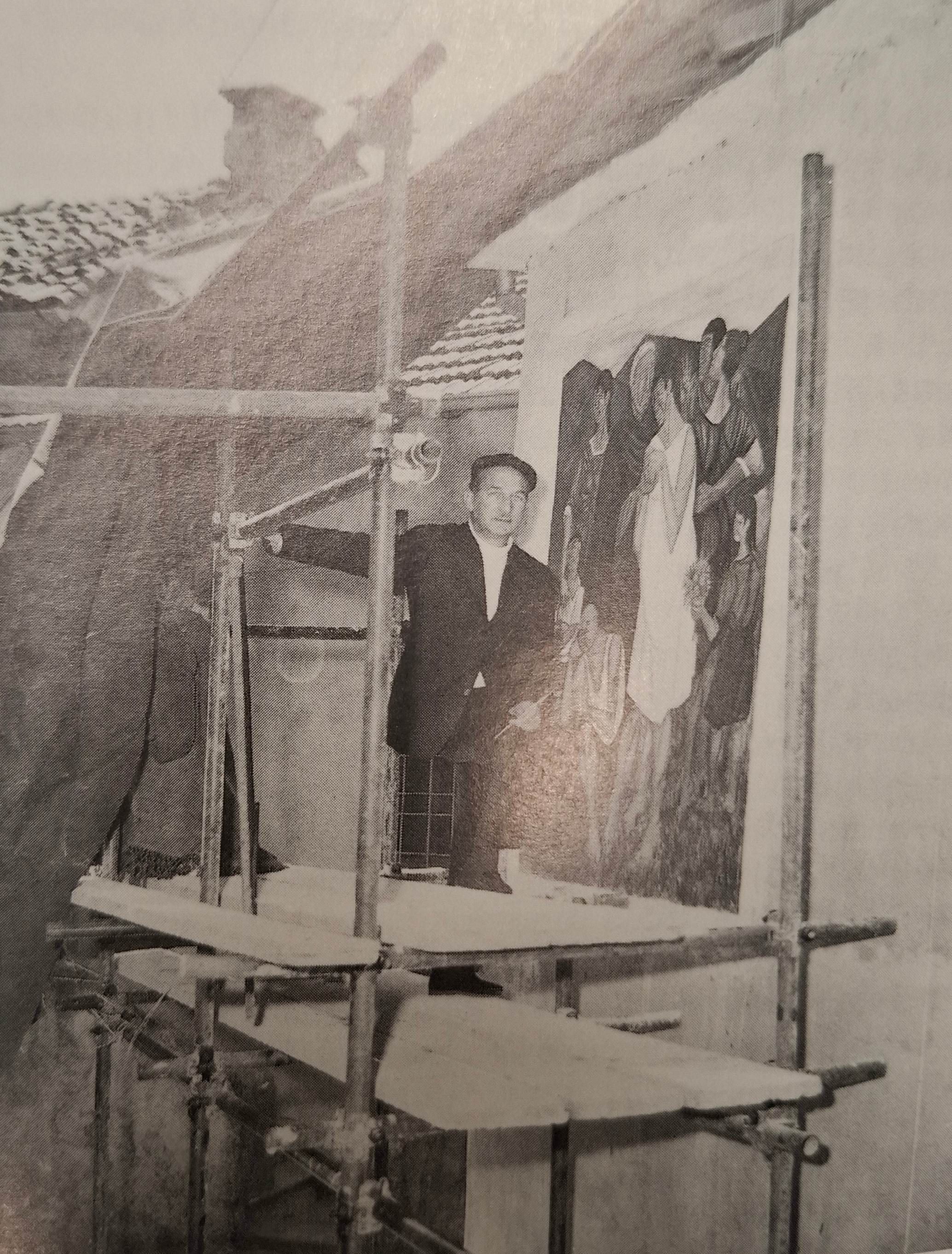
Giuseppe Migneco in Arcumeggia, 1962

Giuseppe Migneco (1908–1997) was an Italian painter and a prominent figure in 20th-century Italian expressionism. Associated with the Corrente movement, he often painted scenes of laborers and rural life in a distinctive expressionist style.

== Biography ==
Migneco was born in Messina. His father was a train station master and his mother was a school teacher. He grew up in the neighbourhood of Ponteschiavo. At the age of 23, he moved to Milan to enroll in the International Medical School, University of Milan, but started gravitating around the local art scene, where he met Renato Birolli, Raffaele De Grada, Beniamino Joppolo and Aligi Sassu. Migneco eventually landed a job as an illustrator for the weekly magazine for children Corriere dei Piccoli. He lost interest in his medical studies, and decided to be a painter.

In 1937, he helped founding the anti-fascist Corrente group, a movement affiliated with the journal Corrente di Vita, and participates in the group's exhibitions. He exhibited his work at Galleria La Spiga in Milan in 1942. The following year, he was conscripted into the fascist army. After the end of World War II, Migneco was able to reprise his artistic career when he had an exhibition at the Galleria Santa Redegonda in Milan in 1945. He was invited to show his work at the Rome Quadriennale in 1948, 1951, 1956, 1959, and last in 1986.

In 1952, his solo exhibition at the 26th Venice Biennale was introduced by Salvatore Quasimodo. In 1954, he exhibited at the Leicester Galleries in London, and at the Venice Biennale again in 1958. In 1983, his work was the subject of a large retrospective at the Palazzo Comunale in his native Messina. Migneco died in Milan in 1997.
