= Villa Della Porta Bozzolo =

Building in Casalzuigno, Italy

Coordinates: 45.9068°N 8.7122°E

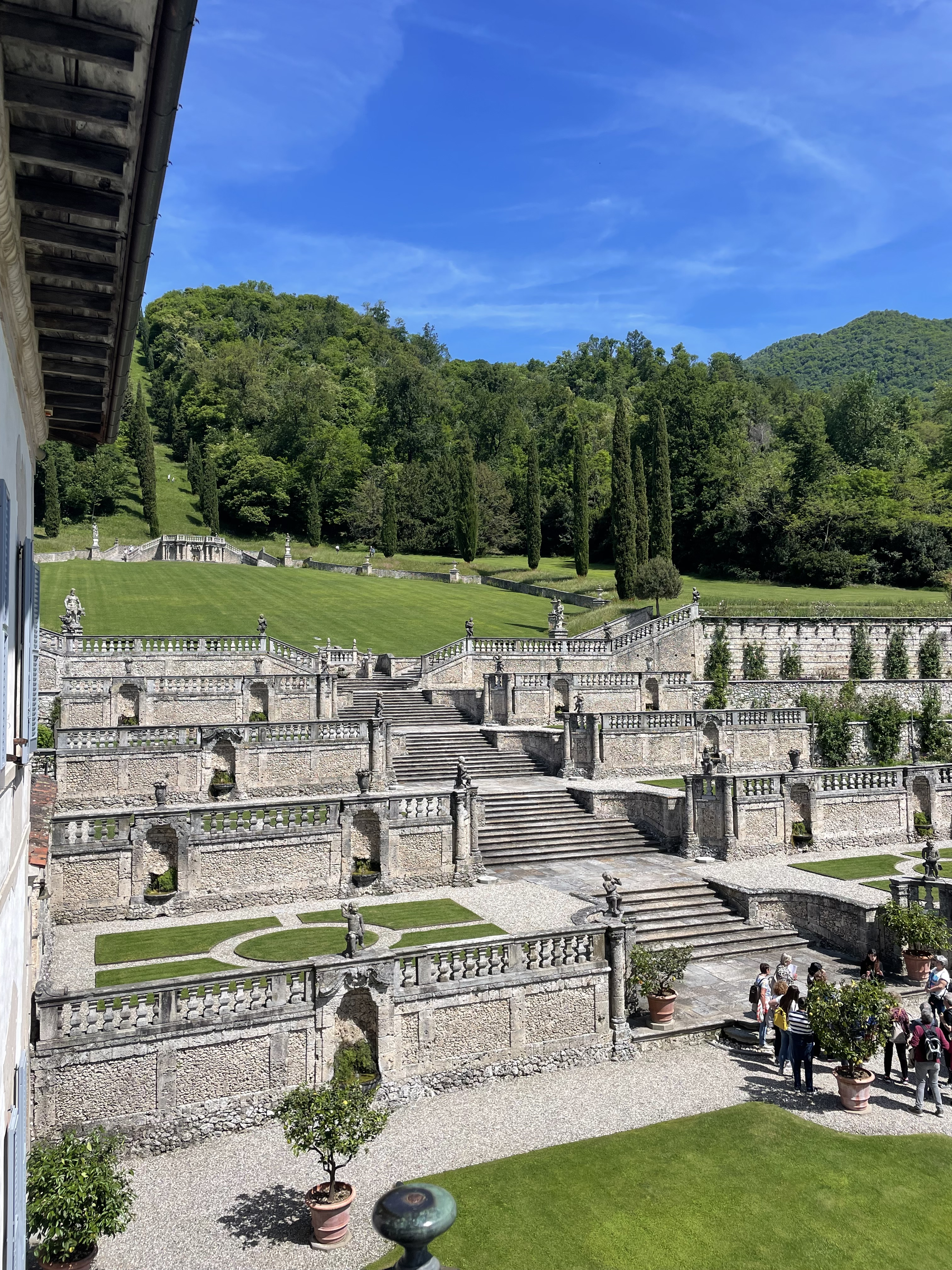
View of the gardens of Villa Della Porta Bozzolo

Villa Della Porta Bozzolo is a villa located at Casalzuigno in the province of Varese, northern Italy. It was donated by the heirs of the Italian senator and pathologist Camillo Bozzolo to the Fondo per l'Ambiente Italiano—the National Trust of Italy—who now manage it.

== History ==
It was built in the 16th century and used as a rural villa and later an aristocratic residence. In the 18th century an impressive Italian garden was added with stairs, fountains, water features and an aedicula decorated with frescoes. Around the villa there are interesting rustic elements, such as a representation of an olive press containing a cycle of rococo frescoes from the workshop of Pietro Antonio Magatti, a painter from Varese.

At the end of the 17th century the villa experienced one of its most important transformations on the initiative of Gian Angelo Della Porta III on the occasion of his marriage to Isabella, daughter of Count Giorgio Giulini. With the assistance of architect Antonio Maria Porani, he set the main axis of the garden parallel to the side of the house—thus contravening the classic rules under which the principal axis must be aligned with the main room of the house, dividing the garden into two symmetrical parts. In 1723, he also built an elaborate fountain cascading from terraces in the hillside, designed by the architect Pellegatta.
