= Casalzuigno =

- Comune
- Comune di Casalzuigno
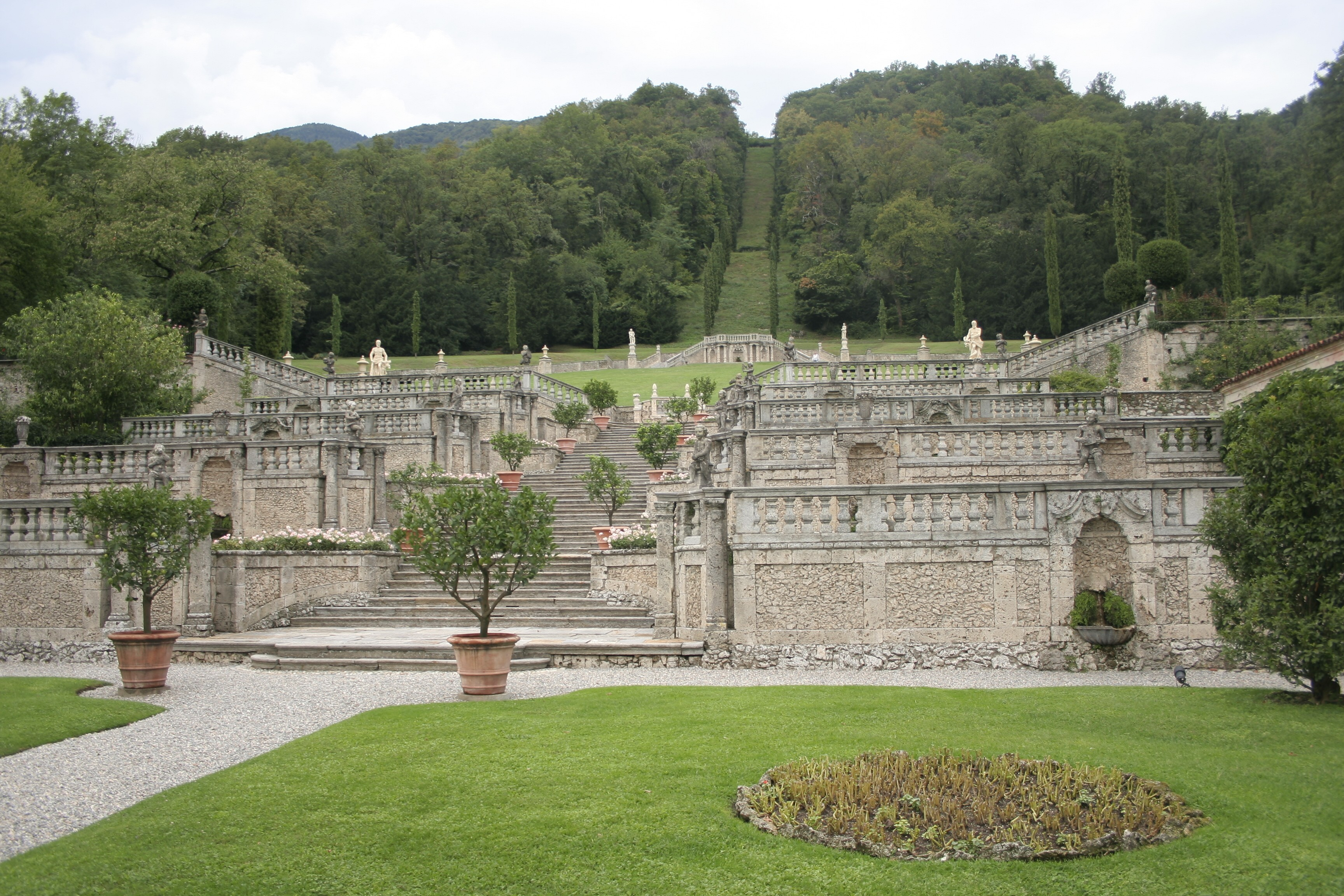
- The gardens of Villa Della Porta Bozzolo

- Coat of arms

- Location within Italy Location within Lombardy
- Coordinates: 45°54′N 8°42′E
- Country: Italy
- Region: Lombardy
- Province: Varese (VA)
- Frazioni: Arcumeggia

Government
  - Mayor: Danilo De Rocchi

Area
  - Total: 7.3 km^{2} (2.8 sq mi)

Population (28 February 2010)
  - Total: 1,377
  - Density: 190/km^{2} (490/sq mi)
- Demonym: Casalzuignesi
- Time zone: UTC+1 (CET)
  - Summer (DST): UTC+2 (CEST)
- Postal code: 21030
- Dialing code: 0332
- Website: www.comune.casalzuigno.va.it

Casalzuigno (Casàl Sciuìgn in lombard) is a comune (municipality) in the Province of Varese in the Italian region Lombardy, located about 60 kilometres (37 mi) northwest of Milan and about 14 kilometres (9 mi) northwest of Varese.

Casalzuigno includes the Villa Della Porta Bozzolo, a 16th-century villa belonging to the Fondo per l'Ambiente Italiano, donated by the heirs of the Italian senator and pathologist Camillo Bozzolo.

Arcumeggia, a frazione of the municipality of Casalzuigno has, on the external walls of the houses, some paintings, performed with the technique of the fresco, by Italian artists of the 20th century.

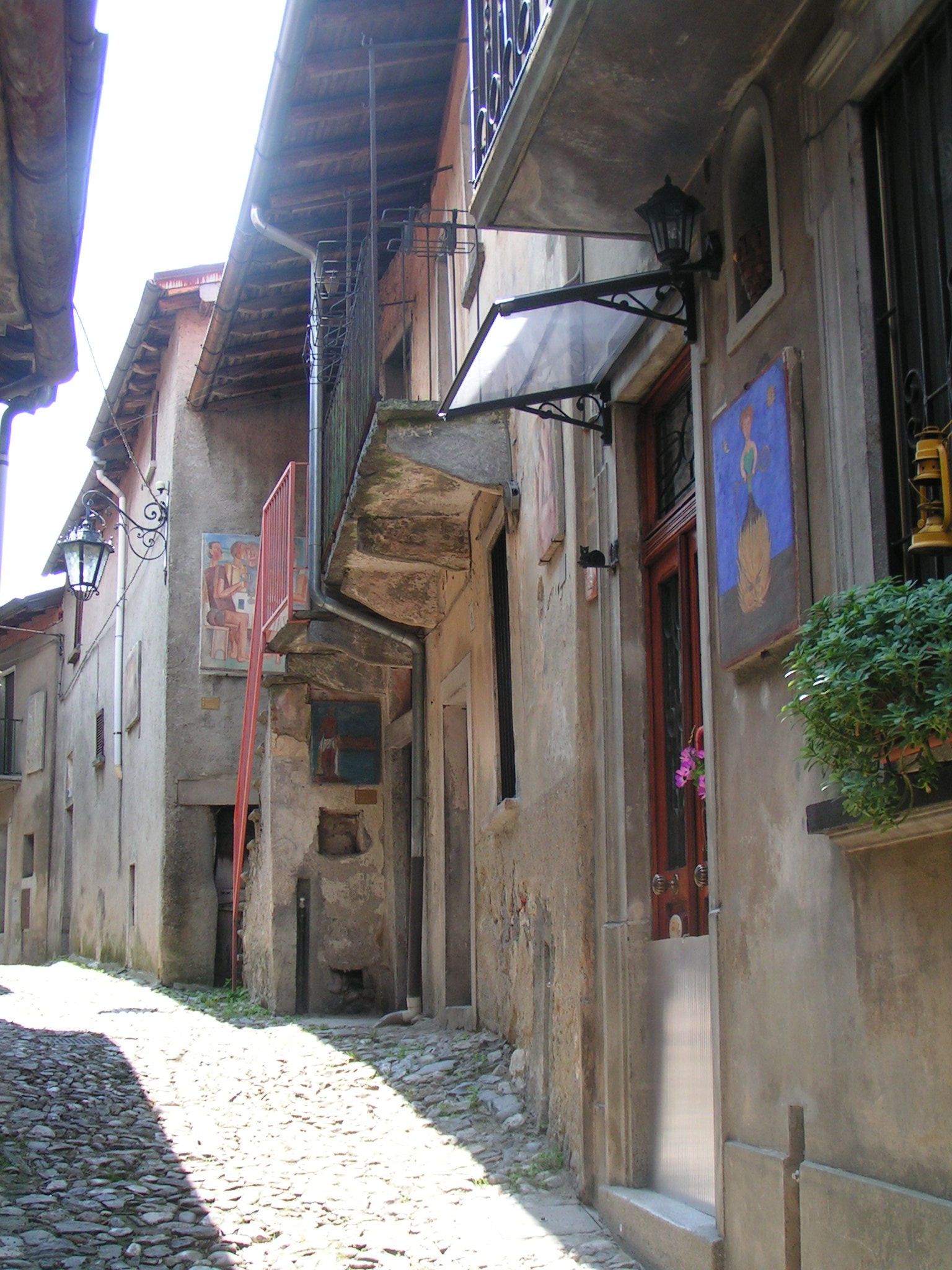
A street of Arcumeggia, said "Students’ street" because there are on show the works of the students of Fine Arts Academies

Casalzuigno borders the following municipalities: Azzio, Brenta, Castelveccana, Cuveglio, Cuvio, Duno, Porto Valtravaglia.

Casalzuigno is located in Valcuvia, a region inhabited since prehistoric times by Ligurians, probably coming from the settlements of Lake Varese. The settlement of the Ligurians in Valcuvia gave rise to the so-called civilization of the Man of Valcuvia confirmed by the discovery of a prehistoric ax in the hamlet of Arcumeggia, part of the current municipality of Casalzuigno.
