= Eusebio Oehl =

Italian histologist and physiologist

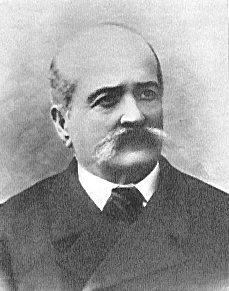
Eusebio Oehl

Eusebio Oehl (5 December 1827 – 10 April 1903) was an Italian histologist and physiologist who was a native of Lodi.

== Biography ==
Oehl studied medicine at the University of Pavia, and following graduation (1850), he continued his education in Vienna under Joseph Hyrtl (1810–1894) and Ernst Wilhelm von Brücke (1819–1892). Afterwards, he returned to Pavia, where he taught classes in histology at the Collegio Ghislieri and at the university. In 1864 he attained the chair of physiology at the institute of physiology in Pavia.

At Pavia, he introduced microscopic studies in the fields of anatomy and histology, being credited with developing systematic studies of cell structure via the microscope. He conducted pioneer physiological studies on salivation, and described "Oehl's muscles", defined as strands of muscle fibers in the chordae tendineae of the left atrioventricular valve. Among his better known students were Camillo Golgi (1843–1926), Camillo Bozzolo (1845–1920), Giulio Bizzozero (1846–1901) and Enrico Sertoli (1842–1910).

== Selected writings ==
- Teoria ed uso del microscopio, Pavia, Tipografia dei Fratelli Fusi, 1855 - Theory and use of the microscope.
- L'Istituto e l'insegnamento straordinario di fisiologia sperimentale in Pavia, Pavia, Bizzoni, 1862. - The Institute and the instruction of physiological experiences in Pavia.
- Fisiologia del pneumogastrico (1867) - Physiology of the pneumogastric.
- Manuale di Fisiologia (published in 3 volumes), Milano, 1868-1876 - Manual of physiology.
