= Enrico Sertoli =

Italian physiologist (1842–1910)

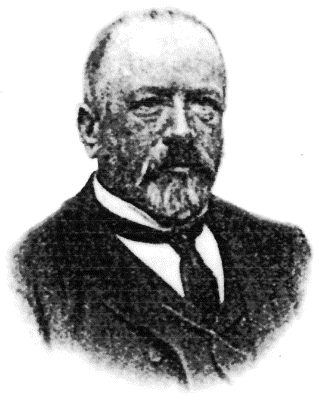
- Born: June 6, 1842
- Died: January 28, 1910 (aged 67)
- Education: University of Pavia

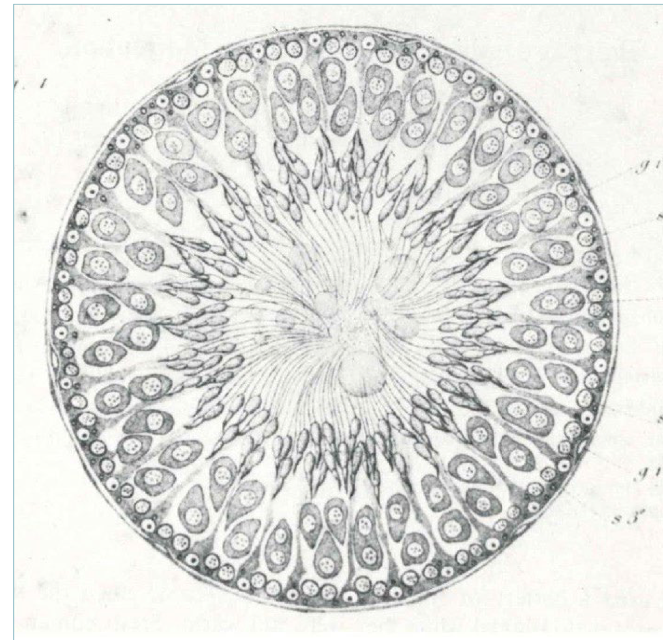
Sertoli's idealised drawing illustrating a cross section of a seminiferous tubule. (1878)

Enrico Sertoli (June 6, 1842, Sondrio – January 28, 1910, Sondrio) was an Italian physiologist, histologist, anatomist, biological chemist, physician, teacher, and inventor. He is remembered for his discovery regarding the branched cells of seminiferous tubules.

== Biography ==
=== Birth, youth and university study ===
On June 6, 1842, Enrico Sertoli was born into a noble family living in Sondrio, a pleasant, northern Italian town located in the Orobic Alps. His father was Giuseppe Sertoli, the architectural engineer who designed and supervised the renovation of Sts. Gervaso and Protasio Church. Enrico spent his childhood and adolescence in Sondrio, the second of five brothers. He received a classical undergraduate education in Sondrio. When he was 18 years old, he matriculated in the Department of Medicine and Surgery of the University of Pavia, where he became a resident student under the supervision of the physiologist and histologist Eusebio Oehl, an early proponent of the experimental method, noted for his studies of dermal structure. From Oehl, Sertoli acquired knowledge of biologic and microscopic techniques, working alongside such individuals as Giulio Bizzozzero, the discoverer of platelets, and Camillo Golgi, a future Nobel Prize winner.

=== Main discovery ===
Sertoli graduated from the University of Pavia Medical School in 1865 when he was 23 years old. That same year, his most important paper reported his histologic discoveries regarding the seminiferous tubules. The paper was titled, "Dell'esistenza di particolari cellule ramificate nei canalicoli seminiferi del testicolo umano" (About the existence of special, branched cells in the seminiferous tubules of the human testis).

Using the microscope and unique, cellular dyeing techniques, he demonstrated previously unseen, branching, tree-like cells with the bases of their "trunks" abutting the inner wall of the seminiferous tubules. Their nuclei were pale staining, oval to pyramidal shaped, and contained one or two prominent nucleoli. The branching parts of the newly discovered, tree-like cells were cytoplasmic structures. Sertoli named the cells he had discovered "cellule ramificate" (branched cells).

He explained that he only described the morphologic characteristics of the branched cells, because he did not understand their nature and function. Later, however, after having subsequently examined the testes of horses, bears, sheep, goats, rabbits, and mice. Using penile retractor muscles of various domestic animals, smooth muscles that have regular and parallel fibers, he produced the first myogram. He was the first to demonstrate objectively the duration of the excitability and heat sensibility of the tested muscular fibers.

He also described a case of pseudo hermaphroditism in a sterile goat: the goat's testes had "branched cells" but lacked germinal cells.

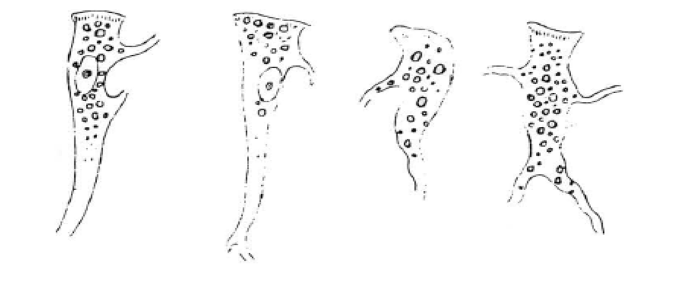
Drawing of Sertoli cells. (From Sertoli E. Il Morgagni 1865)

Sertoli concluded that the branched cells functioned to support and nourish the developing germ cells and to phagocytose damaged cells. The cells were then named "Sertoli's cells" in honour of the Italian student who first described them.

=== Research in Vienna ===
After graduating from medical school, Sertoli was awarded a grant to conduct research at the University of Vienna (Austria) in the laboratory of Professor E.W. Brucke, one of the most famous biologists of the time. War between Austria and Italy ended his research time in Vienna 1 year later.

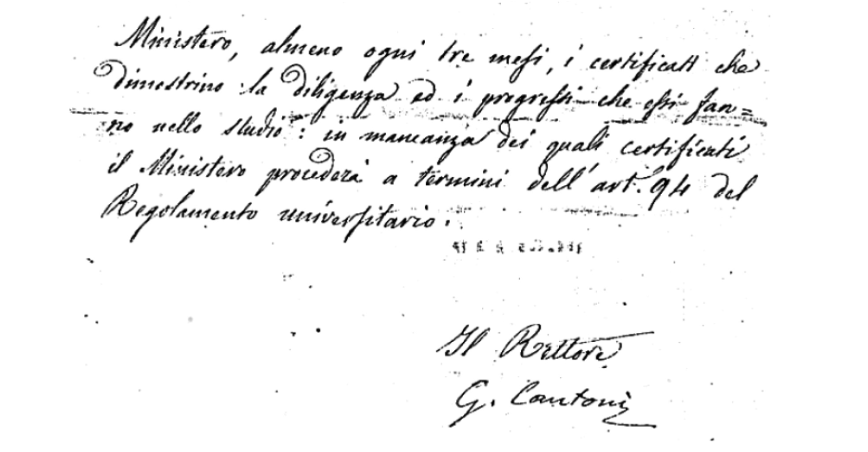
Excerpt from a letter written by the Rector G. Cantoni announcing the achievement of a scholarship for Vienna.

Excerpt from a letter written by the Rector G. Cantoni, dated 18 October 1865: "In seguito al felice esito da lei sortito negli esami (...) per un posto di studio all'estero, il Regio Ministero dell'Istruzione pubblica (...) le ha aggiudicato un sussidio di lire 2400 per un anno, affinchè ella possa perfezionarsi in Vienna nella scienza della Fisiologia e Istologia. (...) I sussidi saranno pagati in dodici rate mensili eguali posticipate".

However Enrico probably received only a part of the 2400 lire bursary he had been awarded because he hastily returned to Italy the next year.

=== Military service ===
He returned to Italy for military service and was placed under the command of Colonel Guicciardi; he fought to resist Austria's efforts to invade northern Italy through the Stelvio Pass. When an armistice was called, he received a short military leave in Sondrio before being sent with the 68th Regiment of the Infantry to mitigate a rebellion in Palermo, Sicily. An epidemic there had him fighting cholera instead of rebels.

After leaving the military in 1867, Sertoli obtained an appointment as an assistant in the Laboratory of Physiology in Tübingen, Germany, where he studied the functions of blood proteins and the pulmonary elimination of carbonic acid.

=== Teaching career ===
Sertoli was appointed Professor of Physiology in the Department of Anatomy and Physiology of the Secondary School of Veterinary Medicine in Milan at age 28.

His lecture at the opening ceremony of the academic year in 1872 at the Royal School of Veterinary Medicine in Milan stated that life includes the concept of form because life is not comprehensible without organs and organisms; and, knowledge of form is important because it graphically represents the laws according to which the processes of life take place. Form influences the manifestation of the vital properties of organized life substances. Knowledge of form must be extended to its extreme if (one) wants to reap the greatest possible benefits.

Enrico Sertoli concluded his talk by exhorting his listeners to study histology. In somewhat bombastic tones, typical of the rhetoric of his time, he said: "Take courage, young scholars! Don't be deterred by the difficulties you will encounter in studying such an important part of medical knowledge".

=== Retirement and death ===
After 37 years of scientific study and didactic activity in Milan he ended his career and retired in Sondrio in 1907. He was not married, and he had no children. He died on January 28, 1910. Although Enrico Sertoli did not have the technology to discover the function of his "cellule ramificate," given the right tools, he would likely have described their physiologic purpose.

Thinking of how a remarkable intuition can fade into oblivion brings to mind sadder cases, such as Ignaz Semmelweis: the forerunner of antisepsis, who was rejected and forgotten by the scientific community of his time. His ideas only gained traction after his death.

== Contributions ==
=== Sertoli's cells ===
Sertoli is remembered for his 1865 discovery of the eponymous Sertoli cell. These cells line the tubuli seminiferi contorti of the testis, and provide nourishment and support for developing sperm. During the earliest stages of sperm development in the spermatic tubules, the germinal cells are called spermatogonia and they are located near the base of the "trunck" of Sertoli's tree-like cells. As the germinal cell's differentiate, they are moved away from the base and into the branches of the "trees" and by doing so they become spermatids and ultimately spermatozoa.

== Writings ==
- "Dell'esistenza di particolari cellule ramificate nei canalicoli seminiferi del testicolo umano," Il Morgagni, 7: 31–40, 1865
- "Di uno pseudo-ermafroditismo di una capra," Arch Medicina Veterinaria, 1: 22–31, 1876
- Discorso inaugurale di apertura dell'anno scolastico 1872–73 della R. Scuola Superiore di Veterinaria di Milano. Archivio della Regia Scuola Superiore di Veterinaria di Milano, 1872
- "Osservazioni sulla struttura dei canalicoli seiminiferi del testicolo," Gazzetta medica lombarda, Milan, 413–415, 1871
- "Sulla struttura dei canalicoli seiminiferi del testicolo studiata in rapporto allo sviluppo dei nemaspermi," Gazzetta medica lombarda, Milan, 401–403, 1875
- "Über die Bindung der Kohlensaure im Blute und ihre Ausscheidung in der Lunge." Medizinisch-chemische Untersuchungen 2: 350–353, 1867.
