= Timeline of peptic ulcer disease and Helicobacter pylori =

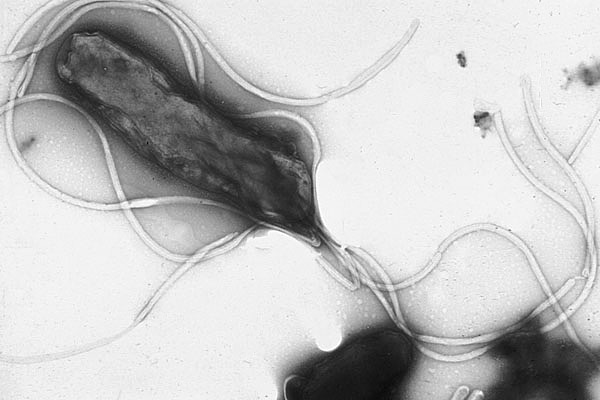
Electron micrograph of H. pylori

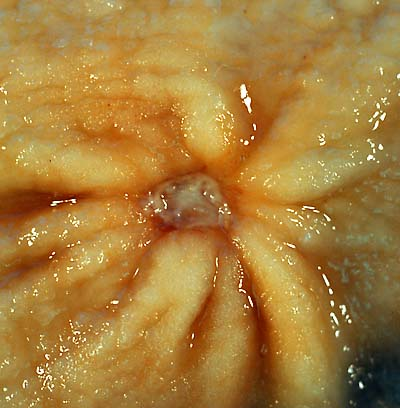
Gastric ulcer

This is a timeline of the events relating to the discovery that peptic ulcer disease and some cancers are caused by H. pylori. In 2005, Barry Marshall and Robin Warren were awarded the Nobel Prize in Physiology or Medicine for their discovery that peptic ulcer disease (PUD) was primarily caused by Helicobacter pylori, a bacterium with affinity for acidic environments, such as the stomach. As a result, PUD that is associated with H. pylori is currently treated with antibiotics used to eradicate the infection. For decades prior to their discovery, it was widely believed that PUD was caused by excess acid in the stomach. During this time, acid control was the primary method of treatment for PUD, to only partial success. Among other effects, it is now known that acid suppression alters the stomach milieu to make it less amenable to H. pylori infection.

== Background ==
Before the 1950s, there were many microbiological descriptions of bacteria in the stomach and in gastric acid secretions, lending credence to both the infective theory and the hyperacidity theory as being causes of peptic ulcer disease. A single study, conducted in 1954, did not find evidence of bacteria on biopsies of the stomach stained traditionally; this effectively established the acid theory as dogma. This paradigm was altered when Warren and Marshall effectively proved Koch's postulates for causation of PUD by H. pylori through a series of experiments in the 1980s; however, an extensive effort was required to convince the medical community of the relevance of their work. Now, all major gastrointestinal societies agree that H. pylori is the primary nondrug cause of PUD worldwide, and advocate its eradication as essential to treatment of gastric and duodenal ulcers. Additionally, H. pylori has been associated with lymphomas and adenocarcinomas of the stomach, and has been classified by the World Health Organization as a carcinogen. Advances in molecular biology in the late 20th century led to the sequencing of the H. pylori genome, resulting in a better understanding of virulence factors responsible for its colonization and infection, on the DNA level.

== Pre-20th century ==
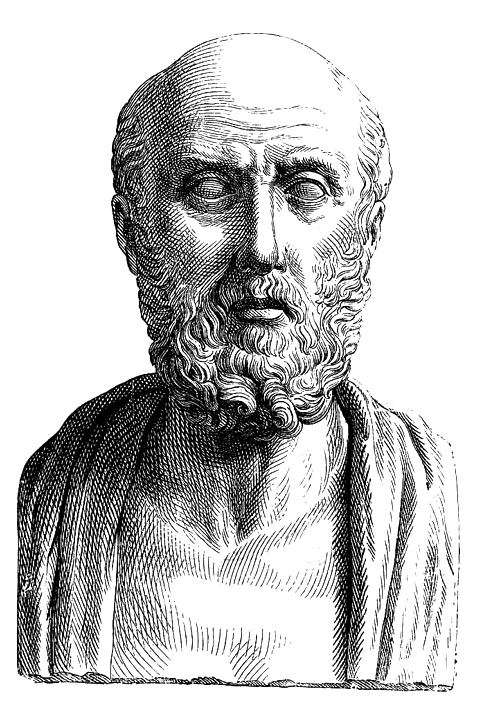
Hippocrates

Pre 16th century
Hippocrates first describes gastric symptoms.
Avicenna notes the relationship between gastric pain and mealtimes.

1586
Marcellus Donatus of Mantua performs autopsies and describes gastric ulcers.

1688
Johannes von Murault observes duodenal ulcers.

1728
Stahl hypothesizes that some fevers are related to gastric inflammation and ulceration.

1761
Pain is associated with stomach ulcers.

1799
Matthew Baillie publishes a description of ulcers.

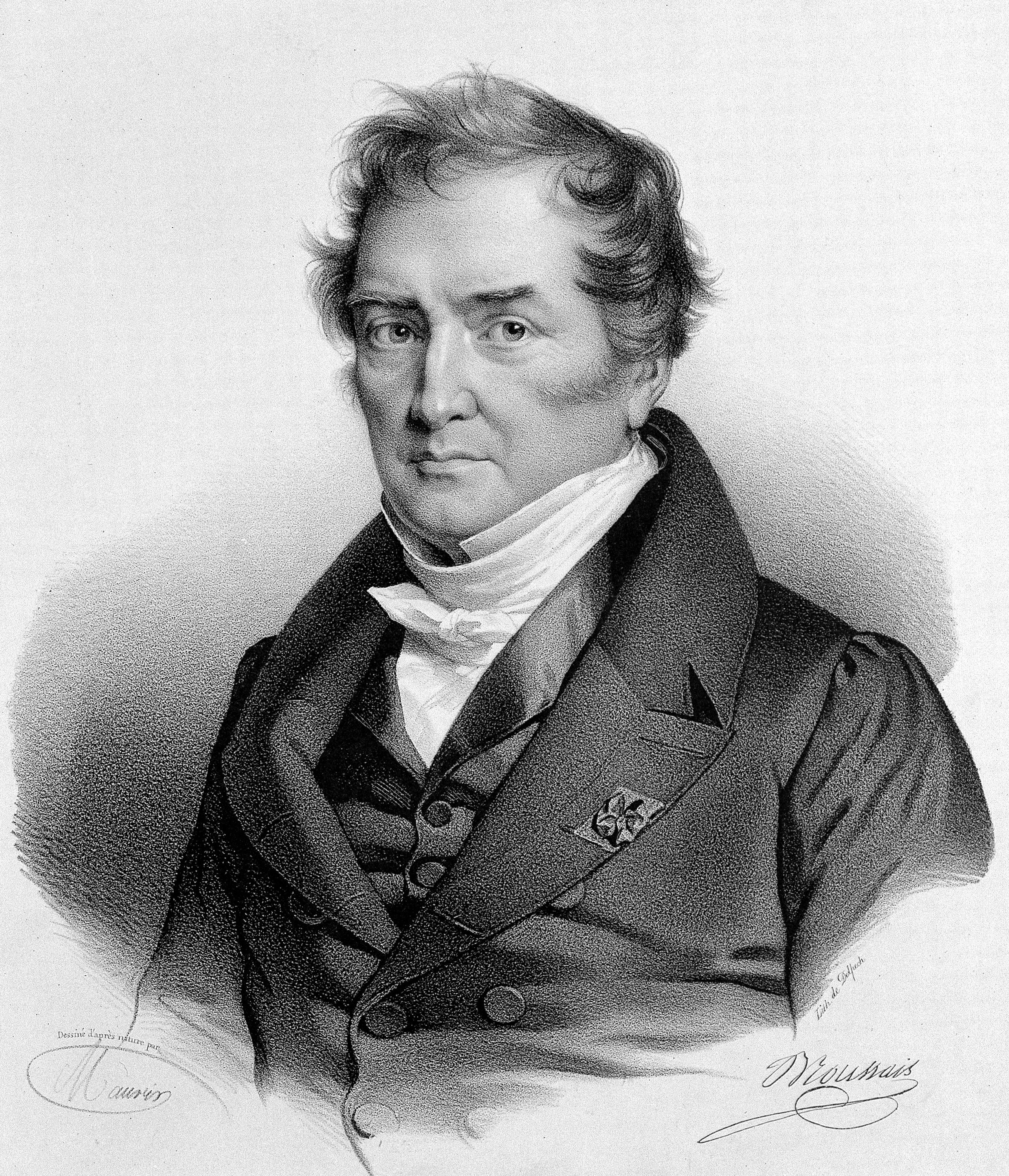
François-Joseph-Victor Broussais

1812
Broussais discovers that if acute gastritis is untreated, it can become chronic.

1821
Nepveu argues for a relationship between gastritis and gastric cancer.

1822
William Beaumont first demonstrates the acidity of the stomach and a relationship between acid levels and mood.

1868
Kussmaul suggests using bismuth compounds, an antibacterial agent, to treat peptic ulcers (bismuth subsalicylate has since been used in many commercial drugs, including Pepto Bismol as part of antibacterial H. pylori treatment). The antibacterial properties of bismuth were not known until much later.

1875
G. Bottcher and M. Letulle hypothesize that ulcers are caused by bacteria.

1880
J. Cohnheim suggests that ulcers may be caused by chemical factors.

1881
Klebs notes the presence of bacteria-like organisms in the lumen of the gastric glands.

1889
Walery Jaworski describes spiral organisms in sediment washings of humans. He suggests these organisms might be involved with gastric disease.

1892
Giulio Bizzozero observes spiral organisms in the stomach of dogs.

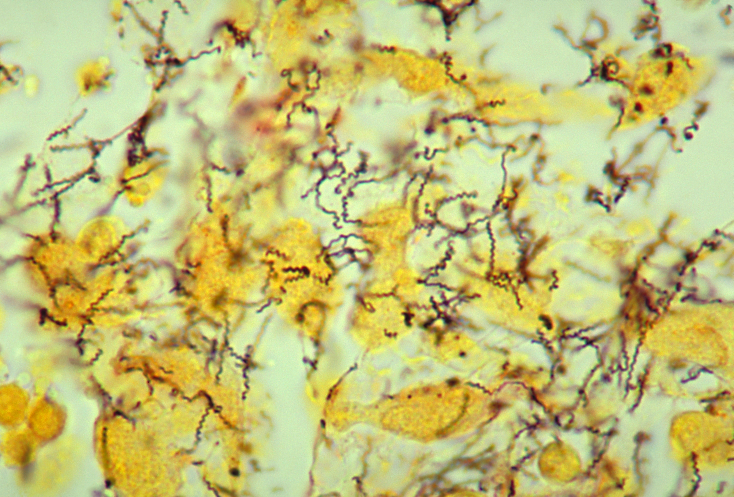
Spirochete bacteria

1896
Saloon finds spirochetes in the stomachs of cats and mice.

1899
Pieter Klazes Pel describes spiral shaped bacteria he found in the stomachs of humans.

== 1900–1950 ==
1905
F. Reigel suggests that ulcers are caused by excess acid.

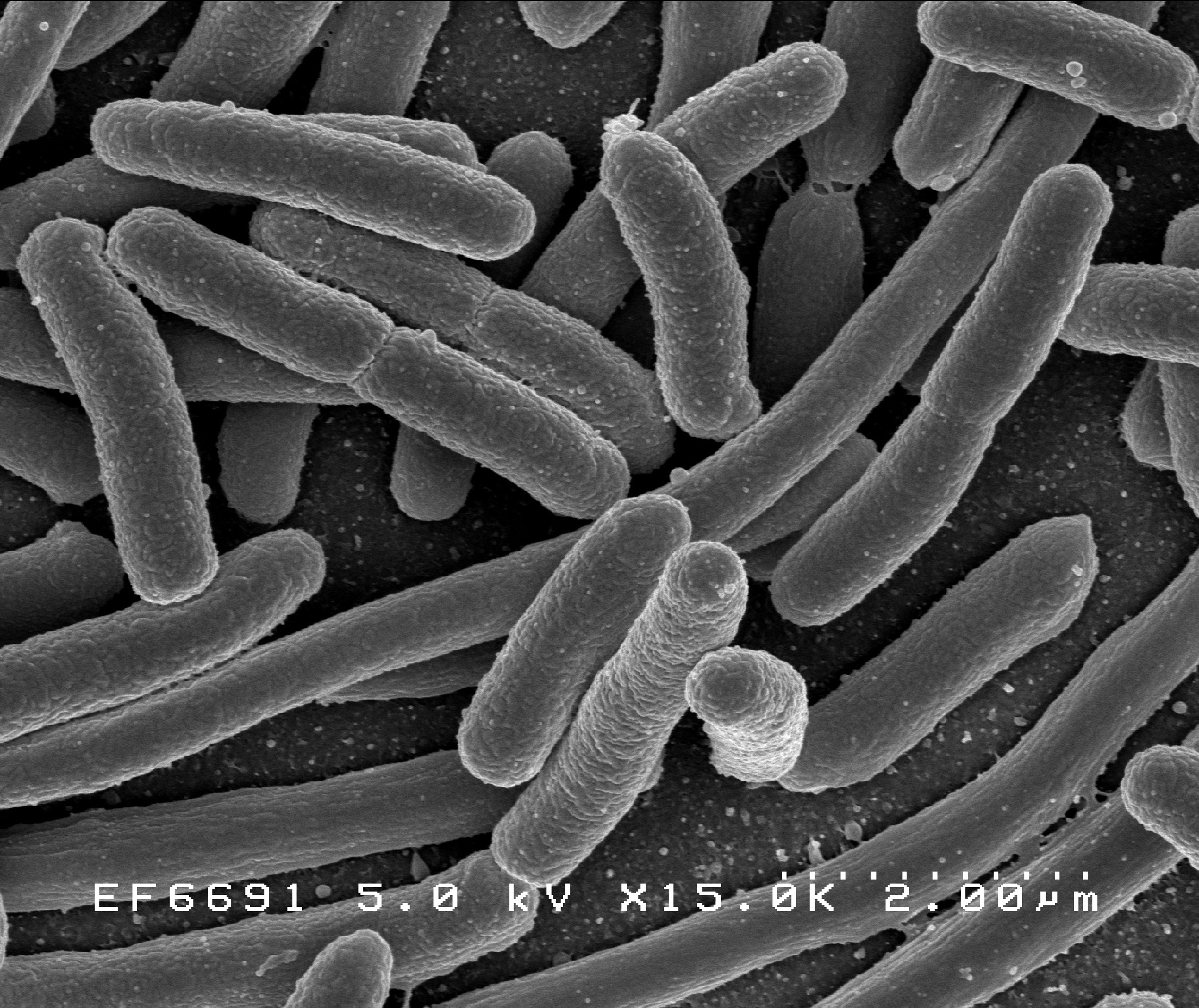
Bacillus coli (E. coli)

1906
Krienitz finds bacteria in the stomach of people with gastric cancer.
Turck feeds dogs Bacillus coli and produces ulcers.

1907
Berkley Moynihan suggests that acid is a cause of ulcers.

1910
Schwartz publishes the excess acid theory of the ulcer, coining the famous phrase "no acid, no ulcer."
Gibelli claims to be unable to reproduce Turck's study where he artificially created ulcers by feeding dogs bacteria.

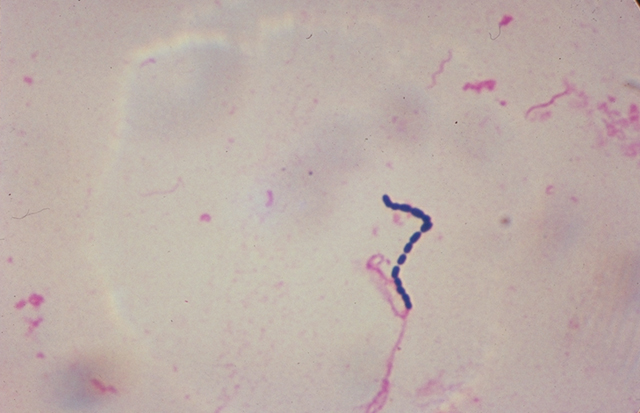
Streptococci

1913
Rosenow suggests that streptococci produce ulcers.

1915
Antacids are first recommended for the treatment of PUD.
Bacteria are associated with PUD, but it is assumed that the bacteria reside in the mouth.

1919
Katsuya Kasai and Rokuzo Kobayashi isolate spirochetes in cats and transmit them to rabbits, producing ulcers.

1921
Luger discovers spirochetes in the gastric juice, and associates their presence with gastric cancer.

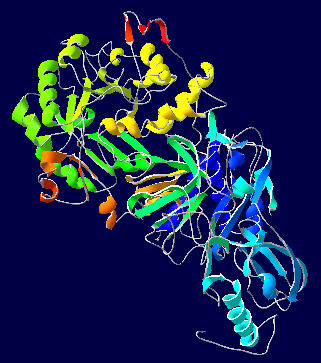
Urease

1924
Luck and Seth discover urease in the human stomach, which they believe is naturally occurring.

1925
Hoffman injects a small sample from a human with PUD into a guinea pig, producing ulcers, and isolates a bacterium which he believes caused the ulcers.

1936
First edition of the Russian Large Medical Encyclopedia suggests infection is one of the causes of PUD.

1939
A. Stone Freedberg begins a study to look for bacteria in the human stomach at Beth Israel Hospital. He finds H. pylori. It is rumored that others cannot reproduce the results, although no negative results are published.
James Doenges describes spirochetes in autopsies.

1940
Freedberg and Baron observe spirochetes in autopsies. Freedberg abandons his research, however, after his boss advises him to move to another subject. In 2005, Marshall speculates that Freedberg would have won the Nobel Prize in 1951 had he continued his work.

1948
Fitzgerald and Murphy hypothesize that PUD is caused by acid eating away mucosa, and demonstrate the effectiveness of urea as a treatment for PUD.

== 1950–1970 ==
1951
J. Allende publishes a book describing the treatment of gastric ulcers with penicillin.

1953
Dintzis and Hastings are able to stop urease production in mice with antibiotics, suggesting a relationship between urease and a bacterial infection.

1954
Palmer publishes a study which finds no bacteria in the human stomach. He concludes earlier discoveries were a result of contamination. He chooses not to use a silver staining method, which will be later used to reveal H. pylori by Warren and Marshall.

1955
Tarnopolskaya observes that penicillin seems to cure some peptic ulcers.
Moutier and Cornet suggest treating gastritis with antibiotics.
Kornberg and Davies observe that antibiotics reduce urease in cats.

Ammonia

1957
Charles Lieber and Andre Lefèvre discover that antibiotics reduce gastric urea to ammonia conversion.

1958
Gordon observes that penicillin cures some peptic ulcers.
John Lykoudis successfully treats his own gastroenteritis with antibiotics.
Lieber and Lefèvre present their results at the World Congress of Gastroenterology in Washington. It is not well received because of the widespread belief that bacteria cannot survive in the human stomach, due to Palmer.

1959
Lieber and Lefèvre publish a follow-up study demonstrating that antibiotics prevent the conversion of urea to ammonia in the human stomach.
Conway et al. call into question the extent of urease produced by bacteria in mice, as an argument against the bacterial theory of PUD.

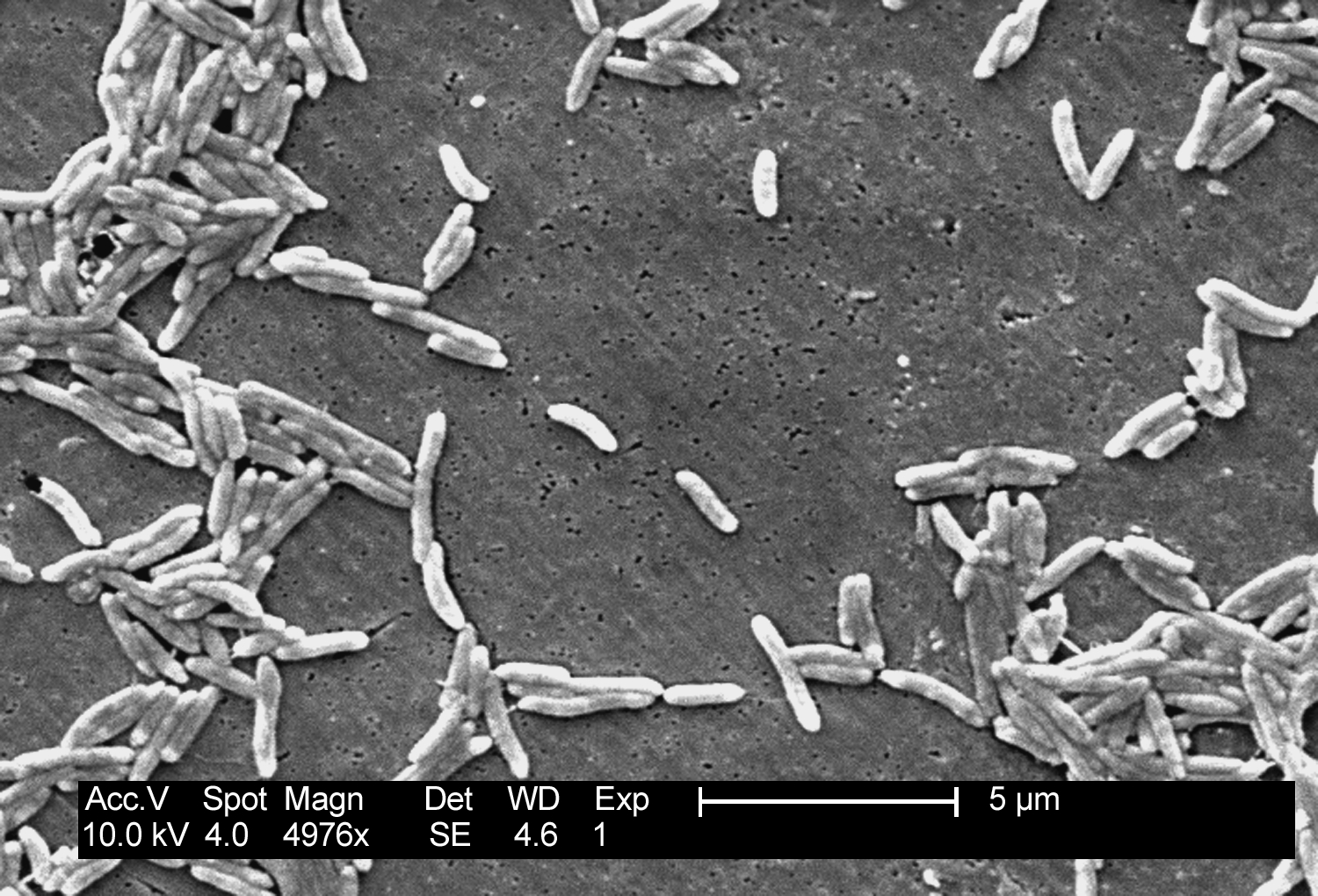
Campylobacter fetus

1960
Vital and Orrego observe Campylobacter-like organisms in the stomachs of cats and dogs.
Lykoudis is awarded a Greek patent (#22,453) for his antibiotic treatment of PUD.

1962
Susser and Stein publish a paper identifying a cohort phenomenon of PUD in England. This is taken as evidence for stress causing PUD.

1964
Lykoudis presents his antibiotic treatment for PUD at a meeting of the Medico-Surgical Society in Greece. He is largely shunned by the medical establishment.

1966
Lykoudis' manuscript is rejected by The Journal of the American Medical Association.

1967
Susumu Ito describes Campylobacter-like organisms attached to a gastric epithelial cell.

1968
Lykoudis is fined 4,000 drachmas for treating PUD patients with his treatment, which includes antibiotics.

== 1970–21st century ==
1971
Howard Steer observes H. pylori from biopsies of a patient with ulcers.

1972
The first report of successfully using furazolidone (an antibacterial agent) to treat PUD in China.

1974
Morozov observes H. pylori; he does not connect this discovery to PUD.
A well regarded study of PUD is published which does not mention bacteria.

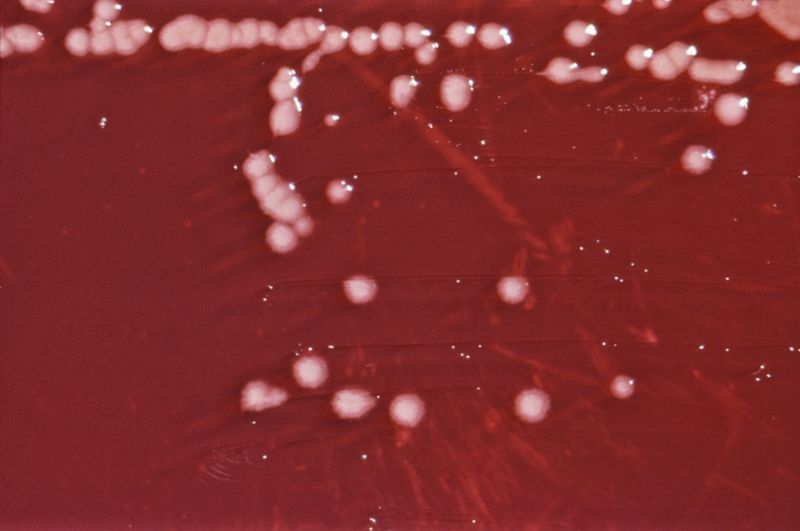
Pseudomonas aeruginosa

1975
Steer and Colin-Jones publish their results regarding H. pylori and its relation to PUD. They decide that it was Pseudomonas, a contaminant, and not related to PUD.

1978
At a meeting of the American Gastroenterology Association in Las Vegas, several papers are presented which suggest that acid control via H_{2} blockers is ineffective at curing PUD.

1979
Ramsey publishes a study demonstrating that bismuth can help eradicate PUD. Bismuth is an antibacterial agent, although this is not recognized by Ramsey.
J. Robin Warren first observes H. pylori in a gastric biopsy.
Fung, Papadimitriou, and Matz observe H. pylori.

1981
Yao Shi observes bacteria in the stomach, but he believes they are passing through the stomach and not colonizing it.
July: Barry Marshall joins gastroenterology division of Royal Perth Hospital and meets Robin Warren
October: Marshall and Warren successfully treat their first PUD patient with antibiotics.

1982
Satoha et al. find evidence for an infectious cause of ulcers in rats.
Marshall and Warren begin their first study to determine the relationship between H. pylori and PUD.
First successful culturing of H. pylori performed; it occurs almost by accident.
October: Marshall discovers the bacteria he is investigating are not campylobacteria, by looking at electron micrographs.
October 2: Marshall presents his and Warren's results at a local College of Physicians meeting. He meets with criticism, which Marshall later admits was well-founded (at least in part).

Cimetidine

1983
January: Two letters authored by Warren and Marshall, respectively, are sent to The Lancet describing their results.
February: Gastroenterological Society of Australia rejects Marshall's abstract to present his research at their yearly conference. They deem it in the bottom 10% of papers submitted. The same abstract is accepted for presentation at a Campylobacter workshop in Brussels.
April: Marshall and Ian Hislop begin a study to compare bismuth treatment with cimetidine. The study is abandoned because it is inconclusive.
June: Warren and Marshall's letter appears in The Lancet.
September: H. pylori is observed in patients outside of Australia.
After the appearance of the letters in The Lancet, groups around the world begin isolating H. pylori.

1984
A paper describing Marshall and Warren's results is accepted by the Gastroenterological Society of Australia for presentation.
Marshall and Goodwin attempt to infect pigs with H. pylori in an attempt to demonstrate that it causes PUD. The experiment fails.
Marshall and Warren's paper is accepted by The Lancet in May and published in June. Many reviewers dislike the paper.
McNulty and Watson are able to reproduce Marshall and Warren's results.
June 12: Marshall intentionally consumes H. pylori and becomes ill. He takes antibiotics and is relieved of his symptoms.
The National Health and Medical Research Council of Australia fully funds Marshall's research into H. pylori.
A study is published in China about the effectiveness of treating PUD with an antibacterial agent.
July 31: The New York Times publishes an article by its medical correspondent Dr. Lawrence K. Altman on the possible link between H. pylori and PUD. He states in 2002, "I’ve never seen the medical community more defensive or more critical of a story" since he joined the newspaper in 1969.
Thomas Borody developed the bismuth-based "Triple Therapy" consisting of bismuth and two antibiotics. This became the first truly successful treatment for H. pylori with an eradication rate greater than 90%.

1985
Marshall publishes the results of self-induced infection.

1987
Drumm and colleagues following a study of children reported in The New England Journal of Medicine that Helicobacter pylori was specifically associated with primary or unexplained gastric inflammation and primary duodenal ulceration, whereas the bacteria were not found in association with secondary gastric inflammation and ulcers due to causes such as Crohn's disease or critical illness. Because gastritis and duodenal ulceration are rare in children, this study had the capacity to demonstrate that Warren and Marshall were correct in claiming that H. pylori was a specific pathogen rather than, as had been suggested by some, merely an opportunistic colonizer of an inflamed or ulcerated mucosal surface. This was the first time that The New England Journal of Medicine, the world's leading medical journal, published a study on Helicobacter pylori.
Morris intentionally consumes H. pylori. Like Marshall, he becomes ill, but unlike Marshall, he is not completely cured by antibiotics. The infection will remain with him for three years.
An extensive study in Dublin demonstrates that eradicating H. pylori substantially reduces recurrence of ulcers.

1990
Borody's triple therapy became commercialized in the United States under the product name Helidac.
Rauws and Tytgat describe cure of duodenal ulcer by eradication of H. pylori using Borody's triple therapy combination. Triple-therapy, modernized to a proton pump inhibitor and two antibiotics, soon becomes first line therapy for eradication.
World Congress of Gastroenterology recommends eradicating H. pylori to cure duodenal ulcers.
First report of resistance of H. pylori to the antibiotic metronidazole. Resistance of H. pylori to treatment will lead to the development of many different antibiotic and proton pump inhibitor regimens for eradication.

1992
Fukuda et al. prove ingestion of H. pylori causes gastritis in rhesus monkeys.
Covacci et al. sequence the CagA gene, which encodes for a cytotoxin-associated surface protein, which correlated strongly with strains of H. pylori that caused duodenal ulcers. This was the first description of a virulence factor for H. pylori infection determined by molecular techniques.

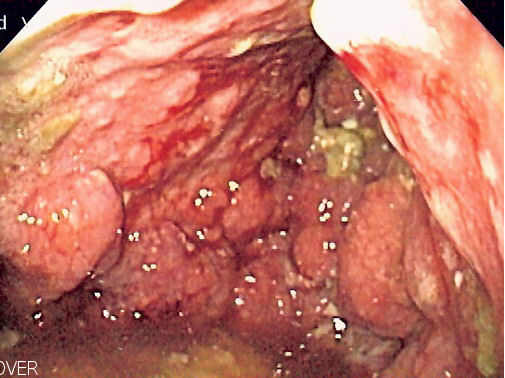
Gastric cancer

1994
Fujioka et al. prove similar results as those from Fukuda et al.
Patents for acid reducing drugs expire, removing financial incentive to resist antibiotics as treatment of PUD.
A conference held by National Institute of Health (USA) demonstrates the general acceptance of H. pylori as cause of PUD in the US.
The World Health Organization's International Agency for Research on Cancer declares H. pylori a Group 1 carcinogen.
Parsonnet et al. describe an association between H. pylori and lymphomas of the gastrointestinal tract. These malignant ulcers can also be treated by eradicating Helicobacter.

1997
Tomb et al. complete sequencing of the entire 1,667,867 base pairs of the H. pylori genome. This assists in identifying new virulence factors for the infectivity of H. pylori on the molecular level.

2001
Chan et al. show in a randomized control trial that eradication of H. pylori even prevents bleeding from ulcers that is caused by aspirin and non-steroidal anti-inflammatory drugs.

2002
The European Helicobacter Pylori Study Group published the Maastricht 2-2000 Consensus Report, suggesting a "test-and-treat" strategy for H. pylori in young patients without atypical symptoms. This strategy advocates the use of noninvasive testing to evaluate for H. pylori and simply treating if found, even in the absence of ulcer disease documented on endoscopy.

2005
Warren and Marshall are awarded the Nobel Prize in Physiology or Medicine for their work on H. pylori and PUD.
