= Marcellus Donato =

Marcellus Donati
- Born: 1538; Mantua, Italy
- Died: June 8, 1602 (aged 63–64)
- Other names: Marcellus Donatus, Marcello Donati, Marcello Donato, Marcellus Donato
- Education: University of Padua
- Scientific career
- Academic advisors: Francesco Facini

Marcellus Donatus (Latin: Marcellus Donatus; Italian: Marcello Donati; 1538 – 8 June 1602) was an Italian physician, medical scholar, philosopher, and humanist from Mantua. He served as court physician and advisor to the Gonzaga dukes of Mantua and Montferrat. He is best known for his 1586 work De medica historia mirabili libri sex, which includes one of the earliest detailed post-mortem descriptions of gastric (peptic) ulcers.

== Early life and education ==
Little is documented about Donatus's early life. Born in 1538, in or near Mantua, he received a humanist education typical of the Renaissance period, emphasizing classical languages, philosophy, and medicine. He trained as a physician, likely influenced by the medical traditions of northern Italian universities such as Padua. Donato entered Accademia degli Invaghiti in 1567 and served as rector in 1576 and 1599.

Donato married Cecilia Laziosi. He was the tutor for Vincenzo I Gonzaga and in 1587 was granted a fiefdom in the Montferrato and earned the title Count. Donato then became consigliere di stato and was given Knighthood of Santo Stefano by the grand duke of Tuscany.

== Career ==
Donatus practiced medicine in Mantua and rose to prominence as a court physician (a secretis & consiliario) to the Gonzaga family, one of the leading princely houses of the Italian Renaissance. His role involved both clinical practice and advisory duties at court. He was active during a period when dissection and autopsy were gaining acceptance among physicians, despite lingering cultural and religious reservations.

He contributed to the intellectual life of Mantua and was connected to scholarly circles that included Jesuit influences in the development of the local university. Donatus blended humanist scholarship—reviving and commenting on ancient medical texts—with empirical observation.

Donatus's major publication is: De medica historia mirabili libri sex (Mantua: Francesco Osana, 1586; later editions followed). This six-book collection of medical observations, case studies, and "wonderful" or rare phenomena drew on classical, medieval, and contemporary sources. It covered a wide range of topics, including pathology, obstetrics, gynecology, and unusual clinical cases. The work was valued for its learning and observational approach.

Other attributed or related works include treatises on smallpox (De variolis et morbillis) and various medical consilia.

In 1582, Donato was a witness to the murder of James Crichton.

=== Contribution to pathology ===
In De medica historia mirabili, Donatus described autopsies he performed, including a notable case of a man who died after symptoms suggestive of gastric disease. His account provided one of the clearest early descriptions of gastric ulcers visible at post-mortem examination, linking clinical symptoms (such as pain related to meals) to pathological findings in the stomach wall. This advanced the recognition of peptic ulcer disease beyond earlier symptomatic descriptions by Hippocrates and Avicenna.

He also documented cases in obstetrics/gynecology, poisoning, and epidemic diseases like smallpox (notably the 1567 outbreak). Donato recorded one of the first medical autopsies of carbon monoxide poisoning after examination of prisoners who had died from inhalation of coal fumes and observed a bright red skin complexion indicative of elevated carboxyhemoglobin levels. Donato also recorded a case of albumen allergy in 1588. Donato also claimed Gentile da Foligno was the first to describe gallstones. Miscellaneous reports from Donato include: caesarean section in 1540, extraction of a cherry pit after sprouting from a child's ear, and removal of a leech from a patients nasal cavity. Other reports included: lactation in a man, pregnancy due to hydrometra, paralysis due to division of nerves of motion, and an early pathological and anatomical description of cancer. He is also credited with being the first to differentiate between localized and general ascitic accumulations in tuberculosis. Donato may have examined a giant human who guarded Francis I.

== Legacy ==
Donatus is remembered as a transitional figure in Renaissance medicine, bridging book-based Galenic tradition with direct observation and autopsy. His work on gastric ulcers is frequently cited in histories of gastroenterology and peptic ulcer disease.

Later physicians and historians, such as those in the 17th–19th centuries, referenced his empirical approach positively. His writings remain of interest to medical historians studying the shift toward modern pathology.

== Death ==
Donatus died on 8 June 1602. A monument was erected in his honor at San Francesco.

== Selected bibliography ==
- De medica historia mirabili libri sex (1586)
- De variolis et morbillis tractatus (on smallpox and measles)
