= John Lykoudis =

Greek physician (1910–1980)

John Lykoudis (Greek: Ιωάννης Λυκούδης; 1910–1980) was a Greek physician and politician. He treated patients who had peptic ulcer disease with antibiotics long before it was commonly recognized that bacteria were a dominant cause for the disease. He became mayor of Missolonghi in 1951, serving until 1959.

== Career ==
After treating himself for peptic ulcer disease with antibiotics in 1958 and finding the treatment effective, Lykoudis began treating patients with antibiotics. After experimenting with several combinations of antibiotics he eventually arrived at a combination which he termed Elgaco and which he patented in 1961. It has been estimated that he treated more than 30,000 patients.

In his time he had great difficulties in persuading the Greek medical establishment about the effectiveness of the treatment. He was given a fine of 4000 drachmas by a disciplinary committee, and indicted in the Greek courts. He was unable to get an article published in the Journal of the American Medical Association and was not able to get the established pharmaceutical companies sufficiently interested in the treatment.

== See also ==
- Timeline of peptic ulcer disease and Helicobacter pylori

== Literature ==
- Basil Rigas; Chris Feretis; Efstathios D Papavassiliou (1 November 1999). "John Lykoudis: an unappreciated discoverer of the cause and treatment of peptic ulcer disease". The Lancet. 354 (9190): 1634–1635. doi:10.1016/S0140-6736(99)06034-1. ISSN 0140-6736. PMID 10560691. Wikidata Q33880179.
- Michael Phillips (1 January 2000). "John Lykoudis and peptic ulcer disease". The Lancet. 355 (9198): 150. doi:10.1016/S0140-6736(05)72070-5. ISSN 0140-6736. PMID 10675202. Wikidata Q50246020.
