= Fiorenzo Tomea =

Italian painter

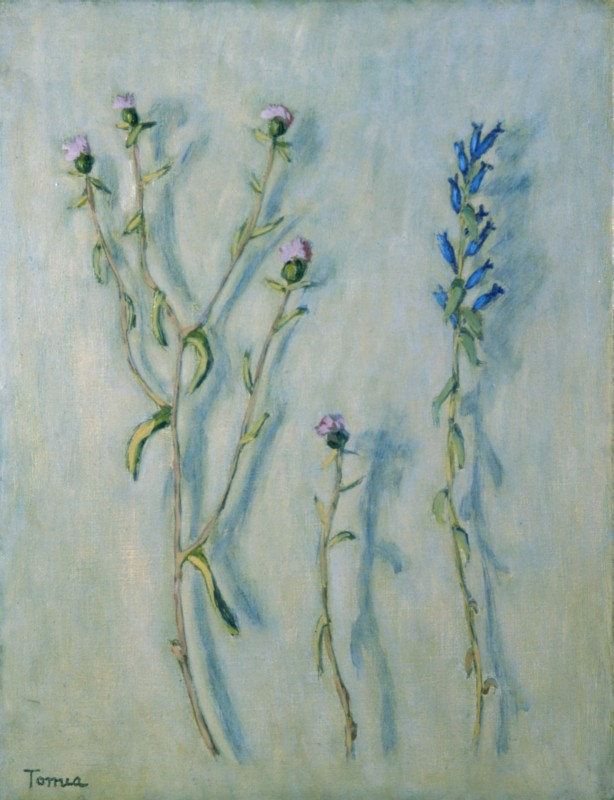
Fiori di campo n. 2, c. 1955 (Fondazione Cariplo)

Fiorenzo Tomea (7 February 1910 – 16 November 1960) was an Italian painter.

== Biography ==
Tomea was born in Zoppè di Cadore, Italy. He studied at the Cignaroli Academy in Verona, where he met Giacomo Manzù and Renato Birolli, in the period 1926–27. Having moved to Milan, he came into contact with Edoardo Persico, who invited him to exhibit his work at the Galleria del Milione in 1931. His focus was primarily on landscape and still life. The second half of the 1930s saw the first marks of official recognition, including a gold medal at the 1st Mostra del Sindacato Interprovinciale Fascista di Belle Arti di Milano in 1937. He joined the Corrente group and presented work with them at the Milan Società per le Belle Arti ed Esposizione Permanente in 1939. The Venice Biennale devoted a room exclusively to Tomea's work at the 23rd Esposizione Internazionale d'Arte della Città di Venezia in 1942. His painting concentrated on landscapes of the Cadore area in the post-war years. He was the runner-up for the Marzotto Prize in 1954 and won the Michetti Prize at Francavilla del Mare in 1958.

== Other projects ==
Media related to Fiorenzo Tomea at Wikimedia Commons
