= Arcumeggia =

Coordinates: 45°55′02″N 8°43′01″E

Arcumeggia (Arcümégia in local dialect) is a fraction of the municipality of Casalzuigno in the province of Varese, in Italy.

== Overview ==
The place is known because in 1956 the Organization Provincial for the Tourism decided to turn it into a painted village. After such decision, came in the country artists as Ferruccio Ferrazzi, Aldo Carpi, Sante Monachesi, Aligi Sassu, Ernesto Treccani, Achille Funi, Giuseppe Migneco, Gianni Dova, Gianfilippo Usellini, Innocente Salvini, Giovanni Brancaccio, Bruno Saetti, Enzo Morelli, Remo Brindisi, Fiorenzo Tomea, Eugenio Tomiolo, Francesco Menzio, Ilario Rossi, Giuseppe Montanari, Cristoforo De Amicis, Luigi Montanarini, Umberto Faini, Antonio Pedretti and Albino Reggiori. The paintings, performed with the technique of the fresco, are on the external walls of the houses of the village:

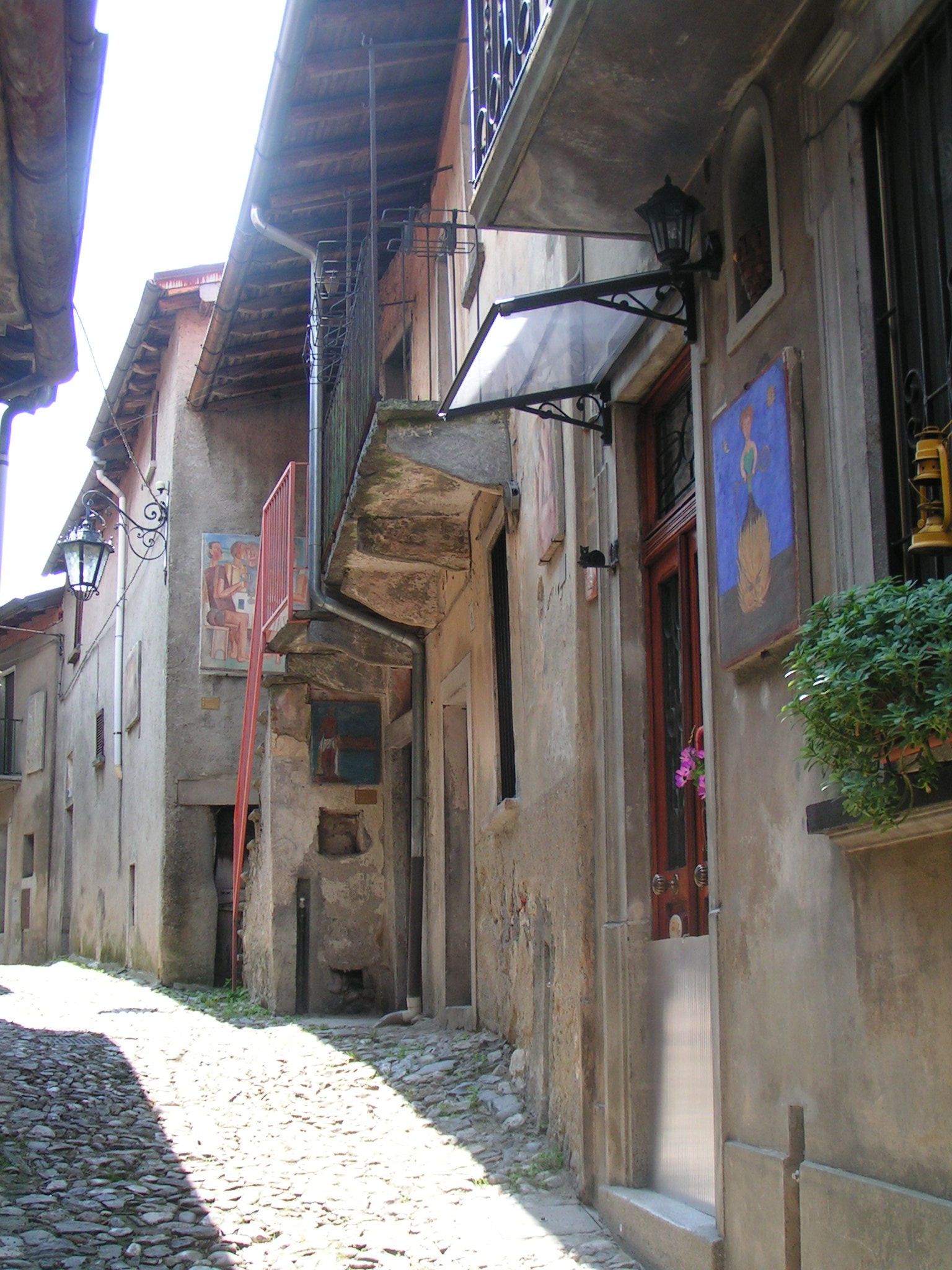
A street of Arcumeggia, said "Students’ street" because there are on show the works of the students of Fine Arts Academies .

- Giovanni Brancaccio: "Girl at the window", 1956
- Remo Brindisi: "Inhabitants and jobs of the place", 1957
- Aldo Carpi: "Sant'Ambrogio blesses Arcumeggia", 1966, "Divine Lamb" (ceramics), 1967
- Cristoforo de Amicis "Madonna and angel", 1958
- Gianni Dova: "The bullfight", 1964
- Umberto Faini: "Allegory of the mural decoration", 1994
- Ferruccio Ferrazzi: "Waiting", 1956
- Achille Funi: "Madonnina", 1956
- Giuseppe Migneco: "The emigrant's departure", 1962
- Francesco Menzio: "Children among the trees", 1956
- Sante Monachesi: "Gea’s triumph", 1959
- Giuseppe Montanari: "St. Martin and the poor man", 1956
- Luigi Montanarini: "Composition", 1959
- Enzo Morelli: "The Samaritane at the well", 1956
- Antonio Pedretti: "In the Alps, heart of Europe, the roots of the European union", 2001
- Bruno Saetti: "Maternity", 1956
- Innocente Salvini: "The division of the polenta in family", 1971
- Aligi Sassu: "Racing cyclists", 1967 and "St. Martin", 1991
- Fiorenzo Tomea: "The Crucified", 1956
- Eugenio Tomiolo: "Hope", 1956
- Ernesto Treccani: "Rural composition", 1974
- Gianfilippo Usellini: "The emigrant's return", 1956, "Sant'Antonio ",1967, "St. Rocco", 1967 and "Severin, drik little wine!!!", 1964.

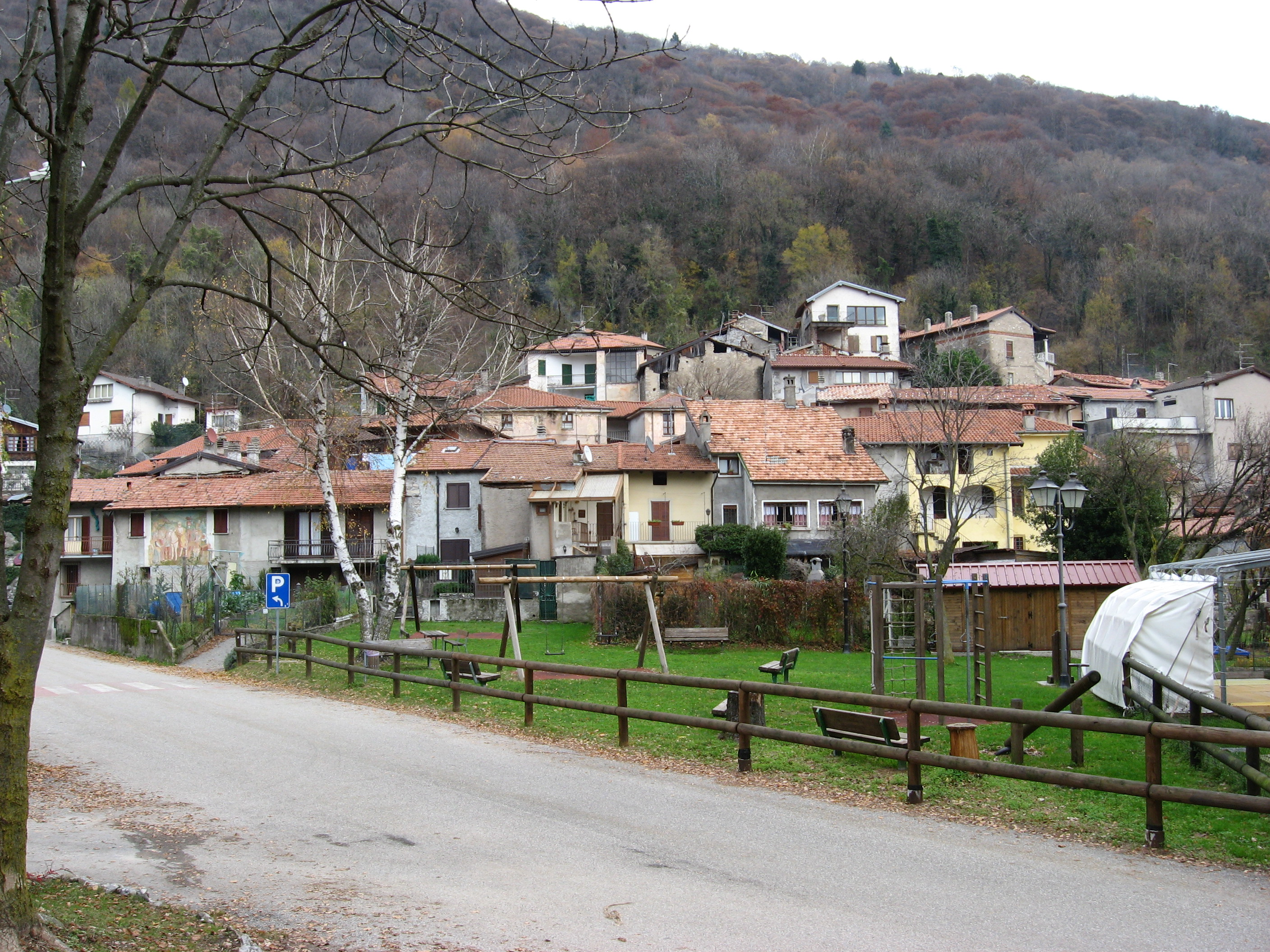
View of Arcumeggia.

Close to the church, there is a Way of the Cross, with the stations painted by 11 different artists:

- I - Giuseppe Montanari: Jesus is condemned to death, 1963
- II - Sante Monachesi: Jesus is given his cross, 1959
- III - Aldo Carpi: Jesus falls the first time, 1963
- IV - Remo Brindisi: Jesus meets Maria, 1960
- V - Enzo Morelli: Jesus helped by Symone of Cirene, 1963
- VI - Ilario Rossi: Veronica wipes the face of Jesus, 1960
- VII - Luigi Montanarini: Jesus falls the second time, 1959
- VIII – Giuseppe Montanari: Jesus meets the pious women, within 1960
- IX - Gianfilippo Usellini: Jesus falls the third time, after April 1960
- X - Giovanni Brancaccio: Jesus stripped of the dresses, 1961
- XI - Aligi Sassu: Jesus is nailed to the cross, 1963 (?)
- XII - Aldo Carpi: Jesus dies on the cross, 1963
- XIII - Gianfilippo Usellini: Jesus' body is removed from the cross, 1963
- XIV - Eugenio Tomiolo: Jesus is laid in the sepulchre, 1965

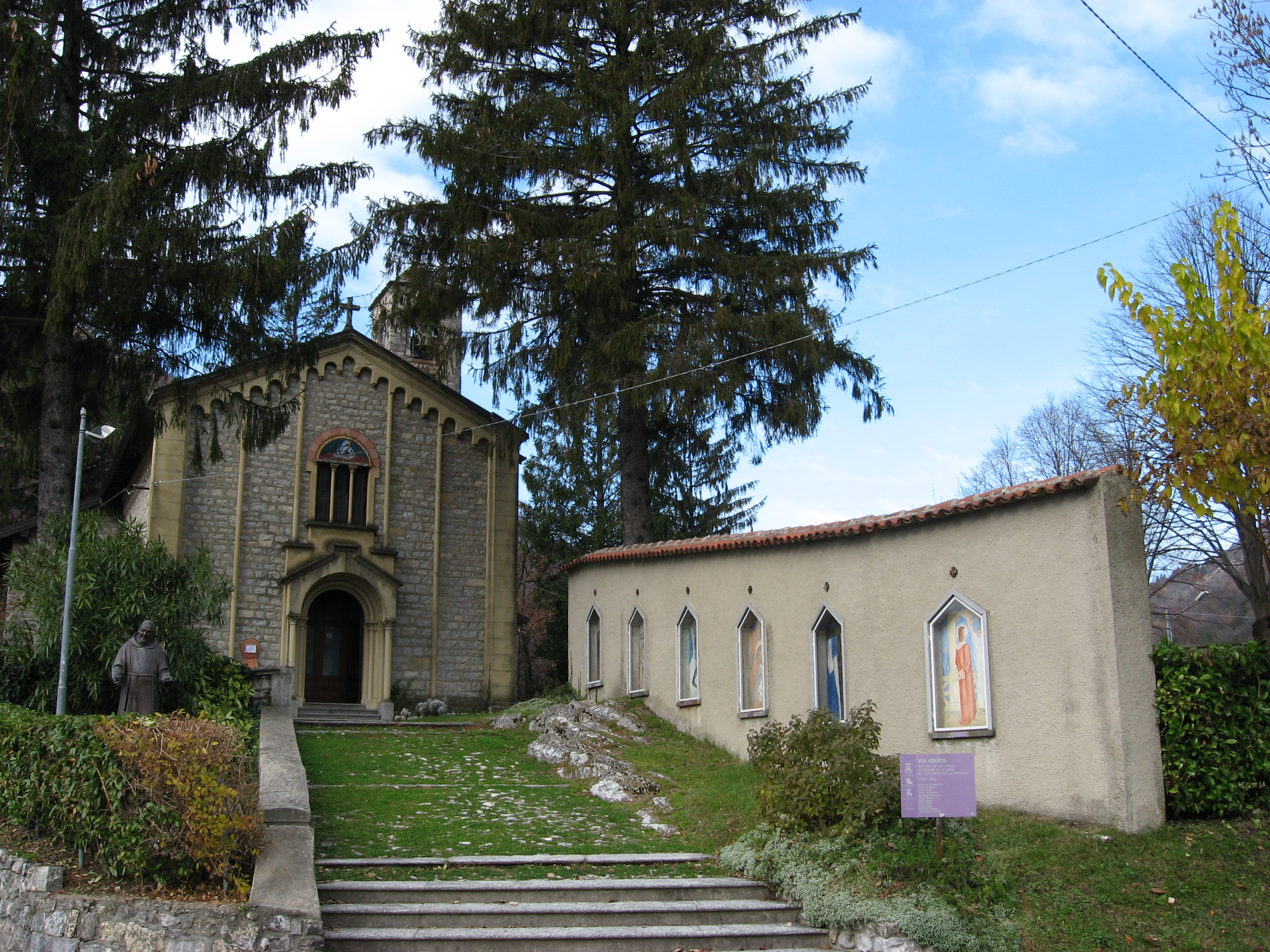
The Church with a Way of the Cross paint by 11 artists.

Notable it is also the House of the Painter that preserves the sketches and the tests of the frescos and hosts summer courses of painting organized by the Academy of Fine Arts of Brera.

Arcumeggia is the native country of the sculptor Giuseppe Vittorio Cerini (1862–1935), of which numerous works are in Italy (Turin, Bra, Ceva, St. Benign Canavese, Virle and in the Varesotto) and in some foreign countries (Switzerland and Argentina). May be admired a small gallery of plaster casts in the courtyard of the native house and two marble works in the local cemetery.

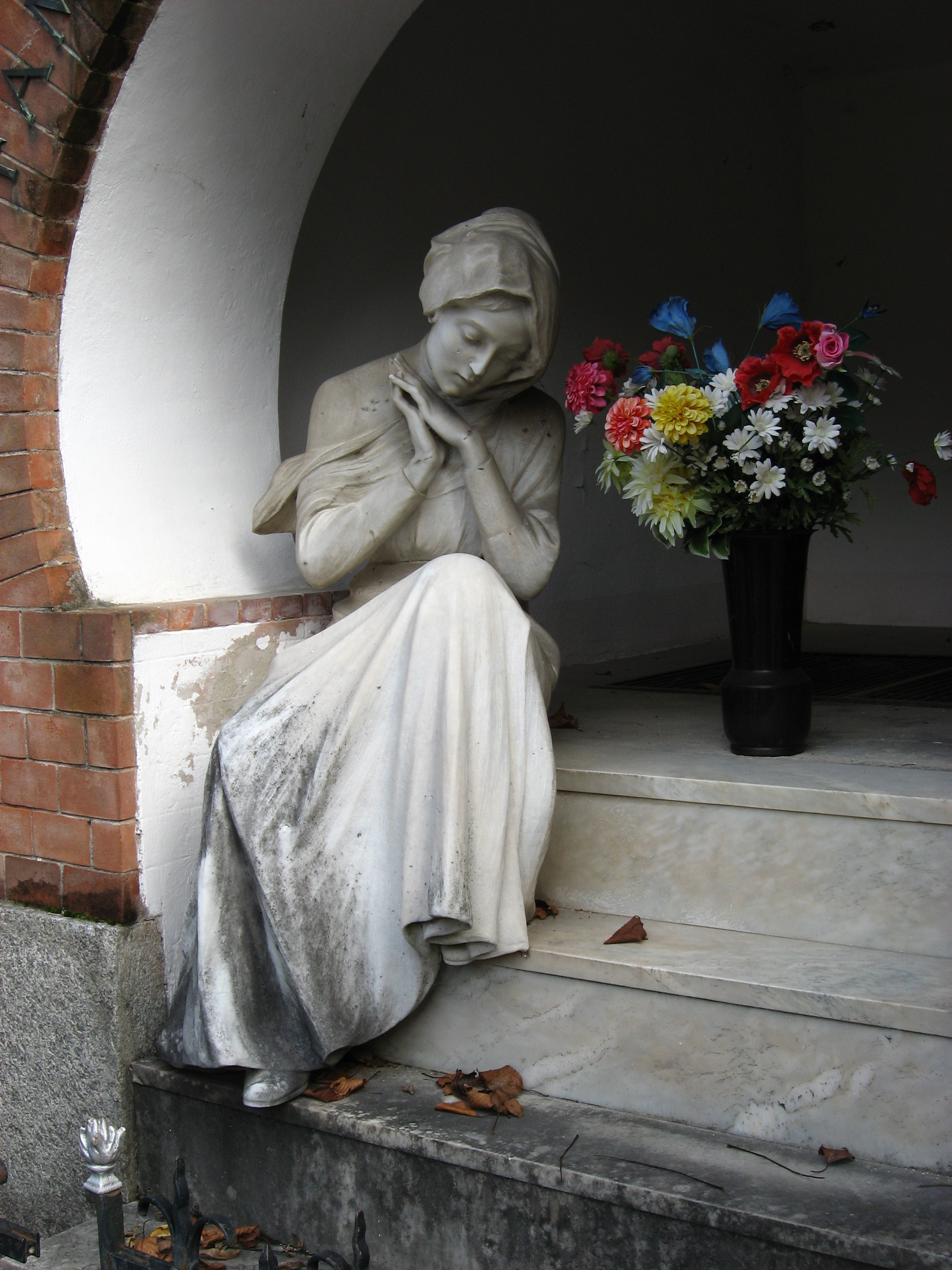
Giuseppe Vittorio Cerini’s sculpture (1862-1935)

== Bibliography ==
- Arcumeggia, la galleria all'aperto dell'affresco. Edizione "Pro Arcumeggia" presso l'Ente Provinciale Turismo - Varese, 1985
- Giuseppe Cerini di Arcumeggia - Lavoro di ricerca della libera associazione culturale "La corte dei Sofistici", 1999
- Carlo Torriani: "Sui muri di Arcumeggia nuovo splendore per gli affreschi di Funi, Brindisi, Dova" - Corriere della sera del 27-7-1984
- Aristide Selmi: "Se dovete andare in piazza Dova prendete via Tomea e poi via Sassu" - Domenica del Corriere dell'11-9-1975
- Angelo Montonati: "Arcumeggia, il paese grandi firme" - Famiglia Cristiana n. 38, 1995
- Meridiani - Laghi lombardi - Anno XVII n. 127
- Arcumeggia - La galleria all'aperto dell'affresco a cura di Alberto Bertoni e Raffaella Ganna, Macchione Editore, 1997
