= Beniamino Joppolo =

Italian writer, painter and playwright (1906-1963)

- Born: 31 July 1906; Patti, Messina, Italy
- Died: 2 October 1963 (aged 57); Paris, France
- Occupation: Writer

Beniamino Joppolo (31 July 1906 – 2 October 1963) was an Italian writer, painter and playwright.

== Life and career ==
Born in Patti, Sicily, the son of a liceo classico literature professor, Joppolo studied political and social sciences at the University of Florence, graduating in 1929. In spite of having been a member of the National Fascist Party and of the Blackshirts until 1926, Joppolo shortly later became a critic of the regime, being arrested for criticising the regime and deported from Ravenna to Sicily in 1936, and again arrested as an anti-fascist and sentenced to confinement in Forenza in 1937.

Joppolo made his literary debut in 1929, with the poetry collection I canti dei sensi e dell'idea. Starting from 1941, he authored numerous plays, which featured "existential crisis usually set in a surreal dimension, in which, however, there was no lack of denunciation of a society that deprived the individual of freedom". His best known work is the drama play I carabinieri, which was staged several times including in an adaptation directed by Roberto Rossellini, and in 1963 was adapted in the Jean-Luc Godard's film The Carabineers. He also wrote novels and was an art and film critic for publications such as Corrente, L'Ora, Il Gazzettino, Filmcritica.

In 1942, Joppolo married painter Carla Rossi, and starting from 1947 he began painting he himself, holding his first solo exhibition in 1949. A member of Spatialism, he authored the first official manifesto of the movement in 1948, as well as several other theoretical writings and manifestos. He left spatialism in the 1960s, moving towards abstract expressionism.

Settled with his family in Paris since 1954, he died there in 1963.
