= Giulio Bizzozero =

Italian physician

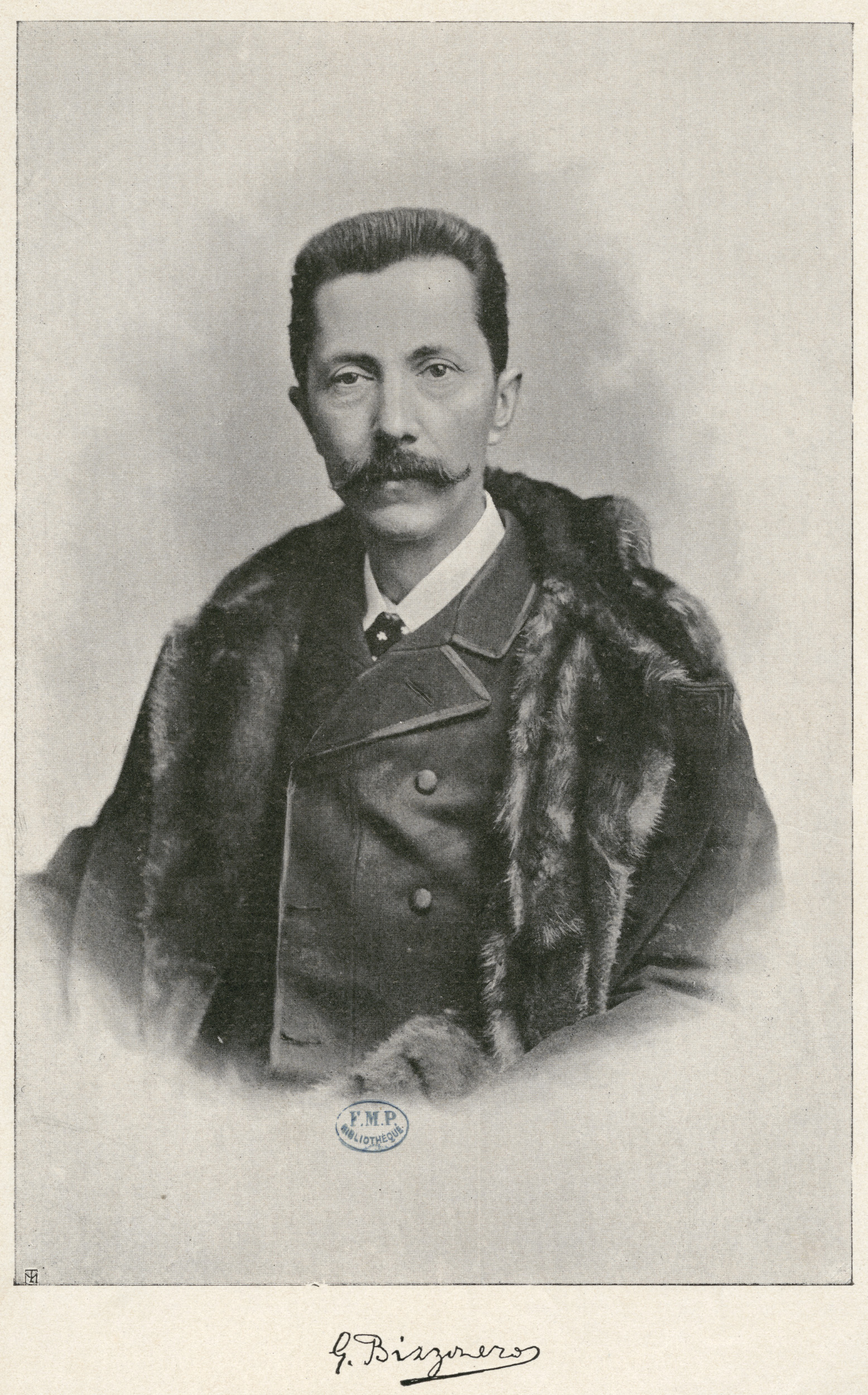
- Born: 20 March 1846; Varese, Lombardy-Venetia
- Died: 8 April 1901 (aged 55)
- Citizenship: Italian
- Education: University of Pavia, University of Milan,
- Known for: Helicobacter pylori, histography, platelet

Signature
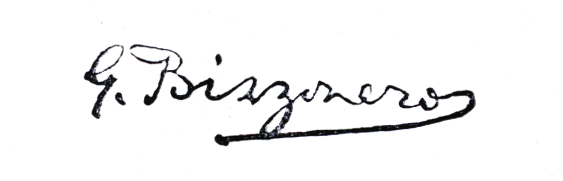

Giulio Bizzozero (Italian pronunciation: [ˈdʒuːljo bidˈdzɔddzero]; 20 March 1846 – 8 April 1901) was an Italian doctor and medical researcher. He was a pioneer of histology and is credited with the coining of the term platelets and identifying their function in coagulation.

== Background ==
Bizzozero was born in Varese, Lombardy, at the time part of the Austrian Empire, to Felice and Carolina Veratti. The family were involved in the Risorgimento, an older brother Cesare fought against Austria while Carolina served as a volunteer nurse. After high school, he studied medicine at the University of Pavia, where he performed histological and histopathological research under the guidance of Paolo Mantegazza (1831-1910) and the microscopist Eusebio Oehl. In 1866 he graduated from Pavia at the age of 20. He then travelled and worked with Rudolf Virchow in Berlin and Heinrich Frey in Zurich. In 1867, he was chosen as the chief of general pathology and histology at the University of Pavia. This institute trained many important Italian researchers, such as Camillo Golgi (1843–1926).

In 1872, at the age of 26, he moved to the University of Turin, and founded the Institute of General Pathology. While at Turin he worked to improve hygiene and water supply. Among the physicians who worked and studied in his laboratory at Turin were Edoardo Bassini (1844-1924) and Carlo Forlanini (1847-1918).

In April 1901, he died of pneumonia. For his scientific achievements, Bizzozero was named by king Humbert I, a life senator in 1890.

== Achievements ==
Bizzozero was one of the pioneers of histology, and, more generally, the use of the microscope in medical research. He is known for his early description of Helicobacter pylori (1892), the bacteria that is responsible for peptic ulcer disease (although this fact was not generally accepted until the 1990s).

In 1869 he noted the value of blood transfusions in treating anemia. In 1881 he described platelets as a third element in blood after the erythrocytes and leucocytes. Platelets had been described by Max Schultze in 1865 but Bizzozero identified their function. He called them piastrine (Italian), plaquettes (French) and Blutplattchenin (German). He demonstrated their role in clotting through aggregation and clumping with the formation of thread like structures now known as fibrin.

Other significant work by Bizzozero included research of haematopoiesis in the bone marrow, studies involving phagocytosis in the eye, and the identification of desmosomes (nodes of Bizzozero), structures that he first discovered in the stratum spinosum of epidermis.

== See also ==
- Timeline of peptic ulcer disease and Helicobacter pylori
- Pathology
- List of pathologists

== Sources ==
- Figura, Natale; Laura Bianciardi (2002). "Helicobacters were discovered in Italy in 1892: An episode in the scientific life of an eclectic pathologist, Giulio Bizzozero". In Barry Marshall (ed.). Helicobacter Pioneers: Firsthand Accounts from the Scientists Who Discovered Helicobacters. Victoria, Australia: Blackwell Science Asia. pp. 1–13. ISBN 0-86793-035-7.
- Vigliani, R. (August 2002). "Giulio Bizzozero: Remenbrance 100 years after his death". Pathologica. 94 (4): 206–215. doi:10.1007/s102420200033. PMID 12325420.
- Brewer, DB (2006). "Max Schultze (1865), G. Bizzozero (1882) and the discovery of the platelet". Br J Haematol. 133 (3): 251–8. doi:10.1111/j.1365-2141.2006.06036.x. PMID 16643426. S2CID 19334121.
