= Camillo Bozzolo =

Italian physician

Camillo Bozzolo (May 30, 1845 – February 28, 1920) was an Italian physician who was a native of Milan.

In 1868 he received his medical doctorate from the University of Pavia, and afterwards continued his studies in Austria and Germany at the laboratories of Johann von Oppolzer (1808–1871), Ludwig Traube (1818–1876) and Rudolf Virchow (1821–1902). Later he was an assistant pathologist to Giulio Bizzozero (1846–1901) in Turin, and in 1883 a professor and director of the medical clinic in Turin.

His earlier studies dealt with metastasis of cancer involving the bloodstream and lymph glands. With Edoardo Perroncito (1847–1936) and Luigi Pagliani (1847–1931), he discovered that hookworm (Ancylostoma duodenale) was the cause of anemia affecting workmen building the St. Gotthard Railway. He is credited for introducing thymol as a treatment for hookworm.

== Associated eponyms ==
- "Kahler-Bozzolo disease": (also "Kahler's disease") a fatal condition with occurrence of multiple myeloma in the bone marrow. Named with Otto Kahler (1849–1893).
- "Bozzolo's sign": Pulsating vessels in the nasal mucous membrane, seen sometimes in aneurysm of the thoracic aorta.
