= Raffaele De Grada =

Italian painter (1885–1957)

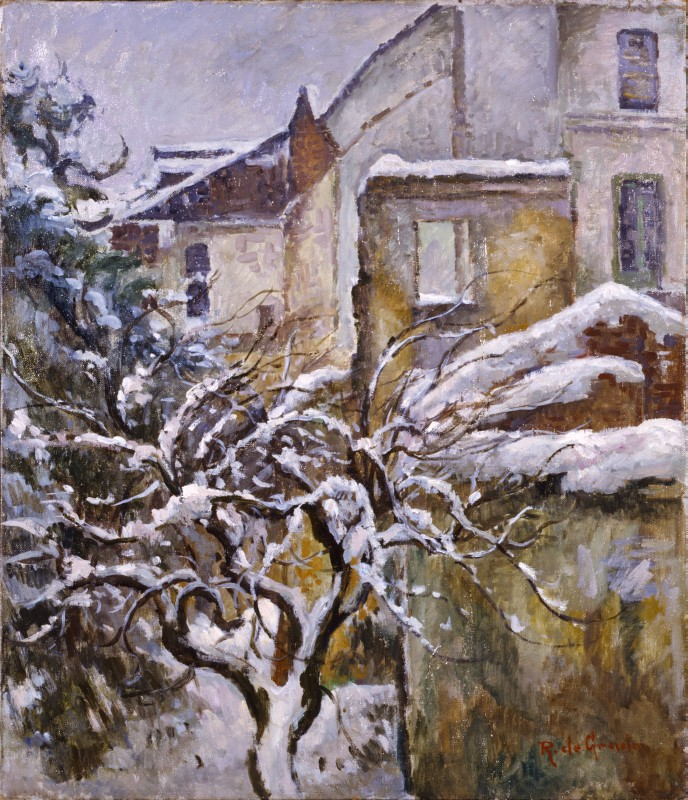
Neve o Nevicata, c. 1950 (Fondazione Cariplo)

Raffaele De Grada (2 March 1885 – 10 April 1957) was an Italian painter.

== Biography ==
De Grada was born in Milan, Italy. Initially trained by his father, a decorator, in Argentina and then from 1899 in Zürich, he attended the academies of Dresden and Karlsruhe over the period 1902–1905. Influenced by the Swiss Secession movement, he enjoyed success as a landscape painter from 1913 on. He moved to San Gimignano after World War I and then to Florence, where he lived until 1929. He joined the Novecento Italiano movement and took part in their two exhibitions in Milan (1926 and 1929) as well as their group shows in other Italian and European cities. His participation in the Venice Biennale began by invitation with the 13th Esposizione Internazionale d'Arte di Venezia in 1922. Having moved to Milan in 1930, he obtained a professorship at the Monza School of Art in 1931. Particularly known for his views of the Tuscan countryside, De Grada welcomed different generations of artists into his home, including members of the Corrente movement, with whom he also exhibited works at the group show held by the Società per le Belle Arti ed Esposizione Permanente in 1939. He took part in numerous exhibitions after World War II.

== Other projects ==
Media related to Raffaele De Grada (painter) at Wikimedia Commons
